= Hinshaw's =

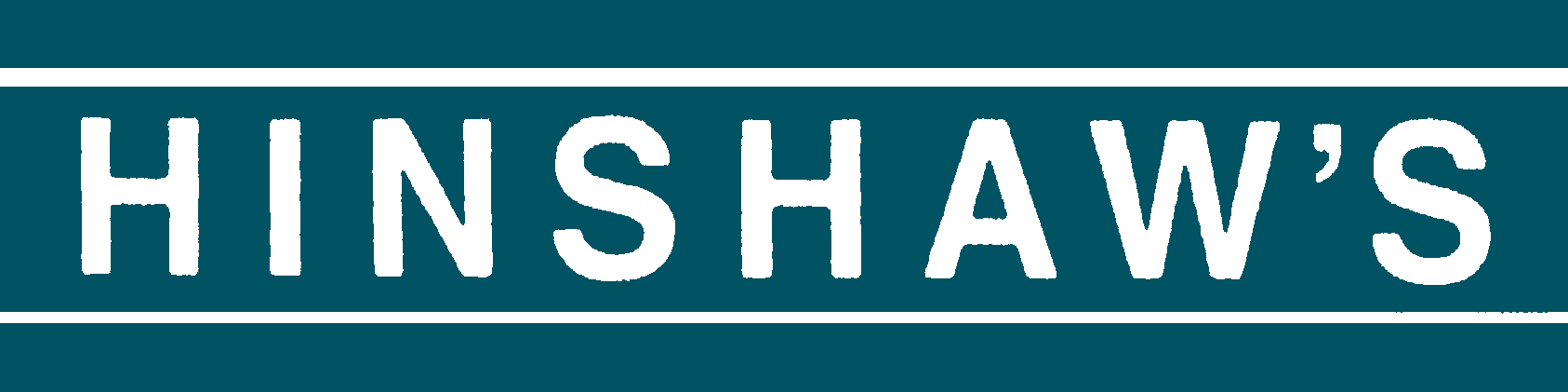
Hinshaw's logo

Hinshaw's was an American two-location department store chain in Southern California that was in business between 1951 and 1992.

== Founder ==
Hinshaw's was founded by Ezra Bushong Hinshaw, who was born April 4, 1899, in Windsor, North Carolina, and raised in Boise, Idaho. He was raised in the Quaker faith. Prior to opening his own store he had been a manager of a Montgomery Ward store and, after relocating to California, became the president of the C.C. Anderson Department Store, a local company in Whittier.

== Locations ==
The first Hinshaw's location was on the southwest corner of Baldwin Avenue and Duarte in the Arcadia Hub shopping area of Arcadia, California. This store opened in 1951, and ultimately grew to contain 125,000 square feet (11,600 m^{2}) of retail space. It was the main anchor of the Baldwin Avenue shopping strip, and the only large department store in Arcadia until a branch of May Company opened several years later.

In the mid-1950s, Hinshaw's opened a second branch, in the new Whittier Quad Shopping Center in Whittier. Hinshaw's was one of two anchor stores in the quad, its complement being another branch of The May Company. The Whittier branch of Hinshaw's also had 125,000 square feet (11,600 m^{2}) of space. Both branches had multi-level parking garages despite their suburban locations.

The Whittier Quad shopping center was heavily damaged in the Whittier Narrows earthquake of 1987. Hinshaw's building suffered the least damage, and remained open as the center's only tenant for several years. Sales were poor, and remained depressed after the remainder of the Quad was rebuilt. The company announced the store's closure in December 1991. The Arcadia store was closed in 1992. The company had been at that time the last surviving independent department store chain in Los Angeles County.

Hinshaw's Arcadia location prospered for a while, but ultimately closed due to competition from the nearby Westfield Santa Anita shopping center, which underwent a major expansion in the 1990s. The closed store was replaced by a Burlington Coat Factory store, which opened in 1998–1999. That location closed down in 2023.
