= Hoover Hotel =

Historic hotel in Whittier, California, US

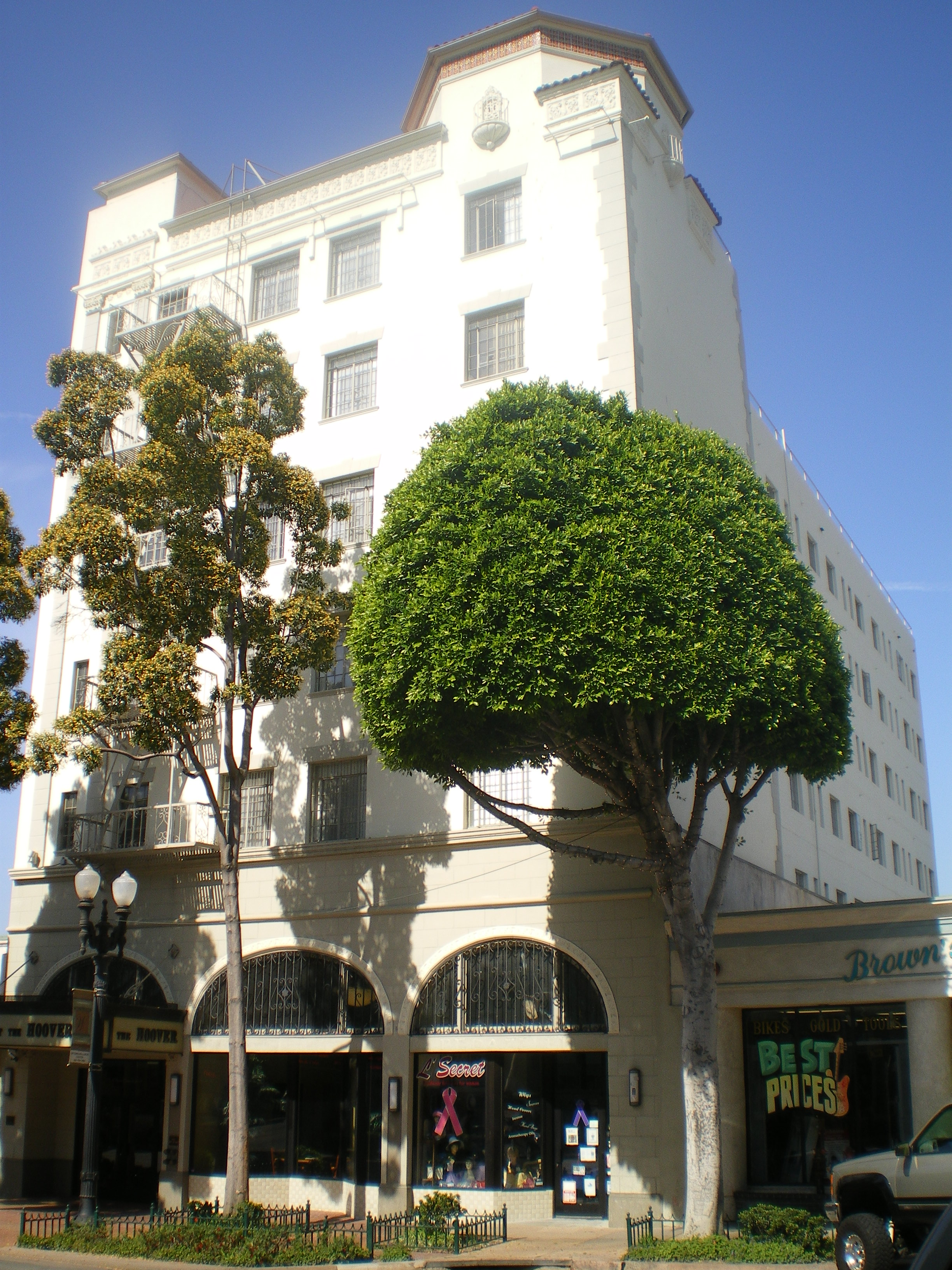

- Location within the Los Angeles metropolitan area Location within California Location within the United States

General information
- Architectural style: Mediterranean Revival-Spanish Colonial Revival
- Location: 7035 Greenleaf Ave, Whittier, California, United States
- Completed: 1930

Design and construction
- Architects: Bushnell, David
- Hoover Hotel
- U.S. National Register of Historic Places
- Coordinates: 33°58′41″N 118°2′10″W
- NRHP reference No.: 02000074
- Added to NRHP: February 1, 2002

Hoover Hotel is a historic hotel in Whittier, Los Angeles County, Southern California.

== History ==
The hotel was built in 1930, in the Mediterranean Revival and Spanish Colonial Revival architectural styles. It was listed in the National Register of Historic Places in 2002.

When the Hoover Hotel opened in 1930, the Hoover's 100 guest rooms and elegant ballrooms were the most prestigious place for out-of-town visitors to stay in the Whittier area and for locals to conduct receptions and other events. The area around the Hoover declined after World War II, and the Hoover became a single-room occupancy hotel that attracted indigents. Its ballroom became a bar and pool hall.

=== Seasons at the Hoover ===
In 2001, the property was redeveloped by LINC Housing and Vista Communities as Seasons at the Hoover, an affordable housing project with 50 units for low-income senior citizens. The total cost of the redevelopment project was $7.7 million.

The project has been recognized by the Whittier Historic Resources Commission, the Whittier Conservancy, and the Building Industry Association, which selected it as the best senior housing of 2001. The National Association of Home Builders awarded the project the Gold Medal Best of Seniors Housing in February 2002 and also presented it the Jurors' Award for Innovation.
