= The Quad at Whittier =

Shopping mall in Whittier, California

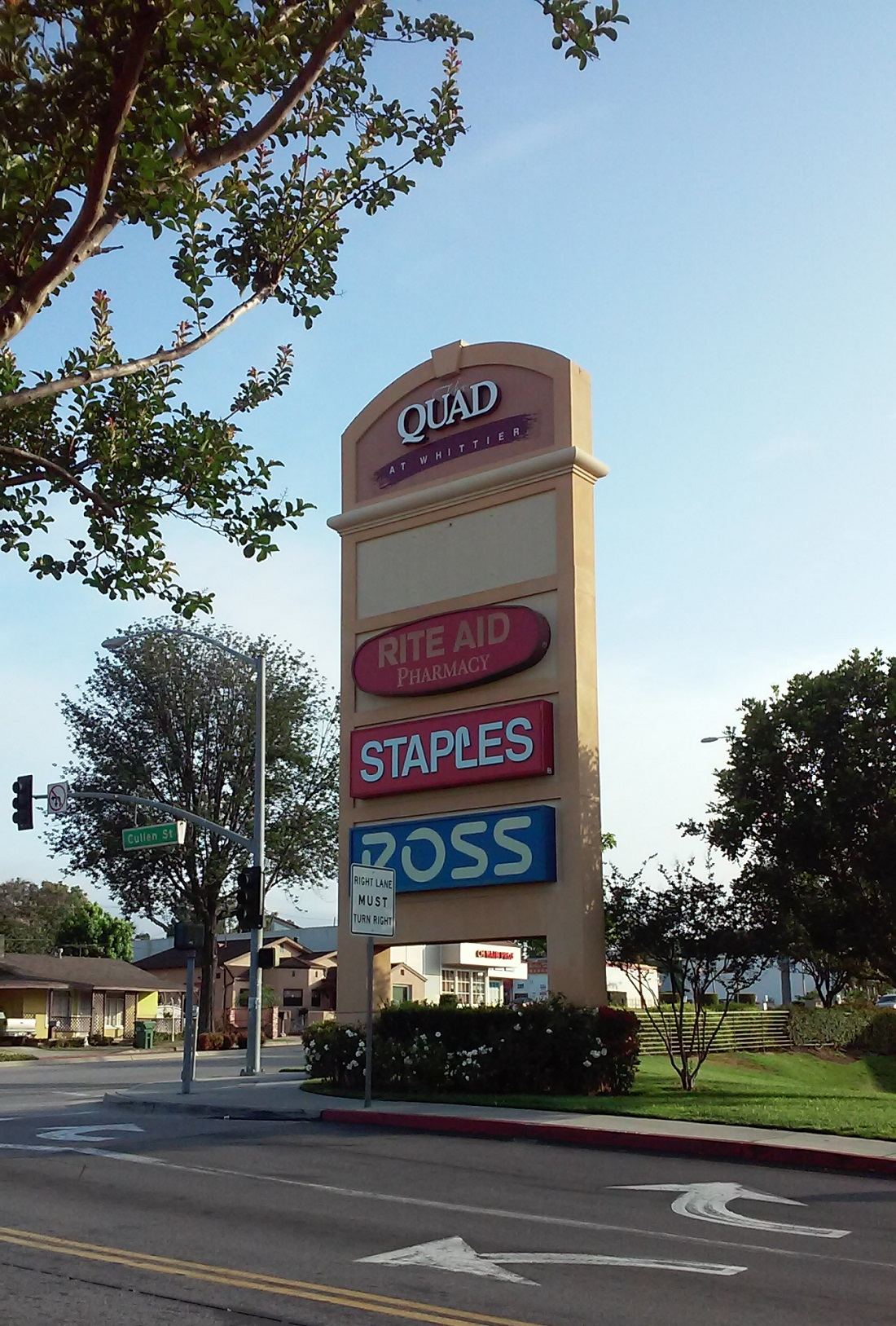
- Side Entrance of the Quad
- Location: Whittier, California, USA
- Coordinates: 33°57′39″N 118°1′56″W
- Address: Cnr SEC Whittier Blvd. & Painter Avenue
- Opened: 1953
- Owner: Terramar Retail Centers
- Num. of anchor tenants: 7
- Floor area: 432,596 sq ft
- Website: The Quad at Whittier

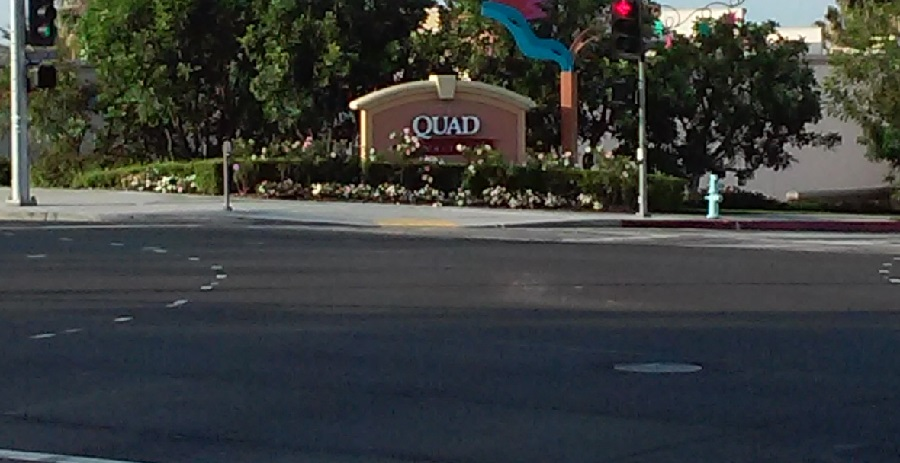
The front corner of the Quad in Whittier, CA

The Quad at Whittier is a shopping mall in Whittier, California.

== History ==
It was built in 1953 and expanded in 1965 with the addition of a 3-story, 248,000-square-foot May Company California department store. Arcadia-based Hinshaw's and Pasadena-based Nash's were other major tenants.

The center began to seriously struggle in 1986 after May Company closed, though it had not been a solid performer beforehand. Without May, merchants struggled due to poor visibility as commercial centers on Whittier Boulevard siphoned off traffic. A minor renovation including new landscaping and the demolition of a small portion of the center had begun by March 1987. The 1987 Whittier Narrows earthquake collapsed the parking garage in front of the May building, leading to its demolition. At the urging of the city of Whittier, which was anxious to replace lost tax revenue, Schurgin Corporation acquired the Quad property in 1988 from Golden West Properties; Schurgin planned to demolish the entire center except for Hinshaw's, which would reduce its footprint. Hinshaw's, the only store not affected by the earthquake, closed in 1992.
