= Paradox Hybrid Walnut Tree =

California Historic Landmark

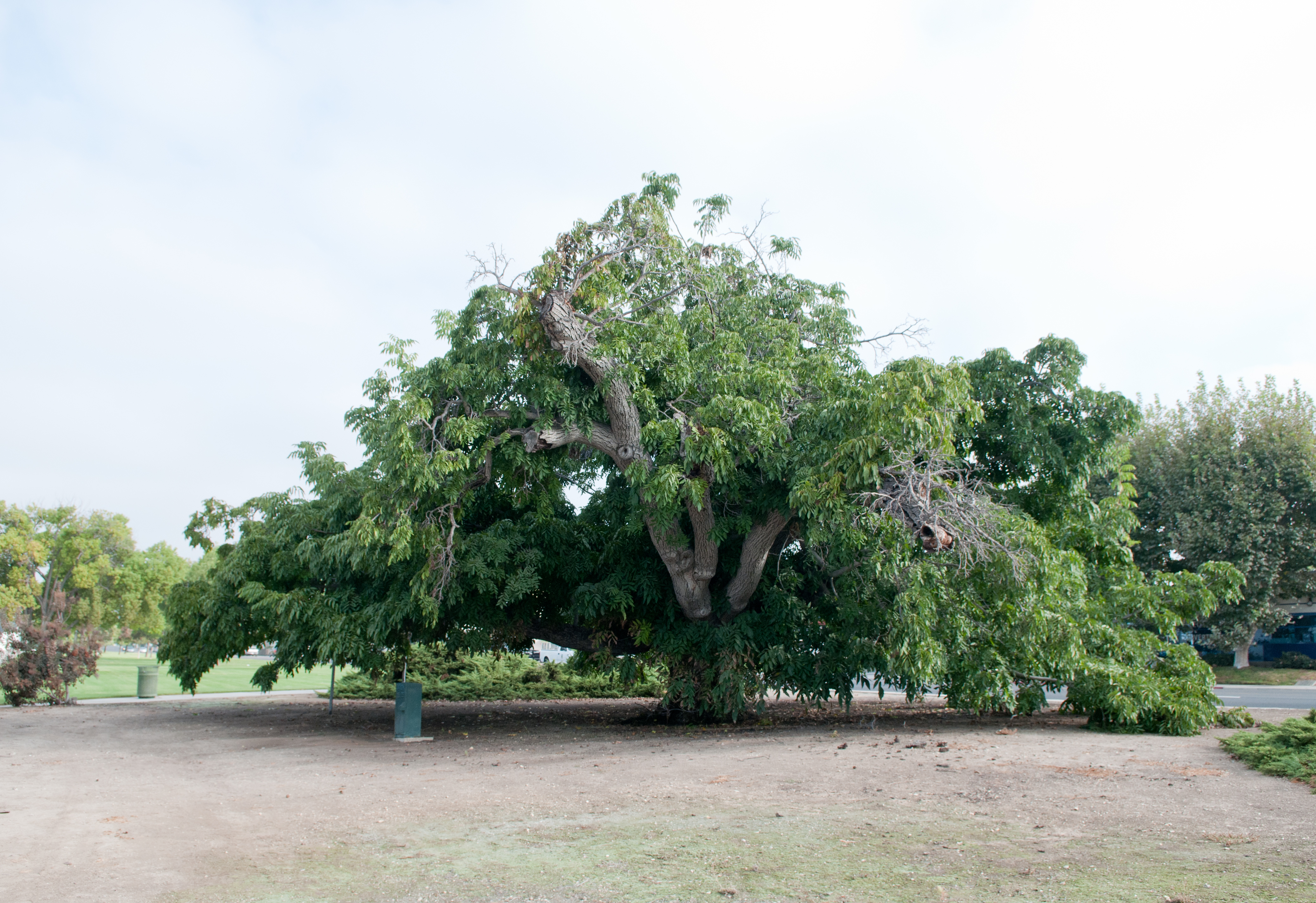
- Paradox Hybrid Walnut Tree in Whittier

- Location within the Los Angeles metropolitan area
- 33°58′26″N 118°02′46″W
- Location: Whittier, California

History
- Built: 1907

California Historical Landmark
- Designated: May 29, 1959
- Reference no.: 681

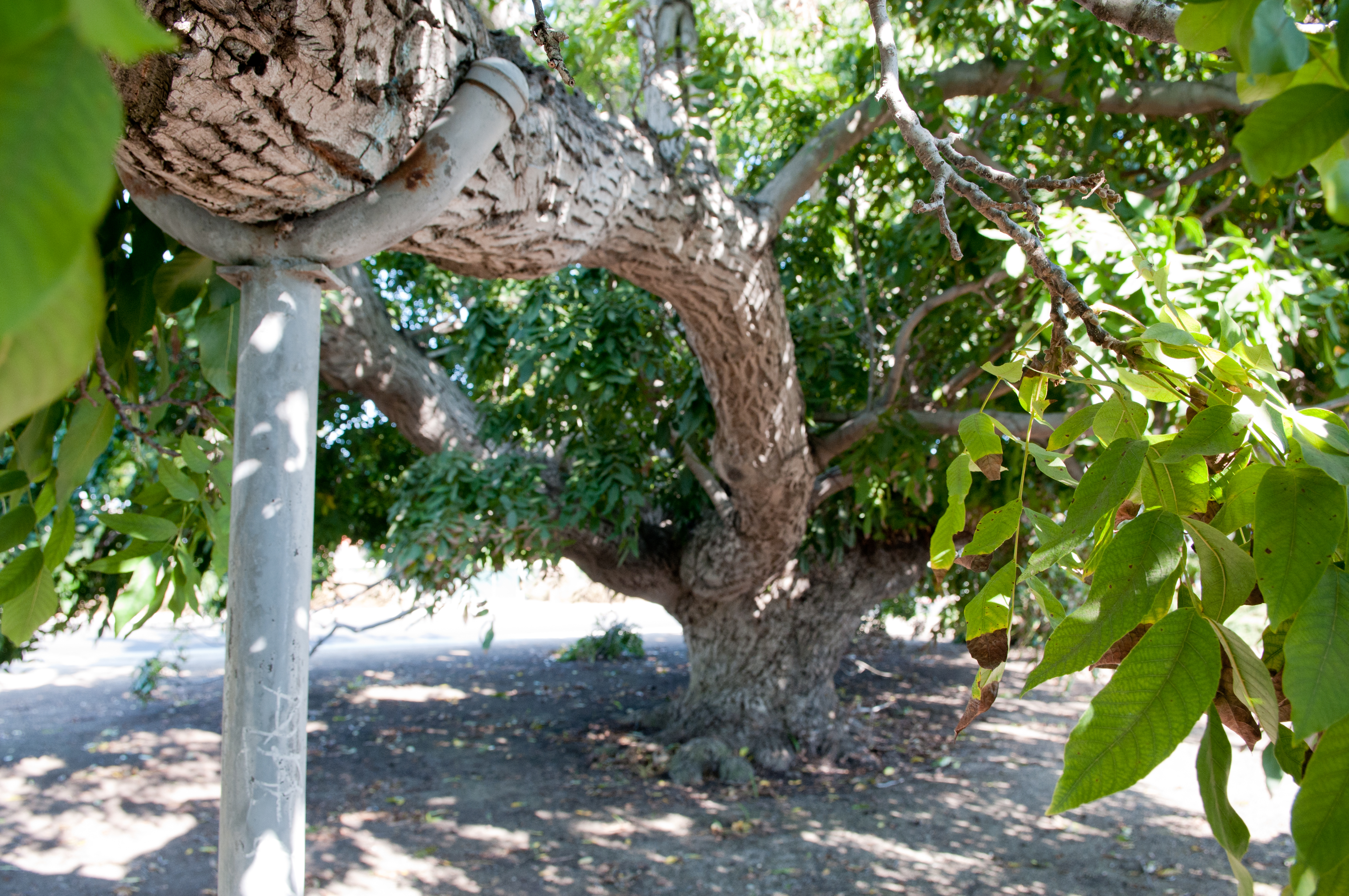
Paradox Hybrid Walnut Tree

The Paradox Hybrid Walnut Tree was planted by George Weinshank in 1907. The Paradox Hybrid Walnut Tree was designated a California Historic Landmark (No.681) on May 29, 1959. The Paradox Hybrid Walnut Tree is located is in what is now the City of Whittier, California in Los Angeles County at 12300 Whittier Blvd, Whittier, Cal. George Weinshank worked with Professor Ralph Smith with the University of California in the development of walnut trees for growing in California. The experimental Walnut Tree is still growing and the walnut industry in California has done well. About 99% of all the United States walnuts are grown in California. Walnuts grown in California account for two-thirds of the world's walnut trade.

== Marker ==
Marker on the site reads:

- "NO. 681 PARADOX HYBRID WALNUT TREE – Planted in 1907 by George Weinshank and assistants under the direction of Professor Ralph Smith as part of an experimental planting for the University of California Experiment Station, this tree stands as a monument to the early cooperation of state educational system with local walnut industry."

== See also ==
- California Historical Landmarks in Los Angeles County
