= National Bank of Whittier Building =

Historic building in Whittier, California, USA

- U.S. National Register of Historic Places
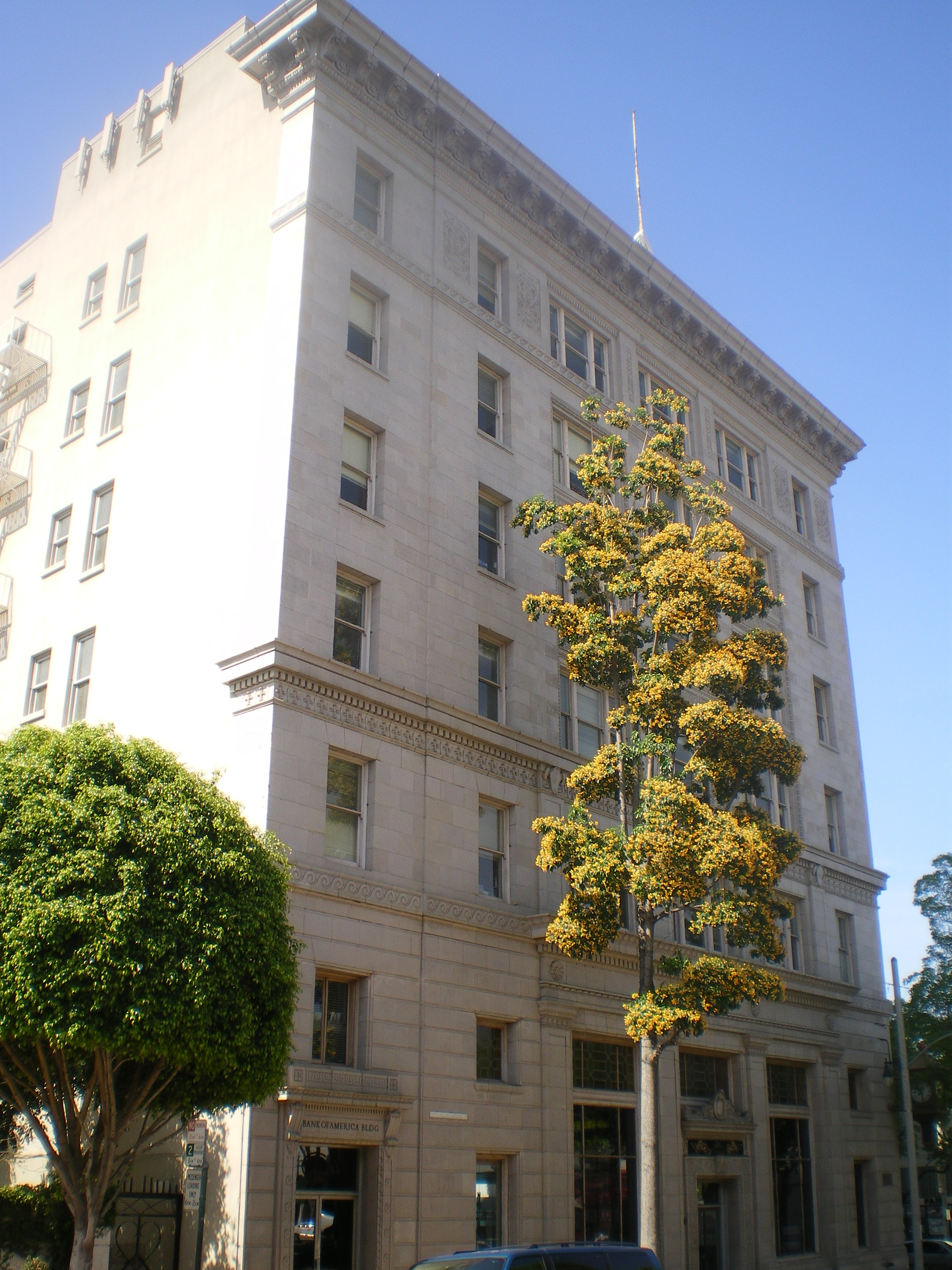
- National Bank of Whittier Building, 2008

- Location within the Los Angeles metropolitan area Location within California Location within the United States
- Location: 13006 Philadelphia Street; Whittier, California
- Coordinates: 33°58′44″N 118°2′10″W
- Built: 1923
- Architect: John and David Parkinson
- Architectural style: Beaux Arts
- Website: www.poetgardens.com
- NRHP reference No.: 82000969
- Added to NRHP: December 30, 1982

National Bank of Whittier Building is a historic commercial building in uptown Whittier, California. Built in 1923 by John and David Parkinson in the Beaux Arts Neoclassical architecture style, the building was added to the National Register of Historic Places in 1982.

The current building is the best remaining example of the Beaux Arts style in the City. The building is of national significance as it was the site of Richard M. Nixon's first law office. Whittier was Nixon's boyhood home from the age of nine. In 1938, he served as the Deputy City Attorney to the City of Whittier. A replica of President Nixon's office has been re-created and is available to tour at the Whittier Historical Museum.

The bank located in this building was operated by the Perry family of bankers. Herman Perry served on the school board and was a member of the Committee of 100 that bankrolled Nixon's first run for Congress. His son Hubert overlapped with Nixon at Whittier High School and became a noted Whittier philanthropist.

The building now bears the name Nixon Plaza in honor of its most famous tenant.

== Poet Gardens ==
Poet Gardens is a food hall located on the ground floor of the historic Nixon Plaza in Uptown Whittier.

Poet Gardens opened in the fall of 2019, becoming the first food hall to open in the city. The market has a square footage of over 15,000 square feet (1,400 m^{2}), and is anchored by the Whittier Brewing Company and houses 7 food stalls. The food hall was conceptualized by Ricardo Diaz, a local restaurateur and chef.
