= Nash's =

Historical department store chain in California

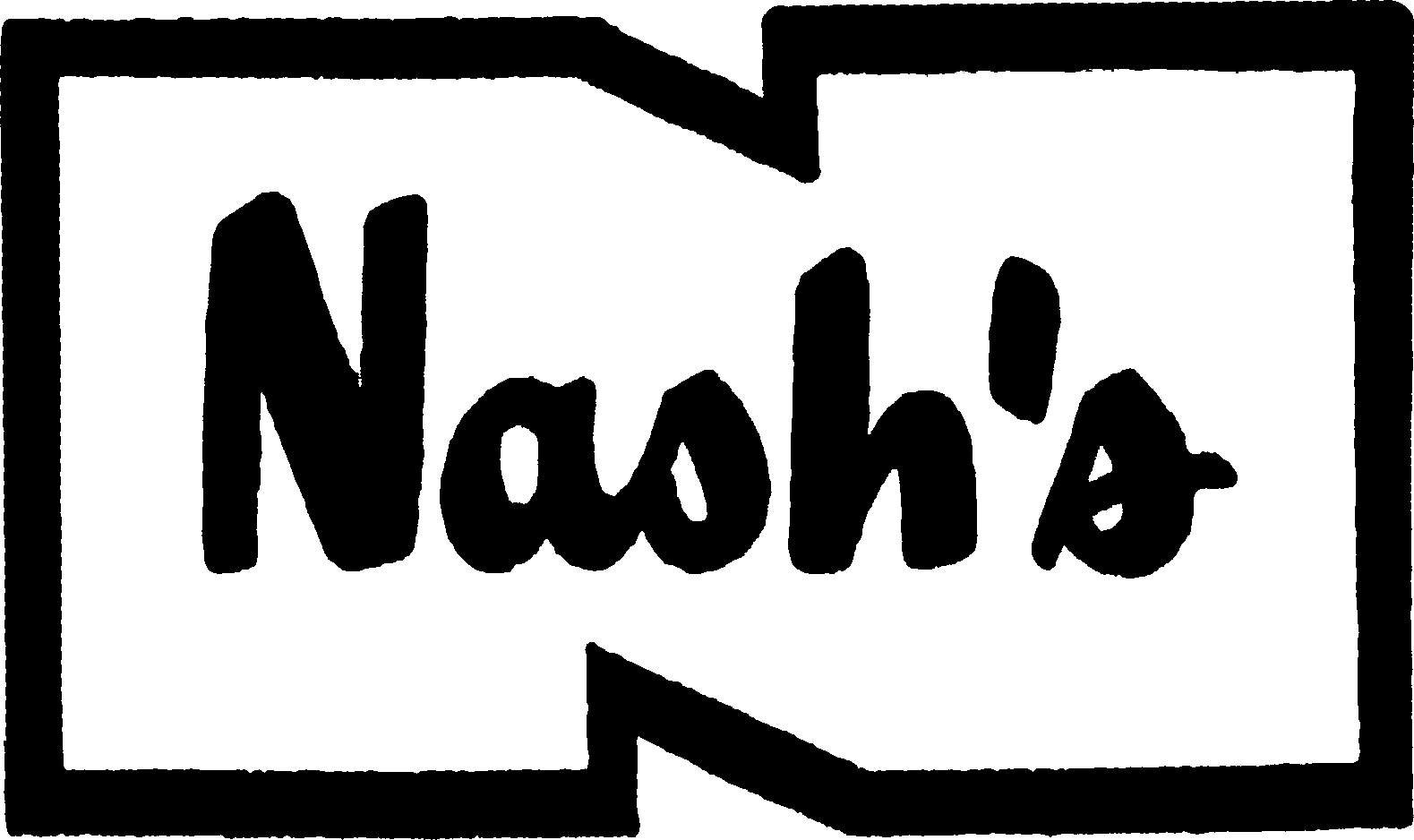
Nash's logo

Nash's (F. C. Nash & Co.) was a Pasadena, California-based department store which grew into a small chain. Nash's was founded in 1889 by Hammond G. Nash, who developed his grocery on Colorado Street into a full department store. He continued to open locations in nearby towns:

- Alhambra, downtown at 36 West Main Street
- Pomona at Indian Hill Mall, later 450 Pomona Mall, the town's downtown pedestrian mall
- West Arcadia at the Arcadia Hub shopping center (1325 South Baldwin Avenue), current site of L. A. Fitness
- Whittier at Whittier Quad, 30,000 square feet (2,800 m^{2}), opened 1954
- Fullerton at intersection of Harbor Boulevard and Orangethorpe Avenue

The Pasadena flagship was located downtown 250 East Colorado Boulevard, but burned in a 1976 fire and was a total loss. The chain was unable to recover from the associated financial losses and closed entirely.
