= Pomona Mall =

Former mall in Pomona, California

Pomona Mall was a pedestrian mall in downtown Pomona, California, recognized by the Los Angeles Conservancy as an outstanding example of Mid-century modern and modern architecture and design. It was completed in 1962 and designed by Millard Sheets. It had been in the planning for five years, one element in a larger plan of civic improvements covering the whole city.

Pomona Mall took nine blocks of the existing downtown shopping district, pedestrianized it and added trees, benches, artwork, fountains and adjacent parking.

Much of the art is still in place, mosaics and sculptures by Millard Sheets himself, Arthur and Jean Ames, Betty Davenport Ford, and John Svenson.

Sheets asked his friend and patron Howard Ahmanson to locate a new Home Savings and Loan branch on the mall, also designed by Sheets with a notable tower.

Anchor stores on the mall included a new Buffums department store (1962), JCPenney, Woolworth's, S. H. Kress and Pasadena-based Nash's Department Store.

Initially a success, only seven years later in 1969 newspapers described a high level of vacancies. In 1977, five of the nine blocks were given back to automobile traffic. The eastern end is now part of the Western University of Health Sciences campus. The western end now houses numerous art galleries, art studios and restaurants.
