= Indian Hill Village =

- Location: Pomona, California, United States
- Coordinates: 34.062°N 117.721°W
- Address: 1460 E. Holt Avenue
- Opened: 1955
- Closed: 1995
- Developer: John S. Griffith
- Num. of stores: 50+
- Num. of anchor tenants: 2
- Floor area: 650,000 sq ft (60,000 m^{2})
- Floors: 2
- Website: villageatindianhill.com

Indian Hill Village is a former shopping mall in Pomona, California. It has been redeveloped into a multi-use retail, commercial, and educational facility and is now known as The Village @ Indian Hill, comprising 650,000 square feet (60,000 m^{2}) on 39 acres (16 ha).

== History ==
The original, open-air mall was built in the mid-1950s as Pomona Valley Center. Its anchor store, a 111,500-square-foot (10,360 m^{2}) Sears, had been dedicated in November 1954. Inline stores included Long's Drugs, F.C. Nash, and J.J. Newberry. Between 1967 and 1969, the mall was expanded westward. A 100,000-square-foot (9,300 m^{2}) Zody's discount store opened in June 1969 as the center's second anchor. One year later, the F.C. Nash store was sold to Roberts Department Store.

In 1974, the mall was renamed Indian Hill Village, a name the mall owners chose in a contest.

In 1979, there were 19 stores and a total taxable sales of $32 million, ranking 39th out of 52 regional shopping centers in Los Angeles and Orange Counties.

That year, Pomona's redevelopment agency as redevelopers National Redevelopment and American Income Properties announced a $25 million renovation which changed Indian Hill to an air-conditioned enclosed mall aimed at the blue-collar market with four department store anchors (Zody's, Sears, Roberts, and another to be determined) and about 80 other tenants. The renovation was completed in September 1982 and was described as "the largest single commercial development in the city's history". In 1985, Sears moved to the Montclair Plaza Mall.

In 1995, part of the property was acquired by the Pomona Unified School District, which created the nonprofit Pomona Valley Educational Foundation to manage it; the foundation was dissolved in 2010. The conversion of the failing mall into an "impressive" educational facility has been cited as one of the chief accomplishments of then-school superintendent Patrick Leier.

The expanded property now houses multiple educational facilities which serve more than 2,000 students in grades pre-Kindergarten to 14. An eight-screen movie theater formerly in the mall was closed in September 2005, prompting the theater owner to sue the school district, alleging that the lease had been improperly terminated.
