= Whittier Conservancy =

Coalition of citizens in the city of Whittier, California

The Whittier Conservancy is a coalition of citizens in the city of Whittier, California. It was formed after the Whittier Narrows earthquake of October 1, 1987, which had led to the destruction of many historic buildings in Whittier, including the Lindley Building, one of Whittier's "Four Bricks", and the landmark Whittier Theater. In 1989, the Conservancy assisted the City to rezone the residential neighborhoods north of Hadley Street to protect this vital area from rampant, uncontrolled apartment construction. The Conservancy spearheaded the preservation of the historic Whittier Depot and the McGee House. Though primarily a historic preservation organization, the Conservancy is also interested in open space preservation, and is involved in the continuing movement to preserve the Whittier Hills as part of the Puente-Chino Hills Wildlife Corridor

== Cal-Domestic Lawsuit ==
On May 23, 2007, the Conservancy filed suit against the City of Whittier. This was in response to the Whittier City Council overruling the Historic Resources Commission by a 3-2 vote and approving the demolition of three buildings on the California Domestic Water property, across the street from Whitwood Mall, before an environmental impact report had been filed. The Cal-Domestic Lawsuit has been a major event in recent Whittier politics, as it led to the creation of the Coalition for a Better Whittier, a political action committee founded to support the city in the lawsuit (thereby counteracting the influences of the Conservancy) and to push for further mixed-use development in the City of Whittier.
