= 1987 Whittier Narrows earthquake =

Earthquake in southern California

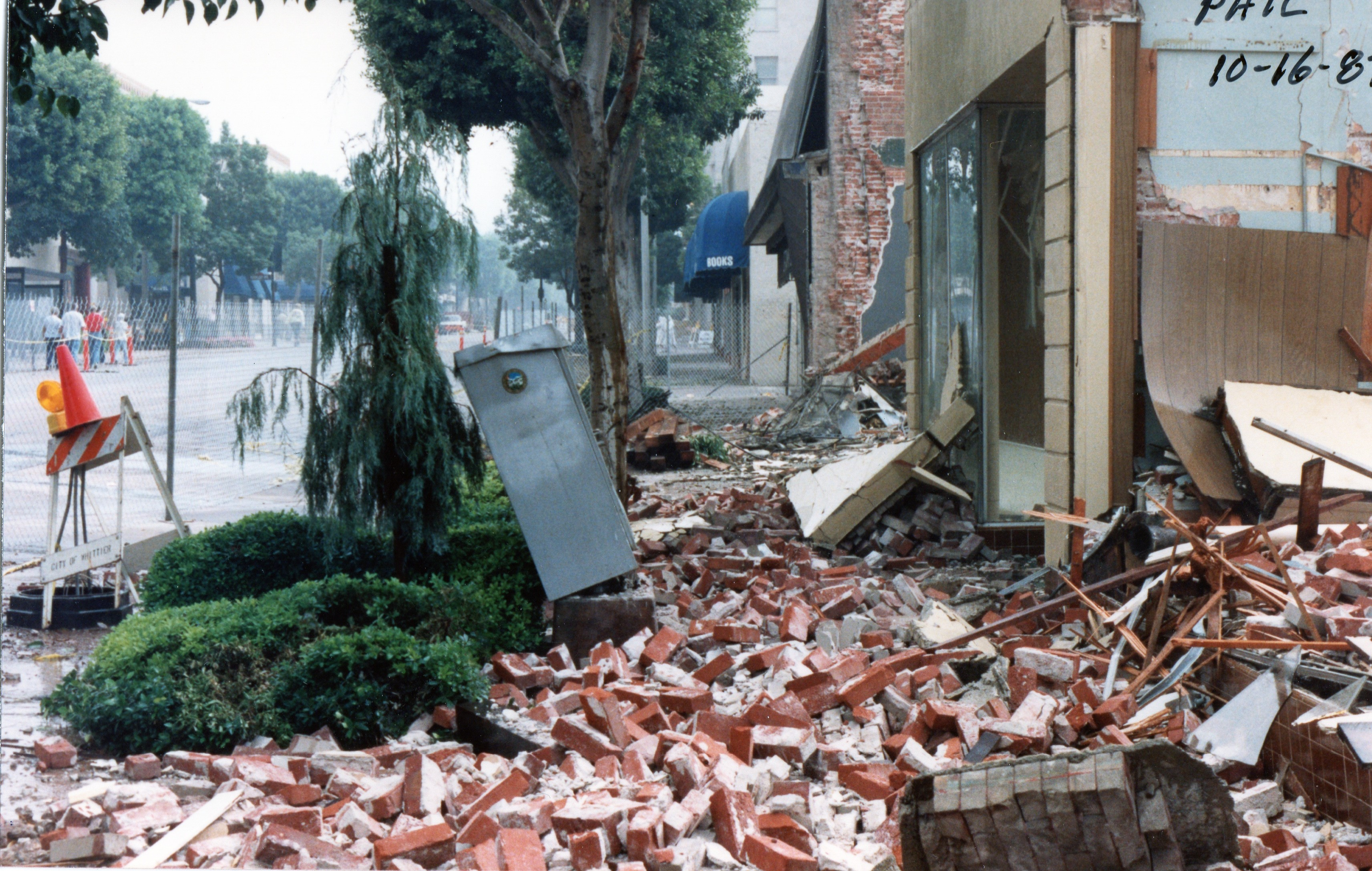
- Earthquake damage to a building on Philadelphia Street in Whittier

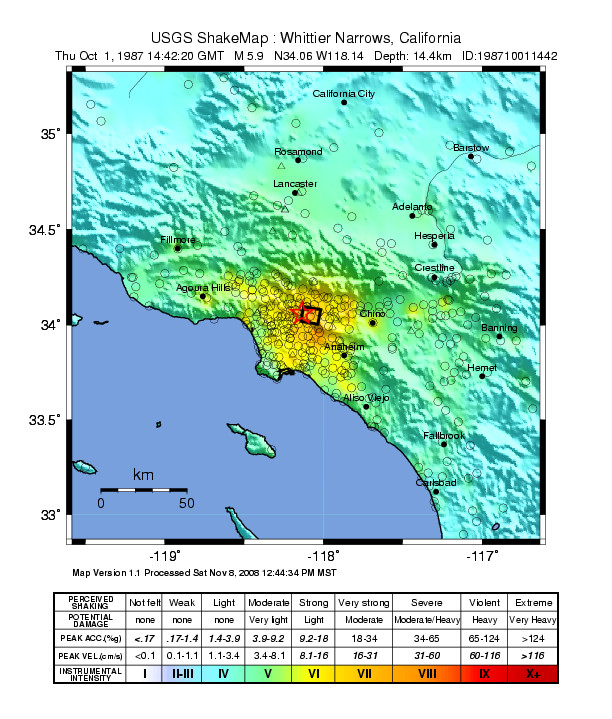
- ShakeMap for the mainshock created by the United States Geological Survey

- UTC time: 1987-10-01 14:42:18
- ISC event: 454412
- USGS-ANSS: ComCat
- Local date: October 1, 1987; 39 years ago
- Local time: 7:42 a.m. PDT
- Magnitude: 5.9 M_{w}
- Depth: 14 km (8.7 mi)
- Epicenter: 34.06°N 118.08°W
- Type: Blind thrust
- Areas affected: Greater Los Angeles; Southern California; United States
- Total damage: $213–358 million
- Max. intensity: MMI VIII (Severe)
- Peak acceleration: 0.63 g
- Aftershocks: 5.3 M_{L} October 4
- Casualties: 8 dead 200 injured

The 1987 Whittier Narrows earthquake occurred in the southern San Gabriel Valley and surrounding communities of Southern California, United States, at 7:42 a.m. PDT on October 1. The moderate magnitude 5.9 blind thrust earthquake was centered several miles north of Whittier in the town of Rosemead, had a relatively shallow depth, and was felt throughout southern California and southern Nevada. Many homes and businesses were affected and many roadways disrupted, mainly in Los Angeles and Orange counties. Damage estimates ranged from $213–358 million, with 200 injuries, three directly related deaths, and five additional fatalities that were associated with the event.

Mercalli intensity values for the greater Los Angeles area varied with ranges from VI (Strong) to VII (Very strong). Only Whittier experienced a level of VIII (Severe), the highest experienced during the event, with the historic uptown area suffering the greatest damage. A separate M5.2 strike-slip event occurred three days later and several kilometers to the northwest that also caused damage and one additional death. Because of the earthquake activity in the Los Angeles Metropolitan area, buildings and other public structures had been equipped with accelerometers, and both the mainshock and the primary aftershock provided additional data for seismologists to analyze and compare with other Southern California events.

== Tectonic setting ==
Beginning with the 1983 Coalinga earthquake, a blind thrust event in the central coast ranges of California, a change in perspective was brought about regarding these types of (concealed) faults. The October 1987 shock occurred on a previously unrecognized blind thrust fault that is now known as the Puente Hills thrust system. The fault was delineated by the mainshock and aftershock focal mechanisms, fault plane reflection studies, and high resolution seismic profiles, which also revealed that the fault runs from downtown Los Angeles to near Puente Hills. The system is considered one of the highest-risk faults in the United States due to its moderate dip and its location under a large metropolitan area.

=== Past seismicity ===
The 1929 Whittier earthquake occurred on July 8 with a local magnitude of 4.7 and maximum perceived intensity of VII (Very strong) on the Mercalli intensity scale. The shock occurred at a depth of 13 km (8.1 mi) and was most intense to the southwest of the city, where a school and two homes were heavily damaged and other homes sustained chimney collapses. In Santa Fe Springs, oil towers were damaged and some short cracks appeared in the ground. This earthquake was felt from Mount Wilson to Santa Ana, and from Hermosa Beach to Riverside. Numerous aftershocks occurred in the first several hours and persisted through early 1931.

== Earthquake ==
The mainshock occurred near the northwestern border of Puente Hills 3 km (1.9 mi) north of the Whittier Narrows at a depth of 14 km (8.7 mi). First motion polarities, along with modeling of teleseismic P and S waves, established that the thrust fault responsible for the shock strikes east–west with a dip of 25° dip to the north. The shock was located adjacent to the west-northwest striking Whittier fault, which is primarily a strike-slip fault, but also has a minor thrust component.

Although most of the Los Angeles metropolitan area saw shaking in line with Mercalli intensity values of VI (Strong) or VII (Very strong), Whittier experienced effects consistent with MMI values of VIII (Severe). The old commercial district suffered the worst damage, as these were the oldest buildings, and were also heavily damaged in the 1929 Whittier earthquake, which may have been the result of movement on the Norwalk Fault.

=== Damage ===
The 7:42 a.m. shock was the strongest in the Los Angeles area since the 1971 San Fernando earthquake and was felt as far as San Diego and San Luis Obispo, California and Las Vegas, Nevada. Communication systems and local media were temporarily impaired and power was cut, leaving numerous early morning workers stranded in disabled elevators. Other minor disruptions included a number of water and gas main breaks, shattered windows and some ceiling collapses. Like the San Fernando earthquake, transportation systems were again affected, but this time it was only the Santa Ana Freeway and San Gabriel River Freeways that were closed near Santa Fe Springs after pieces of concrete were dislodged and cracks were observed in the roadway. Los Angeles County+USC Medical Center took many of the injured, whose injuries were summarized by an emergency room spokesman as very bad to minor, and three people died as a direct result.

While total casualties amounted to eight, the destruction of homes was significant. Throughout Los Angeles, Orange, and Ventura counties, 123 homes and 1,347 apartments were destroyed, and an additional 513 homes and 2,040 apartments were damaged. An inspection of a highway bridge on Interstate 605 revealed that there were fractures on the support columns, which resulted in temporary closure, and minor damage affected 28 other bridges. Other typical failures included more than 1,000 gas leaks, with many resulting in fire, ceramic elements on high-voltage substation equipment breaking and phone systems becoming overwhelmed.

=== Strong motion ===
Caltech scientists recorded the events on a cluster of 12 strong motion sensors that were placed throughout the region, and a total of 87 channels of recorded data. Nine of these instruments were located on the Caltech campus, two were at the nine-story Jet Propulsion Laboratory building 180 (16.2 km (10.1 mi) northwest of the campus), and the final device was placed on a hillside 5 km (3.1 mi) to the west. Investigation of the accelerograms from these units revealed the strongest shaking lasted 4–5 seconds. The vertical accelerations were considered relatively high and early analysis (pre-digitalization) indicated that the mainshock was complex, with a double train of P-waves arriving with a 1.4–1.8 second interval.

The National Strong-Motion Instrumentation Network (NSMIN) (a cooperative effort including the United States Geological Survey and other organizations) also monitored a set of 52 strong motion stations in the Los Angeles area. Most of the stations successfully captured the event, and the closest unit to the mainshock, a rock site at Garvey Reservoir, recorded a peak horizontal acceleration of 0.47 g. A 12-story steel frame building in Alhambra was outfitted with accelerographs in the basement, at mid-level, and the top of the structure. The top floor instruments recorded a peak acceleration of 0.18 g during the 1971 San Fernando earthquake and instruments on the sixth floor recorded a peak acceleration of 0.47 g at the time of the Whittier mainshock. A ten-story reinforced concrete building along 7215 Bright Avenue in Whittier saw a peak horizontal reading of 0.63 g in the basement.

=== Aftershocks ===
A magnitude 5.2 event occurred three days later on October 4, causing additional damage in Alhambra, Pico Rivera, Los Angeles, and Whittier. The shock's effects were assessed at VII (Very strong) on the Mercalli intensity scale with damaged chimneys, broken windows, and the collapse of two bell towers at the San Gabriel Civic Auditorium. This event was also responsible for several injuries and one additional death. On February 11 of the following year, another small aftershock again damaged chimneys, broke windows, cracked drywall, and some homes' foundations in Pico Rivera, Pasadena, and Whittier.

The October 4 aftershock struck 3 km (1.9 mi) to the northwest of the mainshock, and was primarily a strike-slip event on a steeply dipping, northwest-striking fault. The origin of faulting for this event was at a depth of 12 km (7.5 mi), which places it within the hanging wall of the thrust fault that was responsible for the mainshock.

This aftershock was recorded on thirty of the NSMIN stations at distances of up to 57 km (35 mi). The majority of the stations were located in buildings, but nine were located at dams or reservoirs, and four were at Veterans Administration buildings. Lighter accelerations were observed than the main shock, with peak accelerations in the range of 0.15 g – 0.33 g, all occurring at six stations that were within 12 kilometers (7.5 mi) of the epicenter.

== Aftermath ==
In order to gather funds to help the rebuilding effort, the city of Whittier approved the establishment of a 521 acres (2.11 km^{2}) earthquake recovery redevelopment area. Through this initiative, property tax revenue is directed to the city rather than to the county and schools, the originally designated recipients. The arrangement will remain in effect until the year 2037.

A nonprofit organization called the Whittier Conservancy was formed shortly after the earthquake. The group aided in preserving the city's historical style of construction. During the earthquake, several notable buildings were destroyed, including the Harvey Apartments. They were built with bricks that appeared to have been made by hand during the 19th century; the mud used to make these bricks were sourced from the San Gabriel River. The Conservancy felt that these bricks were worth saving, not only for their historical value but also for their aesthetics. Some effort was made to save and use these bricks for rebuilding the historic apartment on the corner of Greenleaf Avenue and Hadley Street. They spent $15,000 to prevent the usable bricks from being taken during the final demolition of the building. These bricks were then cleaned and stored until they could be used in the rebuilding of the apartment. The Whittier Conservancy also collaborated in the rezoning of the Hadley neighborhood and helped control the rate of new multiple-family dwelling construction.

== See also ==
- Bibliography of California history
- List of earthquakes in 1987
- List of earthquakes in California
