= El Rancho =

El Rancho may refer to:

- El Rancho Charter School, a public charter school located in Anaheim, California
- El Rancho High School, a public school in Pico Rivera, California
- El Rancho Hotel & Motel, a Gallup, New Mexico Hotel listed as a National Historic Site
- El Rancho Hotel (Las Vegas), a Las Vegas hotel previously known as the Thunderbird (resort)
- El Rancho Unified School District, the school system in Pico Rivera, California
- El Rancho Vegas, the name of the first hotel on the Las Vegas Strip

Places named El Rancho:

- El Rancho, California
- El Rancho, New Mexico
- El Rancho, Wyoming
- El Rancho, Tabernas

== See also ==
- Rancho (disambiguation)
