= Rancheria Creek =

Rancheria Creek may refer to:

- Rancheria Creek (Tuolumne County, California), a stream in California
- Rancheria Creek (Big Butte Creek tributary), a stream in Oregon

== See also ==
- Rancheria River (disambiguation)
- Rancheria (disambiguation)
