= Ranch (disambiguation) =

A ranch is a place where ranching, a process of raising livestock, especially cattle, is performed.

Ranch may also refer to:

- Dude ranch, a type of ranch catering towards visitors or tourism
- Ranch-style houses, a style of single-story house
- Ranch (brothel), a common term for a legal brothel
- Ranch dressing, a flavor of salad dressing
- John Ranch (1940–2022), Australian rower

== Film and television ==
- The Ranch, a Netflix television sitcom (2016–2020)
- The Ranch (film), an American made-for-television film (2004)
- "Ranch", an episode from season 3 of Man Seeking Woman
- "The Ranch", an episode from season 5 of Paranormal Witness

== Other uses ==
- The Ranch (band), a former three-member country band headed by Keith Urban
  - The Ranch (album), this band's only album
- The Ranch, Minnesota, in La Garde Township, Mahnomen County, Minnesota
- The Ranch, a 1997 novel by Danielle Steel
- "The Ranch", an early nickname for Area 51
- Mega Ranch, a derivative of the Citroën AX

== See also ==
- or
- or
- Rancher (disambiguation)
- Rancheria (disambiguation)
- Rancho (disambiguation)
