= Ellen Ochoa Prep Academy =

High school in California, United States

Coordinates: 33.9699°N 118.1130°W

Information
- School type: Magnet high school
- Established: 2016; 10 years ago
- Closed: 2022
- School district: El Rancho Unified School District
- NCES District ID: 0612180

Ellen Ochoa Prep Academy was a magnet high school in Pico Rivera, California, United States. It was a part of the El Rancho Unified School District. Ochoa Prep provided a college preparatory curriculum.

The school opened in 2016 on the campus of the former Shelby Grove elementary school.

It was offered by the district as an “College Preparatory” school with a curriculum focused on advanced classes. Class sizes were small, with the last class having only 37 students in total.

It closed in 2022 with the class of 2022 being the last class to graduate, as the class of 2023 was transferred to El Rancho High School. The campus is now being used by the El Rancho Adult School
