= Salcido =

Salcido is a Spanish surname. Notable people with the surname include:

- Brian Salcido (born 1985), American ice hockey player
- Carlos Salcido (born 1980), Mexican footballer
- Gregory Salcido (born 1968), American politician
- Ramon Salcido (born 1961), American mass murderer
