= Sandy Dhuyvetter =

- Born: Sandra Jo Dhuyvetter; August 10, 1950 (age 76); Upland, California, United States
- Notable work: Host of TravelTalkRADIO Known as Momma Fett

Comedy career
- Years active: 1989-present
- Medium: MultiMedia, the Web, Print, Twitch, Public Appearances
- Genres: Tourism, Music, Art, Travel, Trafficking Awareness
- Website: http://www.AllMusicConsidered.com

Sandy Dhuyvetter (born Sandra Jo Dhuyvetter on August 10, 1950 in Upland, California) is an American travel media personality, author and travel industry media specialist. Sandy is also known as Momma Fett, from Star Wars.

She is known as Momma Fett, the creator, executive producer and host of the San Diego–based TravelTalkRADIO, a live talk radio program that aired every Sunday from 2001 to 2015. The program focused on tourism and travelling. The program was heard via conventional radio and online in more than 100 countries.

== Career ==
=== Artist ===
Sandy received a degree in Art/illustration and taught Art in Pico Rivera, near Los Angeles, for four years. She then relocated to San Francisco where she started her art career. Most people know Joe Johnston, either through his work on Star Wars or his later work as a director of his own movies. In comparison, few people know Sandy Dhuyvetter's relationship to Boba Fett, but her contributions to the iconic bounty hunter are just as significant. If Joe Johnston is Boba Fett's "dad", then Sandy can be called "Momma Fett".

=== Musician ===
Sandy began music lessons at six years old and continued the classes into her teens. She played her first pro gig for the Chicken Association of Southern California, Chicken Dinner when she was 12 years old. The Gig paid for her folks and her to have dinner. Sandy has been actively playing an accordion her entire adult life as well. She also performed with the DanaLee Wood trio in the late 90s in San Diego County. Currently, she is on Twich.tv with George Powell. The duet is called Dolce and performs three programs each week at http://www.twitch.tv/AllMusicConsidered. They also play music regularly at locations in Leelanau County Michigan and beyond.

=== Radio producer and host ===
Dhuyvetter started her radio program in August 2001 as an online program after her media company went public. In December 2001, TravelTalkRADIO added conventional radio stations to its distribution. Today, TravelTalkRADIO and BusinessTravelRADIO are heard in 185 countries. The show combines "regional, national and international travel topics, up-to-date travel news and interviews with travel experts," according to an article in the San Diego Union-Tribune.

In December 2001, Dhuyvetter debuted on television on KNBC in Los Angeles during the midday news programming. She continued her work on NBC for 18 months and then moved to local CNN, where Dhuyvetter continued to bring the good news of travel to TV viewers. She called her TravelTalkRADIO program one of the first Internet radio shows.

In 2006, TravelTalkRADIO was awarded with the Tanzania Tourist Board's Media Award at the 31st African Travel Association's (ATA) International Congress in Ghana. In 2007, Chinese radio station Voice of Jinling Radio honored Dhuyvetter for her work in co-producing a program dedicated to Sun Yat-sen. The program was jointly produced in China and called "Sandy and Dr. Sun Yat-sen". It was awarded first prize for the 2006 Final Radio Report Contest at Jiangsu Radio Station.

From 2001 to 2015, TravelTalkRADIO was heard on conventional radio in the United States, China and the United Kingdom, via satellite in the Western Hemisphere, South America, North America and the Pacific Rim, and online worldwide. TravelTalkMEDIA, an affiliate of TravelTalkRADIO, encompasses the radio, television and web presence of the company, which was based in California.

=== MultiMedia company founder ===
Dhuyvetter, who has a degree in illustration and design from Arizona State University, became involved in web design and computer graphics in the early 1980s. In 1985 she launched the Electronic Pen, creating computer graphics for corporate clients. With the advent of the Internet, Dhuyvetter's company began developing corporate websites, and developing transaction processing with early innovator Cybercash. Sandy eventually merged with another online business to form CommerceWave and went public in 1997.

=== Children's book illustration ===
Dhuyvetter is the illustrator of the children's book Wiggle-Butts and Up-Faces, which is recommended by the National Swim School Association.

=== Human trafficking awareness trainer ===
Sandy Dhuyvetter was one of the four original trainers of and developers of the Human Trafficking Awareness program designed for the nonprofit organization, Airline Ambassadors International (AAI). The program and training reached major airports around the world and was instrumental in building awareness in the aviation field. While serving as a board member of the AAI for seven years. During that time Sandy also produced and distributed a worldwide radio program called TravelTalkRADIO that actively shared trafficking awareness information. Sandy has spoken and taught trafficking awareness at travel conferences in London, Berlin, Buenos Aires and major airports in the US.

== Accomplishments ==
Dhuyvetter serves on the Department of Homeland Security's Secure Borders and Open Doors Advisory Committee and as a member of the board of advisors for Christelijke Hogeschool Noord (CHN) University's Department of Media and Entertainment Management. CHN University is headquartered in Leeuwarden, Netherlands.
