= Ellen Ochoa =

American astronaut and engineer (born 1958)

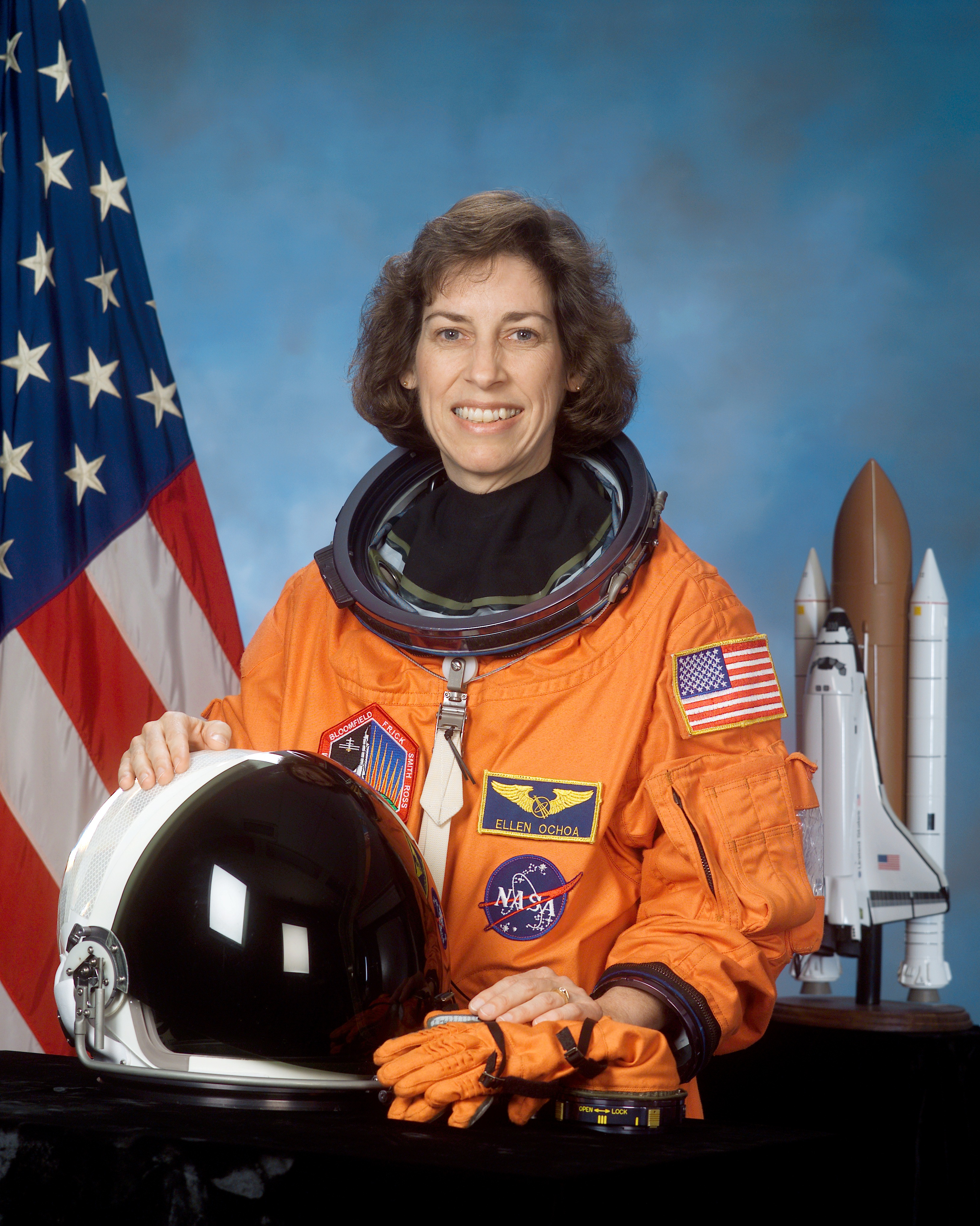
- Ochoa in 2002
- Born: May 10, 1958 (age 68); Los Angeles, California, U.S.
- Education: San Diego State University (BS); Stanford University (MS, PhD)
- Space career

NASA astronaut
- Time in space: 41d 19h 35m
- Selection: NASA Group 13 (1990)
- Mission: STS-56; STS-66; STS-96; STS-110
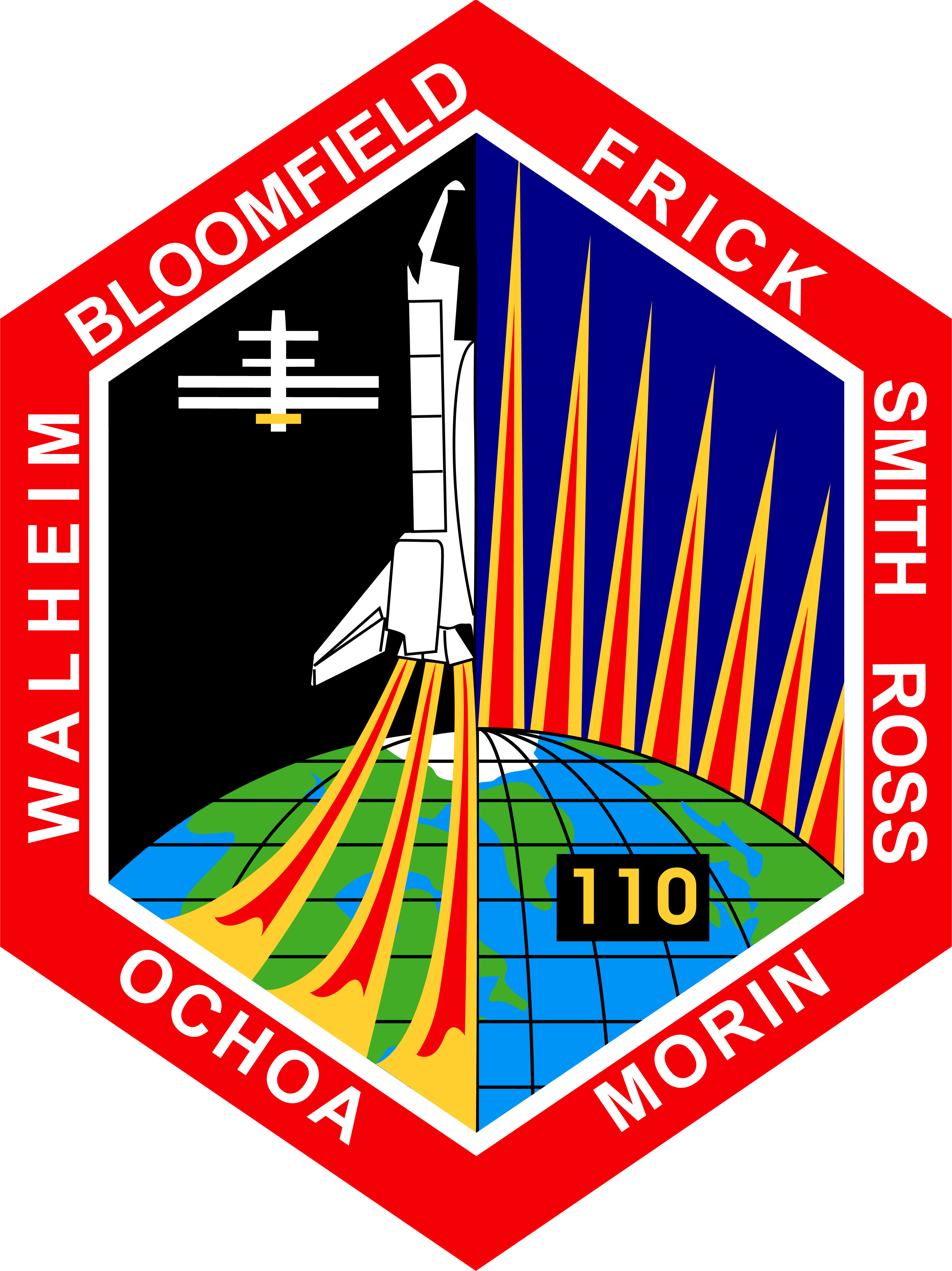
- Mission insignia

Ellen Ochoa (born May 10, 1958) is an American engineer, former astronaut and former director of the Johnson Space Center. In 1993, Ochoa became the first Latina to go to space when she served on a nine-day mission aboard the Space Shuttle Discovery. Ochoa became director of the center upon the retirement of the previous director, Michael Coats, on December 31, 2012. She was the first Latina director and the second female director of Johnson Space Center.

== Early life and education ==
Ellen Lauri Ochoa was born on May 10, 1958, in Los Angeles, California, to Joseph and Rosanne (née Deardorff) Ochoa. Her paternal grandparents immigrated from Sonora, Mexico, to Arizona and later to California where her father was born. She grew up in La Mesa, California. Ochoa was the middle child of five and neither parent had college degrees. Ochoa's mother, Rosanne, began attending college when Ellen was still a baby. She wanted to set an example for her children by continuing her education.

Her parents divorced when she was in middle school and she lived with her mother and her brothers. Ochoa graduated from Grossmont High School in El Cajon in 1975.

Ochoa received a Bachelor of Science degree in physics from San Diego State University and graduated Phi Beta Kappa in 1980, before earning a Master of Science degree and a doctorate from Stanford Department of Electrical Engineering in 1981 and 1985, respectively. During her time at San Diego State University she found that she loved physics, math, and engineering; ultimately, deciding to major in physics and electrical engineering from Stanford.

== Career ==
=== Research ===
As a doctoral student at Stanford, and later as a researcher at Sandia National Laboratories and the NASA Ames Research Center, Ochoa investigated optical systems for performing information processing. At the NASA Ames Research Center, she led a research group working primarily on optical systems for automated space exploration. At Sandia National Laboratories, she applied what she knew about optics to the research being done on nuclear weapons. She had three patents for her work in optical systems. The first patent was for an optical inspection system that was designed to detect defects in repeating patterns. This was beneficial to analyze impurities in materials such as semiconductors to help with quality control. Her second patent was for an automated inspection system. This system was also designed to analyze manufactured components for imperfections or defects. Her third patent was for a method and apparatus designed to recognize texture patterns from photos.

Ochoa was enticed by optical systems and committed to improving its applications for performing information processing. She wanted to help computers "see". NASA later recognized her methods in optics could be used in fabricating such as inspecting for flaws, or it might be used on a space vehicle such as the Rover.

As Chief of the Intelligent Systems Technology Branch at Ames, she supervised 35 engineers and scientists in the research and development of computational systems for aerospace missions. Ochoa has presented numerous papers at technical conferences.

She was selected as part of the 1990 class of astronauts.

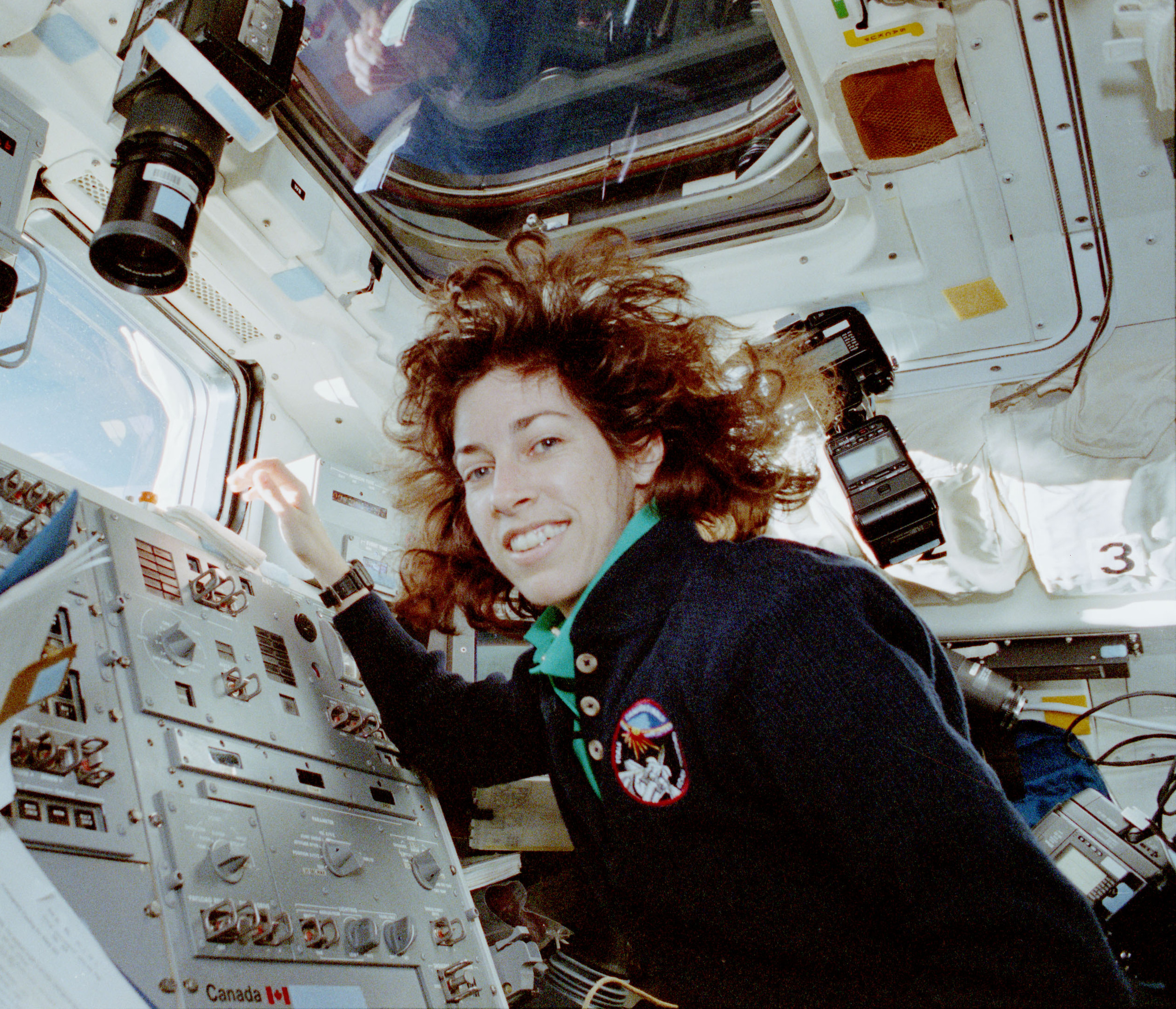
Ochoa aboard Space Shuttle Discovery during STS-56 in 1993

Ellen Ochoa was selected by NASA in January 1990 and became an astronaut in July 1991. Her technical assignments in the Astronaut Office included serving as the crew representative for flight software, computer hardware and robotics, Assistant for Space Station to the Chief of the Astronaut Office, lead spacecraft communicator (CAPCOM) in Mission Control and acting as Deputy Chief of the Astronaut Office.

Ochoa became the first Hispanic woman to go to space when she served on a nine-day mission aboard the Space Shuttle Discovery in 1993. The purpose of the Shuttle mission was to study the Earth's ozone layer. A veteran of four space flights, Ochoa has logged nearly 1000 hours in space. She was a mission specialist on STS-56 (1993), was payload commander on STS-66, and was mission specialist and flight engineer on STS-96 and STS-110 in 2002. Her third trip was for the STS-96 mission, which was a significant trip as it marked the first docking of a space shuttle with the International Space Station. On this mission, the crew delivered supplies, equipment, and performed a few experiments with the ISS. Dr. Ochoa's last trip was for the STS-110 mission, which was focused on the assembly of the ISS. Ochoa was in Mission Control during the Space Shuttle Columbia disaster and was one of the first personnel informed of television coverage showing Columbia's disintegration.

From 2007, after retiring from spacecraft operations, Ochoa served as deputy director of NASA's Johnson Space Center, helping to manage and direct the Astronaut Office and Aircraft Operations. Another milestone was her becoming director of the Flight Crew Operations Directorate after she was deputy. She also has a Barbie doll of her that was released in 2025 to honor woman’s history month.On January 1, 2013, Ochoa became the first Hispanic and second female director of the Johnson Space Center. However, in the year 2018, Ochoa planned on retiring. Between November 2024 and June 2025, she was on the board of Nvidia.

Ochoa was named vice chair of the National Science Board for the 2018–2020 term. She currently chairs the committee evaluating nominations for the National Medal of Technology and Innovation.

== Personal life ==
Ochoa's husband is Coe Miles, an intellectual property attorney. They have two sons. Ochoa is a classical flutist and played with the Stanford Symphony Orchestra, once receiving the Student Soloist Award. While an undergraduate at San Diego State University, she played the flute for two years as part of the university marching band and for five years as a member of the university wind ensemble. She took a flute with her on her first mission to space.

== Recognition ==
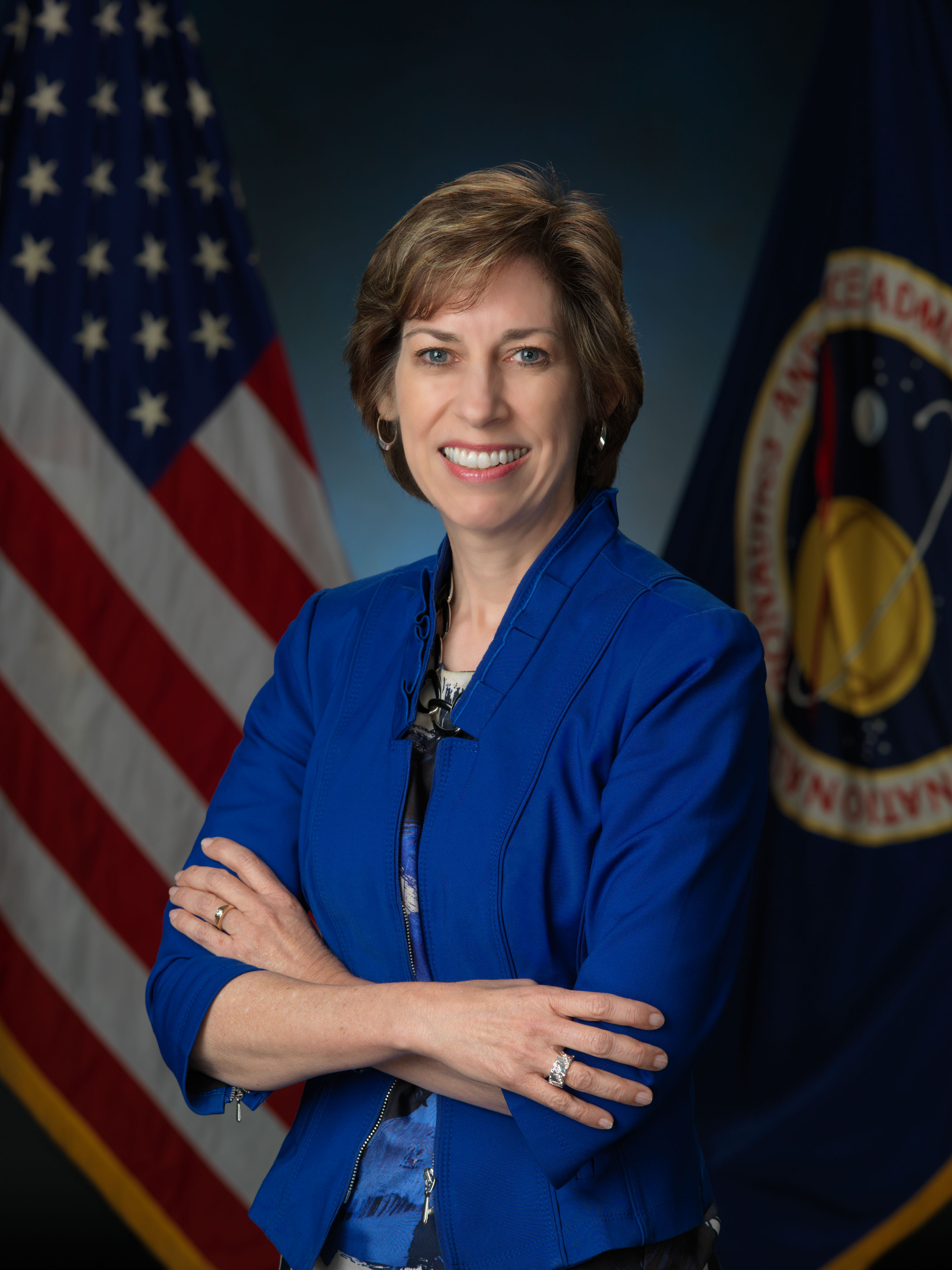
Ochoa in 2014

The Ochoa Middle School located in Pasco, Washington, the Ellen Ochoa Elementary School in Cudahy, California, and the Ánimo Ellen Ochoa Charter Middle School in East Los Angeles are named in her honor. In addition, Grand Prairie, Texas has the Ellen Ochoa STEM Academy at Ben Milam Elementary School and Pico Rivera, California has the Ellen Ochoa Prep Academy. Union Public Schools in Tulsa named a new elementary school after her as well, as did the school system in Passaic, New Jersey.

A flag with the rocket logo of the Ochoa Middle School in Pasco, Washington, flew with Ochoa in April 2002 aboard the Shuttle Atlantis for an 11-day mission to the International Space Station. Ochoa returned the flag to the school when she visited as a special guest at the 2002 dedication and it remains on permanent display.

Ochoa has received many awards among which are NASA's Distinguished Service Medal (2015), Exceptional Service Medal (1997), Outstanding Leadership Medal (1995) and Space Flight Medals (2002, 1999, 1994, 1993). Ochoa and Michael Foale were announced as the 2017 class of the United States Astronaut Hall of Fame. Ochoa was recognized in Hispanic Executive's 2017 Best of the Boardroom issue for her work as a board director for Johnson Space Center. She was inducted into the 2018 International Air and Space Hall of Fame class.

Ochoa is a Fellow of American Association for the Advancement of Science, the American Institute of Aeronautics and Astronautics, the National Academy of Inventors, and Optica.

An animated version of Ochoa was featured in the 2019 episode "Astronaut Ellen Ochoa" of the children's television program, Ready Jet Go!. In 2024, Ochoa was awarded the Presidential Medal of Freedom by President Joe Biden.

In honor of Hispanic Heritage month Mattel in 2025 released a special edition Ellen Ochoa barbie doll, celebrating her accomplishments in within the STEM community. Additionally, she wrote We Are All Scientists, a bilingual STEM book for children published in 2022.

== See also ==
- List of Hispanic astronauts
