= Rancho =

Rancho or Ranchos may refer to:

== Settlements and communities ==
- Rancho, Aruba, former fishing village and neighbourhood of Oranjestad
- Ranchos of California, 19th century land grants in Alta California
  - List of California Ranchos
- Ranchos, Buenos Aires in Argentina

== Schools ==
- Rancho Christian School in Temecula, California
- Rancho High School in North Las Vegas, Nevada
- Rancho San Joaquin Middle School in Irvine, California
- Rancho Solano Preparatory School in Scottsdale, Arizona
- Rancho Verde High School in Moreno Valley, California

== Film ==
- Rancho, a character in the Bollywood film 3 Idiots
- Rancho (monkey), an Indian monkey animal actor

== Other ==
- Rancho, a shock absorber brand by Tenneco Automotive
- Rancho carnavalesto or Rancho, a type of dance club from Rio de Janeiro, Brazil
- Rancho Los Amigos National Rehabilitation Center or Rancho
- Rancho Point, a rock headland in the South Shetland Islands
- Matra Rancho or Rancho, an early French leisure activity vehicle

== See also ==
- El Rancho (disambiguation)
- Rancheria (disambiguation)
- Ranchero (disambiguation)
- Ranch (disambiguation)
