= Gregory Salcido =

American mayor (born 1968)

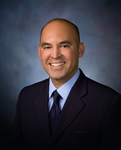
Gregory Salcido

Gregory Salcido (born July 4, 1968) is a former Pico Rivera mayor and city councilman, a former candidate for Congress, and a former educator in Pico Rivera, California. Concurrently with his position as city councilman, Salcido served as mayor of Pico Rivera in 2002, 2010 and 2015. His derogatory comments about members of the United States armed forces, captured on video by one of his students, went viral in January 2018, leading to calls for his eventual dismissal as both teacher and city councilman in March 2018.

== Early life ==
Salcido was born in East Los Angeles, California, in 1968 to first-generation Mexican-Americans. His grandparents emigrated from Torreón, Coahuila in northeast Mexico. His father was a steelworker. Salcido graduated from El Rancho High School, where he would later become a teacher, in 1986.

Salcido received his bachelor's degree in history from Whittier College. He started teaching in 1998 a few months after graduating from college. A year later, Salcido ran for and won a position on the Pico Rivera City Council.

== Career and controversies as educator ==
Salcido began his teaching career at his alma mater, El Rancho High School, in 1998. His tenure there was marred by controversy. On three separate occasions, he was put on administrative leave.

In 2005, a parent complained about a class discussion about masturbation. Investigators with the Los Angeles Sheriff's Department cleared Salcido of any wrongdoing.

In July 2010, Salcido was reprimanded and placed on administrative leave after a parent complained about his conduct in the classroom. A parent alleged that his Anglo-American 16-year-old daughter had been threatened by Salcido, and that Salcido had made inappropriate insulting comments about race, other students and parents. One student complained that Salcido had said, "Shut up, Kelly, before I kill you."

In May 2012, Salcido was placed on administrative leave after the Los Angeles County Sheriff's Department received a complaint that he had struck an Anglo-American student. Salcido admitted striking the student, and said the student had been disruptive by sleeping in class. The child, named David, also alleged that Salcido bullied him in a sexually derisive and dismissive manner based on the boy's weight and appearance, calling him "Chaz Bono".

In January 2018, a student recorded a video in his classroom of Salcido lecturing about the U.S. military after Salcido noticed a student wearing a Marine Corps shirt. Salcido's disparaging remarks about U.S. servicemen attracted widespread local, statewide and nationwide media attention. The video, which was laced with profanity, caused a nationwide furor, with people across the country calling for Salcido's termination by the El Rancho Unified School District and removal from the Pico Rivera City Council. In the video, Salcido said, "We’ve got a bunch of dumbshits over there. Think about the people who you know who are over there, your freaking stupid uncle Louis or whatever; they’re dumbshits. They’re not like high-level thinkers, they’re not academic people, they’re not intellectual people, they’re the freaking lowest of our low. Not morally, I’m not saying they make bad moral decisions, they’re not talented people."

In the video, Salcido questioned the military's ability to succeed in its ongoing operations in the Middle East, saying, "We all have night-vision goggles, all that kind of stuff, and we can’t freakin’ control these dudes wearing freakin’ robes and chanclas [flip-flops] because we have a bunch of dumbshits over there." Salcido also referred to military actions during the Vietnam War as fighting a "bunch of people this freakin' big throwing rice at us." He questioned why the school would allow the military to recruit students, saying, "I don’t understand why we let the freakin’ military guys come over here and recruit you at school. We don’t have pimps come into school. Anyone interested in being a hoe [whore]?" According to the student who made the video, Salcido has a history of making anti-military statements.

As a result of his videotaped comments, Salcido was placed on administrative leave pending the results of an investigation.

On March 21, 2018, School Board President Aurora Villon announced that the El Rancho Unified School District had voted unanimously on March 20 to terminate Salcido from his teaching position.

In April 2018, the El Rancho Unified School District released an official report on Salcido's tenure in the school district, which found an ongoing history of questionable and abusive behavior towards students who were pro-military, Christian, LGBT, Anglo-American, and Asian-American. One counselor told investigators that they had had to move over 25 students from Salcido's classes over the years for the students' well-being, due to berating behavior from Salcido. The report also stated that Salcido had used his district-owned computer to save nude images of women (a violation of the district's technology use policies), used corporal punishment in the classroom, used racial slurs, refused to follow district policies, and repeatedly lied during the investigation.

== Political career ==
Salcido has served on the Pico Rivera City Council since 2000. He has been at odds with the council on several key issues. Generally regarded as a progressive Democrat, Salcido has taken positions on the left wing of the Democratic Party, such as his decision in January 2010 to remove the Bible from the City Council dais for violating the Constitution's Establishment Clause.

In 2002, while serving as mayor of Pico Rivera, Salcido ran for California's 38th congressional district and raised $62,000, but lost in the Democratic primary to Grace Napolitano.

Salcido has served as a member of the History and Heritage Society Committee and has represented the city in various countywide organizations, such as the Los Angeles County City Selection Committee and the Sanitation Districts of Los Angeles County.

In 2004, a committee was organized to recall Salcido and two other council members after the three approved a $40,000 raise for the then city manager, but the recall effort failed.

In 2012, Salcido was fined $2,500 by the California Fair Political Practices Commission for campaign finance violations. This fine was in connection to a cash donation by the El Rodeo Nightclub of $2,000, which is more than the California limit of $100 on cash donations. The nightclub had been raided by the Drug Enforcement Administration and Federal Bureau of Investigation due to suspected drug money laundering. The nightclub had been a source of complaints by residents and other city council members, but Salcido never took any action as councilman on those complaints.

== Aftermath of video controversy ==
On January 29, 2018, the City Council censured Salcido for his comments after his videotaped anti-military tirade, although there are questions about whether the First Amendment allows a city government to take action for unpopular speech. The City Council released a statement unanimously condemning Salcido's remarks. Salcido is forbidden from chairing or participating in any committees.

A Pico Rivera eatery, Zapien's Salsa Grill, removed a popular lunch special named after Salcido after the video surfaced. The lunch special, called "The Mayor," was a common dish consisting of two enchiladas frequently ordered by Salcido, a regular at the restaurant. In a statement, the restaurant's proprietor said, "I am outraged by what he said against our military personnel and our veterans."

On Friday, February 2, classes at El Rancho were cancelled, as a protest took place across the street from the school. The event was covered by local media sources.

Salcido was finally fired by the El Rancho Unified School District on March 20, 2018. The event caused explosive cheering when the results of an investigation was announced to the general public at a school board meeting.
