= Johnson Space Center =

NASA operations facility in Texas

Lyndon B. Johnson Space Center

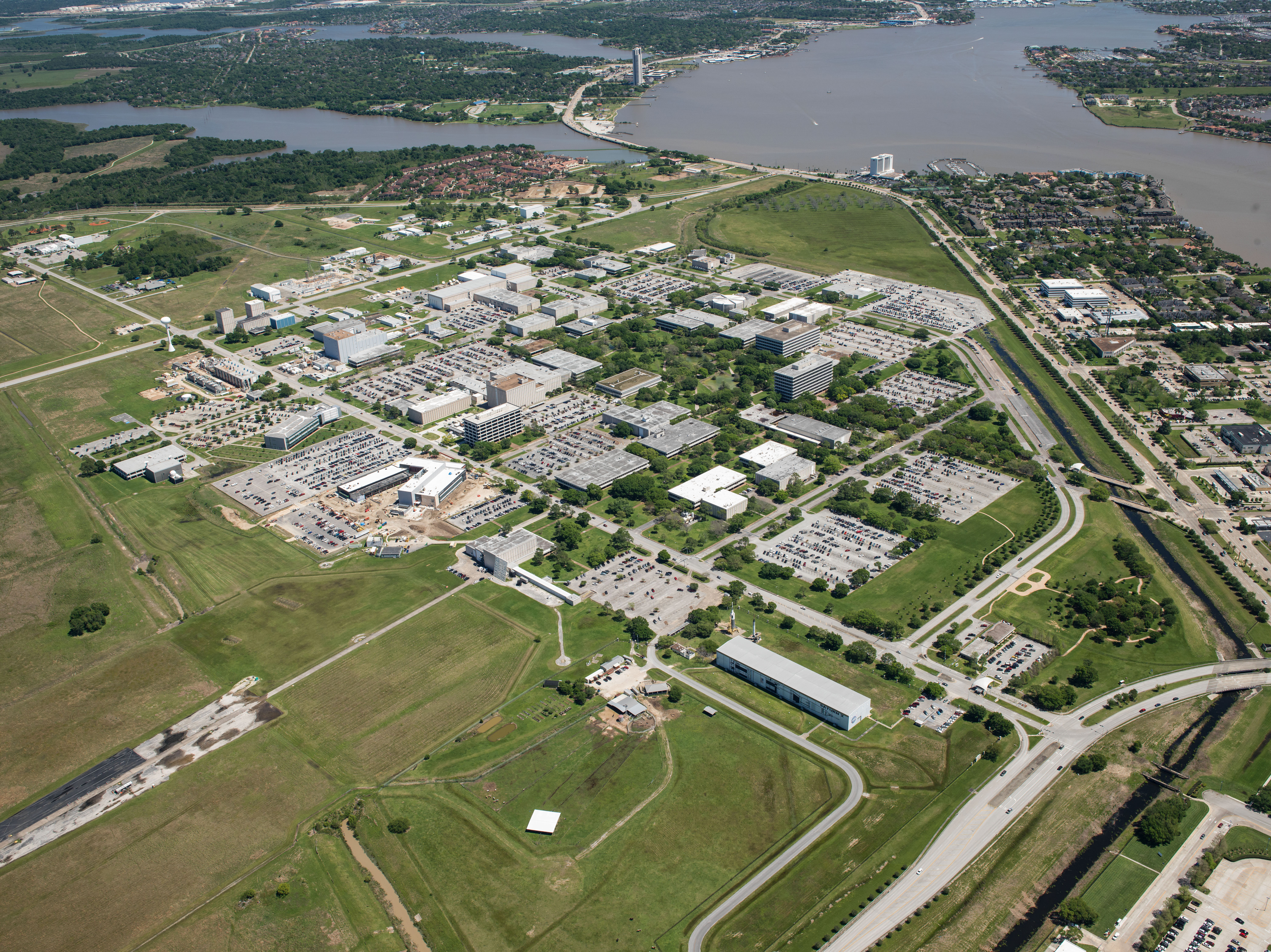
- Aerial view of Johnson Space Center, 2017

Agency overview
- Formed: November 1, 1961; 65 years ago
- Preceding agency: Space Task Group
- Jurisdiction: Federal government of the United States
- Headquarters: Houston, Texas, United States; 29°33′30″N 95°05′20″W
- Employees: 12,541 civil servants and contractors (2024)
- Annual budget: US$5.43 billion (2024)
- Agency executive: Vanessa E. Wyche, director
- Parent agency: NASA
- Child agency: White Sands Test Facility
- Website: nasa.gov/johnson

The Lyndon B. Johnson Space Center (JSC) is NASA's center for human spaceflight in Houston, Texas (originally named the Manned Spacecraft Center), where human spaceflight training, research, and flight control are conducted. It was renamed in honor of the late U.S. president and Texas native, Lyndon B. Johnson, by an act of the United States Senate on February 19, 1973.

JSC consists of a complex of 100 buildings constructed on 1,620 acres (660 ha) in Clear Lake. The center is home to NASA's astronaut corps, and is responsible for training astronauts from both the U.S. and its international partners. It also houses the Christopher C. Kraft Jr. Mission Control Center, which has provided the flight control function for every NASA human spaceflight since Gemini 4 (including Apollo, Skylab, Apollo–Soyuz, Space Shuttle and Artemis). It is popularly known by its radio call signs "Mission Control" and "Houston".

The original Manned Spacecraft Center grew out of the Space Task Group (STG) headed by Robert R. Gilruth that was formed to coordinate the U.S. crewed spaceflight program. The STG was based at the Langley Research Center in Hampton, Virginia, but reported organizationally to the Goddard Space Flight Center just outside Washington, D.C. To meet the growing needs of the US human spaceflight program, plans began in 1961 to expand its staff to its own organization, and move it to a new facility. This was constructed in 1962 and 1963 on land donated by the Humble Oil company through Rice University, and officially opened its doors in September 1963. Today, JSC is one of ten major NASA field centers and the city of Houston's primary cultural footprint, earning it the official nickname "Space City" in 1967.

== History ==
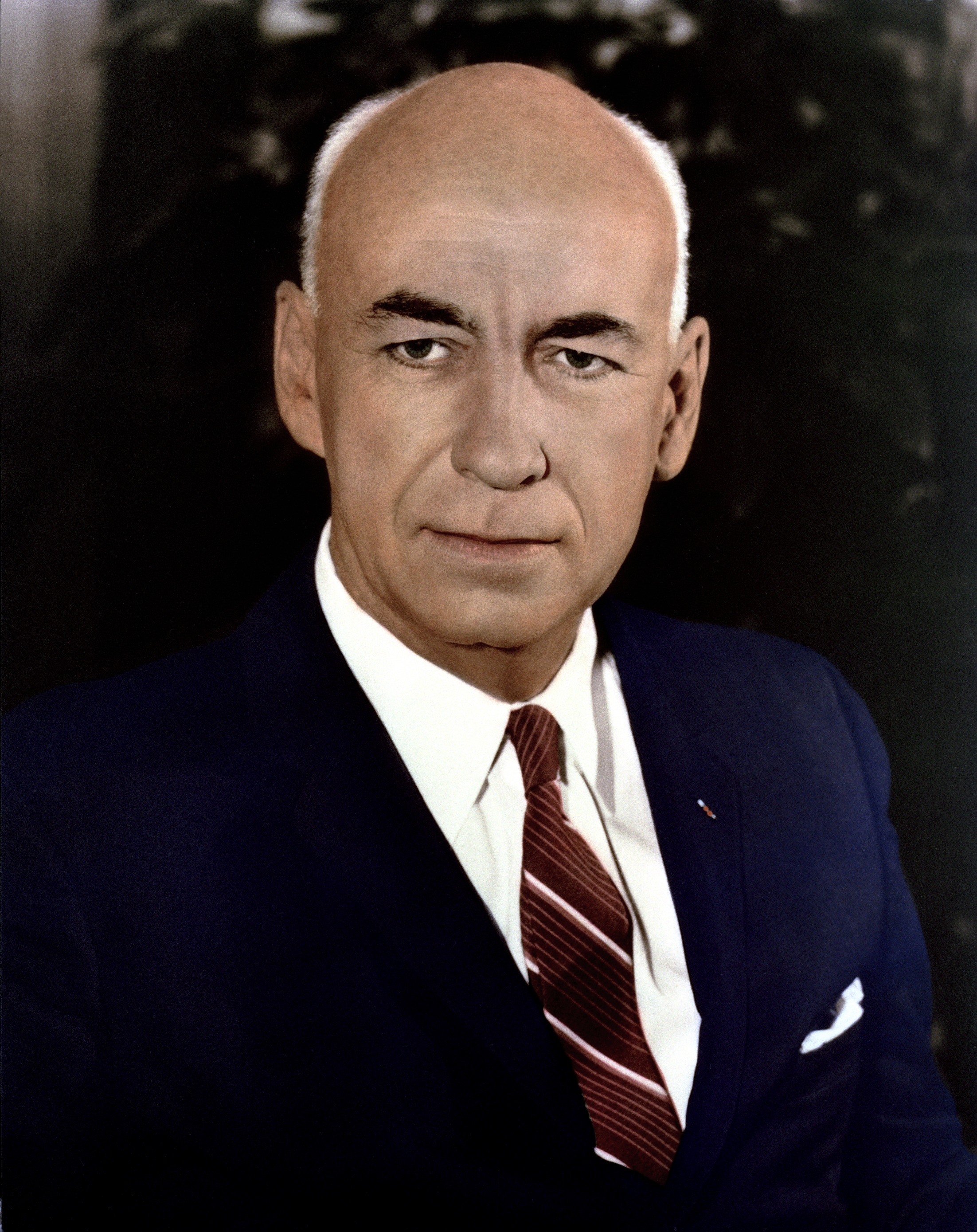
Robert R. Gilruth, leader of the Space Task Group, became NASA's first director of the Manned Spacecraft Center in 1961.

Johnson Space Center has its origins in NASA's Space Task Group (STG). Starting on November 5, 1958, Langley Research Center engineers under Robert R. Gilruth directed Project Mercury and follow-on crewed space programs. The STG originally reported to the Goddard Space Flight Center organization, with a total staff of 45, including 37 engineers, and eight secretaries and human "computers" (women who ran calculations on mechanical adding machines). In 1959, the center added 32 Canadian engineers put out of work by the cancellation of the Avro Canada CF-105 Arrow project. NASA's first administrator, T. Keith Glennan, realized that the growth of the U.S. space program would cause the STG to outgrow the Langley and Goddard centers and require its own location. On January 1, 1961, he wrote a memo to his yet-unnamed successor (who turned out to be James E. Webb), recommending a new site be chosen. Later that year, when President John F. Kennedy set the goal to put a person on the Moon by the end of the decade, it became clear Gilruth would need a larger organization to lead the Apollo Program, with new test facilities and research laboratories.

=== Site selection ===
In 1961, Congress held hearings and passed a $1.7 billion 1962 NASA appropriations bill which included $60 million for the new crewed spaceflight laboratory. A set of requirements for the new site was drawn up and released to the Congress and general public. These included: access to water transport by large barges, a moderate climate, availability of all-weather commercial jet service, a well-established industrial complex with supporting technical facilities and labor, close proximity to a culturally attractive community in the vicinity of an institution of higher education, a strong electric utility and water supply, at least 1,000 acres (400 ha) of land, and certain specified cost parameters. In August 1961, Webb asked associate director of the Ames Research Center John F. Parsons to head a site-selection team, which included Philip Miller, Wesley Hjornevik, and I. Edward Campagna, the construction engineer for the STG. The team initially came up with a list of 22 cities based on the climate and water criteria, then cut this to a short list of nine with nearby federal facilities:

- Jacksonville, Florida (Green Cove Springs Naval Air Station)
- Tampa, Florida (MacDill Air Force Base)
- Baton Rouge, Louisiana
- Shreveport, Louisiana (Barksdale Air Force Base)
- Houston, Texas (San Jacinto Ordnance Depot)
- Victoria, Texas (FAA Airport; former Foster Air Force Base)
- Corpus Christi, Texas (Naval Air Station Corpus Christi)
- San Diego, California (Camp Elliott)
- San Francisco, California (Benicia Arsenal)

Another 14 sites were then added, including two additional Houston sites chosen because of proximity to Rice University. The team visited all 23 sites between August 21 and September 7, 1961. During these visits, Massachusetts Governor John A. Volpe and Senator Margaret Chase Smith headed a delegation which exerted particularly strong political pressure, prompting a personal inquiry to Webb from President Kennedy. Senators and congressmen from sites in Missouri and California similarly lobbied the selection team. Proponents of sites in Boston, Massachusetts, Rhode Island, and Norfolk, Virginia, went so far as to make separate presentations to Webb and the headquarters staff, so Webb added these additional sites to the final review.

Following its tour, the team identified MacDill Air Force Base in Tampa as its first choice, based on the fact the Air Force was planning to close down its Strategic Air Command operations there. The Houston Rice University site was second, and the Benicia Ordnance Depot in San Francisco was third. Before a decision could be made, however, the Air Force decided not to close MacDill, omitting it from consideration and moving the Rice University site to first place. Webb informed President Kennedy on September 14 of the decision made by him and deputy administrator Hugh Dryden in two separate memoranda, one reviewing the criteria and procedures, and the other stating: "Our decision is that this laboratory should be located in Houston, Texas, in close association with Rice University and the other educational institutions there and in that region." The Executive Office and NASA made advance notifications of the award, and the public announcement of the location followed on September 19, 1961. According to Texas A&M University historian Henry C. Dethloff, "Although the Houston site neatly fit the criteria required for the new center, Texas undoubtedly exerted an enormous political influence on such a decision. Lyndon B. Johnson was Vice President and head of the Space Council, Albert Thomas headed the House Appropriations Committee, Bob Casey and Olin E. Teague were members of the House Committee on Science and Astronautics, and Teague headed the Subcommittee on Manned Space Flight. Finally, Sam Rayburn was Speaker of the House of Representatives."

The land for the new facility was 1,000 acres (400 ha) donated to Rice by the Humble Oil company, situated in an undeveloped area 25 mi (40 km) southeast of Houston adjacent to Clear Lake near Galveston Bay. At the time, the land was used to graze cattle. Immediately after Webb's announcement, Gilruth and his staff began planning the move from Langley to Houston, using what would grow to 295,996 ft^{2} (27,498.9 m^{2}) of leased office and laboratory space in 11 scattered sites. On November 1, the conversion of the Task Group to JSC became official.

=== Construction and early operations ===
Tracts of land in the vicinity of the Manned Spacecraft Center were either owned or being under exclusive control of Joseph L. Smith & Associates, Inc. NASA purchased an additional 600 acres (240 ha) so the property would face a highway, and the total included another 20 acres (8.1 ha) reserve drilling site. Construction of the center, designed by Charles Luckman, began in April 1962, and Gilruth's new organization was formed and moved to the temporary locations by September. That month, Kennedy gave a speech at Rice University on the U.S. space program. The speech is famous for highlighting the Apollo program, but Kennedy also made reference to the new Center:

What was once the furthest outpost on the old frontier of the West will be the furthest outpost on the new frontier of science and space. Houston, ... with its Manned Spacecraft Center, will become the heart of a large scientific and engineering community. During the next 5 years the National Aeronautics and Space Administration expects to double the number of scientists and engineers in this area, to increase its outlays for salaries and expenses to $60 million a year; to invest some $200 million in plant and laboratory facilities; and to direct or contract for new space efforts over $1 billion from this Center in this City.

— John F. Kennedy, Speech at Rice University, September 12, 1962

The 1,620-acre (6.6 km^{2}) facility was officially opened for business in September 1963.

==== Mission Control Center ====
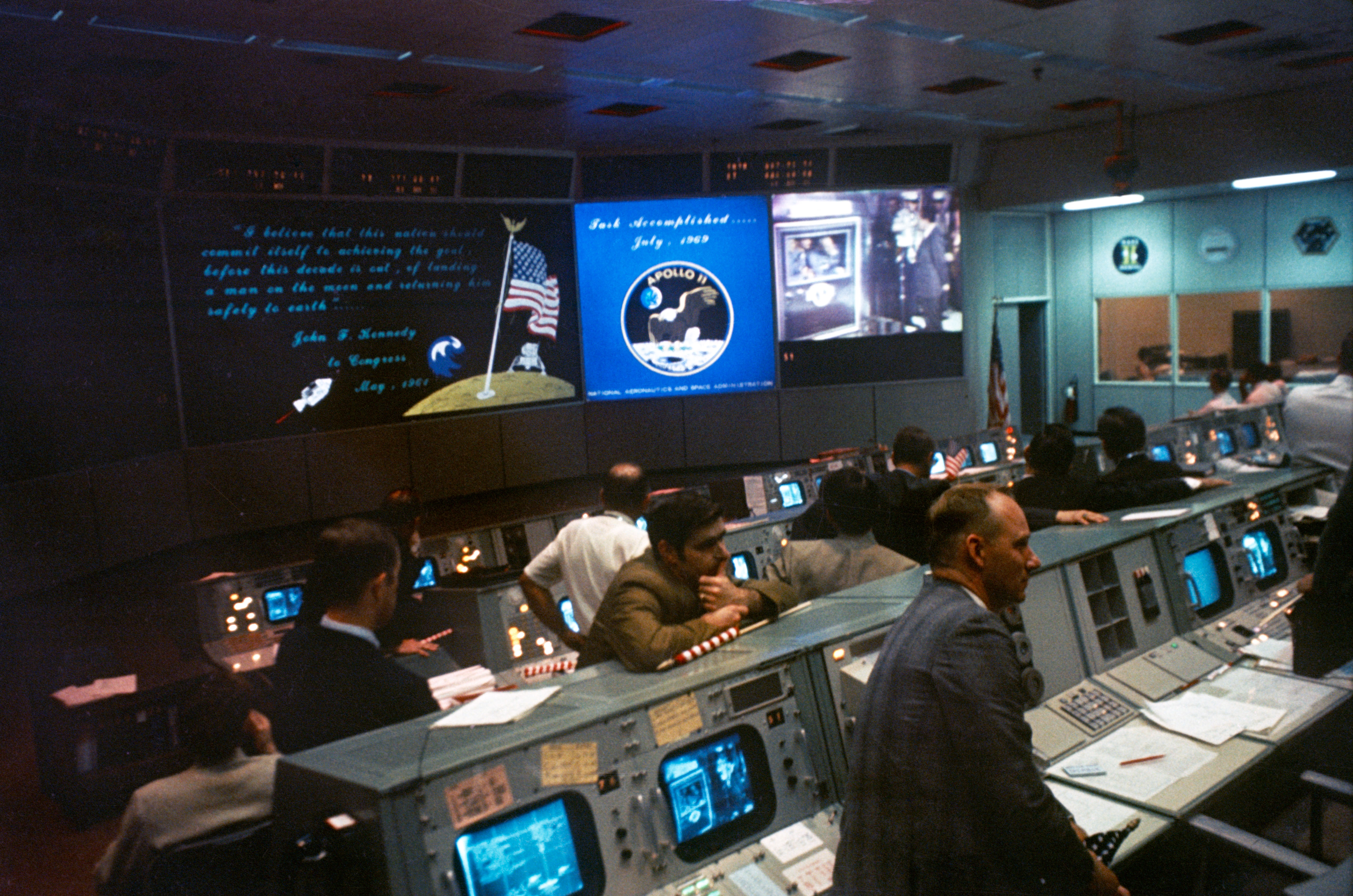
Mission Operations Control Room 2 at the conclusion of Apollo 11 in 1969

In 1961, as plans for Project Gemini began, it became increasingly clear that the Mercury Control Center located at the Cape Canaveral Air Force Station launch center would become inadequate to control missions with maneuverable spacecraft such as Gemini and Apollo. Christopher Kraft and three other flight controllers began studying what was needed for an improved control center, and directed a study contract awarded to Philco's Western Development Laboratory. Philco bid on and won the contract to build the electronic equipment for the new Mission Control Center, which would be located in Building 30 of JSC rather than Canaveral or the Goddard Space Flight Center in Maryland. Construction began in 1963.

The new center had two Mission Operations Control Rooms, allowing training and preparation for a later mission to be carried out while a live mission is in progress. It was brought online for testing purposes during the uncrewed Gemini 2 flight in January 1965 and the first crewed Gemini flight, Gemini 3 in March 1965, though the Mercury Control Center still retained primary responsibility for control of these flights. It became fully operational for the flight of Gemini 4 the following June, and has been the primary flight control center for all subsequent U.S. crewed space missions from Project Gemini forward.

NASA named the center the Christopher C. Kraft Jr. Mission Control Center on April 14, 2011.

=== Apollo program ===
In addition to housing NASA's astronaut operations, JSC is also the site of the former Lunar Receiving Laboratory, where the first astronauts returning from the Moon were quarantined, and where the majority of lunar samples are stored. The center's Landing and Recovery Division operated MV Retriever in the Gulf of Mexico for Gemini and Apollo astronauts to practice water egress after splashdown.

On February 19, 1973, four weeks after Johnson's death, President Richard Nixon signed into law a Senate resolution renaming the Manned Spacecraft Center in his honor. As Senate Majority Leader, Johnson had sponsored the 1958 legislation which created NASA; dedication ceremonies were held six months later on August 27.

One of the artifacts displayed at Johnson Space Center is the Saturn V rocket. It is whole, except for the ring between the S-IC and S-II stages, and the fairing between the S-II and S-IVB stages, and made of actual surplus flight-ready articles. It also has real (though incomplete) Apollo command and service modules, intended to fly in the canceled Apollo 19 mission.

In June 2019, the restored Apollo Mission Control Center was opened for tourists.

=== Space Shuttle program ===
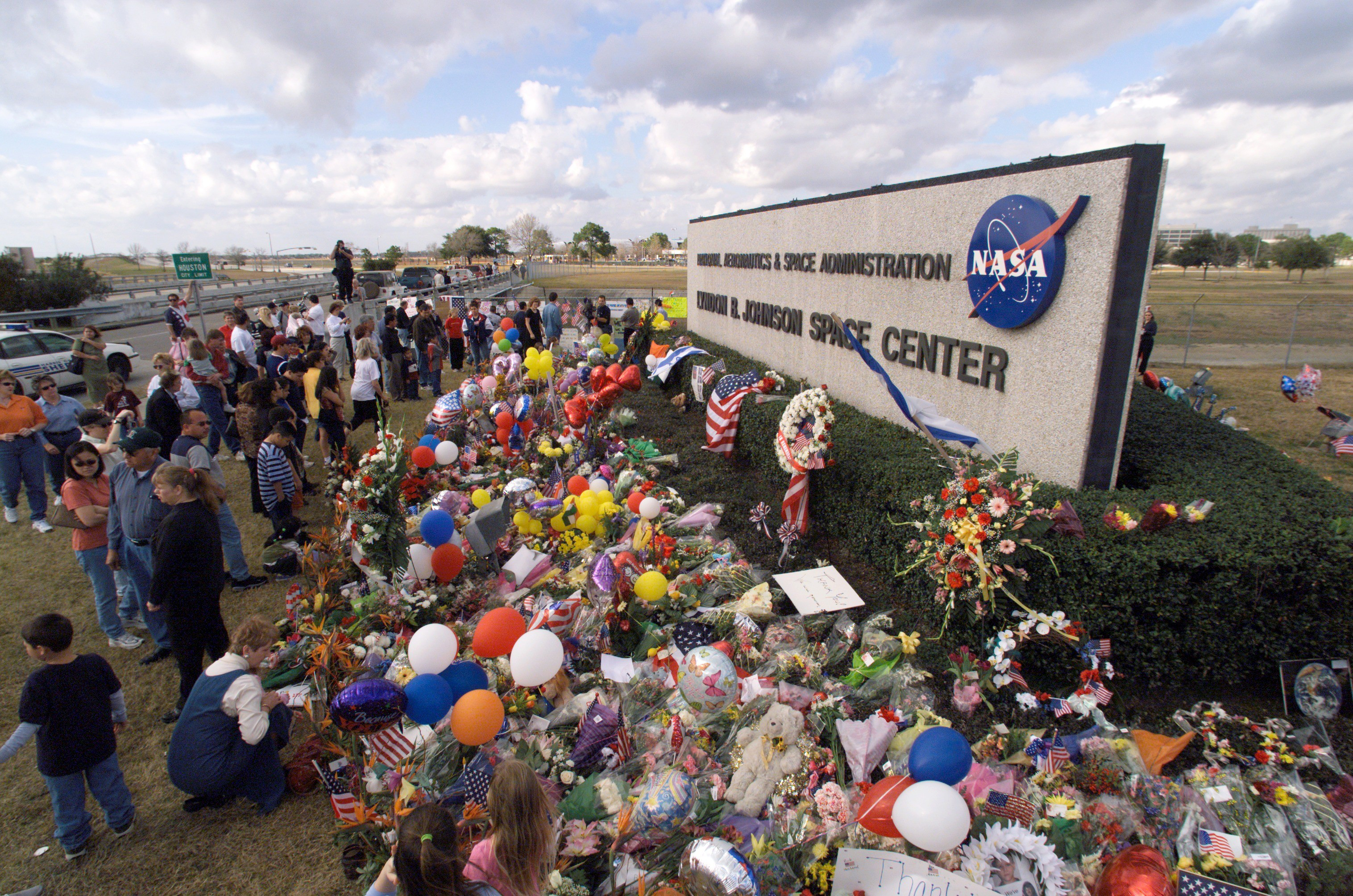
Entrance to JSC on February 1, 2003, with a makeshift memorial to the victims of the Space Shuttle Columbia disaster

In the wake of the January 28, 1986, Space Shuttle Challenger disaster, President Ronald Reagan and First Lady Nancy Reagan traveled to JSC on January 31 to speak at a memorial service honoring the astronauts. It was attended by 6,000 NASA employees and 4,000 guests, as well as by the families of the crew. During the ceremony, an Air Force band led the singing of "God Bless America" as NASA T-38 Talon supersonic jets flew directly over the scene in the traditional missing-man formation. All activities were broadcast live by the national television and radio networks.

A similar memorial service was held at the Johnson Space Center on February 4, 2003, for the astronauts who perished in the Space Shuttle Columbia disaster three days before, which was attended by President George W. Bush and First Lady Laura Bush. Although that service was broadcast live by the national television and radio networks, it was geared mainly to NASA employees and the families of the astronauts. A second service for the nation was led by Vice-president Dick Cheney and his wife Lynne at Washington National Cathedral two days later.

On September 13, 2008, Hurricane Ike hit Galveston as a category 2 hurricane and caused minor damage to the Mission Control Center and other buildings at JSC. The storm damaged the roofs of several hangars for the T-38 Talons at Ellington Field.

== Facilities ==
The Johnson Space Center is home to Christopher C. Kraft Jr. Mission Control Center (MCC-H), the NASA control center that coordinates and monitors all human spaceflight for the United States. MCC-H directed all Space Shuttle missions, and currently directs American activities aboard the International Space Station. The Apollo Mission Control Center, a National Historic Landmark, is in Building 30. From the moment a crewed spacecraft clears its launch tower until it lands back on Earth, it is in the hands of Mission Control. The MCC houses several Flight Control Rooms, from which flight controllers coordinate and monitor the spaceflights. The rooms have many computer resources to monitor, command, and communicate with spacecraft. When a mission is underway, the rooms are staffed around the clock, usually in three shifts.

JSC handles most of the planning and training of the U.S. astronaut corps and houses training facilities such as the Sonny Carter Training Facility and the Neutral Buoyancy Laboratory, a critical component in training astronauts for spacewalks. The Neutral Buoyancy Laboratory provides a controlled neutral buoyancy environment—a very large pool containing about 6.2 million U.S. gallons (23,000 m^{3}) of water where astronauts train to practice extra-vehicular activity tasks while simulating zero-g conditions. The facility provides preflight training in becoming familiar with crew activities and with the dynamics of body motion under weightless conditions.

Building 31-N houses the Lunar Sample Laboratory Facility, which stores, analyzes, and processes most of the samples returned from the Moon during the Apollo program.

The center is also responsible for direction of operations at White Sands Test Facility in New Mexico, which served as a backup Space Shuttle landing site and would have been the coordinating facility for the Constellation program, which was planned to replace the Shuttle program after 2010, but was canceled in 2009.

The visitor center has been the adjacent Space Center Houston since 1994; JSC Building 2 previously housed the visitor center.

The Johnson Space Center Heliport (FAA LID: 72TX) is located on the campus.

== Personnel and training ==
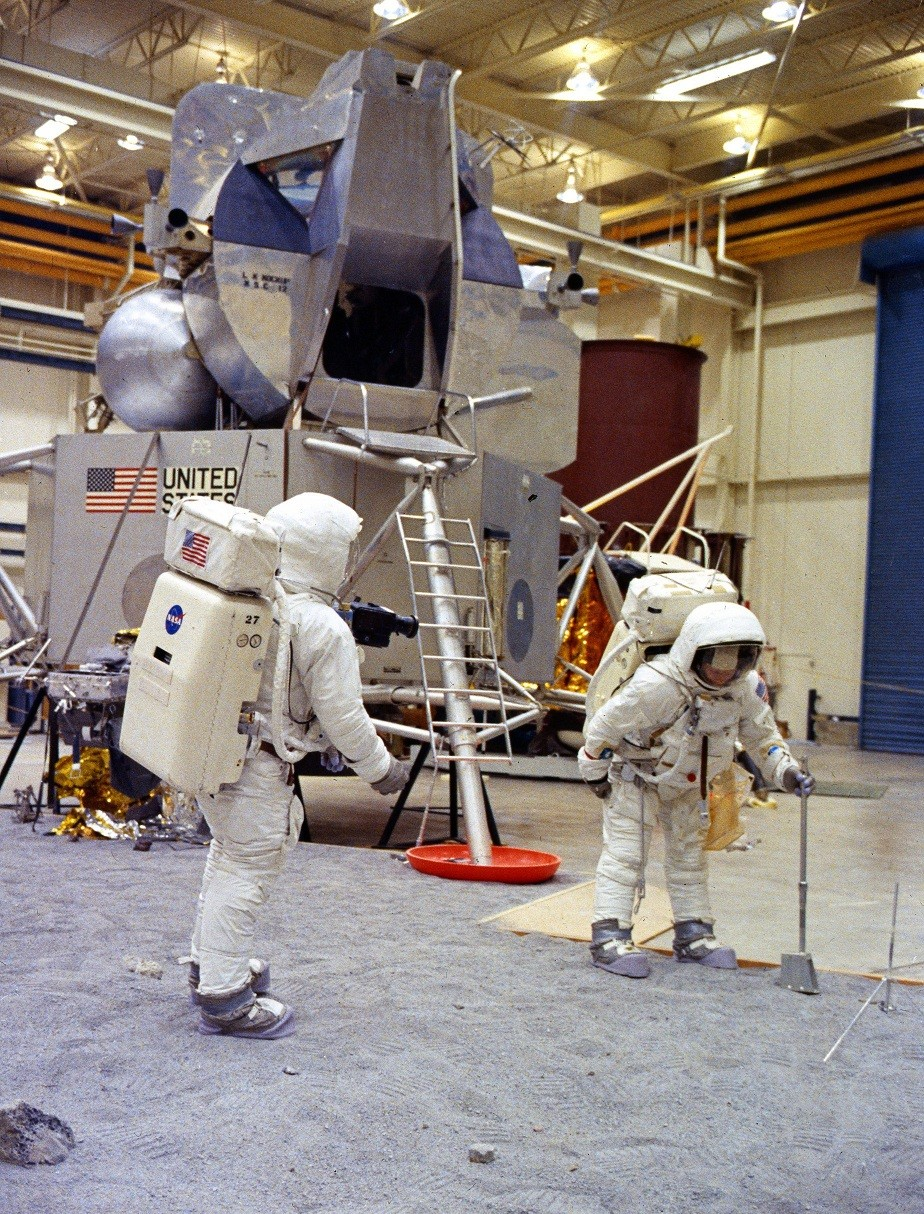
Apollo 11 astronauts Neil Armstrong (left) and Buzz Aldrin train in Building 9 on April 18, 1969.

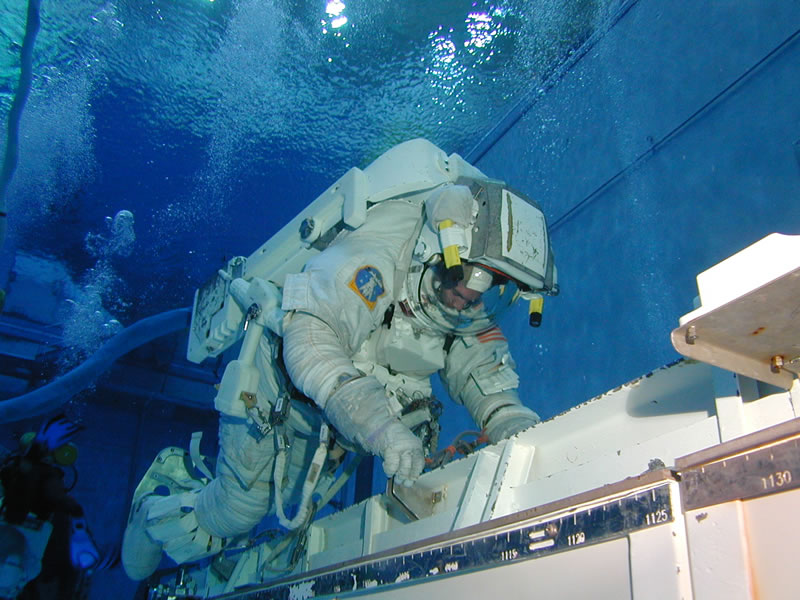
A shuttle astronaut training in the Neutral Buoyancy Laboratory

Johnson Space Center employs over 12,000 civil servants and contractors, including astronauts, scientists, engineers, and administrative staff. The bulk of the workforce had historically consisted of primarily contractors. In February 2026, NASA administrator Jared Isaacman initiated a workforce directive aimed at restoring NASA's core competencies by bringing core positions into the civil servant workforce across NASA. As a result, the number of civil servant personnel increased while the number of contractors decreased. As of October 2014, Stinger Ghaffarian Technologies took over United Space Alliance's primary contract.

NASA's astronaut training is conducted at the Johnson Space Center. Astronaut candidates receive training on spacecraft systems and in basic sciences including mathematics, guidance and navigation, oceanography, orbital dynamics, astronomy, and physics. Candidates are required to complete military water survival prior to beginning their flying instruction. Candidates are also required to become scuba-qualified for extravehicular training and are required to pass a swimming test. EVA training is conducted at the Sonny Carter Training Facility. Candidates are also trained to deal with emergencies associated with hyperbaric and hypobaric atmospheric pressures and are given exposure to the microgravity of space flight. Candidates maintain their flying proficiency by flying 15 hours per month in NASA's fleet of T-38 jets based at nearby Ellington Field.

== Research ==
Johnson Space Center leads NASA's human spaceflight-related scientific and medical research programs. Technologies developed for spaceflight are now in use in many areas of medicine, energy, transportation, agriculture, communications, and electronics.

The Astromaterials Research and Exploration Science (ARES) office performs the physical science research at the center. ARES directs and manages all functions and activities of the ARES scientists who perform basic research in earth, planetary, and space sciences. ARES scientists and engineers provide support to the human and robotic spaceflight programs. The responsibilities of ARES also include interaction with the Office of Safety and Mission Assurance and the Human Space Flight Programs.

Johnson Space Center was granted a five-year, $120-million extension of its agreement with the National Space Biomedical Research Institute at Baylor College of Medicine to study the health risks related to long-duration space flight. The extension will allow a continuation of biomedical research in support of a long-term human presence in space started by the institute and NASA's Human Research Program through 2012.

The Prebreathe Reduction Program is a research study program at the JSC that is currently being developed to improve the safety and efficiency of space walks from the International Space Station.

The Overset Grid-Flow software was developed at Johnson Space Center in collaboration with NASA Ames Research Center. The software simulates fluid flow around solid bodies using computational fluid dynamics.

The Texas Space Commission was established by Texas governor Greg Abbott on March 26, 2024, at Johnson Space Center.

== List of JSC directors ==
The following persons had served as the Johnson Space Center director:

No.	Image	Director	Term start	Term end	Refs.
1		Robert R. Gilruth	November 1, 1961	January 17, 1972	
2		Christopher C. Kraft Jr.	January 17, 1972	August 7, 1982	
3		Gerald D. Griffin	August 8, 1982	January 14, 1986	
4		Jesse W. Moore	January 23, 1986	October 2, 1986	
5		Aaron Cohen	October 12, 1986	August 20, 1993	
6		Carolyn L. Huntoon	January 6, 1994	August 4, 1995	
Acting		George W. S. Abbey	August 4, 1995	January 23, 1996	
7		George W. S. Abbey	January 23, 1996	February 23, 2001	
Acting		Roy S. Estess	February 23, 2001	March 31, 2002	
8		Jefferson D. Howell Jr.	April 1, 2002	November 23, 2005	
9		Michael L. Coats	November 23, 2005	December 31, 2012	
10		Ellen Ochoa	January 1, 2013	May 24, 2018	
11		Mark S. Geyer	May 25, 2018	May 3, 2021	
acting		Vanessa Wyche	May 4, 2021	June 29, 2021	
12		Vanessa Wyche	June 30, 2021	February 24, 2025	
acting		Stephen Koerner	February 25, 2025	September 3, 2025	
13		Vanessa Wyche	September 3, 2025	Present	

== Memorial Grove ==
Astronauts, center directors, and other NASA employees are memorialized in a Memorial Grove near the main entrance and visitor badging center (building 110). Trees dedicated to the memory of astronauts and center directors are in a round cluster closest to the entrance, other employees are memorialized behind along a road on the facility leading to the main entrance.

== Space Shuttle retirement ==
JSC put in a bid to display one of the retired Space Shuttle orbiters, but was not selected.

But there is a full size replica there today, as the space shuttle Independence is bolted atop a Boeing 747 and both are open to visitors.

== Gallery ==
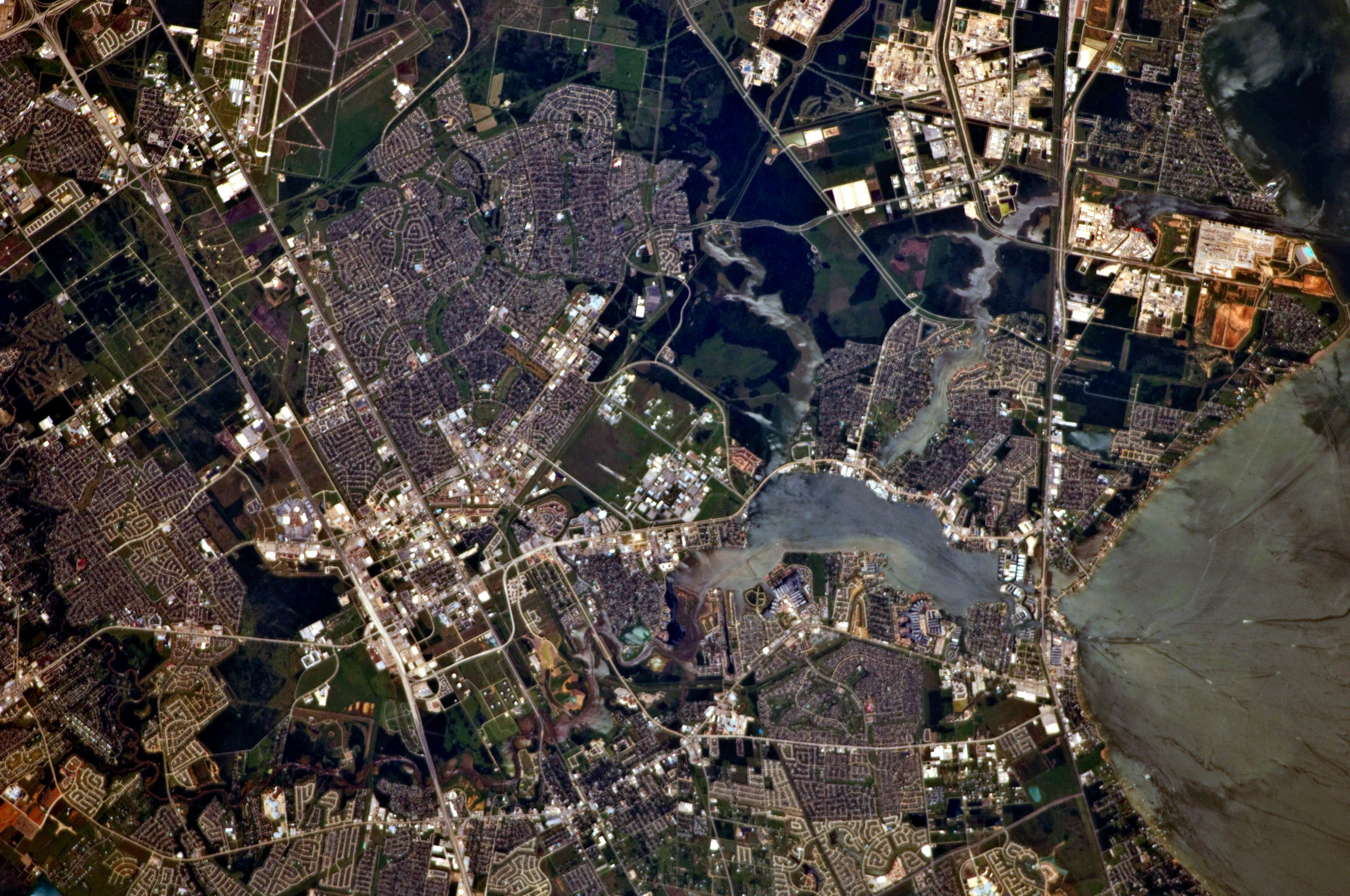
A 2010 photo of JSC from the International Space Station

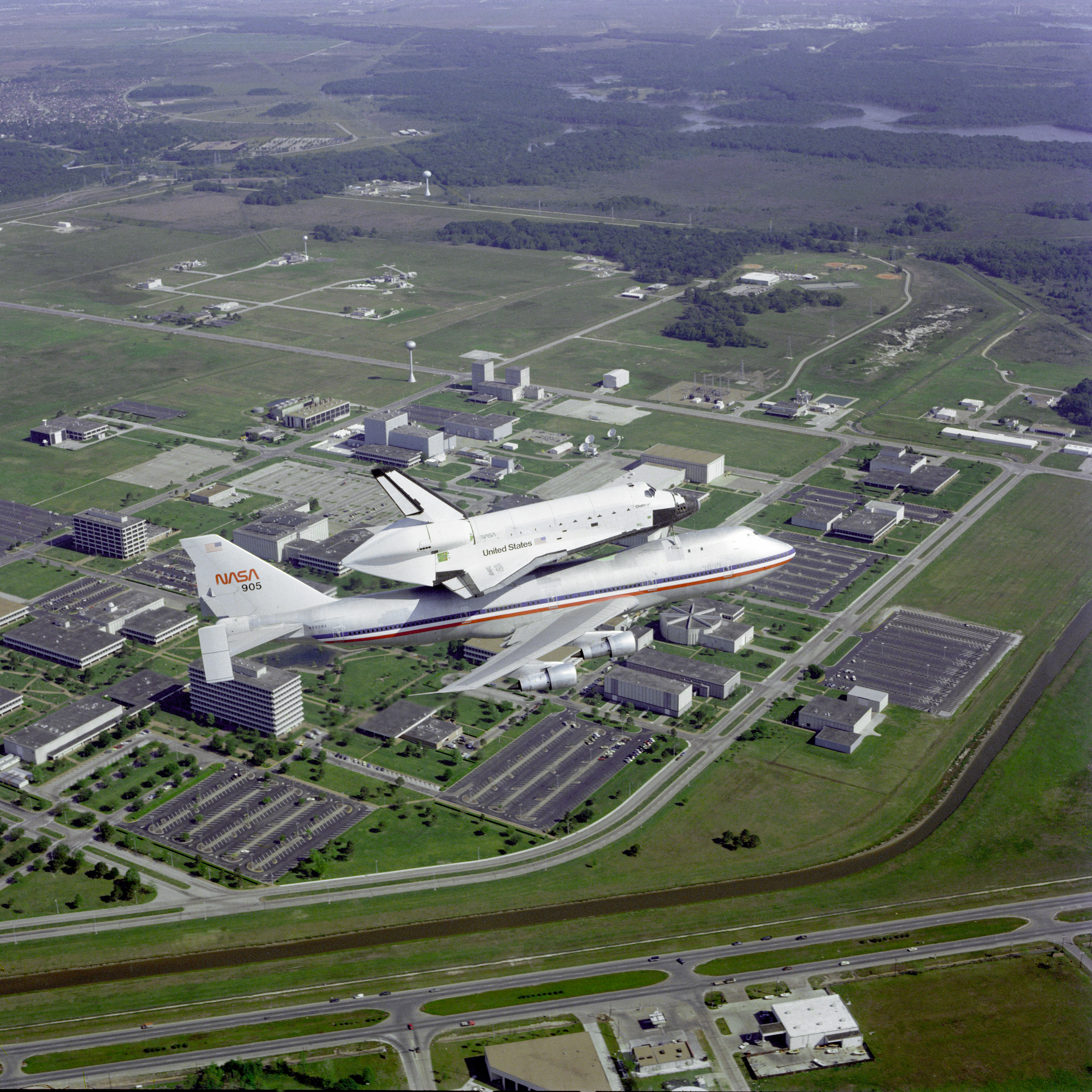
Space Shuttle Challenger atop its Shuttle Carrier Aircraft over JSC in 1983

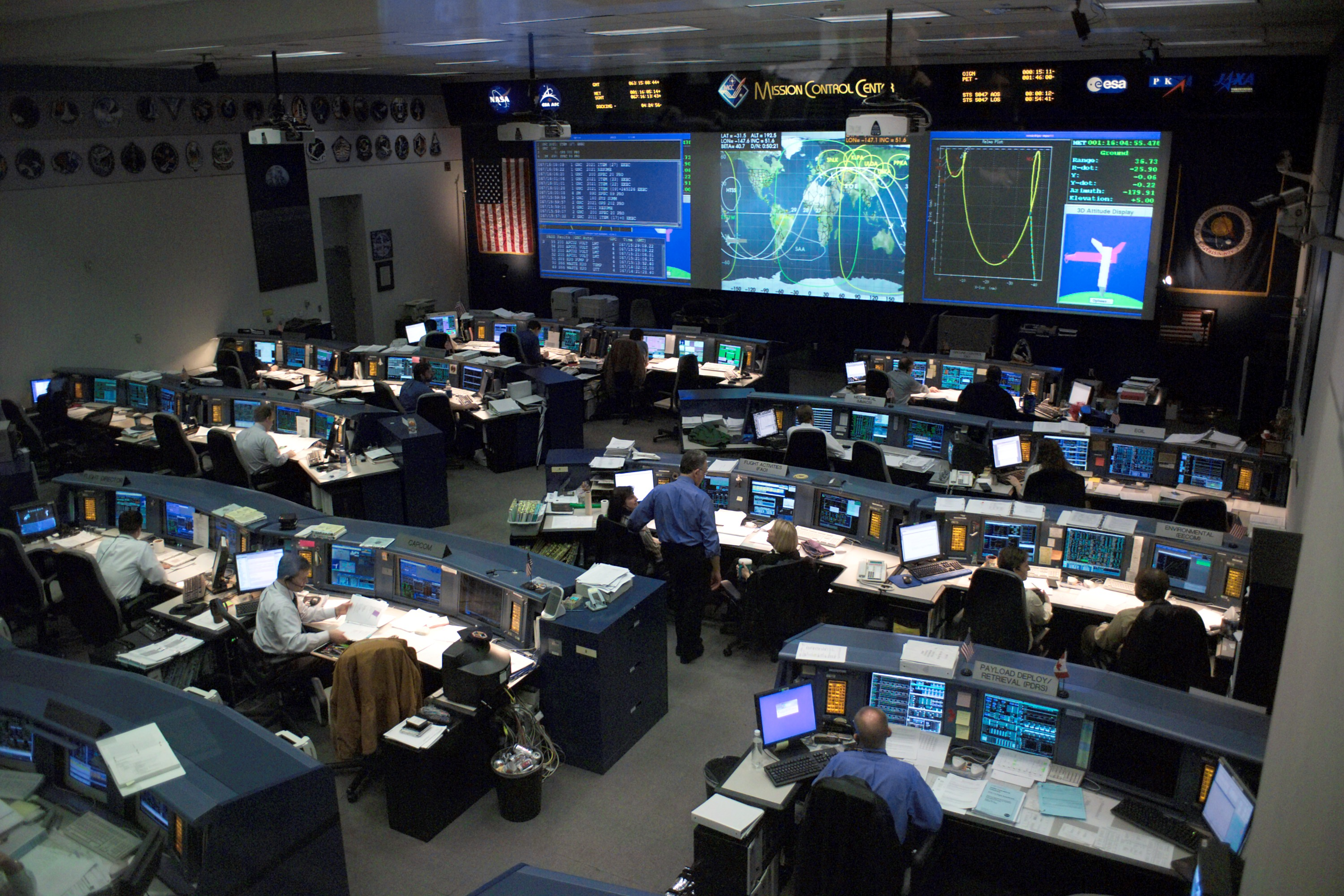
Mission Control Center in 2005

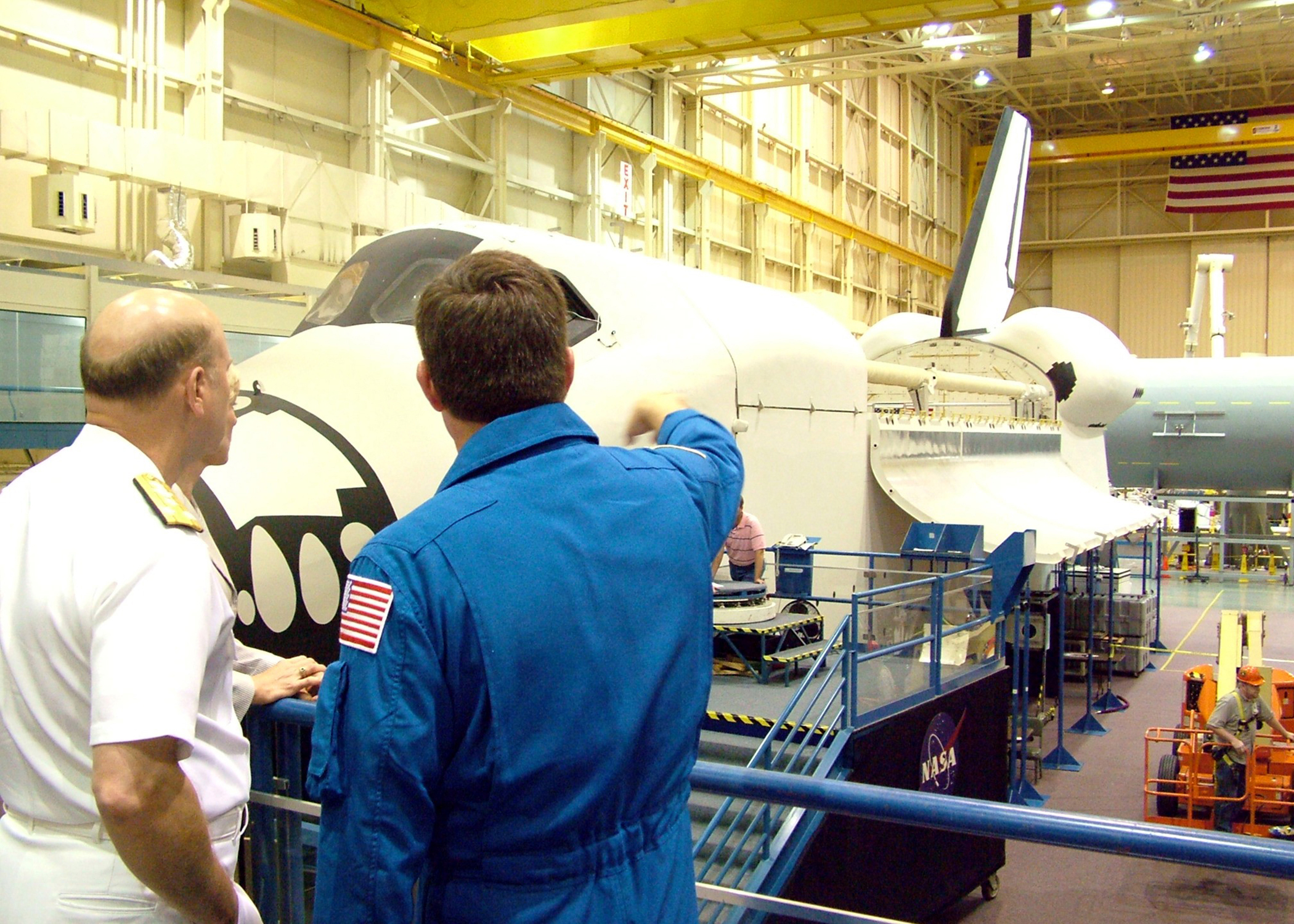
Shuttle simulator in Building 9 in 2006

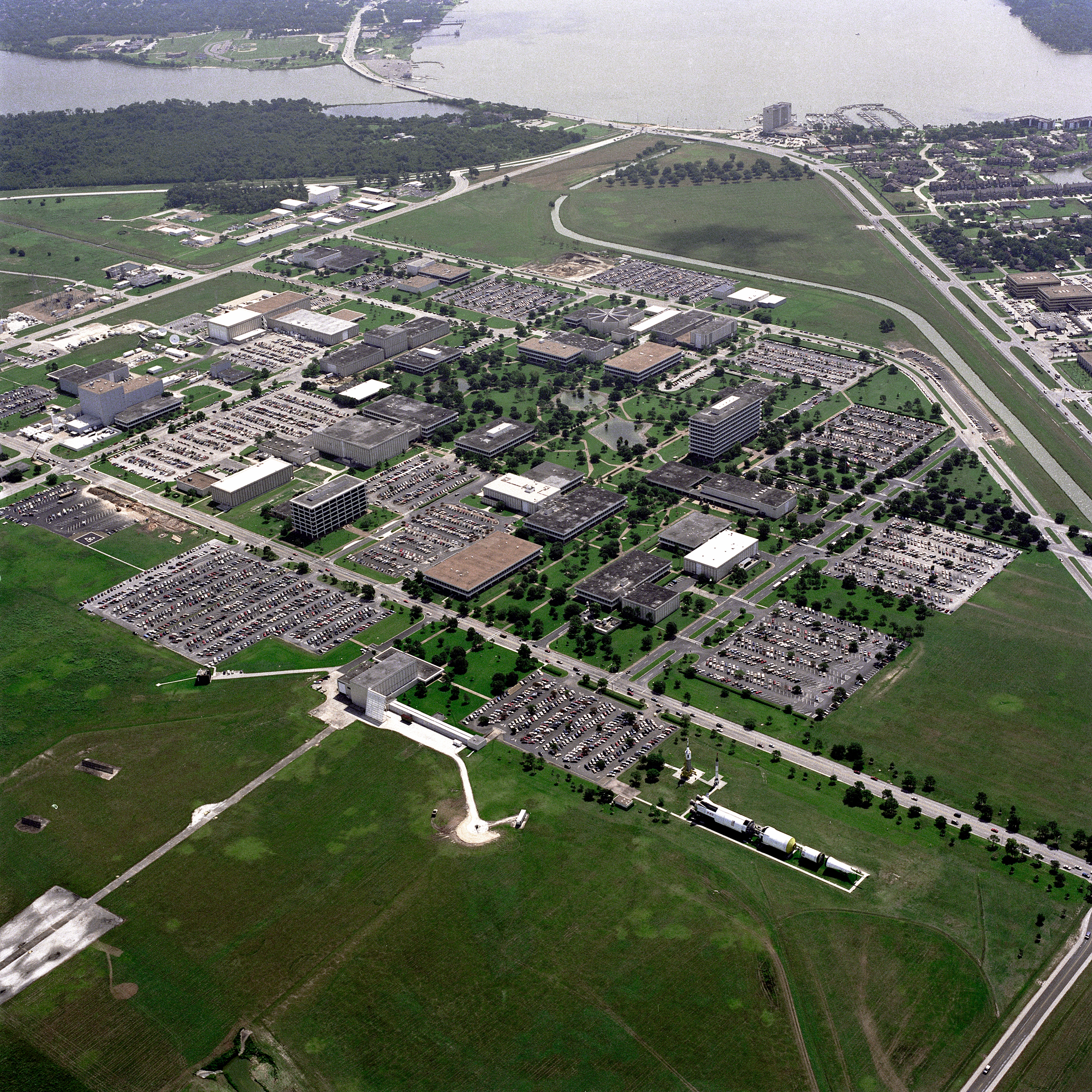
Aerial view of the complex from 2.000 feet, c 1989

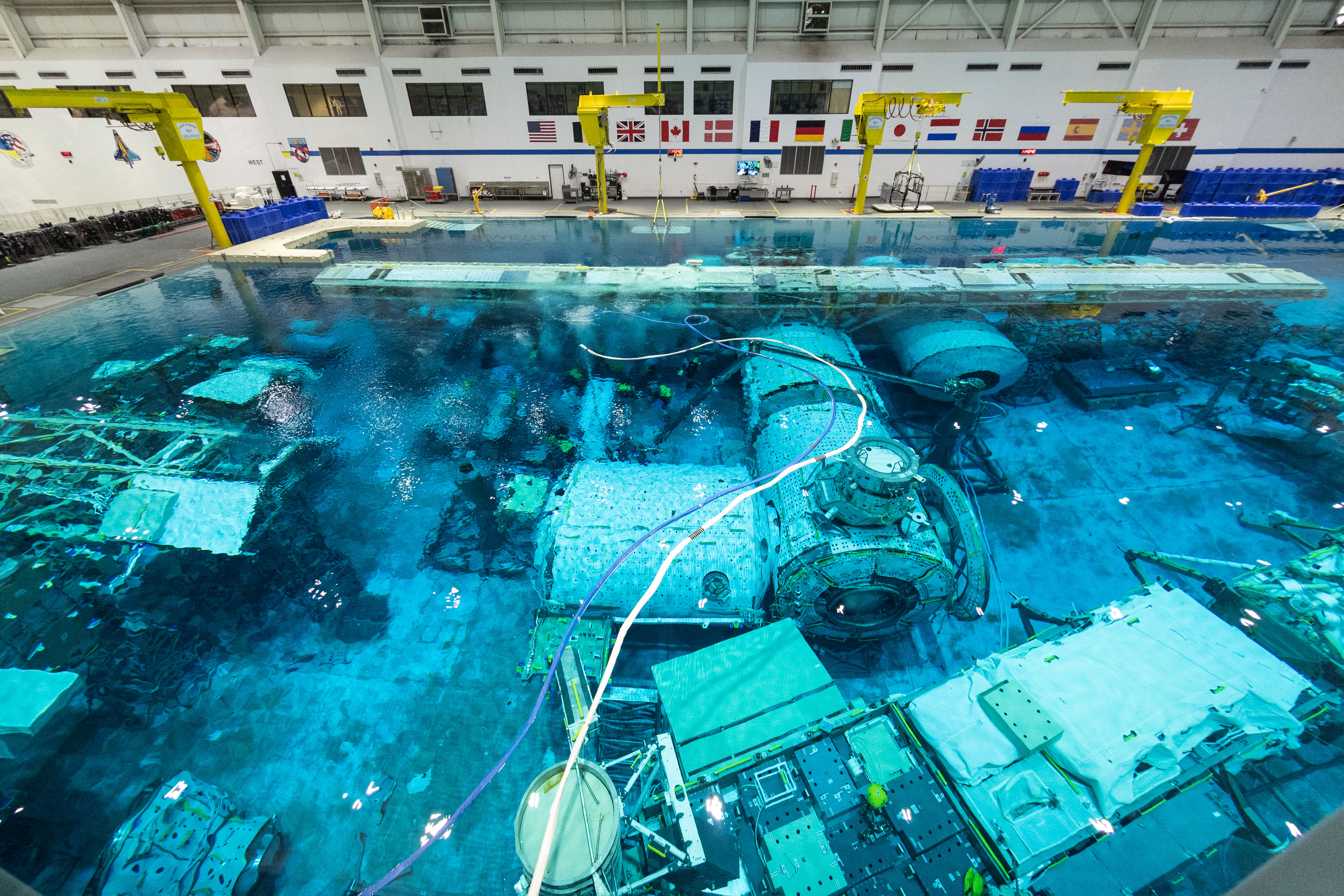
JSC Neutral Buoyancy Laboratory

== See also ==
- Johnson Space Center shooting
- European Astronaut Centre – equivalent astronaut training center in Germany
- Yuri Gagarin Cosmonaut Training Center – equivalent Cosmonaut training center in Russia
