= Rancher (disambiguation) =

Rancher may refer to:

- Someone who owns or works at a ranch
  - for a list of notable ranchers, see Category:Ranchers
  - see also Cowboy
- A Ranch-style house
- Rancher, Montana, a ghost town in the US
- Rancher Labs, a software company
- Rancher, a management platform for Kubernetes container systems

== See also ==
- Ranchero (disambiguation)
- Ranch (disambiguation)
