= Ranchero =

Ranchero is the term in Mexican Spanish for a rancher, meaning a person inhabiting or working on a ranch; historically synonymous with vaquero or cowherd.

- Charros
- Rancheros in South America
- Ranchos of California

In Castilian Spanish ranchero is a cook or a steward of a rancho or Mess hall.

Ranchero, or Rancheros, may also refer to:

== Transportation ==
- Ford Ranchero, a Ford Motor Company vehicle model, manufactured between 1957 and 1979

== Film and television ==
- The Ranchero's Revenge (1913)
- The Gay Ranchero (1948)
- Wavy Rancheros, a crocodile puppet recurring on The Late Late Show with Craig Ferguson

== Music ==
- Ranchero music
- Huevos Rancheros (band)
- Corazón Ranchero, the fourth studio album by Shaila Dúrcal

== Sports ==
- Santa Barbara Dodgers a.k.a. Santa Barbara Rancheros; former minor league baseball team in Santa Barbara, California

== Other ==
- Huevos rancheros, Mexican breakfast dish
- Rancheros visitadores, American social club

== See also ==
- RancherOS
- Rancheros Creek
- Rancheria (disambiguation)
- Rancher (disambiguation)
- Rancho (disambiguation)
