= TravelTalkRADIO =

TravelTalkRADIO is a live talk radio show created and hosted by Sandy Dhuyvetter. The show runs for two hours on Sundays from 9 to 11 a.m. Pacific Time. Dhuyvetter typically broadcasts from her studio in Encinitas, California, but often takes the show on the road. She has broadcast live from remote sites in Asia, Africa, Europe, South America and North America.

TravelTalkRADIO focuses on travel and tourism and began airing in 2001. Each week, host Dhuyvetter speaks with experts from around the world in the travel industry, as well as authors of travel books and publishers of travel magazines. The program introduces audiences to regional, national and international travel topics with the goal of facilitating "communications between tour operators, wholesales, travel agents and consumers."

Dhuyvetter is quoted as saying that TravelTalkRADIO was "one of the first Internet radio shows."

TravelTalkRADIO is affiliated with TravelTalkMEDIA, which encompasses the web, television and radio aspects of the company. The show is distributed by conventional radio stations in the United States, United Kingdom, Africa and China, including on China National Radio. Via satellite, TravelTalkRADIO is distributed in the Western Hemisphere, South America and the Pacific Rim.

TravelTalkRADIO and TravelTalkMEDIA fall under the parent company CelestiaLINK LLC.
