= Amit Kshatriya =

NASA Associate Administrator

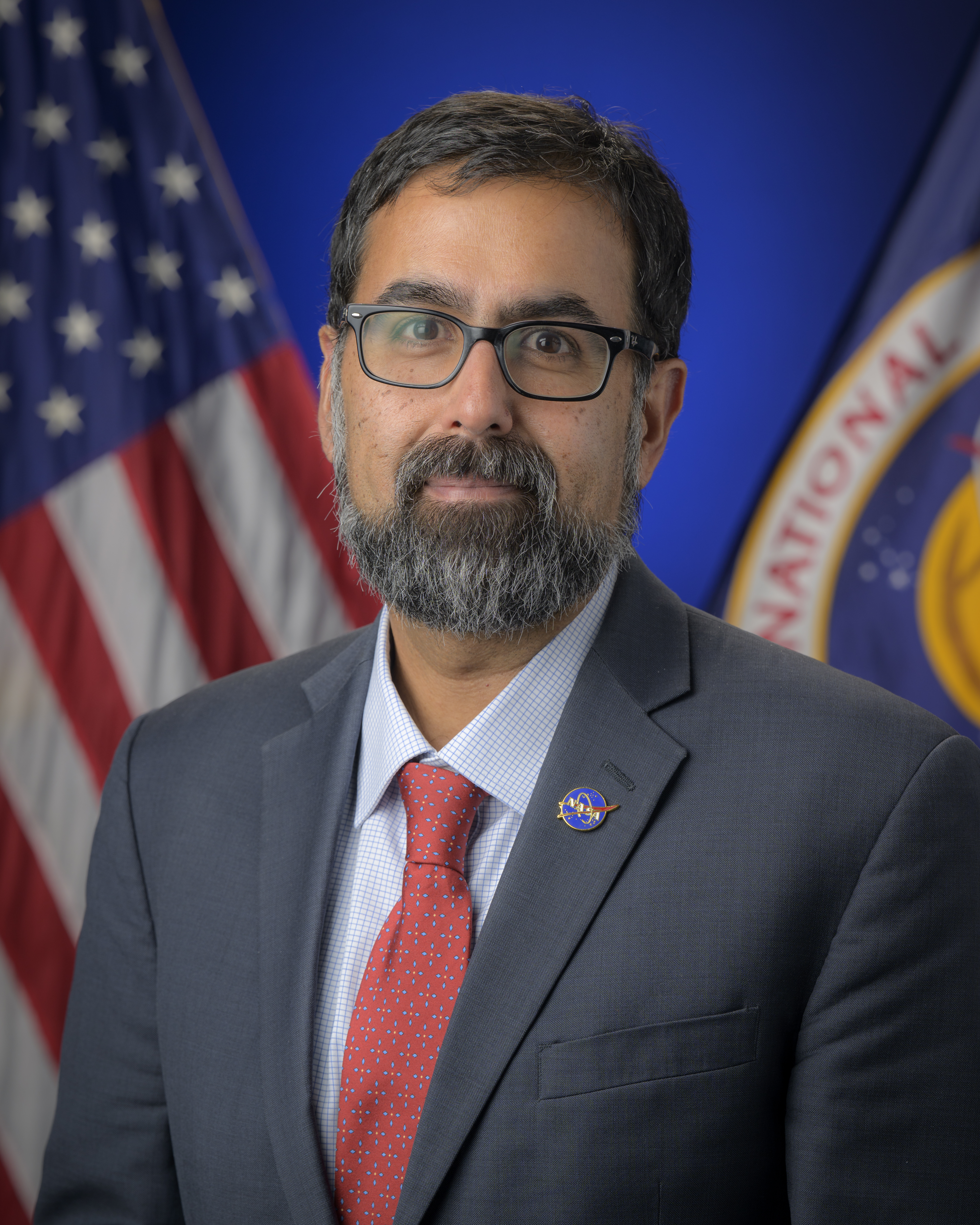
- Kshatriya in 2025

Associate Administrator of the National Aeronautics and Space Administration
- Incumbent
- Assumed office September 3, 2025
- President: Donald Trump
- Preceded by: Vanessa Wyche (acting)

Personal details
- Born: Brookfield, Wisconsin, U.S.
- Education: California Institute of Technology (BS); University of Texas at Austin (MA)
- Awards: NASA Outstanding Leadership Medal

Amit Kshatriya is the associate administrator of NASA, the agency's highest-ranking civil servant, serving as the agency's chief operating officer, chief engineer, and a senior advisor to the NASA administrator, a political appointee.

== Career ==
Kshatriya has held a number of jobs at NASA since joining the agency in 2003, including software engineer and spacecraft operator.

Kshatriya joined NASA in 2003, where he worked as a software engineer and spacecraft operator. From 2014 to 2017, he served as a flight director for the International Space Station (ISS), including as lead flight director for Expedition 50, for which he received the NASA Outstanding Leadership Medal.

He later moved to the ISS Vehicle Office, serving as deputy and acting manager. He also served as lead robotics officer for the SpaceX Dragon demonstration mission under the Commercial Orbital Transportation Services program.

In 2021, Kshatriya was assigned to the Exploration Systems Development Mission Directorate at NASA Headquarters in Washington, D.C., where he became deputy associate administrator for the Moon to Mars Program. In this role, he was responsible for program planning and implementation for human missions to the Moon and Mars.

On September 3, 2025, acting NASA administrator Sean Duffy announced Kshatriya's selection as associate administrator. The NASA associate administrator is the highest-ranking civil servant at the agency. In this role, Kshatriya oversees NASA's three mission directorates and ten field centers and serves as the agency's chief operating officer, chief engineer, and a senior advisor to the NASA administrator.

== Personal life ==
Kshatriya has a bachelor of science degree in mathematics from California Institute of Technology and a master of arts in mathematics from University of Texas at Austin. He was born in Brookfield, Wisconsin, the son of Indian immigrants to the United States. He considers Katy, Texas, to be his hometown. He and his wife have three children.
