= Rancheria (disambiguation) =

A Ranchería is a small rural settlement

Rancharia, Rancheria, Ranchería or Rancherío may also refer to:

== Communities ==
- Rancharia, a municipality in São Paulo, Brazil
- Rancheria, a locality in Canada's Yukon territory
- Colusa Rancheria, California
- Lower Rancheria, California
- Old Rancheria, California

== Other ==
- Rancharia (footballer), Brazilian soccer player André dos Santos Oliveira
- Rancheria Creek (disambiguation)
- Rancheria River (disambiguation)
- Rancherio, a poem by Luis Cluzeau Mortet

== See also ==
- List of California Rancherias
- Ranchera
- Rancherie
- Ranchero (disambiguation)
- Rancho (disambiguation)
