= Rancheria River =

Rancheria River may refer to:

- Ranchería River, a river in the department of La Guajira, Colombia
- Rancheria River (Yukon), a river in the Yukon Territory, Canada
  - Little Rancheria River, a tributary of Canada's Rancheria River

== See also ==
- Rancheria Creek (disambiguation)
- Rancheria (disambiguation)
