= Vanessa E. Wyche =

American engineer, NASA's thirteenth Director of Johnson Space Center

Vanessa Wyche
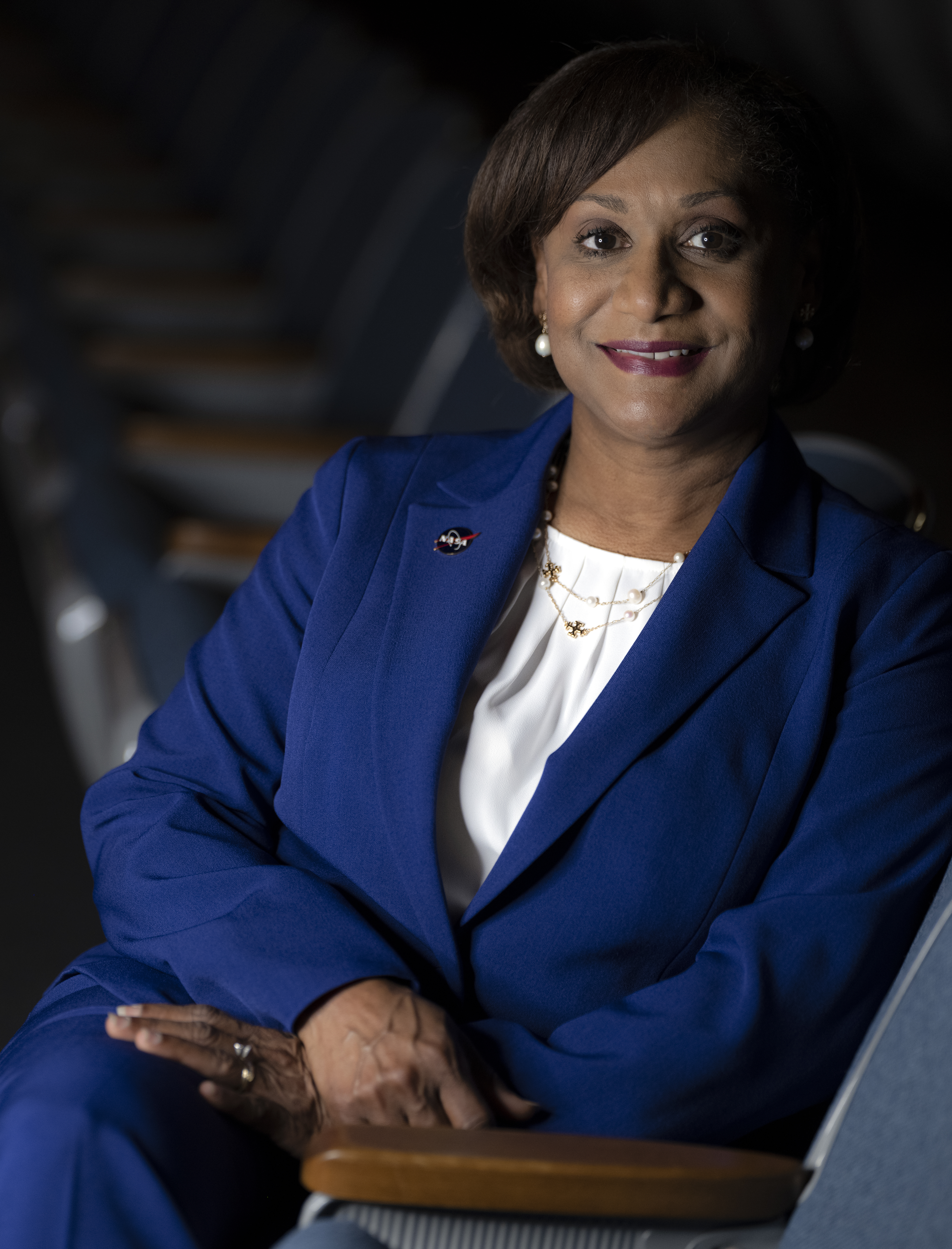
- Wyche in 2022

13th Director of the Johnson Space Center
- Incumbent
- Assumed office June 2021
- President: Joe Biden; Donald Trump
- Preceded by: Mark Geyer

Associate Administrator of the National Aeronautics and Space Administration
- Acting
- In office February 24, 2025 – September 3, 2025
- President: Donald Trump
- Preceded by: James Free
- Succeeded by: Amit Kshatriya

Personal details
- Spouse: George Wyche Jr. Esq
- Children: 1
- Education: Clemson University (BS, MS)
- Occupation: Director of NASA's Johnson Space Center
- Awards: NASA Outstanding Leadership Medal Two NASA Achievement Medals Rotary Stellar Nomination Women@NASA Awardee (2014) “Women Worth Watching” honoree (2016) Inducted into Thomas Green Clemson Academy of Engineers and Scientists at Clemson University (2019) Honorary Doctorate of Science Coastal Carolina University (2022)

Vanessa E. Wyche is an American engineer and civil servant who is currently serving as Director of NASA’s Johnson Space Center (JSC). A NASA employee for over 30 years, Wyche has also served as Deputy Director and Lead Engineer of JSC, and acting Associate Administrator of NASA.

== Early life and education ==
Wyche grew up in Conway, South Carolina. She became interested in science at an early age and had parents who supported her interests in science. When she was a junior in high school, she attended the Governor's School for top students. In 1981, she started attending Clemson University. Wyche holds a Bachelor’s of Science degree in Materials Engineering and a Master’s of Science in Bioengineering from Clemson.

== Career ==
Wyche began her career at the Food and Drug Administration. Her career with NASA began in 1989. Wyche also served as a Project Manager within the Space and Life Sciences Directorate, where she was responsible for the development and use of suites of hardware systems for medical and microgravity experiments on the space shuttle and the International Space Station. She has led a team of 400 engineers and scientists that are working on how to send human explorers to Mars. She has also worked as the director of the Exploration Integration and Science Directorate at the Johnson Space Center.

On August 8, 2018, Vanessa Wyche was selected as the Johnson Space Center Deputy Director. The Johnson Space Center is home to America's astronaut corps, Mission Control Center, International Space Station mission operations, Orion and Moon Base programs, and future space developments. Wyche is responsible for a range of human spaceflight activities, which includes development of human spacecraft, NASA astronaut selection and training, and mission control. She oversees commercialization of low-Earth orbit, and leads the Johnson Space Center's role in exploring the Moon with NASA's Artemis missions. With Wyche serving as the director for Johnson Space Center, Johnson was recognized by Forbes and Statista as the Number 1 best employer among Texas' major employers.

In February 2025, Wyche was named acting Associate Administrator of NASA, the agency's highest-ranking civil servant position. She held the role until September of the same year when Amit Kshatriya was officially selected as the Associate Administrator and Wyche returned to her official position as Director of the Johnson Space Center.

== Awards and recognition ==
Wyche has received the following awards:

- NASA Outstanding Leadership Medal
- Two NASA Achievement Medals
- Rotary Stellar Nomination
- Women@NASA Awardee (2014)
- “Women Worth Watching” honoree (2016)
- Inducted into Thomas Green Clemson Academy of Engineers and Scientists at Clemson University (2019)

== Personal life ==
Wyche is married to George Wyche Jr. Esq., has one son, and currently lives in Houston.
