= Rancheria Creek (Big Butte Creek tributary) =

Stream in Oregon

Coordinates: 42°32′19″N 122°26′41″W

Rancheria Creek is a stream in the U.S. state of Oregon. It is a tributary to South Fork Big Butte Creek.

Rancheria Creek took its name from an Indian settlement which stood near its banks.
