= Lower Rancheria, California =

Lower Rancheria
- Former settlement
- Location in California
- Coordinates: 38°26′17″N 120°49′10″W
- Country: United States
- State: California
- County: Amador
- Elevation: 1,020 ft (310 m)

Lower Rancheria is a former gold-mining camp in Amador County, California, United States. It was located on Rancheria Creek, 2 miles (3.2 km) east-southeast of Drytown, at an elevation of 1017 feet (310 m). Placer mining began at Lower Rancheria in 1848.

Prior to 1855, the camp at Lower Rancheria was mostly populated by Spanish-speaking miners. On 6 August 1855 a series of murders were carried out at the camp by a group of Mexicans, who killed five men and one woman, after which they robbed a safe. Following this, three of the Mexicans were hanged, and the Mexican population of the camp were driven away.
