= Pico Rivera, California =

City in California, United States

- City
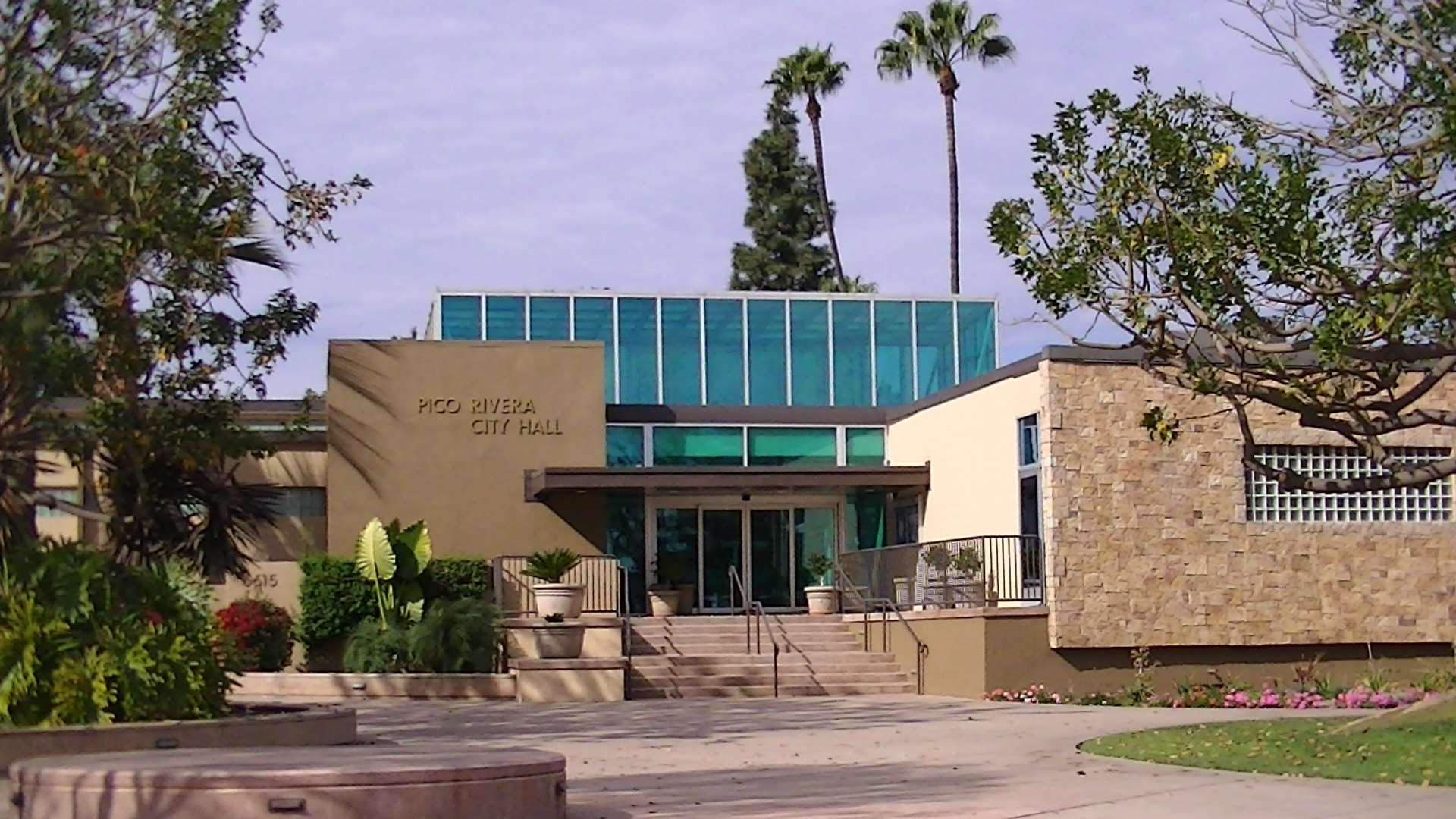
- Pico Rivera City Hall

- Flag Seal Logo
- Interactive map of Pico Rivera, California
- Location in the United States
- Coordinates: 33°59′20″N 118°5′21″W
- Country: United States
- State: California
- County: Los Angeles
- Incorporated: January 29, 1958

Government
  - Type: Council–manager
  - Mayor: John R. Garcia
  - Mayor Pro Tem: Gustavo V. Camacho
  - City Council: Andrew C. Lara; Erik Lutz; Dr. Monica Sanchez
  - City Manager: Steve Carmona

Area
  - Total: 8.88 sq mi (23.00 km^{2})
  - Land: 8.29 sq mi (21.48 km^{2})
  - Water: 0.59 sq mi (1.52 km^{2}) 6.60%
- Elevation: 160 ft (50 m)

Population (2020)
  - Total: 62,088
  - Density: 7,477.8/sq mi (2,887.18/km^{2})
- Time zone: UTC−8 (Pacific)
  - Summer (DST): UTC−7 (PDT)
- ZIP Codes: 90660–90662
- Area code: 562
- FIPS code: 06-56924
- GNIS feature ID: 1652773
- Website: www.pico-rivera.org

Pico Rivera is a city located in southeastern Los Angeles County, California, United States. As of the 2020 United States census, the city had a population of 62,088. Pico Rivera is bordered by Montebello to the west, Downey to the south, Santa Fe Springs to the southeast, and Whittier to the east.

Northrop Grumman's Advanced Systems Division developed the B-2 Spirit bomber here.

== History ==
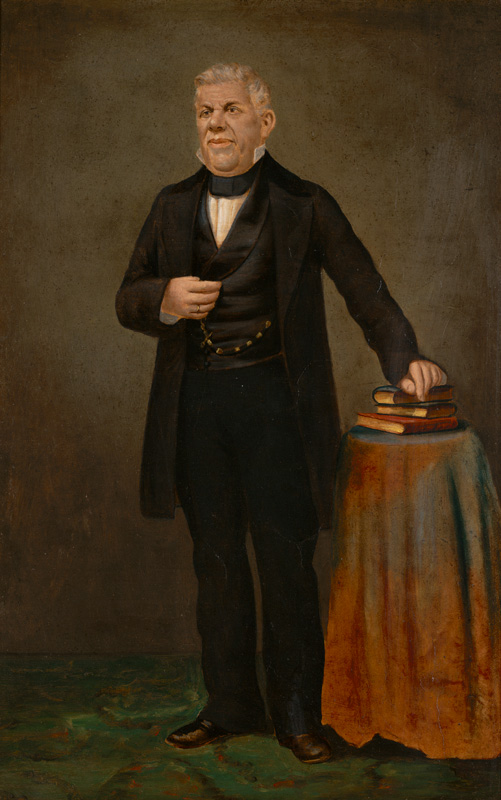
Pico Rivera is partly named for Californio statesman Pío Pico, the last governor of Alta California.

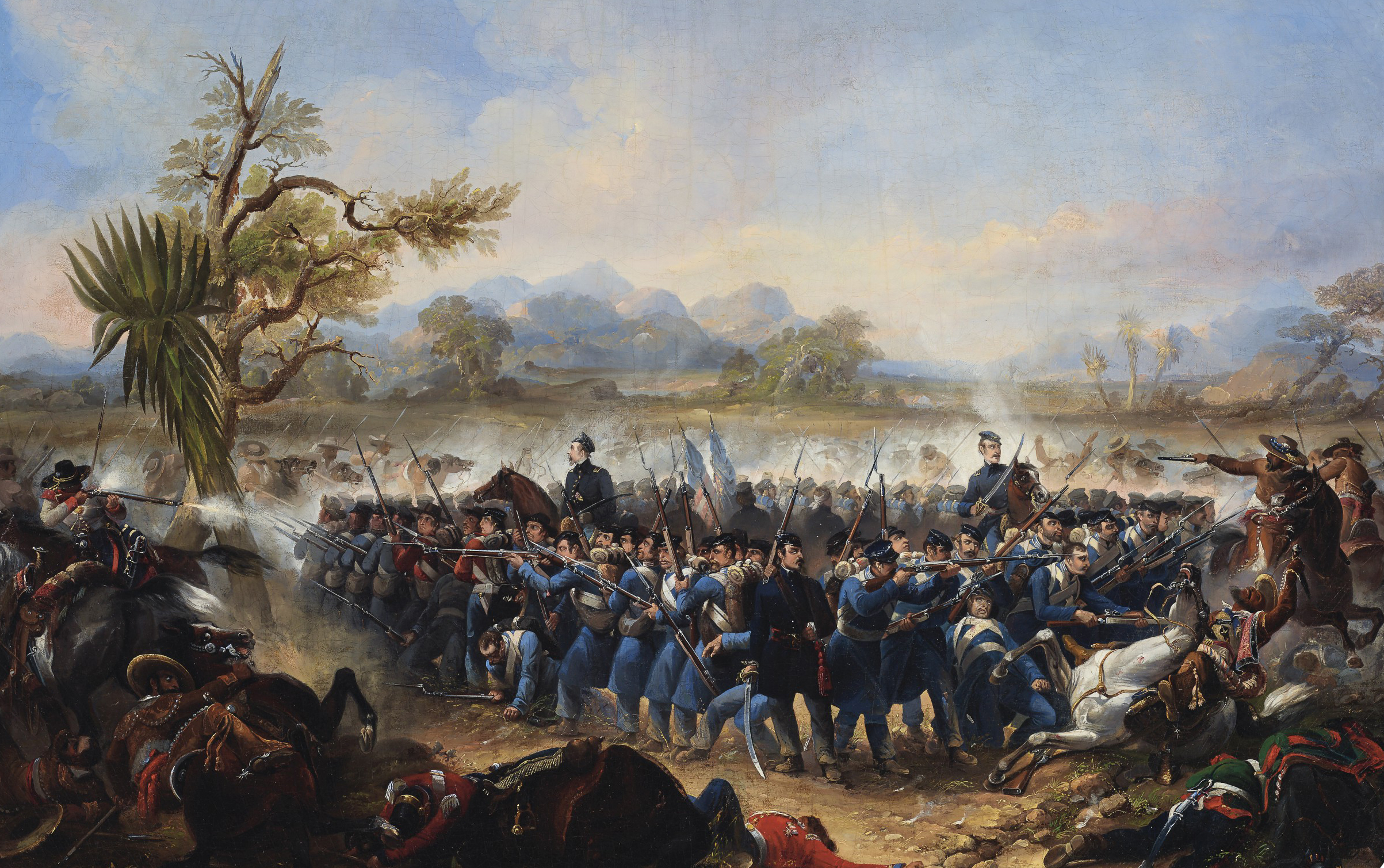
The 1847 Battle of Río San Gabriel was a decisive victory of American forces against the Californios during the U.S. conquest of California.

Situated on a rich alluvial plain between the Rio Hondo and the San Gabriel River, Pico Rivera was originally two unincorporated agricultural communities: Pico (named for Pío Pico, the last Mexican governor of California and located in the northern portion of what is now Pico Rivera) and Rivera (the Spanish word for "riverbank", located in the southern portion). By the end of the 19th century, the Atchison, Topeka and Santa Fe Railway had been built through Rivera, while the Los Angeles and Salt Lake Railroad (later the Union Pacific) had been built through Pico. In 1902, they were joined by the Pacific Electric's Whittier Line through Rivera. The Los Nietos Townsite Company was established by J. Fletcher Isbell and William T. Bone in 1887, selling land that had once been part of Pio Pico's Rancho Paso de Bartolo. One of their first sales was to Joseph Burke, whose family cultivated orchards and operated a winery near Rivera. The area was served by three schools: Ranchito (northern), Rivera (southern), and Pico (around Jimtown), all of which fed into Whittier Union High School.

The area was once predominantly agricultural, but, at the end of WWII, the fast rising demand for homes lured builders to the attractive terrain. Since the 1950s, it has been both residential as well as industrial. It had a Ford Motor Company plant for many years: Los Angeles Assembly. Pico Rivera lies below the Whittier Narrows, making it one of the "Gateway Cities".

== Geography ==
Pico Rivera is bordered by Downey on the southwest, Santa Fe Springs on the southeast, Whittier on the east, City of Industry on the northeast, Montebello on the northwest, and Commerce on the west. Rosemead/Lakewood Boulevard, CA 19 runs through the center of the city, and the San Gabriel River Freeway (I-605) runs along its southeastern edge.

According to the U.S. Census Bureau, the city has a total area of 23.003 square kilometers (8.882 sq mi), of which 21.485 square kilometers (8.295 sq mi) is land and 1.518 kilometers (0.943 mi) (6.60%) is water.

Pico Rivera was the epicenter of a magnitude 4.4 earthquake on March 16, 2010, which occurred at 4:04 a.m. Pacific Daylight Time (11:04 a.m. Greenwich Mean Time).

== Demographics ==
Historical population
Census	Pop.	Note	%±
1960	49,150		—
1970	54,170		10.2%
1980	53,387		−1.4%
1990	59,177		10.8%
2000	63,428		7.2%
2010	62,942		−0.8%
2020	62,088		−1.4%
U.S. Decennial Census; 1860–1870 1880–1890; 1900 1910 1920; 1930 1940 1950; 1960 1970 1980; 1990 2000 2010; 2020

Pico Rivera first appeared as a city in the 1960 U.S. census as part of the Whittier census county division. Prior to 1960, the area was included in the unincorporated portion of the now defunct Whittier Township (1950 pop. 68,368).

=== Racial and ethnic composition ===
Pico Rivera city, California – racial and ethnic composition Note: the US Census treats Hispanic/Latino as an ethnic category. This table excludes Latinos from the racial categories and assigns them to a separate category. Hispanics/Latinos may be of any race.
Race / ethnicity (NH = Non-Hispanic)	Pop 1980	Pop 1990	Pop 2000	Pop 2010	Pop 2020	% 1980	% 1990	% 2000	% 2010	% 2020
White alone (NH)	11,215	7,731	4,914	3,281	2,606	20.98%	13.06%	7.75%	5.21%	4.20%
Black or African American alone (NH)	109	303	313	366	383	0.20%	0.51%	0.49%	0.58%	0.62%
Native American or Alaska Native alone (NH)	177	144	193	114	130	0.33%	0.24%	0.30%	0.18%	0.21%
Asian alone (NH)	1,132	1,607	1,539	1,463	2,067	2.21%	2.72%	2.43%	2.32%	3.33%
Native Hawaiian or Pacific Islander alone (NH)	1,132	1,607	36	15	30	2.21%	2.72%	0.06%	0.02%	0.05%
Other race alone (NH)	121	155	46	50	267	0.23%	0.26%	0.07%	0.08%	0.43%
Mixed-race or multiracial (NH)	x	x	387	253	356	x	x	0.61%	0.40%	0.57%
Hispanic or Latino (any race)	40,705	49,237	56,000	57,400	56,249	76.14%	83.20%	88.29%	91.20%	90.60%
Total	52,459	59,177	63,428	62,942	62,088	100.00%	100.00%	100.00%	100.00%	100.00%

=== 2020 census ===
As of the 2020 census, Pico Rivera had a population of 62,088 and a population density of 7,467.0 inhabitants per square mile (2,883.0/km^{2}). The median age was 38.2 years. 21.3% of residents were under the age of 18 and 15.9% were 65 years of age or older. For every 100 females, there were 95.0 males, and for every 100 females age 18 and over, there were 92.1 males.

100.0% of residents lived in urban areas, and 0.0% lived in rural areas. The census also reported that 99.3% of the population lived in households, 0.1% lived in non-institutionalized group quarters, and 0.5% were institutionalized.

There were 16,958 households, of which 41.5% had children under the age of 18 living in them. Of all households, 50.6% were married-couple households, 6.7% were cohabiting couple households, 15.4% were households with a male householder and no spouse or partner present, and 27.4% were households with a female householder and no spouse or partner present. About 13.6% of all households were made up of individuals and 6.8% had someone living alone who was 65 years of age or older. The average household size was 3.64. There were 13,908 families (82.0% of all households).

There were 17,359 housing units at an average density of 2,087.7 units per square mile (806.1 units/km^{2}). Of the housing units, 97.7% were occupied and 2.3% were vacant. Of occupied units, 69.2% were owner-occupied and 30.8% were occupied by renters. The homeowner vacancy rate was 0.5% and the rental vacancy rate was 2.2%.

=== 2023 estimate ===
In 2023, the US Census Bureau estimated that the median household income was $86,956, and the per capita income was $31,277. About 8.2% of families and 9.6% of the population were below the poverty line.

=== 2010 census ===
The 2010 United States census reported that Pico Rivera had a population of 62,942. The population density was 7,086.8 inhabitants per square mile (2,736.2/km^{2}).

The racial makeup of Pico Rivera was 5.2% Non-Hispanic White, 1.0% Black or African American, 1.4% Native American, 2.6% Asian, and 0.1% Pacific Islander. Hispanic or Latino people of any race were 91.2% of the population.

The Census reported that 62,488 people (99.3% of the population) lived in households, 39 (0.1%) lived in non-institutionalized group quarters, and 415 (0.7%) were institutionalized.

There were 16,566 households, out of which 8,073 (48.7%) had children under the age of 18 living in them, 8,843 (53.4%) were opposite-sex married couples living together, 3,334 (20.1%) had a female householder with no husband present, 1,470 (8.9%) had a male householder with no wife present. There were 1,041 (6.3%) unmarried opposite-sex partnerships, and 91 (0.5%) same-sex married couples or partnerships. 2,276 households (13.7%) were made up of individuals, and 1,154 (7.0%) had someone living alone who was 65 years of age or older. The average household size was 3.77. There were 13,647 families (82.4% of all households); the average family size was 4.10.

The population was spread out, with 16,792 people (26.7%) under the age of 18, 6,971 people (11.1%) aged 18 to 24, 17,225 people (27.4%) aged 25 to 44, 14,323 people (22.8%) aged 45 to 64, and 7,631 people (12.1%) who were 65 years of age or older. The median age was 34.0 years. For every 100 females, there were 95.5 males. For every 100 females age 18 and over, there were 92.6 males.

There were 17,109 housing units at an average density of 1,926.3 units per square mile (743.7 units/km^{2}), of which 11,440 (69.1%) were owner-occupied, and 5,126 (30.9%) were occupied by renters. The homeowner vacancy rate was 1.0%; the rental vacancy rate was 4.1%. 44,643 people (70.9% of the population) lived in owner-occupied housing units and 17,845 people (28.4%) lived in rental housing units.

=== Mapping L.A. ===
According to Mapping L.A., Mexican and German were the most common ancestries cited by residents in 2000. Mexico and El Salvador were the most common foreign places of birth.

== Economy ==
The Los Angeles Assembly, a 157-acre (0.64 km^{2}) manufacturing facility at the corner of Rosemead and Washington boulevards, was owned and operated by the Ford Motor Company. The plant opened in 1958 and closed in 1980 and was purchased by Northrop Grumman in 1982 for its Advanced Systems Division. Upon the unveiling of the B-2 Spirit bomber in 1988, it was revealed that much of the development for the former black project had occurred at the site. In the early 1990s, the division was renamed the B-2 Division to reflect its most famous product. At its peak, the project employed approximately 13,000 workers in Pico Rivera. The site was closed and then demolished in 2001 partially due to air quality remediation efforts, and became a large retail center.

There has been significant redevelopment in the city: the opening of the Pico Rivera Towne Center, a 60-acre open-air shopping complex (24 ha) along Washington Boulevard, that has brought businesses into the city.

Pico Crossing is a 2.79-acre shopping center (1.13 ha) with several national retailers. Noteworthy redevelopment has taken place in recent years along historic Whittier Boulevard More developments include Pico Rivera Village Walk, a $22 million, 12-acre shopping center (4.9 ha) located at the southwest corner of Whittier and Paramount boulevards. The 8.10-acre (3.28 ha) Pico Rivera Market Place Shopping Center has opened at the corner of Washington and Rosemead Boulevards.

The city's taxes were raised from 10.25 percent to 10.75 percent in mid-2009.

Los Cerritos Community News serves the city.

=== Top employers ===
==== 2019 ====
According to the city's 2019 Comprehensive Annual Financial Report, the top employers in the city are:

#	Employer	# of employees
1	El Rancho Unified School District	1,225
2	Walmart	497
3	Target	191
4	Feit Electric Co. Inc.	189
5	Lowe's	187
6	Rivera Nursing & Convalescent	182
7	Bay Cities Container	160
8	Aurora World, Inc.	136
9	El Rancho Vista Healthcare Center	112
10	Anastasia Beverly Hills Inc.	100

==== 2009 ====
According to the city's 2009 Comprehensive Annual Financial Report, the top employers in the city were:

#	Employer	# of employees
1	El Rancho Unified School District	1,603
2	Walmart	540
3	City of Pico Rivera	331
4	BakeMark USA	259
5	Target	210
6	Bimbo Bakeries USA	185
7	Cintas	170
8	Southern California Material Handling	150
9	Lowe's	138
10	Los Angeles County Sheriff's Department	137

== Sports ==
The north side of the city is home to the Pico Rivera Sports Arena, where concerts and other events are held.

== Parks and recreation ==
There are nine parks and eight playgrounds throughout the city, including Smith Park on Rosemead Boulevard, Rivera Park on Shade Lane, Pico Park on Beverly Boulevard, Rio Vista Park, and Stream Land Park at the north end of Durfee Road. The community enjoys more than 120 acres committed to public recreational facilities.

=== Senior center ===
Pico Rivera Senior Center was opened in 2010; a federal grant secured by Pico Rivera's congressional representative, Grace Napolitano, helped fund the project.

== Government ==
In the California State Legislature, Pico Rivera is in the 30th senatorial district, represented by Democrat Bob Archuleta, and in 56th Assembly district, represented by Democrat Lisa Calderon.

In the United States House of Representatives, Pico Rivera is in California's 38th congressional district, represented by Democrat Linda Sánchez.

The Los Angeles County Sheriff's Department (LASD) operates the Pico Rivera Station in Pico Rivera.

The Los Angeles County Department of Health Services operates the Whittier Health Center in Whittier, serving Pico Rivera.

=== City council ===
As of 2023, the city council is composed of Mayor Erik Lutz, Mayor Pro Tem Andrew Lara, Councilmembers Gustavo V. Camacho, Dr. Monica Sanchez, and John Garcia. The city has a council/city manager form of government. The title of mayor is a ceremonial position that is changed each year within the council.

=== Emergency services ===
Fire protection in Pico Rivera is provided by the Los Angeles County Fire Department with ambulance transport by Care Ambulance Service. The Los Angeles County Sheriff's Department provides law enforcement.

== Education ==
The city is part of the El Rancho and Montebello Unified School Districts (K-12). Most students attend schools in the El Rancho Unified School District. El Rancho High School was built in 1952 as part of the Whittier Union High School District and unified with the elementary schools in 1962. In 1966, the El Rancho Dons won a CIF Championship in football.. Those who reside in the Montebello Gardens area are in the Montebello Unified School District.

The Armenian Mesrobian School, a K-12 Armenian private school, is also located in Pico Rivera.

== Transportation ==
Pico Rivera's main arterial roads that run from south–north include Rosemead Boulevard, Paramount Boulevard (does not connect to Montebello's Paramount Boulevard), and Passons Boulevard. The main arterial roads that run from west–east include Whittier Boulevard, Slauson Avenue, Washington Boulevard, Beverly Boulevard, and Telegraph Road. Mines Boulevard and San Gabriel River Parkway are other important arterials.

== Notable people ==
- Mack Ray Edwards, child sex abuser and serial killer
- Randy Flores, baseball player
- Jeanette Jurado, singer and member of Exposé
- Gloria Molina, politician
- Lupe Ontiveros, actress
- Cristian Roldan, soccer player
- Gregory Salcido, councilmember
- James C. Shugg, builder of Rivera School
- Jennifer Syme, actress
- Zahid Valencia, wrestler

== Sister cities ==
- San Luis Potosi (city), Mexico
- Mazatlan, Mexico
- Tlajomulco de Zúñiga, Mexico
- Chapala, Jalisco, Mexico

== See also ==
- List of Mexican-American communities
