= El Rancho High School =

Public high school in Pico Rivera, California, United States

Coordinates: 33.9838°N 118.0875°W

Location
- 6501 South Passons Boulevard; Pico Rivera, (Los Angeles County), California 90660; United States

Information
- Type: Public high school
- School district: El Rancho Unified
- Principal: Kendall Goyenaga
- Staff: 87.45 (FTE)
- Enrollment: 2,104 (2023-24)
- Student to teacher ratio: 24.06
- Colors: Blue, white and gray
- Nickname: Dons

El Rancho High School is a public high school located in the city of Pico Rivera, California, United States. It is a part of the El Rancho Unified School District.

== History ==
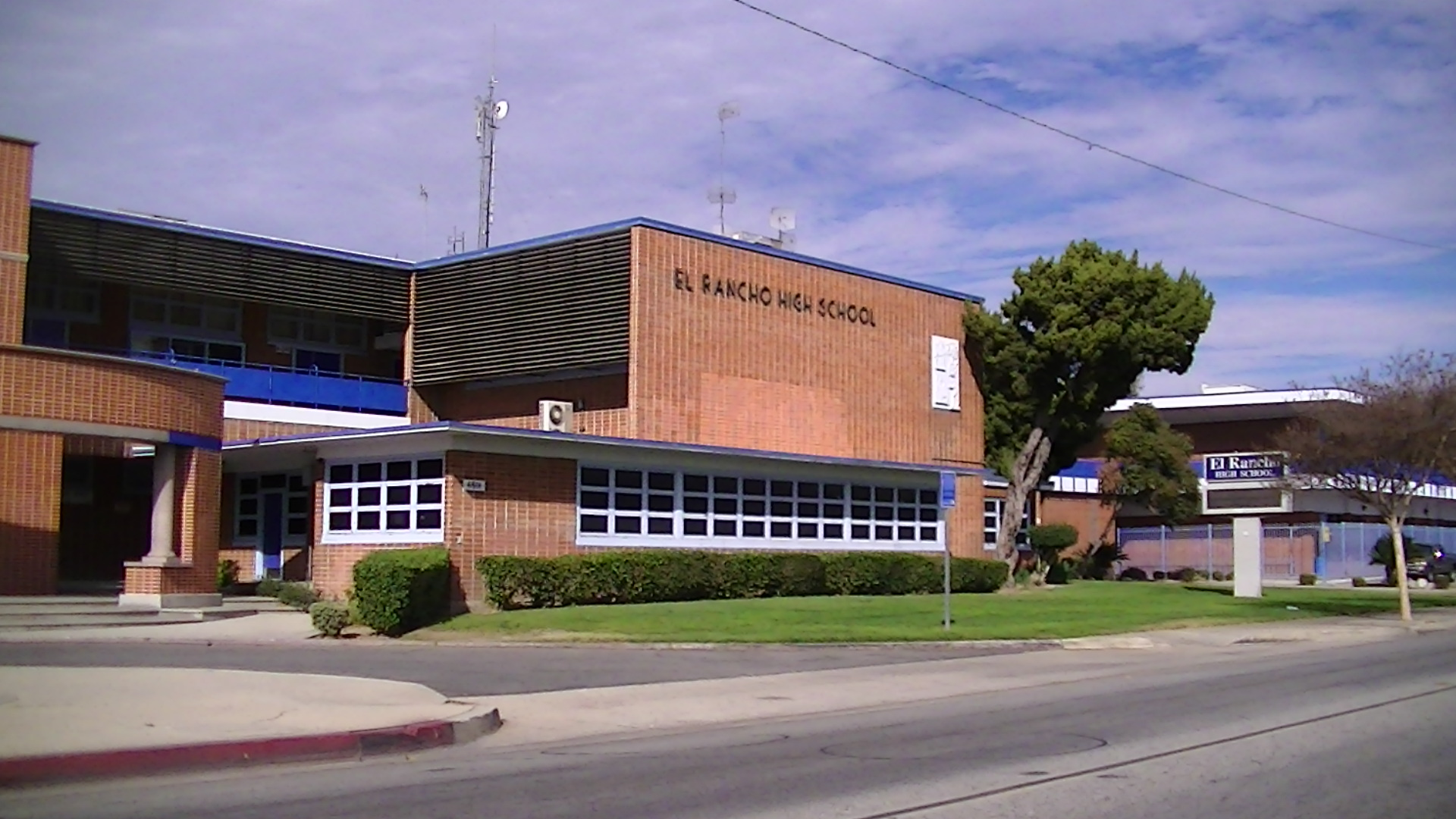
El Rancho

El Rancho High School opened its doors in September 1952. Whittier High School provided many of the original El Rancho students, and the Whittier Union District administered the new school until 1962, when the El Rancho Unified School District was developed.

The school opened before the municipal incorporation of Pico Rivera, within the unincorporated community of Rivera.

The school colors are blue and gray, representing the colors of the Union and Confederate soldiers of the American Civil War. The two neighboring communities were Pico and Rivera: in symbolic terms, the North and the South. The school brought students from the two communities together. "El Rancho" is Spanish for "The Ranch", giving the student body and community the nickname.

The land for the school was donated by the community. There were restrictions on that donation, including that all new construction would match the existing structures. After the initial construction, residents were told that if they wanted a pool on campus, the community would have to pay for it.

The football team slogan is "You haven't been hit until you've been hit by The Ranch", which became well known throughout the south-land during the El Rancho powerhouse years of the 1960s.

In 2011, the El Rancho School Board voted to name the football field at El Rancho "Don Memorial Stadium - Ernie Johnson Field" in honor of his contributions and achievements as head football coach. A banquet in the El Rancho Gymnasium attended by more than 400 past players, coaches was held on August 28, 2011. The City of Pico Rivera also declared that day "Ernie Johnson Day". Official field dedication took place on September 23, 2011, at El Rancho's homecoming football game.

El Rancho's campus was 45 acres (180,000 m^{2}) and was named for the fact that the land used to be a ranch, home to orange groves and avocados.

No seniors were present during the first year of school; the first graduating class was 1954.

Reflecting the local demographics, the school's initial student body was primarily white, non-Hispanic, but with a notable percentage of Hispanic students.

When El Rancho was in the process of opening, the students who were planning to attend the school attended assemblies to decide their mascot. The Don was adopted as the school's mascot by a vote of the students. Other mascot candidates included the Swallows, Rocketeers, and Grizzlies.

In 1990, the school was used as a location for the film Zapped Again!.

== Sports ==
=== Football ===
During the 1960s, the El Rancho High School football team established themselves as one of the most respected high school football programs in California. The Dons were led by head coach Ernie Johnson, who coached from 1956 to 1968. He ended his coaching tenure in 1968 with a 108-31-5 record.

=== Soccer ===
During the 1976–77 soccer season, El Rancho goalkeeper Duane Joel Daniel set two records in the California Interscholastic Federation-Southern Section (CIF-SS, with one also ranking in the record book of the National Federation of State High School Associations (NFHS). The first CIF-SS record was 39 saves in one game, in a 1-0 loss to Alhambra High School on February 15, 1977. Although a .975 Save Percentage (SV%,), the NFHS Record Book reflects these 39 raw saves ranking only third among all California high schools and just below the top ten nationally. The second CIF-SS record is 417 saves in one season, when El Rancho played 19 games, allowing 49 goals, with an .895 SV% for Daniel. The NFHS Record Book ranks these 417 saves first in California and fifth in the nation. As of the July 2025 CIF-SS Record Book, both are the longest-standing individual soccer records in the CIF-SS.

== Teen court ==
El Rancho's Teen Court program is a juvenile diversion and prevention program in Pico Rivera. The program serves youths throughout Los Angeles County. Students from El Rancho High School serve as jurors in the early intervention program, judging peers selected by the Los Angeles County Probation Department. The Teen Court program works in conjunction with the El Rancho Unified School District.

The presiding judges are Olivia Rosales and James Horan from the Superior Court of Los Angeles County. Blanca Pacheco esq. is the El Rancho Teen Court's court attorney, who assists the jury in understanding the charges against the defendant and proctors the jury deliberations. Raul Elias serves as the El Rancho Teen Court's judicial officer. Dr. Rebecca Marin is the court's psychologist. Elias also serves as the teen court coordinator for El Rancho High School, whose duties include overall supervision of the Teen Court Program and maintenance of a schedule for court sessions and tutorials, with assistance from Alexis Hernandez.

Court is held at the City of Pico Rivera City Hall Council Chambers.

== Notable alumni ==
=== Sports ===
- Larry Anderson, former Major League Baseball pitcher
- Rich Camarillo, NFL punter
- Tom Egan, major league catcher
- Randy Flores, director of scouting for the St. Louis Cardinals, major league left-handed relief pitcher and 2006 World Series champion
- Ron Flores, major league left-handed relief pitcher for the Oakland Athletics
- Mickey Klutts (1954– ), Major League Baseball player 1976–1983 for the New York Yankees, Oakland Athletics and Toronto Blue Jays
- Bill Nelsen, quarterback with the Pittsburgh Steelers and Cleveland Browns
- Cesar Ramos, Major League Baseball pitcher
- Scott Reid, Major League Baseball outfielder with the Philadelphia Phillies
- Alex Roldan, soccer player for Seattle Sounders FC
- Cristian Roldan, current member of Major League Soccer team Seattle Sounders FC, and 2-time MLS Cup winner (2016, 2019)

=== Arts ===
- Don Gregorio Antón, artist, educator
- Jeanette Jurado, actress, singer

=== Other ===
- Gregory Salcido, controversial former councilmember
