= El Rancho Unified School District =

School district in California, United States

Coordinates: 33.985°N 118.092°W

Address
- 9333 Loch Lomond Drive Pico Rivera, California, 90660; United States

District information
- Type: Public
- Grades: K–12
- NCES District ID: 0612180

Students and staff
- Students: 7,985
- Teachers: 340.21 (FTE)
- Staff: 415.97 (FTE)
- Student–teacher ratio: 23.47

Other information
- Website: erusd.org

The El Rancho Unified School District is located in the City of Pico Rivera, California.

== School closures ==
During the summer of 2008, the El Rancho school board voted to close four elementary schools (Pio Pico, Obregon, Selby Grove, Meller) in order to meet the new demands placed upon them by budget cuts and declining enrollment. Along with the school closures, an estimated 80 teachers lost their positions.

== Schools ==
=== Elementary schools ===
- Magee Academy of Arts and Sciences
- Durfee Elementary
- North Ranchito Elementary
- Rio Vista Elementary
- Rivera Academy
- South Ranchito DLA
- Valencia Academy of the Arts
- Birney Tech Academy

=== Middle schools ===
- North Park Academy of the Arts
- Rivera Middle

=== High schools ===
- El Rancho High School
- Ruben Salazar Continuation HS

=== Magnet schools ===
- STEAM Academy @ Burke
- Ellen Ochoa Prep Academy
