= Rio Hondo College =

Community college in Whittier, California, US

Río Hondo College
- Motto: Start Rio...Go Anywhere!
- Type: Public community college
- Established: 1963
- Endowment: $79.6 million (2011)
- President: Dr. Don Moya-Miller
- Location: Whittier, California, United States; 34°01′08″N 118°02′01″W
- Colors: Black and gold
- Nickname: Roadrunners
- Mascot: Roadrunner
- Website: www.riohondo.edu

Río Hondo College is a public community college in Whittier, California, United States. Founded in 1960, it is named after the Rio Hondo and mainly serves the cities of Whittier, Pico Rivera, Santa Fe Springs, El Monte, and South El Monte. Río Hondo College offers 30 associate degrees for transfer that guarantee transfer to California State Universities, 60 associate degrees and 127 certificates. Rio Hondo offers on-campus, online, and off-campus courses to all of its students. It is the first community college in California offering a bachelor's degree in Automotive Technology. Rio Hondo also offers a Pathway to Law School program to one of six top California law schools.

It is accredited by Accrediting Commission for Community and Junior Colleges. Aside from its academic programs, the college is also home to Rio Hondo Fire Academy, Rio Hondo Wildland Fire Academy, EMT Program, and Rio Hondo Police Academy.

== History ==
Rio Hondo College District was established in October 1960, encompassing the boundaries of Whittier Union High School District. As it expanded to include the El Rancho Unified and El Monte Union High School Districts, it established a board of trustees in April 1962. In May 1963, the board named the proposed community college Rio Hondo, named after the neighbouring Rio Hondo River.

While voters in the district approved a US$12 million to build Rio Hondo College in October 1963, classes were temporarily conducted at Sierra and El Rancho High Schools. The present campus, off Workman Mill Road, was opened for classes in Fall 1966.

== Demographics ==
Student body composition as of 2022
Race and ethnicity	Total
Hispanic	85%
White	5%
Asian	5%
Unknown	2%
Black	1%
Two or more races (Note: Other consists of Multiracial Americans & those who prefer to not say.)	1%
Foreign national	0%
Gender Distribution
Male	50%
Female	50%
Age Distribution
Under 18	8%
18–24	57%
25–64	35%

In 2017–2018, Rio Hondo College had 4,406 full-time and 15,542 part-time students, for a total enrollment of 19,948. The student-faculty ratio is 32-to-1. The largest group of students consists of 20- to 24-year-olds (30%). The second largest group (20%) were 19 or younger. The average age of students at Rio Hondo is 26. 51% of students intended to transfer.

The top feeder high schools (2005–2009) are as follows: Whittier High School, El Rancho High School, Montebello High School, California High School, Schurr High School, Santa Fe High School and Pioneer High School.

The in-state tuition and fees for 2017-2018 were $1,360, and out-of-state tuition and fees were $6,960. There is no application fee.

=== Student life ===
All full-time students (students enrolled in 12 or more units in a semester) are eligible for a free bus pass for transport with the Norwalk Transit, Metro, Foothill Transit, Sunshine Shuttle and Montebello Bus Lines. Negotiations between the Rio Hondo College Board of Trustees created this programme as early as 2006, which was proposed by Gary Mendes, Governing Board Member and followed by staff member Dr. Andy Howard. The programm was named the Rio Hondo College Bus Pass Subsidy Programm, and has since been dubbed "GO RIO" and officially began during the 2006–2007 school year. In 2012, the school also received a $500,000 federal grant to run a shuttle bus around campus.

The official student newspaper of the college is titled El Paisano.

== Academics ==
It is the first community college in California offering a bachelor's degree in Automotive Technology. Rio Hondo also offers a Pathway to Law School program to one of six top California law schools.

Popular programs include: Liberal Arts and Sciences, General Studies and Humanities, Business, Management, Marketing, and Related Support Services, and Homeland Security, Law Enforcement, Firefighting and Related Protective Services.

=== National Alternative Fuels Training Consortium ===
Rio Hondo College is a NAFTC Training Center.

== Facilities ==
In 2004, voters in the Rio Hondo College Community School District approved Measure A, which gave the school US$245 million to renovate the campus, including the construction of new buildings on campus, such as the Learning Resource Centre and Library, Student Services and Student Union and Administration of Justice Buildings (completed 2011). Construction began in 2006 and is expected to continue until 2018, as part of the master plan. Rio Hondo College has also expanded off-site, at the 297 square metres South Whittier Educational Centre and plans to construct a 404 square metres facility in El Monte.

== Notable alumni ==
- Art Acevedo – former chief of the Houston Police Department
- Luis Aguilar – soccer player
- Troy Archer – American football player
- William John Cox – public interest attorney, author and political activist.
- Evan Longoria – Major League Baseball player for the San Francisco Giants
- Gloria Molina – politician, former member of the Los Angeles County Board of Supervisors 1991–2014
- Lorna Patterson – film actress
- Lauren Tewes – film actress
- Norma Torres – member of the United States House of Representatives
