= North Whittier, California =

Unincorporated community in California, United States

- Unincorporated community
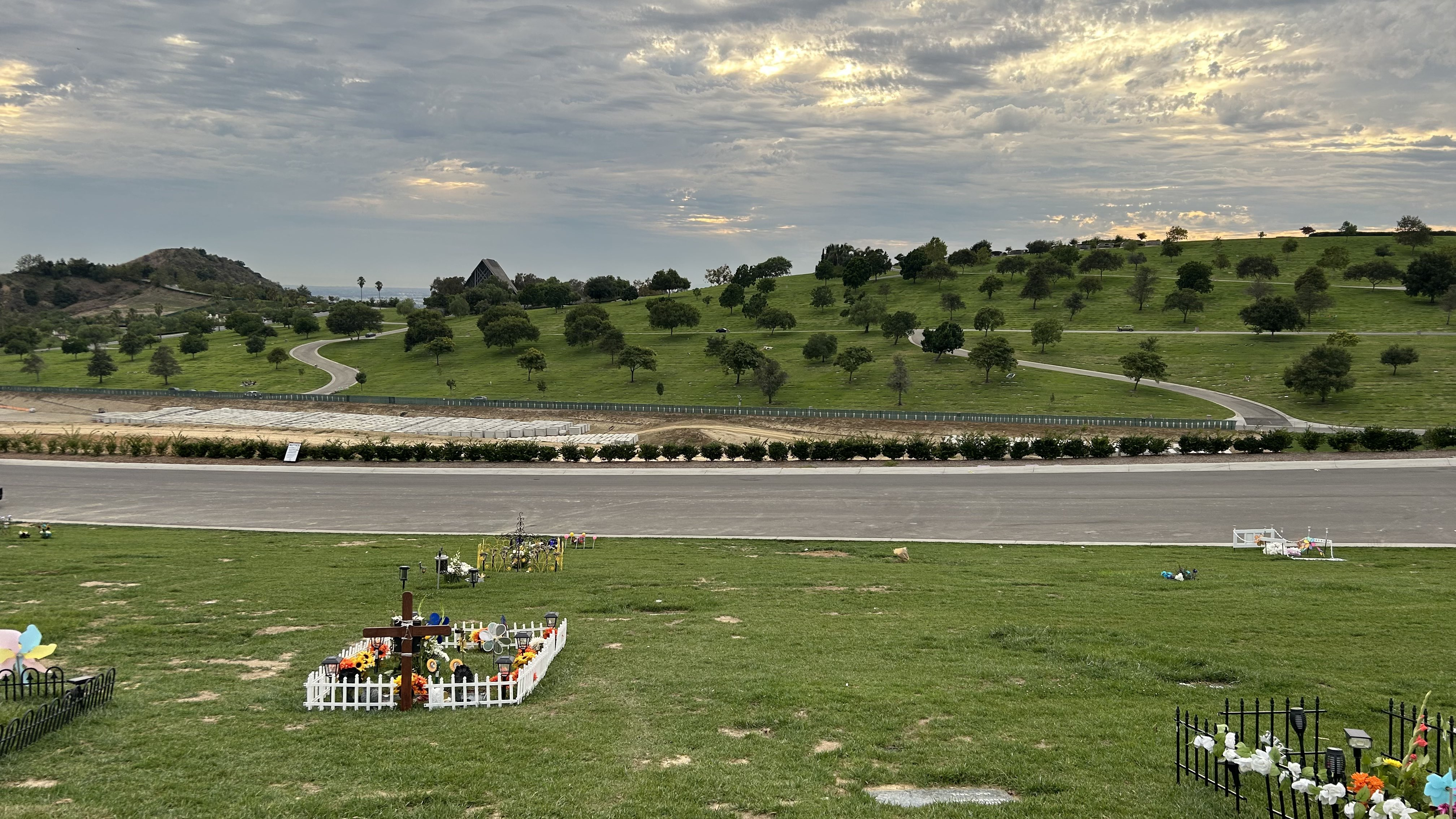
- Rose Hills Memorial Park

- Location in the United States North Whittier, California (the United States)
- Coordinates: 34°0′40″N 118°1′35″W
- Country: United States
- State: California
- County: Los Angeles

Population (2000)
  - Total: 4,351
  - Density: 797/sq mi (308/km^{2})
- Time zone: UTC-8 (PST)
  - Summer (DST): UTC-7 (PDT)
- ZIP code: 90601
- Area code: 562

North Whittier is an unincorporated community in Los Angeles County in the U.S. state of California. The population was 4,351 according to the 2000 census.

North Whittier is home to Rio Hondo College and Rose Hills Memorial Park, which claims to be the largest cemetery in North America.

== Geography ==
North Whittier has a total area of 5.46 square miles. North Whittier is located at coordinates 34°0′40″N 118°1′35″W (34.0112391, -118.026387).

== Demographics ==
=== 2000 ===
There were 4,351 people living in North Whittier, according to the US Census. The population density was 797 inhabitants per square mile. The racial makeup of the area was 57.4% Latino, 24.1% White, 15.6% Asian, 0.8% African American, and 2.1% from other races. The average household size was 3.0. The age distribution was 15.4% 10 and under, 10.8% from 11 to 18, 19.5% from 19 to 34, 25.0% from 35 to 49, 19.3% from 50 to 64, and 10.0% 65 or older. The median age was 37 years. The median household income was $93,841. (in 2008 dollars)

== Government and infrastructure ==
In the California State Legislature, North Whittier is split between the 22nd senatorial district, represented by Democrat Susan Rubio and the 32nd senatorial district, represented by Republican Kelly Seyarto, and in the 57th Assembly district, represented by Democrat Sade Elhawary. In the United States House of Representatives, it is split between California's 32nd congressional district, represented by Democrat Brad Sherman, and California's 38th congressional district, represented by Democrat Linda Sánchez.

=== Education ===
The school districts that serve North Whittier include Whittier City Elementary School District and Whittier Union High School District.

== See also ==
- Rose Hills, California
- Whittier, California
