= Rose Hills, California =

- census-designated place
- Location in Los Angeles County, California

- Position in Los Angeles County
- Coordinates: 34°00′33″N 118°02′31″W
- Country: United States
- State: California
- County: Los Angeles
- Named for: Rose Hills Memorial Park

Area
  - Total: 0.436 sq mi (1.129 km^{2})
  - Land: 0.436 sq mi (1.129 km^{2})
  - Water: 0 sq mi (0 km^{2}) 0%
- Elevation: 518 ft (158 m)

Population (2020)
  - Total: 2,927
  - Density: 6,715/sq mi (2,593/km^{2})
- Time zone: UTC-8 (Pacific (PST))
  - Summer (DST): UTC-7 (PDT)
- ZIP codes: 90601
- Area code: 562
- GNIS feature ID: 2583098

Rose Hills, in North Whittier, is a census-designated place in Los Angeles County, California, United States. Rose Hills sits at an elevation of 518 feet (158 m) above sea level. The 2020 United States census reported Rose Hills' population as 2,927.

The CDP consists primarily of the Spy Glass Hill section of unincorporated Whittier, which is wholly surrounded by its namesake, Rose Hills Memorial Park.

== Geography ==
According to the United States Census Bureau, the CDP has a total area of 0.4 square mile (1.1 km^{2}), all land.

== Demographics ==
Historical population
Census	Pop.	Note	%±
2010	2,803		—
2020	2,927		4.4%
U.S. Decennial Census; 2000 2010; 2020

Rose Hills first appeared as a census designated place in the 2010 U.S. census.

=== Racial and ethnic composition ===
Rose Hills CDP, California – Racial and ethnic composition Note: the US Census treats Hispanic/Latino as an ethnic category. This table excludes Latinos from the racial categories and assigns them to a separate category. Hispanics/Latinos may be of any race.
Race / Ethnicity (NH = Non-Hispanic)	Pop 2010	Pop 2020	% 2010	% 2020
White alone (NH)	631	614	22.51%	20.98%
Black or African American alone (NH)	49	58	1.75%	1.98%
Native American or Alaska Native alone (NH)	0	8	0.00%	0.27%
Asian alone (NH)	423	371	15.09%	12.68%
Native Hawaiian or Pacific Islander alone (NH)	1	2	0.04%	0.07%
Other race alone (NH)	2	7	0.07%	0.24%
Mixed race or Multiracial (NH)	50	66	1.78%	2.25%
Hispanic or Latino (any race)	1,647	1,801	58.76%	61.53%
Total	2,803	2,927	100.00%	100.00%

=== 2020 census ===
As of the 2020 census, Rose Hills had a population of 2,927. The population density was 6,713.3 inhabitants per square mile (2,592.0/km^{2}). The median age was 45.7 years, and 100.0% of residents lived in urban areas.

The whole population lived in households. There were 1,124 households, out of which 26.5% included children under the age of 18, 53.7% were married-couple households, 5.6% were cohabiting couple households, 28.8% had a female householder with no partner present, and 11.8% had a male householder with no partner present. 23.0% of households were one person, and 10.6% were one person aged 65 or older. The average household size was 2.6. There were 830 families (73.8% of all households).

The age distribution was 16.0% under the age of 18, 7.1% aged 18 to 24, 25.4% aged 25 to 44, 27.3% aged 45 to 64, and 24.3% who were 65 years of age or older. For every 100 females, there were 93.2 males, and for every 100 females age 18 and over there were 91.7 males age 18 and over.

There were 1,135 housing units at an average density of 2,603.2 units per square mile (1,005.1 units/km^{2}), of which 1,124 (99.0%) were occupied. Of these, 87.7% were owner-occupied, and 12.3% were occupied by renters. The homeowner vacancy rate was 0.2% and the rental vacancy rate was 0.0%.

=== Income and poverty ===
In 2023, the US Census Bureau estimated that the median household income was $123,220, and the per capita income was $60,820. About 2.3% of families and 4.5% of the population were below the poverty line.

=== 2010 census ===
At the 2010 census Rose Hills had a population of 2,803. The population density was 6,386.4 inhabitants per square mile (2,465.8/km^{2}). The racial makeup of Rose Hills was 1,573 (56.1%) White (22.5% Non-Hispanic White), 54 (1.9%) African American, 9 (0.3%) Native American, 440 (15.7%) Asian, 1 (0.0%) Pacific Islander, 471 (16.8%) from other races, and 255 (9.1%) from two or more races. Hispanic or Latino of any race were 1,647 persons (58.8%).

The whole population lived in households, no one lived in non-institutionalized group quarters and no one was institutionalized.

There were 1,016 households, 308 (30.3%) had children under the age of 18 living in them, 585 (57.6%) were opposite-sex married couples living together, 120 (11.8%) had a female householder with no husband present, 48 (4.7%) had a male householder with no wife present. There were 38 (3.7%) unmarried opposite-sex partnerships, and 3 (0.3%) same-sex married couples or partnerships. 226 households (22.2%) were one person and 44 (4.3%) had someone living alone who was 65 or older. The average household size was 2.76. There were 753 families (74.1% of households); the average family size was 3.22.

The age distribution was 540 people (19.3%) under the age of 18, 217 people (7.7%) aged 18 to 24, 761 people (27.1%) aged 25 to 44, 908 people (32.4%) aged 45 to 64, and 377 people (13.4%) who were 65 or older. The median age was 41.7 years. For every 100 females, there were 92.5 males. For every 100 females age 18 and over, there were 89.7 males.

There were 1,051 housing units at an average density of 2,394.6 per square mile, of the occupied units 895 (88.1%) were owner-occupied and 121 (11.9%) were rented. The homeowner vacancy rate was 1.1%; the rental vacancy rate was 5.5%. 2,465 people (87.9% of the population) lived in owner-occupied housing units and 338 people (12.1%) lived in rental housing units.

According to the 2010 United States Census, Rose Hills had a median household income of $92,708, with 8.9% of the population living below the federal poverty line.

== Education ==
Rose Hills is served by the Whittier City School District for elementary and junior high students and the Whittier Union High School District for high school students. Rio Hondo College is also located in this CDP.
