= Little Lake City School District teachers' strike =

2026 labor dispute in California, United States

Little Lake City School District Teachers' Strike
- Little Lake School District Teachers' Strike
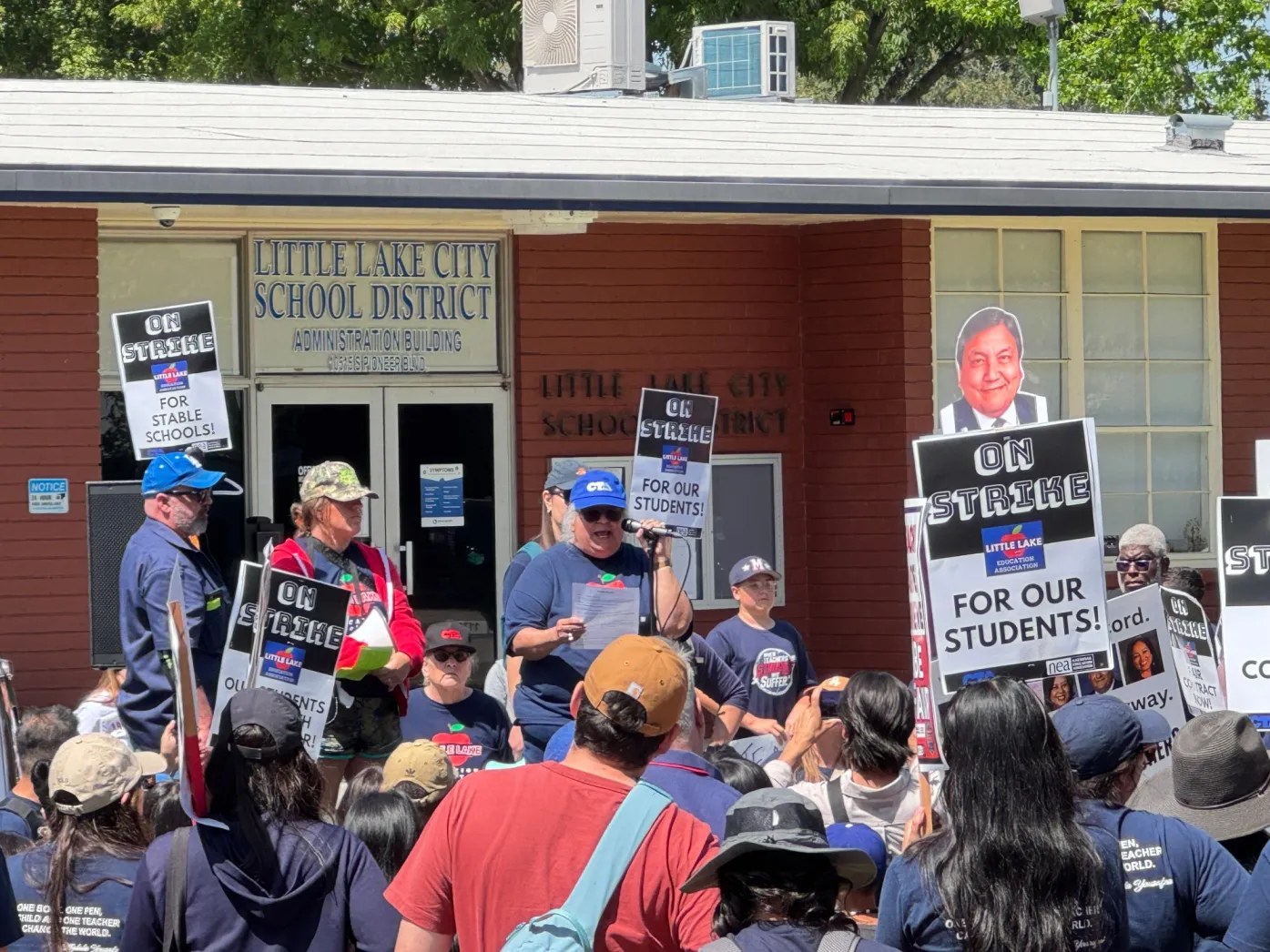
- Educators striking at the school district headquarters
- Date: April 16, 2026-April 30 2026 (2 Weeks)
- Location: Santa Fe Springs, Norwalk and parts of Downey; 33.9162 N, -118.0602 W
- Caused by: Stalled negoations with Little Lake City School District
- Goals: restored health care benefits, reduced class sizes, and increased special education support
- Methods: picketing at all nine school sites and mass rallies at the Little Lake City School District offices
- Result: Little Lake teachers end the strike with a tentative contract agreement

Parties
Little Lake Education Association	Little Lake City School District

Lead figures
Maria Pilios	Jonathan Vasquez(16 April- 27 April) Monica Martinez-Johnson(27 April-Present)

Number
200+	5+

Educators in Little Lake City School District, Los Angeles County, California, U.S. began a strike on April 16, 2026, following stalled negotiations with school district authorities.

== Events ==
Prior to the strike, educators had entered negotiations with the school district starting 15 September regarding lower healthcare costs, smaller class sizes, and support for special education.

More than 200 educators joined the strike on its first day, April 16, 2026.

Since April 16 all 9 Schools (7 Elementary and 2 Middle) went on a minimum day schedule resulting from the strike, the students get off at 1:30pm. Daycare(6:30-8:30am) and After school(1:30-6:00pm) programs are still open with staff adjustment for the safety of the students

As the strike reaches day 4(April 20th) the district can no longer afford to fully fund employee health care benefits because of declining enrollment, which has depleted its reserves.

On day 7 of the Strike Jonathan Vasquez announces his retirement and that goes on effect on 27 of April 2026 for heath reasons, also he claims that the Teachers and District are closer to a deal

On day 11 of the strike(27 April) the new superintendent, Monica Martinez-Johnson steps up which causes Negoations restart again on 27 of April

According to the District, Following today's(27 April) negotiations, District representatives were blocked from safely exiting the property by some union members and individuals not authorized to be on site. Individuals were observed scaling the perimeter gate to gain unauthorized entry to the parking lot, and demonstrators blocked driveways, preventing unarmed public safety officers from accessing the premises. Law enforcement was subsequently called to the scene to safely escort District personnel and to remove unauthorized parties. These actions are unacceptable, Because of these safety concerns, Tuesday's(28 April) 9:00 a.m. negotiations will not move forward until a security plan is implemented. Tonight's scheduled Board meeting has also been postponed to a future date

As of 30 April, the Teachers and the District have came into a tentative contract agreement which results the strike with a stalemate as of now, unless the strike goes on again.

The strike has been the third longest in California since 1996 and the resignment of super intendent Jonathan Vasquez.
