= Little Lake, California =

Little Lake, California may refer to:

- Little Lake, Inyo County, California
- Little Lake, Los Angeles County, California
  - Little Lake City School District
- Little Lake, California, former name of Willits, California
