= Little Lake City School District =

School district in California

Coordinates: 33.938379°N 118.082194°W

The Little Lake City School District is a K–8 public public school district in Los Angeles County, California, with seven elementary schools and two middle schools. As of 2025, district enrollment was 3,656. The district superintendent is Jonathan Vasquez, since 2023.

The district serves portions of Santa Fe Springs, Downey, and Norwalk. Its offices are on Pioneer Boulevard in Santa Fe Springs.

== History ==
Little Lake School District is named for Little Lake (La Laguna Chiquita on an 1862 map of Los Nietos), built over in the 20th century. The first one-room school was opened in 1873, although a lease with the Los Angeles Pioneer Oil Co. for exploratory drilling is dated 1865. After the bridge across the lake washed out, the schoolhouse was replaced in 1882 with a two-room building farther from the lake, on Little Lake Road (now Florence Avenue in Santa Fe Springs). A bell turret was added in 1889. In 1919 this school was replaced by an H-shaped concrete building with a tile roof, to which an auditorium in Spanish style was added in 1933. The old building was auctioned for $800; the bell was retained by the school district. The 1933 Long Beach earthquake damaged the school building; classes were held in tents for two years while it was repaired. The auditorium was demolished in 1983 despite preservation efforts.

In the 1870s, the district consisted of ten settlers and their families; the population was 970 in 1920, and more than 50,000 by 1953. In 1923 and 1924, the district still consisted of a single school, with a principal and four teachers. Enrollment grew rapidly after World War II, increasing to 210 in 1949 when kindergarten was offered for the first time, doubling by the following year, and increasing from 2,300 to 4,938 in 1952–53. Lakeview School was opened as the district's third school in 1952 with double sessions. Prior to the incorporation of Santa Fe Springs in 1957, residents advocated for its boundaries to correspond to those of the school district.

After three of its nine schools were placed under state sanctions in 2001 for poor academic performance, the district instituted a coordinated system of standards-based instruction in those schools, extending the program in 2003–08 to its other six schools. In 2014 local control of the district was reinstated, and it has since won awards including the naming of all the schools to the Educational Results Partnership Honor Roll in 2021.

== Schools ==
=== Elementary schools ===
- Cresson Elementary School, Norwalk
- Jersey Avenue Elementary School, Santa Fe Springs
- Lakeland Elementary School, Norwalk
- Lakeview Elementary School, Santa Fe Springs
- Paddison Elementary School, Norwalk
- William Orr Elementary School, Norwalk
- Studebaker Elementary School, Norwalk

=== Middle schools ===
- Lakeside Middle School, Norwalk
- Lake Center Middle School, Santa Fe Springs

Students continue their education beyond Grade 8 at Santa Fe High School (originally named Little Lake High School) in the Whittier Union High School District.

== Strikes ==
Strike as of 16 April 2026:Little Lake City School District teachers strike
