= Whittier High School =

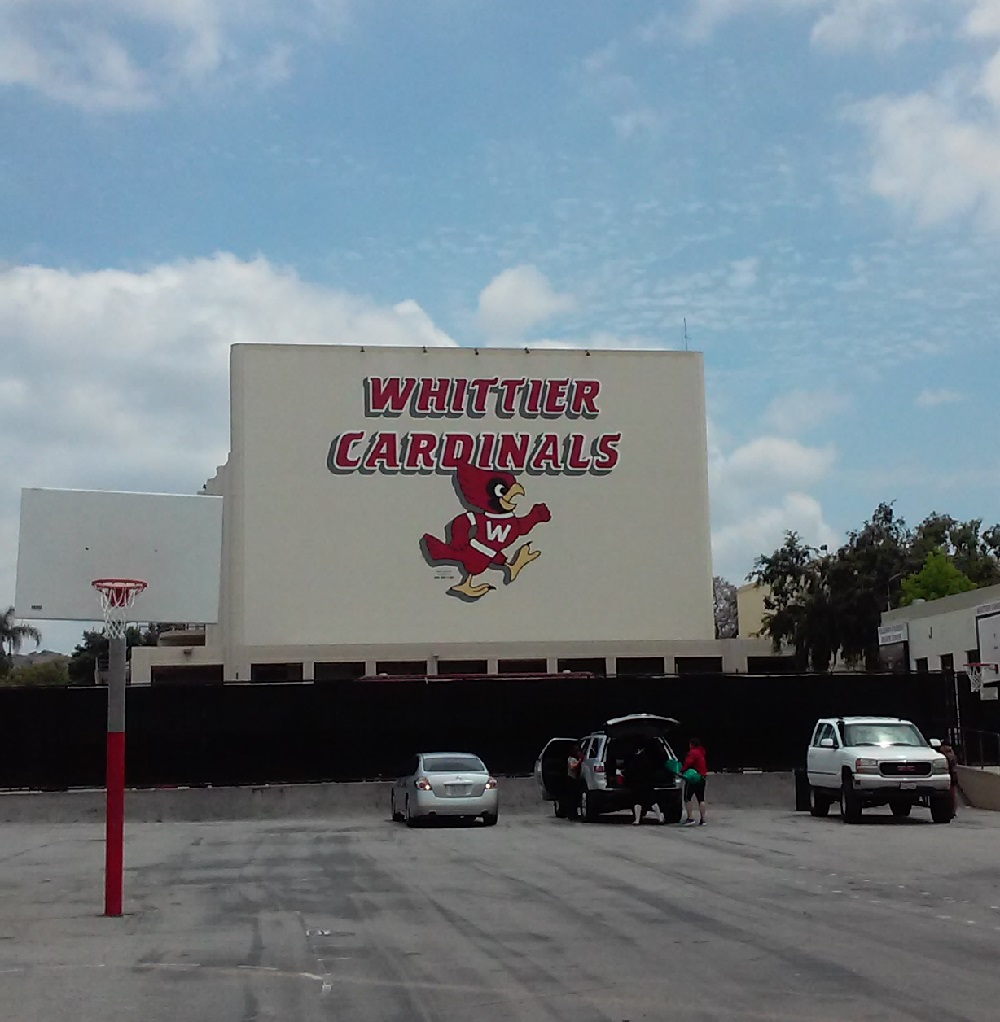
- Cardinals Mascot on School Wall

Location
- 12417 East Philadelphia St. Whittier, California 90601; United States
- 33.98050°N 118.04431°W

Information
- Type: Public
- Motto: "To Achieve and Maintain Excellence"
- Established: 1900; 126 years ago
- School district: Whittier Union High School District
- NCES School ID: 064248006955
- Principal: Andres Favela
- Teaching staff: 80.94 (on an FTE basis)
- Grades: 9–12
- Enrollment: 1,710 (2023–24)
- Student to teacher ratio: 21.13
- Colors: Red and white
- Team name: Cardinals
- Website: whs.wuhsd.org

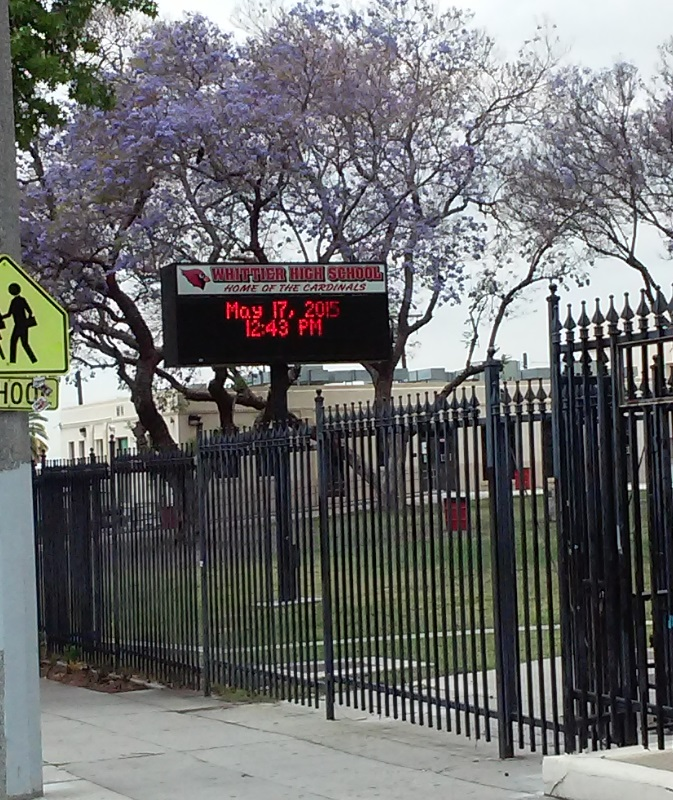
The sign in front of Whittier High School

Whittier High School (WHS) is a high school located in Whittier, California. It was the original school of the Whittier Union High School District. It is the alma mater of President Richard Nixon (class of 1930) and John Lasseter (class of 1975), founder of Pixar.

As of the 2023–24 school year, the school had 1,710 students, according to the National Center for Education Statistics.

== History ==
Whittier High School was established in 1900 when the few classes were in the upper floor of the old Jonathan Bailey School. At the time, there were 47 students enrolled in the school. The classrooms included a study hall, a library, a recitation room, a science laboratory, and the principal's office. The library contained one stack of books. For a heating unit, there was an old-fashioned wood stove. A few pictures and a statue of Julius Caesar ornamented the building. Whittier's first principal was Ulysses P. Shull.

The following year, in 1901, he was succeeded by G. Walter Monroe. Under Monroe's tenure, in 1905 a new building was opened at the corner of Philadelphia and Lindley, which is the current site of Whittier High School today. This new building was known as Whittier Union High School, and was built after the addition of the East Whittier, Ranchito, Rivera, Los Nietos, Pico, and Mill Districts.

A rapid influx of students necessitated the constructions of a girls' gym, an administration building and an auditorium in 1923. Soon after, the shops on Pierce Avenue were built.

In 1930, the cardinal was chosen as the Whittier High mascot because it is a native of Mill Creek (the area just north of Rio Hondo College). The bird was chosen because of its scarlet coat, which corresponded with the school colors. It was also felt that this bird possessed the same spirit and determination that has always been representative of Whittier High School.

The 1933 Long Beach earthquake rendered most of the buildings unsafe. Classes were held in crowded storerooms, basements, and bungalows until condemned buildings could be reconstructed. The Science Building was rebuilt in 1934; a Boys' Gym in 1935; dressing rooms and Cafeteria in 1936. The Auditorium stood idle for almost 20 years and then was renovated into the present Library.

In 1935, the Cardinal insignia was designed as a result of a contest, which lasted four months. The event was culminated by a special student body election to choose what has become the Cardinal insignia. Since then, the insignia has been used on class rings, pins, the Cardinal Key, and a victory flag.

In 1938, the District approved bonds for a new Girls' Gym and an Auditorium. Both were completed in 1940.

During World War II, Whittier High gained its first female principal, Marion Wilson Hodge.

Following World War II, the Whittier area began to grow rapidly. In 1952, the student enrollment was over 3,500. It was at this time that the District opened a new high school called El Rancho. Growth continued and in 1953, California High School opened, followed by Santa Fe in 1955, Sierra in 1957, Pioneer in 1959, La Serna in 1961, and Monte Vista in 1964. By 1966, the District had almost 16,000 students in seven schools.

On January 20, 1968, Buffalo Springfield performed in the Whittier High School auditorium.

Because of declining enrollment, two of the schools closed in 1979. Many students from the Sierra High School area came to Whittier. Following Sierra's closure, Whittier High School's enrollment slowly increased in the ensuing decades.

Several areas of the Whittier High School campus were featured as Hill Valley High School in the 1985 blockbuster film Back to the Future, and its 1989 sequel Back to the Future Part II.

The Federal Emergency Management Agency and bond financing have been obtained for district-wide structural repairs, some of which are still under way.

In 1998, the Boys Gym was destroyed by fire. The new Perry Gym opened in 2002, named for father-and-son bankers and philanthropists Hermann and Hubert Perry. The Holloway-Poucher Aquatic Center was completed in 2001. Other buildings and areas on campus are named after alumni and members of the Cardinal community: the O.C. Albertson field after the principal from 1908 to 1930, the Myron Claxton Science Building, the Vic Lopez Auditorium, the Bob Chandler Sports Complex, Marion Wilson Hodge fountain, William C. Gordon Library and Yosh Nakamura Art Building.

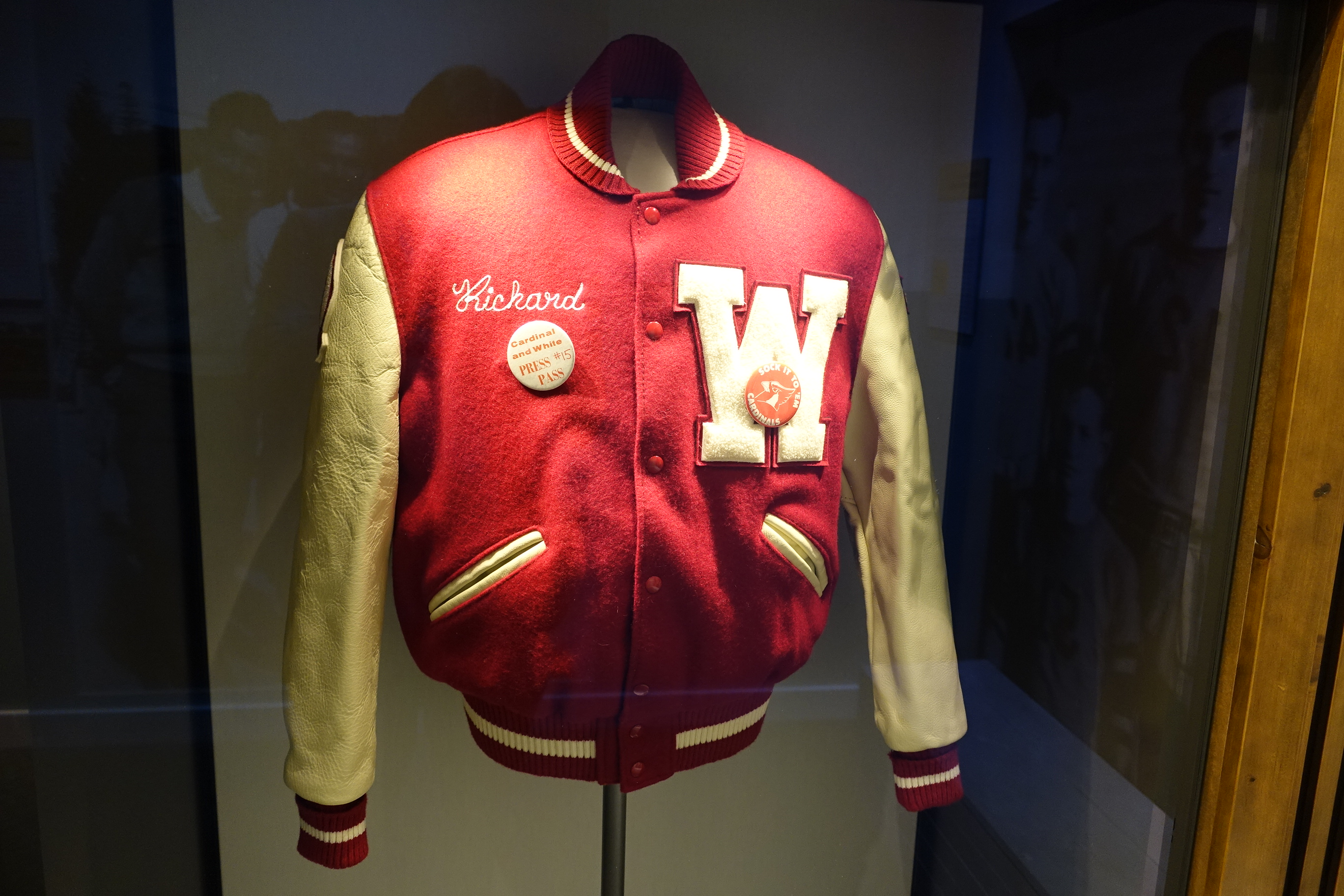
Richard Nixon letterman jacket from the Whittier High School, Back to the Beginning and Early Years part, Richard Nixon Presidential Library and Museum, Yorba Linda, CA.

== CIF Championships ==
- Baseball: 1960
- Boys' Basketball: 1948
- Football: 1964
- Golf: 2023
- Girls' Swimming: 1980, 1981
- Boys' Water Polo: 1941, 1942, 1947, 1951, 1952, 1953, 1955, 1959, 2001
- Girls' Water Polo: 2005, 2007
- Wrestling: 1931, 1935, 1955

== Notable alumni ==
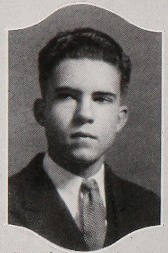
Richard Nixon, a Whittier High School Class of 1930 alumnus and the 37th President of the United States

- Glenn Allison "Mr. 900" (1948), former professional bowler, USBC Hall of Fame member
- George Buehler (1965), former professional football player, Oakland Raiders
- Patty Caretto (Brown) (1969), U.S. Olympian; former world-record holder in the women's 800 meters and 1500 meters; International Swimming Hall of Fame member
- Bob Chandler (1967), former professional football player, Buffalo Bills and the Oakland Raiders
- Helen Hannah, (1934), United States Marine 1943–75, chaperone in All-American Girls Professional Baseball League
- John Lasseter (1975), writer, director, producer, and founder of Pixar Animation Studios
- Richard Nixon (1930), 37th president of the United States
- Vaneza Pitynski (2006), actress
- Steve Saleen, driver and automobile customizer
- John Saul (1959), author
- Art Sherman (born 1937), horse trainer and jockey
