= Troy Archer =

American football player (1955–1979)

No. 77
- Position: Defensive tackle

Personal information
- Born: January 16, 1955; Glendale, California, U.S.
- Died: June 22, 1979 (aged 24); North Bergen, New Jersey, U.S.
- Listed height: 6 ft 4 in (1.93 m)
- Listed weight: 250 lb (113 kg)

Career information
- High school: California (Whittier)
- College: Colorado
- NFL draft: 1976: 1st round, 13th overall pick

Career history
- New York Giants (1976–1978)

Awards and highlights
- Second-team All-Big Eight (1975)

Career NFL statistics
- Sacks: 16.5
- Fumble recoveries: 5
- Defensive TDs: 1
- Stats at Pro Football Reference

James Troy Archer (January 16, 1955 – June 22, 1979) was an American professional football player who was a defensive tackle for three seasons with the New York Giants of the National Football League (NFL). He began playing football at age six after his father forged his birth certificate to show he was eight years old.

He played football at California High School in Whittier, California where he was smaller in stature than would be expected from a professional football player. After high school, he grew significantly while playing college football at Rio Hondo College and the University of Colorado, Boulder.

A resident of Guttenberg, New Jersey, Archer was killed in an auto accident during training camp.

== See also ==
- List of gridiron football players who died during their careers
