= Helen Hannah =

Helen Hannah Campbell (August 15, 1916 – March 24, 2013) was a chaperone in the All-American Girls Professional Baseball League for the Muskegon Lassies between 1947 and 1949. In that capacity, she "arranged their housing, uniforms, got their paychecks, arranged the buses. But they really accepted me more like a buddy. If they wanted to go out and get a burger and a beer, I'd go with them."

Born in Whittier, California to parents James and Helen, Helen's nickname was Chappie. She lived in Fountain Valley for more than four-and-a-half decades, taking an active role in her community, like her work for the Retired Senior Volunteers at the Fountain Valley Police Department. In addition, she sat on the Pacific Coast League Historical Society board of directors as well as participating in both the California Angels Booster Club and Anaheim Stadium. She remained with the team until the Korean War since she was called to active duty for the Marine Corps.

== Early life and education ==
Hannah was born into a professional baseball family, since her father, James "Truck" Hannah, was a professional baseball player for the New York Yankees and guided her into the AAGPBL. One of Helen's claims to fame was that she was the AAGPBL's last living chaperone.

She attended Whittier High School with Richard Nixon and then went on to study at Woodbury College. In later years, she was a docent at the Richard Nixon Library and Museum. She got her degree in Business Administration and a secondary one in Journalism degree. She steadily advanced while working at a defense plant. When it became clear she was not going to be promoted, in 1943, she enlisted with the Marine Corps. At that time, one had to get an availability certificate from their boss to be able to find another job and her boss would not comply, so she went down to the recruiting stations herself.

== Career ==
Helen's first duty station took place at El Toro, in July 1944. She did boot camp at Camp Lejeune, North Carolina at that time. She spent 32 years serving, and her last duty service took place at the same location where she started - El Toro - in 1975. She finished her service with the Master Gunnery Sergeant E-9 rank.

She worked for the Aviation Supply Quartermaster. She also served at NCRD San Diego, MCB Camp Pendleton: I&I (Chavez Ravine) LA. In 1960, Hannah was in Denver with the beginnings of the Women Marine Association, at which she held the following high-ranking positions: National President, National Vice President, National Chaplain, and editor of the WMA newsletter. She also held a variety of positions with her CA-5 Orange County Chapter.

== Awards ==
Hannah was the recipient of both the Good Conduct Medal with star, the American Theater of Liberations, the WWII Victory Medal, and the National Defense, Armed Forces Reserve, and Marine Corps Reserve Ribbon.
