= Los Nietos School District =

School district in California, United States

Los Nietos School District is a K-8 school district in West Whittier-Los Nietos, California, that also serves portions of Whittier, California and Santa Fe Springs, California.

Founded in 1861, it is one of the oldest school districts in Southern California. The original school in the district eventually became Los Nietos Middle School, with the oldest portions of the current building dating from the 1920s and 1930s. Postwar housing developments within the school district boundaries necessitated construction of more schools.

Students in the district feed to Pioneer High School in the Whittier Union High School District.

== Schools ==
- Ada S. Nelson Elementary School, West Whittier-Los Nietos
- Aoelian Elementary School, West Whittier-Los Nietos
- Rancho Santa Gertrudes Elementary School, Santa Fe Springs
- Los Nietos Middle School, West Whittier-Los Nietos
