= Luis Aguilar (soccer) =

American soccer player (born 1984)

Personal information
- Full name: Luis Aguilar
- Date of birth: January 29, 1984 (age 42)
- Place of birth: Long Beach, California, United States
- Height: 5 ft 8 in (1.73 m)
- Position: Defender

Youth career
- 2002–2003: Rio Hondo College
- 2004–2005: San Francisco Dons

Senior career*
Years	Team	Apps	(Gls)
2005	Ajax Orlando Prospects	3	(0)
2006–2007	California Cougars (indoor)		
2007	California Victory	19	(0)
2007–2008	Montreal Impact	7	(0)
- * Club domestic league appearances and goals

Luis Aguilar (born January 29, 1984) is an American former soccer player who last played as a defender for Montreal Impact in the USL First Division.

== Career ==
Aguilar was born in Long Beach, California. He graduated from La Mirada High School. He attended Rio Hondo College for two years, playing on the men's soccer team in 2002 and 2003. He was a 2002 2007 NSCAA/adidas Men's Junior College Division III All-America. In 2004, Aguilar transferred to the University of San Francisco. He completed his collegiate career in 2005 after winning back-to-back WCC Division I titles with Second and First Team All-WCC awards. In March 2005, Aguilar joined the Ajax Orlando Prospects of the USL Premier Development League. Aguilar was drafted by the California Cougars of Major Indoor Soccer League in March 2006. Aguilar played with the San Francisco Seals. He later played for the Ajax Orlando Prospects. In 2007, he signed with the USL First Division expansion team California Victory. He played nineteen games with the Victory before being traded to the Montreal Impact on July 30, 2007. He then played seven games with the Impact through the end of the 2007 season that includes making the starting squad for the playoffs. He was signed to a 3-year contract extension with the Impact and played through the first half of the 2008 season until an injury caused him to retire early. He currently resides in San Francisco.
