= Pioneer High School (Los Angeles County, California) =

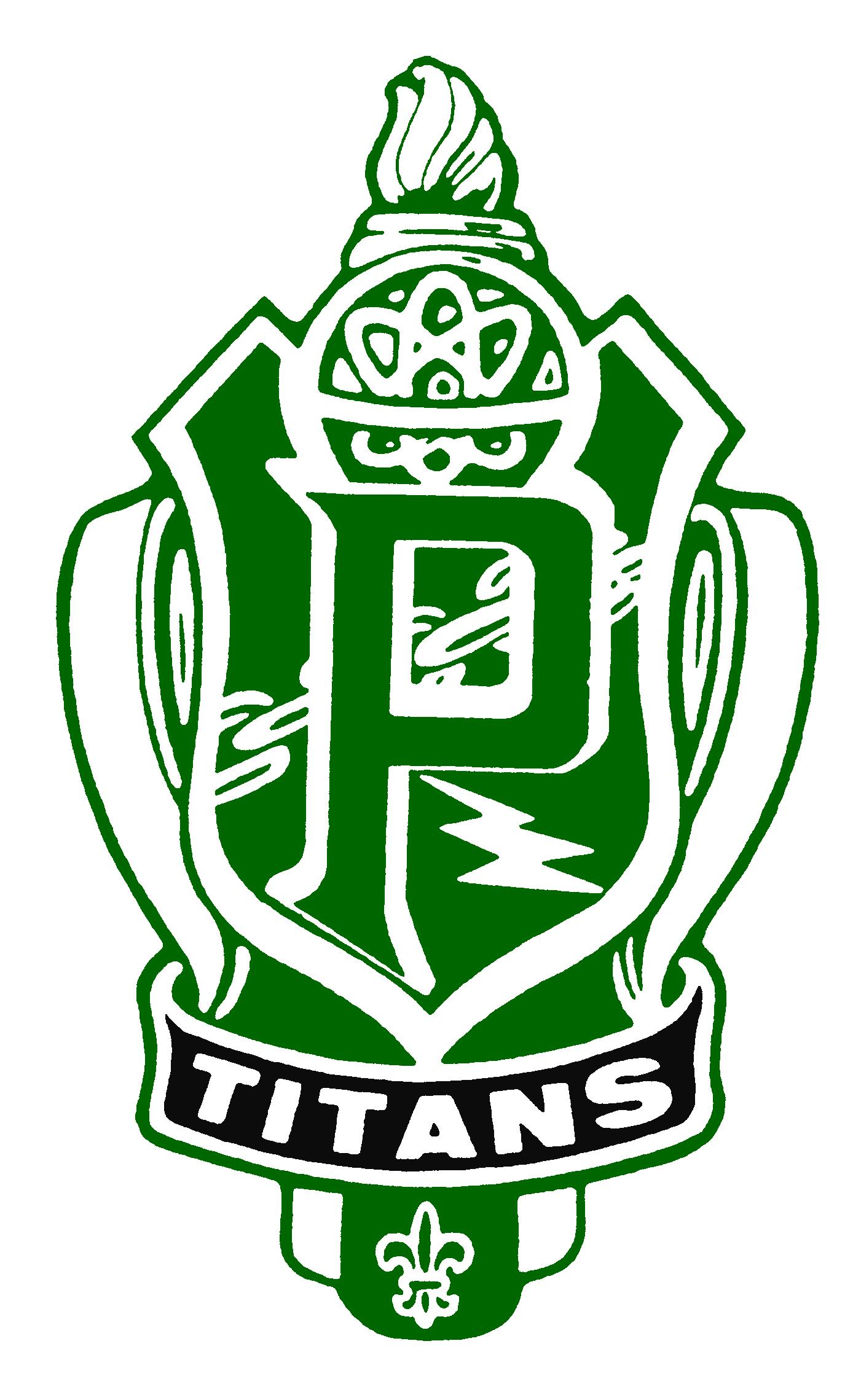

Location
- 10800 Benavon St. Whittier, California 90606; United States; 33.9707°N 118.0793°W

Information
- Type: Public secondary
- Opened: September 14, 1959
- Status: Open
- School district: Whittier Union High School District
- Principal: Mary Chapman
- Teaching staff: 57.31 (FTE)
- Grades: 9–12
- Enrollment: 1,072 (2023-2024)
- Student to teacher ratio: 18.71
- Colors: Green, black, and white
- Mascot: 'Tuffy' the Titan
- Nickname: PiHi or Pioneer
- Team name: Titans
- Newspaper: Titan Tribune (1959-200X)
- Yearbook: The Torch
- Website: phs.wuhsd.org

Pioneer High School is a public school in West Whittier-Los Nietos, a census-designated place in unincorporated Los Angeles County, California.

== Academics ==
Pioneer High School encourages the taking of AP courses in order to challenge and prepare for college.

Pioneer High School offers a wide variety of AP courses, which include:

- AP Biology
- AP Calculus AB
- AP Calculus BC
- AP Chemistry
- AP English Language and Composition
- AP English Literature and Composition
- AP Environmental Science
- AP French Language and Culture
- AP Human Geography
- AP Physics C
- AP Spanish Language and Culture
- AP Spanish Literature and Culture
- AP United States Government and Politics
- AP United States History
- AP World History: Modern

== General information ==
Pioneer High School, home of the Titans, is located in unincorporated community of West Whittier-Los Nietos, California, neighboring the city of Pico Rivera. The school serves students from the Los Nietos, South Whittier, and Whittier City school districts. PHS is one of the 5 comprehensive high schools in the Whittier Union High School District.

== Demographics ==
The student body at Pioneer is 96.4% Hispanic, 1.8% White, and less than 1% each Asian, Black, Native American and Pacific Islander. (As of 2020–2021)

== Titan sports ==
=== Fall sports ===
- Cross country
- Football 2024 CIF Southern Section Championship Division 14; CIF Southern California Regional Division 7-A Championship; 2025 CIF Southern Section Championship Division 14
- Tennis (girls)
- Volleyball (girls)
- Water polo (boys)

=== Winter sports ===
- Basketball
- Soccer - 1979 3A CIF Southern Section Championship; 1979
- Wrestling -

=== Spring sports ===
- Baseball
- Golf
- Softball
- Swimming
- Tennis (boys)
- Track & field
- Volleyball (boys)

=== Summer sports ===
- Wrestling
- Baseball
- Basketball
- Cross country
- Football
- Soccer
- Tennis
- Volleyball
- Water polo

== Notable former pupils ==
- Lauren Tewes; actress.
