= Lauren Tewes =

American actress

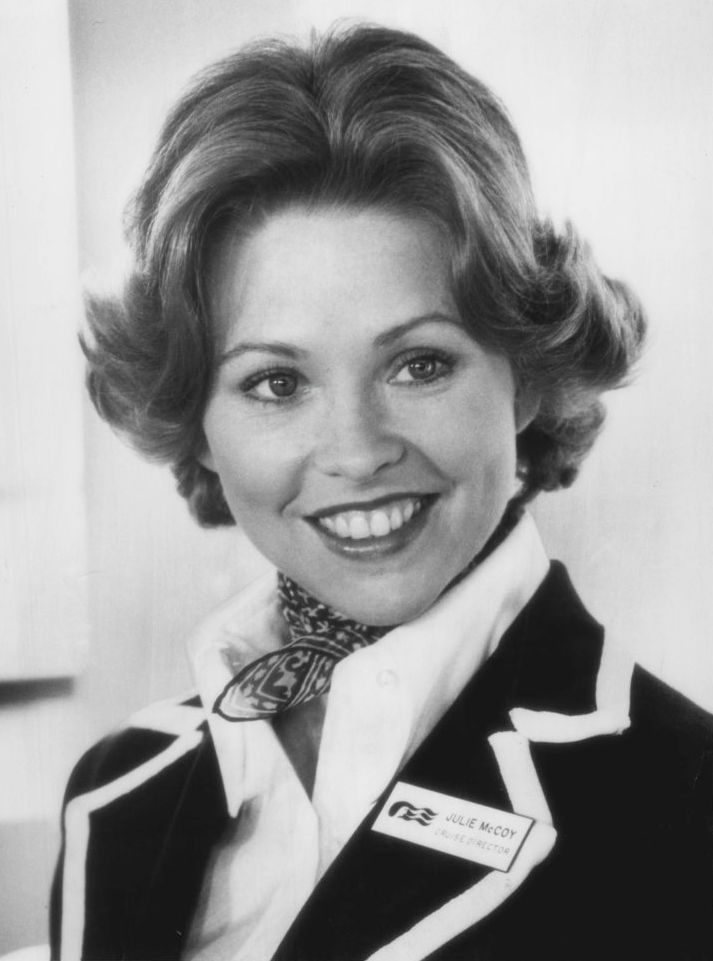
- Tewes in The Love Boat, 1977
- Born: Cynthia Lauren Tewes; October 26, 1953 (age 73); Trafford, Pennsylvania, U.S.
- Education: Rio Hondo College; University of California, Riverside (unfinished); Pacific Conservatory Theatre; Pioneer High School
- Occupation: Actress
- Years active: 1973–present
- Known for: Julie McCoy – The Love Boat
- Spouses: John Wassel (m. 1977; div. 1982) Paolo Nonnis (m. 1985; div. 1995) Robert Nadir (m. 1996; died 2002)

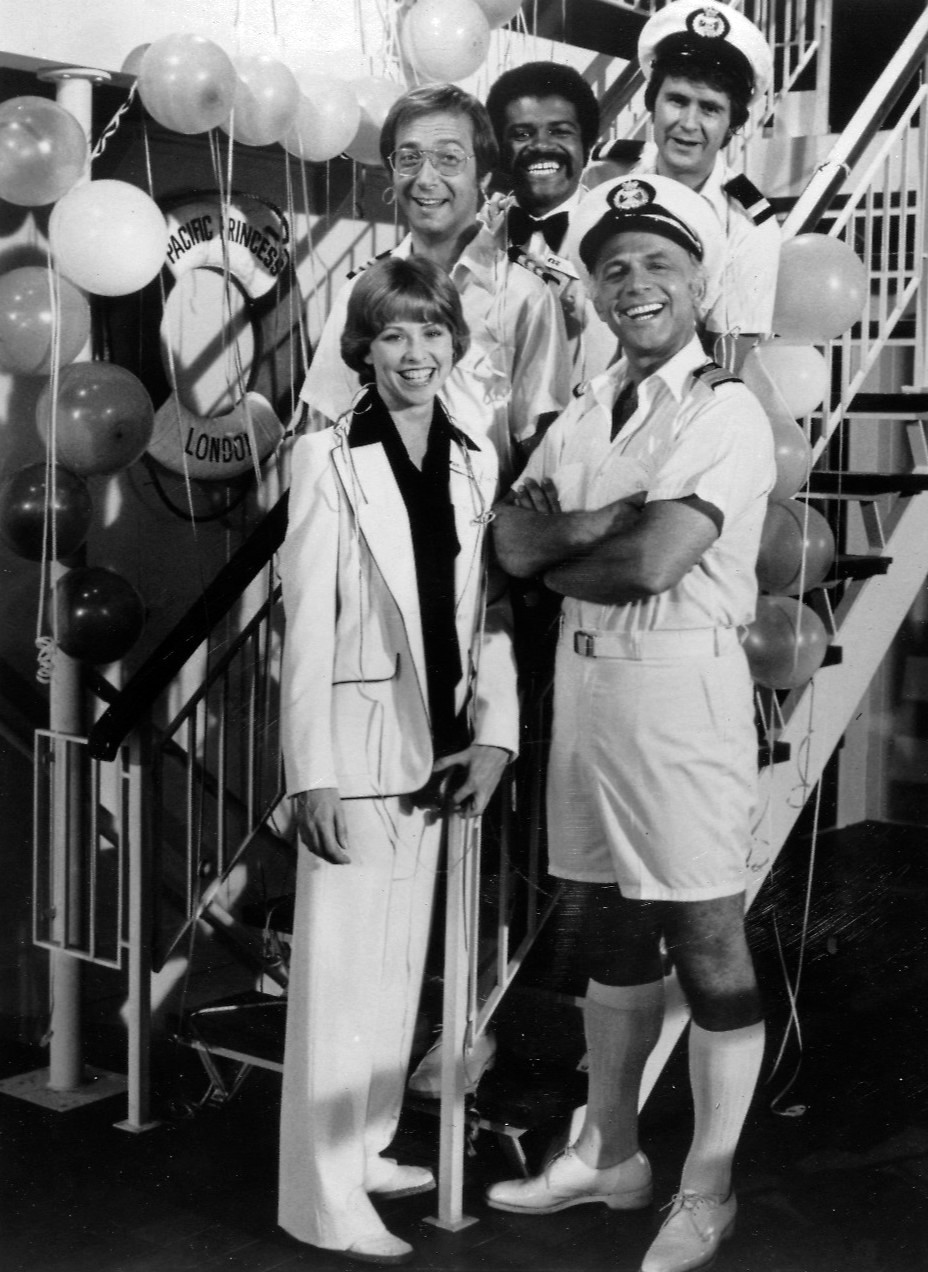
Tewes with fellow Love Boat cast members

Cynthia Lauren Tewes (/ˈtwiːz/; born October 26, 1953) is an American actress. She played Julie McCoy on the television anthology series The Love Boat, which originally aired on ABC from 1977 to 1986.

== Early years ==
Tewes was born in Trafford, Pennsylvania, of German extraction, and one of four children born to Joanne (née Woods) and Joseph Tewes, a wood pattern maker. Regarding the proper pronunciation of her last name, Tewes later explained, "[It] was originally pronounced 'Tavis.' But when my grandfather arrived in Ellis Island from Germany, the immigration official carelessly said his name was "Tweeze," and it hung on ever since.'"

The family moved to Whittier, California when Tewes was eight. She attended Ada S. Nelson Elementary School and Pioneer High School, where she studied drama, winning Best Actress award for three years. Tewes enrolled on an Associate of Arts degree at Rio Hondo College, deciding to major in theatre arts. At college, she won "The Chancellor's Award for Excellence in Theatre", a one-year scholarship which enabled her to transfer to the University of California, Riverside, as a sophomore.

In 1973, when her scholarship expired, Tewes withdrew from college and joined the Pacific Conservatory Theatre in Santa Maria, California, as an apprentice, making her stage debut in Arsenic and Old Lace and The Most Happy Fella before becoming a member of the Birdcage Theatre Company at Knott's Berry Farm, an amusement complex outside Los Angeles.

== Career ==
Tewes' first break came in mid-1974 when she starred in a Lipton Ice Tea commercial, allowing her to join the Screen Actors Guild and to register with an agent with the prospect of working on film projects.

Tewes was soon cast in roles on the prime time TV series Charlie's Angels ("Angels in Chains"), Vega$ ("My Darling Daughter"), and Family ("Mirror, Mirror on the Wall...") as Jill Redfield, a disenchanted Pasadena debutante. However, it was her role in Starsky & Hutch ("Starsky and Hutch Are Guilty") as Sharon Freemont, an assistant district attorney, which brought her to the attention of Aaron Spelling.

Tewes was cast for the role of cruise director Julie McCoy on The Love Boat, selected from more than 100 actresses who auditioned. She starred in the third and final pilot of the show, cast the day before production began on the Pacific Princess in San Pedro. Tewes recalls the pilot episode:

"I had to borrow money to get a new tire, because my ’62 Volkswagen Bug was not going to get to San Pedro…. That first day, standing there in the little outfit, and I had to say, ”Hi, welcome aboard, I’m Julie McCoy, your cruise director” a gazillion times. But I kept screwing it up and saying, ”Hi, welcome aboard, I’m Julie MacLeod…” because I was talking to Gavin MacLeod and I was so excited."

In parallel, Tewes appeared in 1979 TV film Dallas Cowboys Cheerleaders alongside Jane Seymour and made her film debut in the 1981 film Eyes of a Stranger, which co-starred a young Jennifer Jason Leigh.

In 1984, after seven seasons on The Love Boat, Tewes was replaced after a highly public battle with cocaine addiction, which she eventually overcame. She did reprise her role as a guest in a 1985 episode, and in the television films in the 1986–87 season.

Tewes was cast in a 1985 CBS sitcom pilot Anything for Love. The pilot aired as a special that summer, but was not picked up as a series. She went on to guest-star in classic 1980s TV series My Two Dads, The New Mike Hammer, Murder, She Wrote, T. J. Hooker and Hunter.

In 1994, Tewes moved to Seattle and focused on regional theatre acting and directing across the country. In Seattle, she performed with the Tacoma Actors Guild and the Seattle Repertory Theatre. As well as doing voice-overs for commercials, Tewes continued her TV career and appeared in a 1998 episode of Love Boat: The Next Wave, a two-season revival of the original series. In 2000–01, she had a recurring role as a police detective on The Fugitive.

Tewes plays Maxine Murdoch in the Imagination Theatre comedy-mystery radio series Murder and the Murdochs, which debuted in 2020. She has also played roles in episodes of other radio series on Imagination Theatre.

== Culinary school ==
Tewes attended culinary school to become a cheese specialist and works as a sous-chef for a catering company in Seattle when not acting.

== Personal life ==
Tewes has been married three times: first to John Wassel, a TV commercials director; then to Paolo Nonnis, an Italian drummer; and, lastly, to stage actor Robert Nadir. In 1987, she suffered the loss of her one-month-old daughter, who was born prematurely.

== Filmography ==
=== Film ===
| Year | Title | Role | Notes |
|---|---|---|---|
| 1981 | Eyes of a Stranger | Jane Harris | Slasher film |
| 1993 | Magic Kid | Mom | aka The Little Ninja Dragon (United Kingdom) |
| 1995 | The Doom Generation | TV Anchorwoman | independent black comedy thriller film |
| 1997 | Nowhere | Julie The Newscaster | black comedy drama film |
| 2021 | Potato Dreams of America | Nina Ivanovna | dramedy |

=== Television ===
| Year | Title | Role | Notes |
|---|---|---|---|
| 1976 | Police Story | Kathy | Episode: "Trash Detail, Front and Center" |
| 1977 | Family | Jill Redfield | Episode: "Mirror, Mirror on the Wall..." |
| 1977 | ABC Weekend Special | Sharon | Episode: "The Haunted Trailer" |
| 1977 | Starsky & Hutch | Sharon Freemont | Episode: "Starsky and Hutch Are Guilty" |
| 1977–1987 | The Love Boat | Cruise Director Julie McCoy | 199 episodes |
| 1978 | Vega$ | Cindy Smalley | Episode: "Yes, My Darling Daughter" |
| 1979 | Dallas Cowboys Cheerleaders | Jessie Mathews | Television film |
| 1976–1979 | Charlie's Angels | Christine Hunter, Julie McCoy | 2 episodes |
| 1978–1984 | Fantasy Island | Jane Howell / Bebe DeForrest | 2 episodes |
| 1985 | The New Mike Hammer | Chastity | Episode: "Firestorm" |
| 1985 | Finder of Lost Loves | Dorothy Keating | Episode: "Surrogates" |
| 1985 | T.J. Hooker | Cynthia Randolph | Episode: "Lag Time" |
| 1985 | Anything for Love | Dot Bailey | Television film |
| 1985 | Murder, She Wrote | Betty Jordan | Episode: "A Lady in the Lake" |
| 1986 | Hunter | Sheila Burke | Episode: "True Confessions" |
| 1984–1986 | Hotel | Paula Todd, Ellen Pierson | 2 episodes |
| 1987 | Sky Commanders | Red McCullough | Voice, 2 episodes |
| 1988 | My Two Dads | Karen Kupkus | Episode: "Friends of the Family" |
| 1990 | The China Lake Murders | Kitty | Television film |
| 1990 | Camp Cucamonga | Mrs. Scott | Television film |
| 1991 | Who's the Boss? | Lavonne | Episode: "This Sold House" |
| 1992–1993 | Dark Justice | | 2 episodes |
| 1994 | Weird Science | Ms. Tankey | Episode: "One Size Fits All" |
| 1994 | Attack of the 5 Ft. 2 In. Women | Hostess | Television film |
| 1996 | It Came from Outer Space II | Carolee Minter | Television film |
| 1997 | Martin | Julie McCoy | Episode: "Goin' Overboard" |
| 1998 | Love Boat: The Next Wave | Julie McCoy | Episode: "Reunion" |
| 2001 | The Fugitive | Linda Westershulte | 4 episodes |
| 2017 | Twin Peaks | Neighbor | Episode: "There's Fire Where You Are Going" |

=== Video games ===
| Year | Title | Voice |
|---|---|---|
| 1996 | You Don't Know Jack Volume 2 | Herself |

== Awards and nominations ==
| Year | Association | Category | Production | Result |
|---|---|---|---|---|
| 1982 | 39th Golden Globe Awards | Best Supporting Actress in a Series, Miniseries or Motion Picture Made for Television | The Love Boat as Julie McCoy | Nominated |
