= Margaret F. Slusher =

American businesswoman

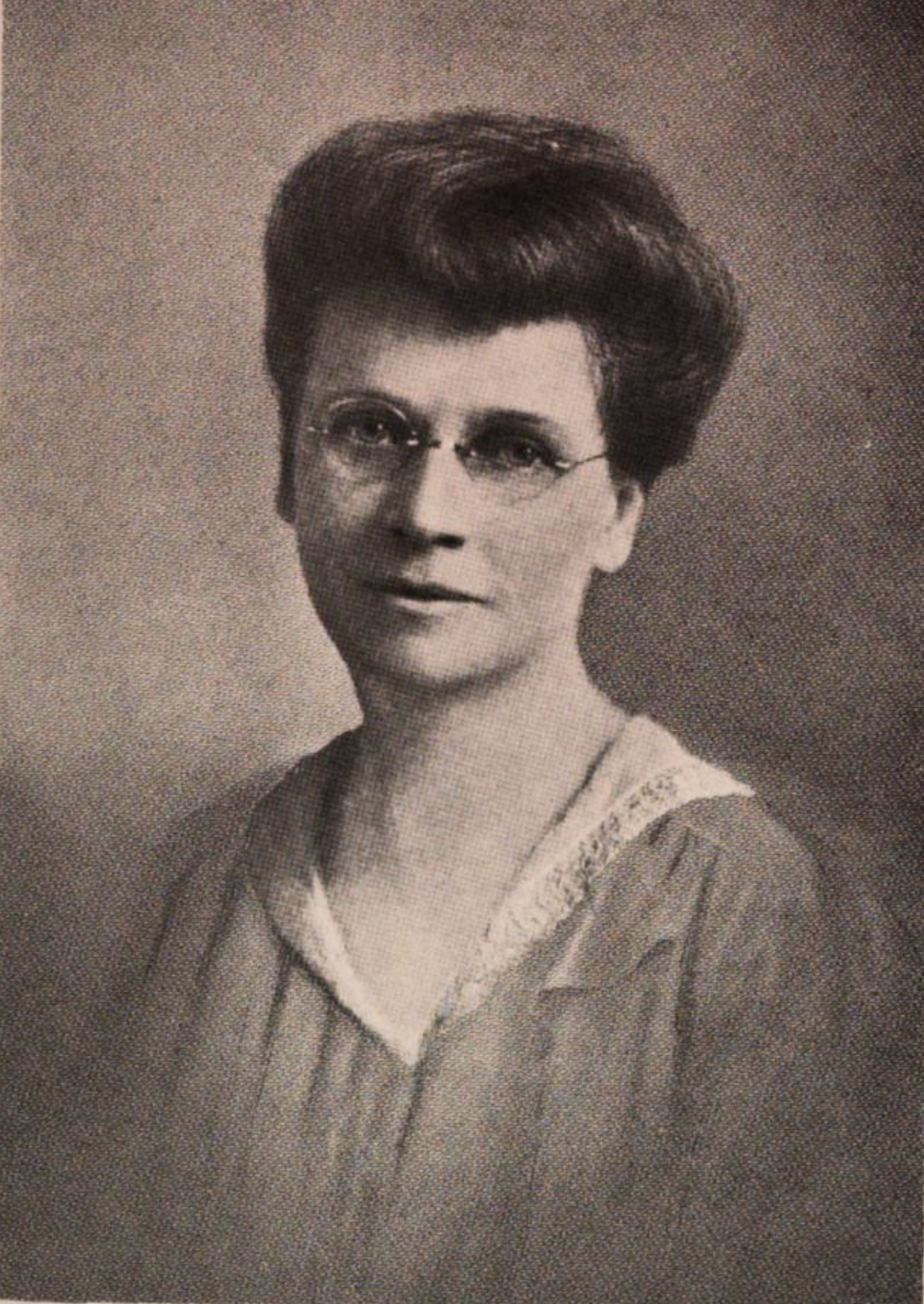
- Slusher in 1921
- Born: Margaret Frances Campbell; May 9, 1879; Livermore, California, U.S.
- Died: June 18, 1971 (aged 92); Los Angeles County, U.S.
- Occupation: Businesswoman
- Organization: Quality Laundry
- Spouse: Silas Floyd Slusher (m. 1902; died 1946)

Signature
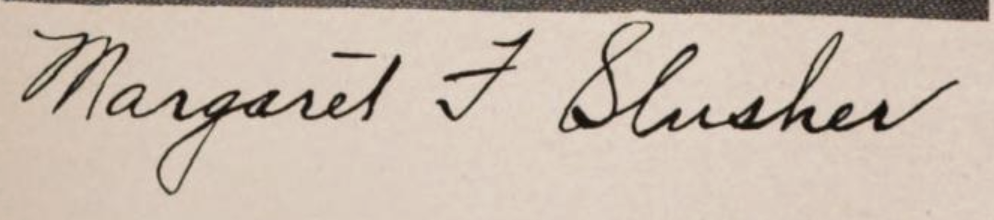

Margaret F. Slusher (née, Campbell; 1879–1971) was an American businesswoman who was founder, president, general manager, and owner for 20 years of Quality Laundry, one of Los Angeles, California's largest laundries. Investing her earnings, she was the owner of several orange groves, one being at Santa Ana and another of 45 acres (18 ha) being located at Santa Fe Springs, as well as valuable city property in Los Angeles. When petroleum was discovered on her ranch in Santa Fe Springs, she became a millionaire. In its day, the Slusher property and that around Santa Fe Springs was the sixth largest oil field in the world. With her wealth, Slusher collected antiques which equaled if not surpassed any other private collection in the United States.

== Early life and education ==
Margaret Frances Campbell was born at Livermore, California, May 9, 1879. Her parents were J. C. and Mary Ellen (Langenkamp) Campbell, the former a native of Virginia, and for years the owner of a large plantation near Wheeling, West Virginia, and the latter born at Springfield, Illinois. One of her sisters, Mrs. Clara Hall, was the manager of a successful tea room, "The Tea Cup", at San Francisco; another sister, Mrs. James E. Morgan, was the wife of a retired capitalist of Los Angeles; a brother, George W. Campbell, was engaged in business in Paris, France; a cousin, Walter John Bartnett, was a wealthy business man of San Francisco, and formerly was vice president of the Gould Railway System; and a niece, Miss Sadie Morgan, was in charge of a Los Angeles dancing academy.

At the age of six, she came from San Francisco to Los Angeles on a visit. It was at the time of the smallpox epidemic in the early 1880s. Though she survived, her parents didn't. Ultimately, she was raised in a Catholic orphanage.

Slusher attended the public schools of Los Angeles and later, when she realized the necessity of further training, took a course at and graduated from the Bromberger Business College.

== Career ==
=== Laundry business ===
Slusher began her career at an early age, leaving home at the age of twelve years to make her own way and create her own opportunities. She washed laundry at night, and delivered it during the day.

At the age of fifteen, Slusher became interested in the laundry business, and began to work at the Excelsior Laundry. She worked as a US$4.50 a week collar girl in a laundry. At the Excelsior, she was rapidly promoted until given charge of several departments, but it was her constant and unfaltering ambition to become proprietor of an establishment of her own, where she could work out her ideas and plans, and an opportunity for the realization of her aims came in 1899, in which year she established her own business. A group of stockholders offered a laundry concern to Slusher to run, because they were deep in debt, and she had a few shares in it herself. At the time, there was just one wagon for pick-up and delivery, plus small, inferior equipment.

In 1901, Slusher established the New Method Laundry, using steam to clean the laundry. Located at 6th and San Julian streets, she sold the shop in 1907.

For US$13,500, she constructed a new building on Paloma Street in what became the Garment District. It contained an electric plant, paint shop, and water system. She took occupancy in the new laundry on March 7, 1907. She gave it a new name, Quality Laundry, hired more than 70 employees, and accepted US$100,000 of debt. She gave much of the credit for her success to the fact that she was able to select good employees.

Acting on the impulse to know that her employees handled delicate fabrics and textures with care and efficiency, Slusher made a special study of dyes, silks, fine cloth, delicate weaves and materials, It was her policy not to use acids of any sort; the only agents used in her steam laundry were pure soap and pure water. At the same time, she continued to watch for chances to make small investments, particularly in buying stock in the laundries in which she was employed.

=== World War I ===
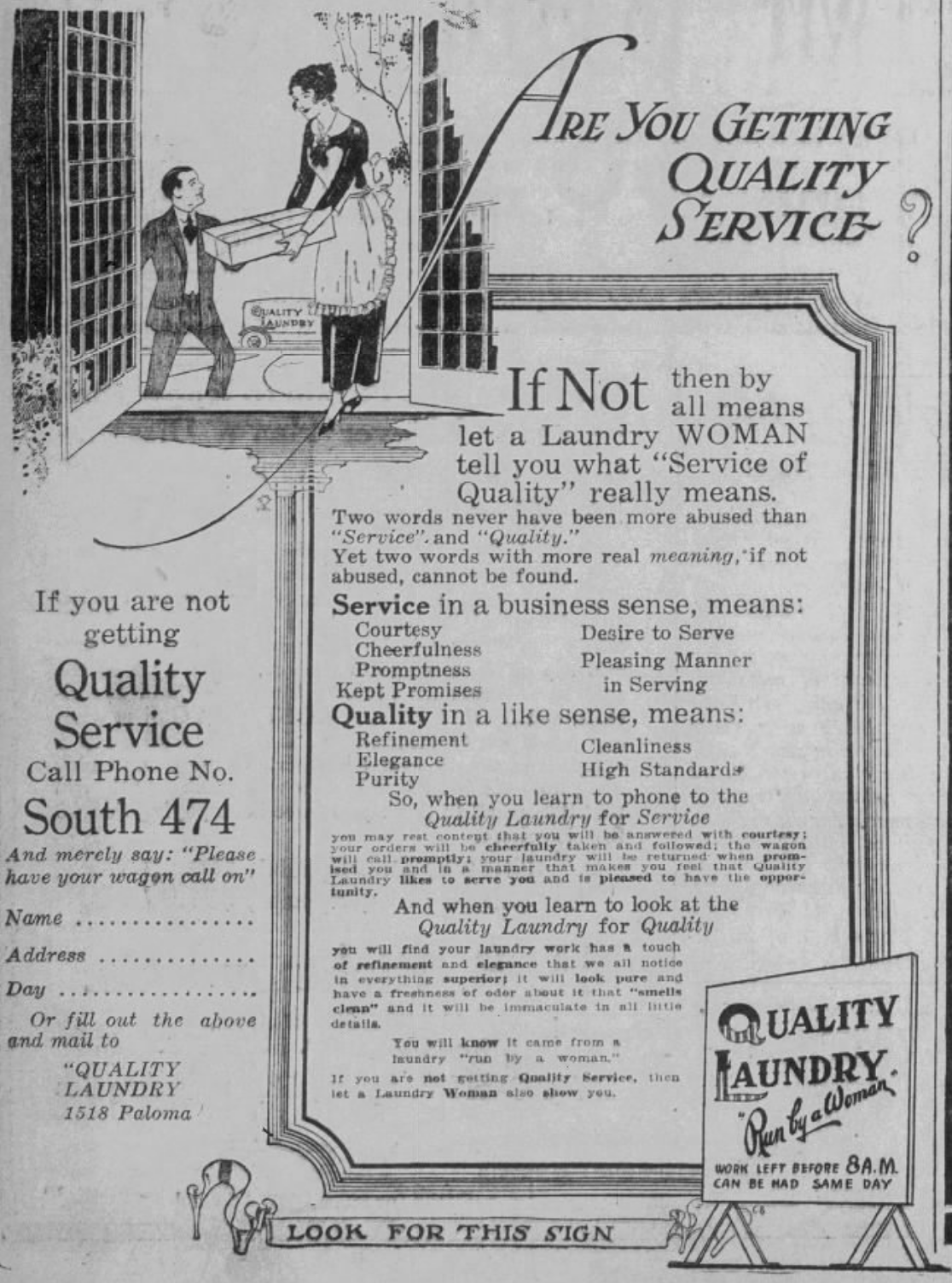
Quality Laundry advertisement, 1919

In 1918, she had been with Quality Laundry for 11 years. Its slogan, "Run by a Woman", was blazoned in electric lights. She had 100 women working for her, as well as a few men to do the heavy, unskilled work in the wash shop. The rest were women and they were paid men's wages.

Slusher devoted her activities to the building up of an exclusive patronage, and at the time of the entrance of the United States into World War I, her business consisted chiefly in handling the elite work of the city, delivery being made by private cars. The elect of the social world, prominent actresses and opera singers, formed the principal part of her customers, and in handling this kind of lingerie, Slusher did a business approximating some US$4,000 per week. Her quick perception told her at the outset of the United States' participation in the conflict that the opportunity to do big business was at hand, and without assistance, she contrived to secure contracts for all the army and navy work at San Pedro, California: Fort MacArthur and the Naval Base San Pedro. Immediately, the volume of business done jumped to huge proportions, and in 1918 alone, she did US$130,000 worth of U.S. government business. At one time, she had for laundering in her place of business 182,000 pair of socks, for which the Red Cross did the darning; 10,000 suits of khaki; and 22,000 blankets.

In February 1918, Slusher violated the eight-hour law for women when she worked her force of women overtime to complete a rush order for a naval unit which was about to leave port. The state labor commission prosecuted the charge. Slusher admitted she worked her employees overtime but stated that she considered it a patriotic move and took the naval order in the nature of a command, andn fought the charges.

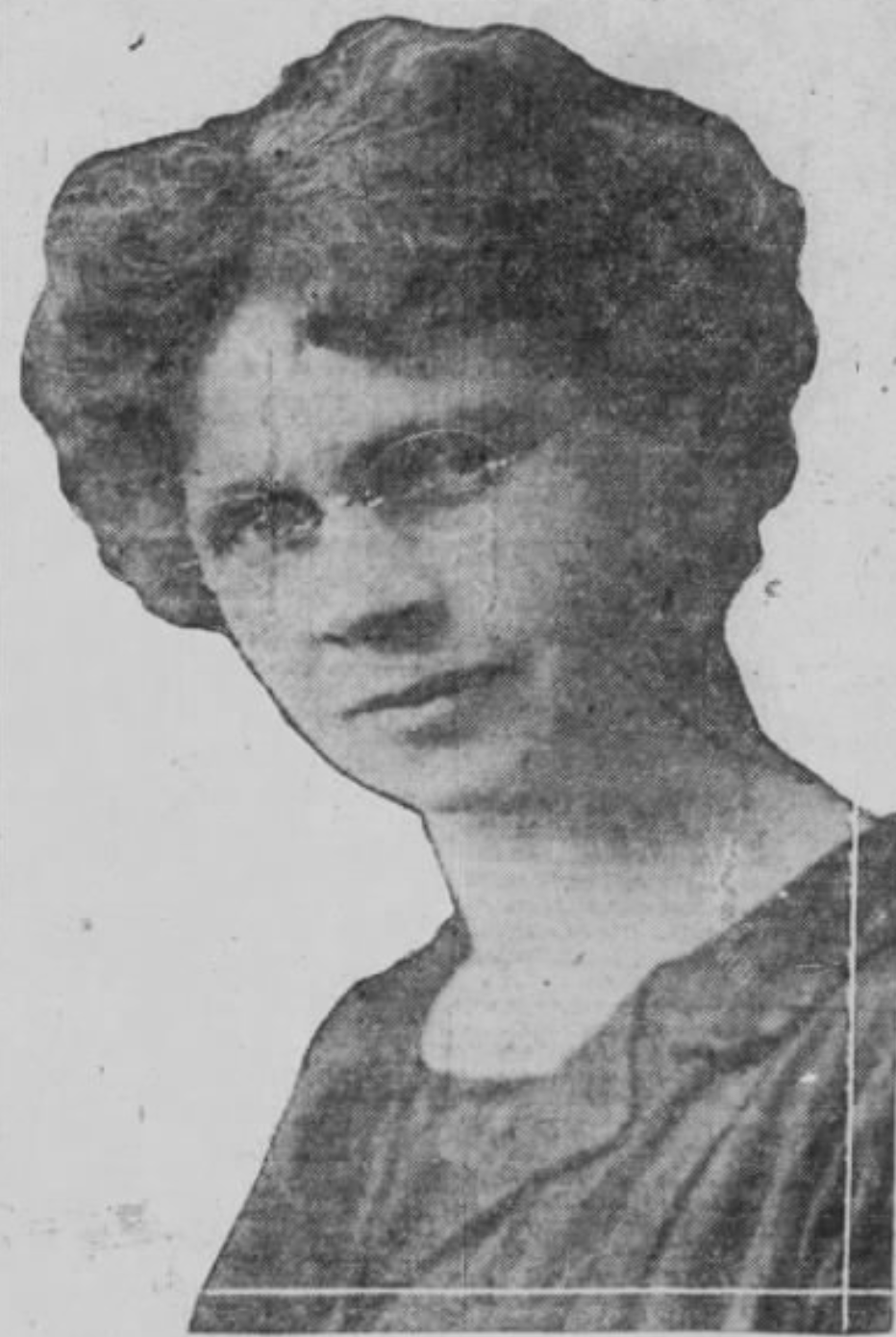
1919

In the landing of these contracts, Slusher had gained advantage on other laundries, managed by men, who endeavored to make up for their delinquency and tardiness in action by acquiring control of her business. She was deluged with offers to buy her plant, but her price of US$150,000 was beyond what they desired to pay, and they accordingly adopted tactics designed to put her out of business. They found, however, that Slusher's capabilities included a marked tendency to grimly hold on to what she had worked so hard and fairly to obtain and to determinedly and skillfully fight back, with the result that the controversy led to considerable publicity, terminating in the publishing of the valiant woman's picture in the leading newspapers of the city, April 17, 1919. The reaction was immediate, Slusher receiving many letters of sympathy and congratulation and being forced to take innumerable interviews. The results, on the whole, were satisfactory, for while the notoriety was unpleasant, she was able to view the matter in a philosophic light in that hers was the victory and that the advertising thus gained brought her additional business.

In 1922, she sold Quality Laundry for US$150,000. She held a retirement and farewell party at her Santa Fe Springs ranch in May where she entertained several hundred of her employees and friends.

=== Santa Fe Springs property ===
In 1916, Slusher wanted to buy a home in the country whose location would be close enough to Los Angeles to permit her to go back and forth business each day. A 45-acre ranch with groves of orange and olive trees attracted her one day as she drove past Santa Fe Springs. The ranch, a portion of Gov. Pio Pico's estate, was owned by a Los Angeles man prominent in legal circles, and was for sale for US$30,000. Slusher bought the 47 acres (19 ha) Hawkins-Nimoc land that year from attorney Eugene Overton. She borrowed US$5,000 as first payment on the ranch and moved in.

A month after she bought it, a wealthy neighbor, whose land adjoined hers, offered her twice what she paid for it, and later increased his offer to US$75,000. She refused, and with her husband, continued to live on the ranch in the ensuing years. In addition to a mansion that contained 22 or 23 rooms, there were large gardens, and a rare plant conservatory. The exotic trees and statuary were part of a development by a Mr. Hawkins in the 1860s. Mr. Nimoc, the next owner, continued planting and adding fine trees.

A crew of geologists appeared in 1921. They were followed by a group of workmen, and the Bell well, historic precursor of Santa Fe Springs' group of derricks, appeared close to the Slusher ranch.

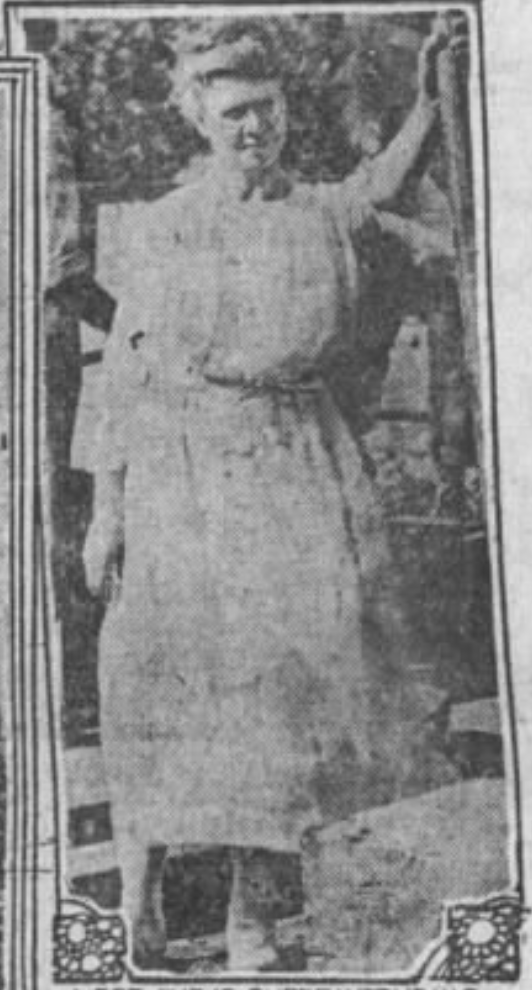
Slusher with an oil derrick in her orange grove, 1922

In 1922, Slusher possessed a contract with the Shell Oil Company, by which she received US$30,000 as bonus, US$38,000 for the trees on the ranch, and royalty terms which made her income since then run between US$20,000 and US$58,000 a month. The petroleum on her ranch turned her into a millionaire. In 1924, there were 12 oil wells on the Slusher property. She leased the oil rights to Shell Oil Company and Union Oil Company. Slusher and her husband added an aviary and filled it with exotic birds.

== Personal life ==
On July 23, 1902, at Odd Fellows Temple in Pasadena, California, she married Silas Floyd Slusher (Floyd, Virginia, 1875 - Los Angeles, November 1946), a railroad fireman. They made their first home in Pasadena. The couple had no children.

"I am an American and I don't buy abroad. The money I spend was made in America and here it shall be spent." (Margaret F. Slusher, July 5, 1929)

In addition to having considerable success as a newspaper woman, Slusher was active in club life of Los Angeles. At time of marriage, she had been a Past Noble Grand at Paloma Lodge, Odd Fellows; her husband had also been a member of Odd Fellows at the time. She collected rare antiques, some of which she displayed in 1929 at the annual Elks Order national convening at the Elks' Temple, overlooking Westlake Park. The 50,000 women who were accompanying their husbands were considered to be the main attendees who would enjoy viewing Slusher's antiques. These included: cloisonnes centuries old, from small ornaments to six-foot vases in royal and Chinese blue, old marbles from Italy, Vatican lanters, Czechoslovak majolicas, temple pieces of satsuma cloisenne, priceless old wood and ivory carvings, rare furnishings of teakwood from China, old oaks from Italy, life-size fourteenth century wood carving of an old Franciscan monk from a monastery near Naples, rare Carrara marble pieces including one particularly beautiful of Mignon, an ancient Ivory carving of an eagle poised for flight, and old Italian lights from the front of the Vatican.

With her husband as driver, Slusher was in an automobile accident near her home in Santa Fe Springs in November 1921, in which she was thrown through the glass side of the sedan and was severely cut and bruised.

Slusher traveled through Europe in 1924. In 1933, Mr. and Mrs. Slusher traveled with Colonel and Mrs. W. M. Goodale to chicago, New York, Atlantic City, New Orleans, and Canada.

The Slushers bought the Mineral Springs Hotel in Topanga, California in 1927, and three years later, built what became known as "The Goat House". Slusher also built a home in Beverly Hills as well as apartments near the Los Angeles Country Club. Located at 555 North Rossmore Avenue, it was the largest new apartment construction in Los Angeles in three years. They put up for sale their Los Angeles city home, located on Lafayette Square at 1717 Virginia Road, in 1928. It was constructed of cement plaster and contained 12 rooms, four primary bedrooms of which two were en suite, large dressing rooms and baths. The lot measured about 130 by 150 feet (40 m × 46 m). A 2-car garage included chauffeur's quarters.

On November 18, 1941, the Slusher's Santa Fe Springs mansion, located on Telegraph Road near Norwalk Boulevard, burned down in a fire; it had been a city landmark for 90 years. With it, Slusher lost much of her art collection. What she was able to salvage was moved into the cottage she built where the mansion had stood; she named the cottage, "Maggie’s Shack".

Thereafter, she split her time between the residences in Santa Fe Springs residence and Beverly Hills. In addition to Howard Hughes and Ronald Reagan, Slusher's guests at her various homes included Jack Benny, Edgar Bergen, Ingrid Bergman, James Cagney, Leo Carrillo, Nat King Cole, Bob Hope, Lena Horne, and Hedda Hopper. She entertained 300 visitors and members of the California Women of the Golden West at her Alhambra estate in November 1932.

== Death and legacy ==
Margaret Slusher died in Los Angeles County on June 18, 1971, age 92. She left her estate to the Shriners Hospital and the American Society for the Prevention of Cruelty to Animals.

Heritage Park in Santa Fe Springs was created in 1985 on what was at one time the Slusher ranch. That land was first settled by the Gabrielino Indian tribe. Patricio Ontiveros family owned the land after exploiting the tribe. It was purchased later by the Harvay Hawkins family, and then the Martha Nimocks family. In the 1920s, it was owned by Slusher's family. A bird aviary added by the Slushers around 1916 is a restored feature in Heritage Park.
