= Truck Hannah =

American baseball player (1889–1982)

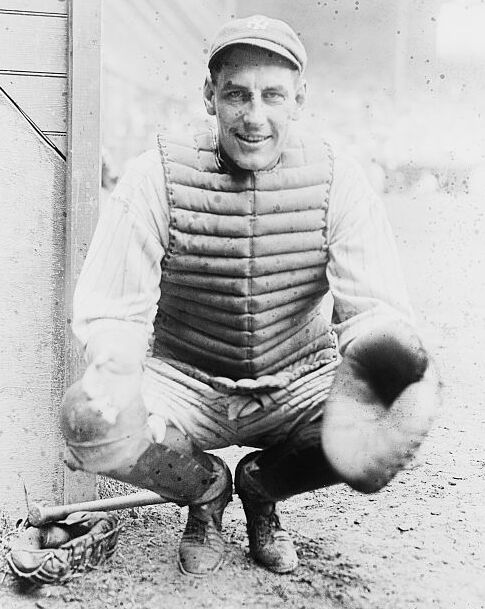
- Hannah in 1920
- Catcher
- Born: June 5, 1889; Larimore, Dakota Territory
- Died: April 27, 1982 (aged 92); Fountain Valley, California, U.S.
- Batted: Right Threw: Right

MLB debut
- April 15, 1918, for the New York Yankees

Last MLB appearance
- September 29, 1920, for the New York Yankees

MLB statistics
- Batting average: .235
- Home runs: 5
- Runs batted in: 66
- Stats at Baseball Reference

Teams
- New York Yankees (1918–1920)

James Harrison "Truck" Hannah (June 5, 1889 – April 27, 1982) was an American Major League Baseball catcher who also had a lengthy minor league career.

Hannah played three seasons with the New York Yankees (1918–1920). He had 173 career hits in 736 at bats. He also had five home runs.

He was the first Major League Baseball player born in North Dakota and would be the only one until 1930.

Hannah's minor league playing career extended from 1909, when he played for Tacoma of the Northwestern League, through 1940, when he played for Memphis of the Southern Association.

Hannah managed for seven seasons in the minor leagues, serving as player-manager of the Los Angeles Angels of the Pacific Coast League during 1937–1939. He is a member of the Pacific Coast League Hall of Fame.

Truck Hannah played himself in two Paramount films, Warming Up (1928), Paramount's first sound features (with music and sound effects only), and Fast Company (1929). He was the father of Helen Hannah Campbell (1916–2013), who was a chaperone for the Muskegon Lassies in the All-American Girls Professional Baseball League (AAGPBL).

Hannah died at his home in Fountain Valley, California on April 27, 1982 at the age of 91 of natural causes.
