= Steve Folsom =

American football player (born 1958)

No. 86, 85, 89
- Position: Tight end

Personal information
- Born: March 21, 1958 (age 68); Los Angeles, California, U.S.
- Listed height: 6 ft 5 in (1.96 m)
- Listed weight: 235 lb (107 kg)

Career information
- High school: Santa Fe (CA)
- College: Long Beach State; Utah
- NFL draft: 1981: 10th round, 261st overall pick

Career history
- Miami Dolphins (1981)*; Philadelphia Eagles (1981–1982); New York Giants (1982); Philadelphia/Baltimore Stars (1983–1985); Dallas Cowboys (1987–1990)
- * Offseason or practice squad member only

Career NFL statistics
- Receptions: 37
- Receiving yards: 349
- Touchdowns: 4
- Stats at Pro Football Reference

Steven Mark Folsom (born March 21, 1958) is an American former professional football player who was a tight end in the National Football League (NFL) for the Philadelphia Eagles and Dallas Cowboys. He also was a member of the Philadelphia Stars and Baltimore Stars of the United States Football League (USFL). He played college football for the Long Beach State 49ers and Utah Utes.

== Early life ==
Folsom attended Santa Fe High School, where he practiced basketball and football. In basketball, he helped his team win a championship title.

He accepted a football scholarship from Long Beach State University. As a freshman, he registered 6 receptions for 63 yards. He transferred after his first year, to follow his college head coach Wayne Howard to the University of Utah.

He was named a starter at tight end as a sophomore. As a senior, he had 23 receptions for 352 yards and one touchdown. He finished his three-year career in Utah with 56 receptions for 853 yards and 8 touchdowns.

He also played for the basketball team and was a backup reserve on the 1980 team that advanced to the NCAA playoffs.

== Professional career ==
=== Miami Dolphins ===
Folsom was selected by the Miami Dolphins in the tenth round (261st overall) of the 1981 NFL draft. He was waived in August.

=== Philadelphia Eagles ===
On November 25, 1981, he was signed by the Philadelphia Eagles. As a rookie, he played in 3 games on special teams. He was placed on the injured reserve list on September 6, 1982, but was released later that same month.

=== New York Giants ===
On September 13, 1982, he was signed as a free agent by the New York Giants. He was released on November 30, to make room for Rob Carpenter after he ended his contract holdout.

=== Philadelphia/Baltimore Stars ===
In 1983, he was signed by the Philadelphia Stars of the United States Football League as a free agent. The league's owners voted to move the season to the fall after the 1985 season and because the team couldn't compete with the Philadelphia Eagles, they were moved to Baltimore.

Folsom was a part of teams that reached the USFL title game three years in a row, winning in 1984 and 1985. He finished with 73 receptions for 775 yards and 7 touchdowns.

=== Dallas Cowboys ===
In 1987, he signed with the Dallas Cowboys as a free agent. He was cut on September 7 and later re-signed.

Folsom was mostly a backup blocking tight end during his time with the team, until 1988, when he started 4 games in place of an injured Doug Cosbie. The next year, he started 16 games after Cosbie left the Cowboys via Plan B free agency, posting 28 receptions (second on the team) for 265 yards (fifth on the team).

He was released on September 3, 1990. He was re-signed on December 18, to provide depth for an injured Rob Awalt. He retired after the season.

== Personal life ==
Folsom worked for a period of time as a strength and conditioning coach for the United States Ski Team.

In 2001, he took a job with Dell at the company's headquarters in Round Rock, Texas, where he remains as a global technical account manager.
