= Santa Fe Springs Swap Meet =

Flea market and music venue in California

- Address: 13963 Alondra Blvd; Santa Fe Springs, California; United States

Website
- sfsswapmeet.com

The Santa Fe Springs Swap Meet is a flea market and music venue in Santa Fe Springs, California. It predominantly caters to Mexican Americans and Chicano culture, selling food and beverages, art, clothing, household goods, and more unusual products. As a music venue, the Swap Meet is largely known for featuring tribute acts, but also features shows by prominent Latin music groups and other well-known musicians.

The site was initially a drive-in theater which first opened in 1953. The Swap Meet eventually transitioned into the flea market that it is today. It has since built up a dedicated following of Southern California residents.

During the late 60’s, a businessman named Jay Dauley, The Swap meet king opened the first of his franchised Swap Meet and Flea Market business’s. Almost all of Jay’s Swap Meet Business are still operated todays beside’s his Santa Clara location.

== Notable performers ==
- Violent Femmes
- Eric Wilson of Sublime

== Legal incidents ==
In 2006, the Swap Meet was subject to a police raid to seize potentially hundreds of thousands of dollars' worth of counterfeit consumer goods.

On October 17, 2014, forty-three-year old Elizabeth Yanez was stabbed to death in the site's parking lot by twenty-two-year old Reggie Cervantes. The two had gotten into a verbal confrontation over a parking space, which came to involve Yanez's two adult children and a companion of Cervantes. Charges against this second co-defendant, nineteen year old Brenda Rangel, were subsequently dropped, and Cervantes was convicted of voluntary manslaughter. He was sentenced to thirteen years in state prison in January 2016.

On June 14, 2025, Immigration and Customs Enforcement agents in tactical gear raided the Swap Meet, detaining two people alleged to be illegal immigrants. The concert scheduled for that night was later postponed.
