= Santa Fe High School (California) =

Public high school in California, United States

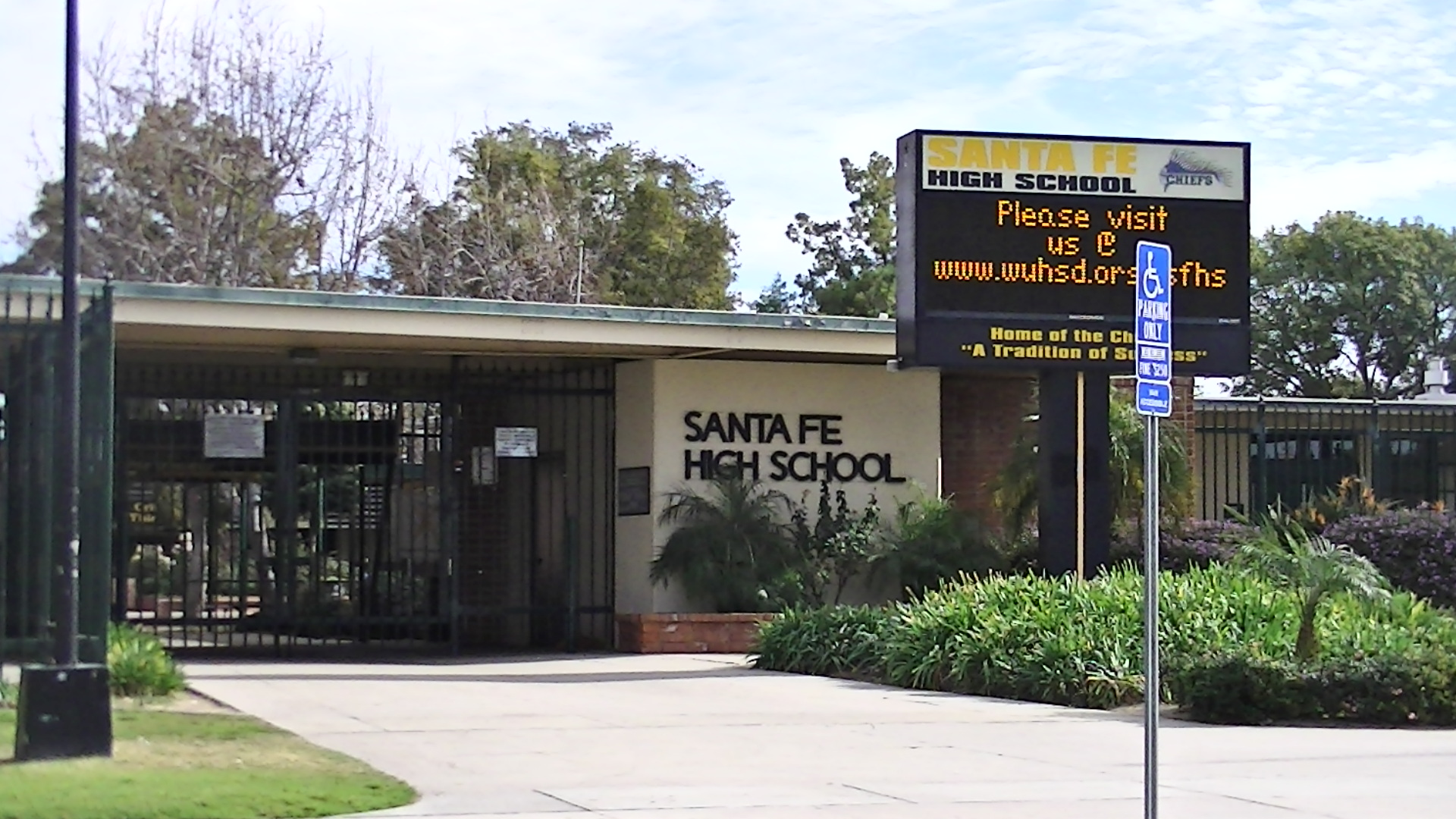
- Santa Fe High School entrance

Location
- 10400 Orr and Day Road; Santa Fe Springs, California 90670; United States; 33°56′24″N 118°5′24″W

Information
- Type: Public High School
- Established: 1954
- School district: Whittier Union High School District
- NCES School ID: 064248006954
- Principal: Craig Campbell
- Teaching staff: 78.84 (FTE)
- Grades: 9–12
- Enrollment: 1,880 (2023–2024)
- Student to teacher ratio: 23.85
- Colors: Black; Gold
- Nickname: Sentinels
- Website: School website

Santa Fe High School is a public high school located in Santa Fe Springs, California. The school has an enrollment of approximately 3,000 students and was founded in 1954 as a part of the Whittier Union High School District. It serves students in grades 9–12 in the cities of Santa Fe Springs, Norwalk, Downey, and Whittier.

Santa Fe was named a California Distinguished School in 2007. For the 2009-2010 school year, Santa Fe met its Federal AYP; the school's API score was 786 for that same year. Santa Fe's API Score for the 2010-2011 school year was 803, placing the school within the proficient range starting at 800.

== Athletics ==
Santa Fe High School's mascot is the Sentinel (formerly the Chief), and the school colors are Black and Gold. Sports offered include wrestling, football, basketball, baseball, track, soccer, tennis, water polo, swimming, softball, volleyball, cross-country, cheerleading, and golf.

== Notable alumni ==
- Eric Bellinger - American singer, songwriter, and record producer
- Joey Davis - former amateur wrestler and current mixed martial artist for Bellator MMA
- Joe Gibbs - former head coach of the Washington Redskins
- Steve Folsom - former NFL tight end for the Dallas Cowboys and Philadelphia Eagles
- Tammy Jernigan - U.S. astronaut
- Mark Kotsay - former MLB outfielder who last played for the San Diego Padres
- Laura Berg - Olympic softball player and Head Coach for the Oregon State University Softball Team
- Rod Barajas - former MLB catcher who last played for the Pittsburgh Pirates
- Wayne Rainey - World Champion motorcycle race
