= Whittier Union High School District =

School district in California

Address
- 9401 South Painter Avenue Whittier, California, 90605-2798; United States

District information
- Type: Public
- Grades: 9–12
- Established: 1900
- NCES District ID: 0642480

Students and staff
- Students: 9,846 (2026–2027)
- Teachers: 441.99 (on an FTE basis)
- Staff: 690.29 (on an FTE basis)
- Student–teacher ratio: 22.28:1

Other information
- Website: www.wuhsd.org

Whittier Union High School District is a California high school district in Los Angeles County, California, headquartered in Whittier. The union high school district was formed in 1900 and is currently composed of five comprehensive high schools, two alternative high schools, and an adult education center. Combined, these schools serve over 13,000 students. The school district is overseen by its current Superintendent, Dr. Monica Oviedo. The Board of Trustees is composed of five members, elected by trustee areas. The elections are currently held on a Tuesday after the first Monday in November of even-numbered years.

The district includes all of Rose Hills and West Whittier-Los Nietos, most of Whittier and South Whittier, and parts of the following: City of Industry, Downey, East Whittier, La Habra Heights, La Mirada, Norwalk, Pico Rivera, and Santa Fe Springs.

== Schools ==
=== High schools ===
- Whittier High School, founded in 1900 and located in Whittier (Uptown)
- California High School, founded in 1953 and located in South Whittier
- Santa Fe High School, founded in 1955 and located in Santa Fe Springs
- Pioneer High School, founded in 1959 and located in West Whittier
- La Serna High School, founded in 1961 and located in Whittier (Friendly Hills)

=== Alternative Education ===
- Frontier High School, continuation
- Sierra Vista High School, alternative/independent study
- Whittier Adult School

=== Closed schools ===
- Monte Vista High School, South Whittier, opened 1964, closed 1979
- Sierra High School, Whittier, opened 1957, closed 1979

== Feeder districts ==
- East Whittier City School District in East Whittier
- Little Lake City School District in Santa Fe Springs
- Los Nietos School District in Los Nietos
- South Whittier School District in South Whittier
- Whittier City School District in Whittier

== See also ==
- List of school districts in California
- List of high schools in Los Angeles County, California
