= West Whittier-Los Nietos, California =

- Census-designated place
- Interactive map of West Whittier-Los Nietos, California
- Location in California Location in the United States
- Coordinates: 33°58′34″N 118°4′8″W
- Country: United States
- State: California
- County: Los Angeles

Area
  - Total: 2.520 sq mi (6.528 km^{2})
  - Land: 2.520 sq mi (6.528 km^{2})
  - Water: 0 sq mi (0 km^{2}) 0%

Population (2020)
  - Total: 25,325
  - Density: 10,050/sq mi (3,879/km^{2})
- Time zone: UTC-8 (PST)
  - Summer (DST): UTC-7 (PDT)
- ZIP code: 90606
- Area code: 562
- FIPS code: 06-84921
- GNIS feature ID: 2409570

West Whittier-Los Nietos is a census-designated place (CDP) in Los Angeles County, California, United States, near the San Gabriel River and the San Gabriel River (I-605) Freeway. The population was 25,325 at the 2020 census, down from 25,540 at the 2010 census. The census area consists of separate unincorporated communities of Los Nietos (Spanish for "the grandchildren") and West Whittier.

== Geography ==
West Whittier-Los Nietos is located at 33°58′34″N 118°4′8″W (33.976113, -118.069000), or about three miles (5 km) northwest of Whittier.

According to the United States Census Bureau, the CDP has a total area of 2.5 square miles (6.5 km^{2}), all land.

== Demographics ==
Historical population
Census	Pop.	Note	%±
1970	20,845		—
1980	21,001		0.7%
1990	24,164		15.1%
2000	25,129		4.0%
2010	25,540		1.6%
2020	25,325		−0.8%
U.S. Decennial Census; 1860–1870 1880-1890; 1900 1910 1920; 1930 1940 1950; 1960 1970 1980; 1990 2000 2010; 2020

West Whittier-Los Nietos first appeared as an unincorporated place in the 1970 U.S. census; and as a census designated place in the 1980 United States census.

=== Racial and ethnic composition ===
West Whittier-Los Nietos CDP, California – Racial and ethnic composition Note: the US Census treats Hispanic/Latino as an ethnic category. This table excludes Latinos from the racial categories and assigns them to a separate category. Hispanics/Latinos may be of any race.
Race / Ethnicity (NH = Non-Hispanic)	Pop 2000	Pop 2010	Pop 2020	% 2000	% 2010	% 2020
White alone (NH)	3,488	2,369	1,838	13.88%	9.28%	7.26%
Black or African American alone (NH)	87	177	201	0.35%	0.69%	0.79%
Native American or Alaska Native alone (NH)	65	82	85	0.26%	0.32%	0.34%
Asian alone (NH)	376	345	478	1.50%	1.35%	1.89%
Native Hawaiian or Pacific Islander alone (NH)	30	30	40	0.12%	0.12%	0.16%
Other race alone (NH)	24	61	117	0.10%	0.24%	0.46%
Mixed race or Multiracial (NH)	185	107	196	0.74%	0.42%	0.77%
Hispanic or Latino (any race)	20,874	22,369	22,370	83.07%	87.58%	88.33%
Total	25,129	25,540	25,325	100.00%	100.00%	100.00%

=== 2020 census ===
As of the 2020 census, West Whittier-Los Nietos had a population of 25,325 and a population density of 10,049.6 inhabitants per square mile (3,880.2/km^{2}). The median age was 37.9 years; 21.8% were under 18, 9.9% were aged 18 to 24, 27.7% were aged 25 to 44, 25.2% were aged 45 to 64, and 15.3% were 65 years of age or older. For every 100 females, there were 94.6 males, and for every 100 females age 18 and over there were 92.7 males age 18 and over.

100.0% of residents lived in urban areas, while 0.0% lived in rural areas.

The census reported that 99.2% of the population lived in households, 0.5% lived in non-institutionalized group quarters, and 0.2% were institutionalized.

There were 6,957 households, of which 40.4% had children under the age of 18 living in them. 51.7% were married-couple households, 7.2% were cohabiting couple households, 27.1% had a female householder with no partner present, and 14.0% had a male householder with no partner present. About 12.9% of all households were made up of individuals and 7.2% had someone living alone who was 65 years of age or older. The average household size was 3.61. There were 5,789 families (83.2% of all households).

There were 7,089 housing units at an average density of 2,813.1 units per square mile (1,086.1 units/km^{2}), of which 6,957 (98.1%) were occupied. Of these, 72.5% were owner-occupied, and 27.5% were occupied by renters. The homeowner vacancy rate was 0.4% and the rental vacancy rate was 2.9%.

Racial composition as of the 2020 census
Race	Number	Percent
White	6,378	25.2%
Black or African American	269	1.1%
American Indian and Alaska Native	738	2.9%
Asian	571	2.3%
Native Hawaiian and Other Pacific Islander	73	0.3%
Some other race	10,738	42.4%
Two or more races	6,558	25.9%
Hispanic or Latino (of any race)	22,370	88.3%

=== 2010 census ===
At the 2010 census West Whittier-Los Nietos had a population of 25,540. The population density was 10,138.5 inhabitants per square mile (3,914.5/km^{2}). The racial makeup of West Whittier-Los Nietos was 15,170 (59.4%) White (9.3% Non-Hispanic White), 254 (1.0%) African American, 372 (1.5%) Native American, 393 (1.5%) Asian, 43 (0.2%) Pacific Islander, 8,404 (32.9%) from other races, and 904 (3.5%) from two or more races. Hispanic or Latino of any race were 22,369 persons (87.6%).

The census reported that 25,446 people (99.6% of the population) lived in households, 44 (0.2%) lived in non-institutionalized group quarters, and 50 (0.2%) were institutionalized.

There were 6,698 households, 3,282 (49.0%) had children under the age of 18 living in them, 3,684 (55.0%) were opposite-sex married couples living together, 1,319 (19.7%) had a female householder with no husband present, 598 (8.9%) had a male householder with no wife present. There were 427 (6.4%) unmarried opposite-sex partnerships, and 49 (0.7%) same-sex married couples or partnerships. 843 households (12.6%) were one person and 466 (7.0%) had someone living alone who was 65 or older. The average household size was 3.80. There were 5,601 families (83.6% of households); the average family size was 4.07.

The age distribution was 6,901 people (27.0%) under the age of 18, 2,742 people (10.7%) aged 18 to 24, 7,220 people (28.3%) aged 25 to 44, 5,825 people (22.8%) aged 45 to 64, and 2,852 people (11.2%) who were 65 or older. The median age was 33.7 years. For every 100 females, there were 97.0 males. For every 100 females age 18 and over, there were 93.5 males.

There were 6,923 housing units at an average density of 2,748.2 per square mile, of the occupied units 4,897 (73.1%) were owner-occupied and 1,801 (26.9%) were rented. The homeowner vacancy rate was 1.0%; the rental vacancy rate was 5.5%. 18,510 people (72.5% of the population) lived in owner-occupied housing units and 6,936 people (27.2%) lived in rental housing units.

According to the 2010 United States Census, West Whittier-Los Nietos had a median household income of $60,525, with 9.4% of the population living below the federal poverty line.

=== 2023 American Community Survey ===
In 2023, the US Census Bureau estimated that the median household income was $101,138, and the per capita income was $30,896. About 6.4% of families and 10.5% of the population were below the poverty line.

== History ==
Los Nietos is among the oldest communities in Southern California. The Los Nietos School District was established in 1861 and a Methodist circuit centered on the city was founded in 1867.

The community grew up around the Rancho Los Nietos and its constituent rancho Rancho Santa Gertrudes. Los Nietos was listed as a township in the 1860 and 1870 census, with its area comprising most of the old Rancho Los Nietos, thereby stretching from the Puente Hills south to Long Beach. Census records report a population of 605 in 1860 and 1,544 in 1870.

From the 1950s to the 1980s the community was served by the Whittier Downs Shopping Center.

== Notable people ==
Herschel K. Mitchell (1913–2000), biochemist and geneticist, was born in Los Nietos

== Education ==
The area is served by the Whittier Union High School District, primarily Pioneer High. For elementary school, the area is served by the Los Nietos School District and the Whittier City School District. Two middle schools are in the area (Katherine Edwards and Los Nietos) as are several elementary schools (Aeolian, Nelson, Phelan, Sorensen and West Whittier)

== Politics ==
In the state legislature West Whittier-Los Nietos is located in the 30th Senate District, represented by Democrat Bob Archuleta, and in the 56th Assembly District, represented by Democrat Lisa Calderon. Federally, West Whittier-Los Nietos is located in California's 38th congressional district, which is represented by Democrat Linda Sánchez.

The Los Angeles County Sheriff's Department operates the Pico Rivera Station in Pico Rivera, serving West Whittier.
