= East Whittier City School District =

School district in California

Address
- 14535 Whittier Boulevard Whittier, California, 90605; United States

District information
- Type: Public
- Grades: K–8
- NCES District ID: 0611850

Students and staff
- Students: 8,230 (2020–2021)
- Teachers: 343.11 (FTE)
- Staff: 386.35 (FTE)
- Student–teacher ratio: 23.99:1

Other information
- Website: www.ewcsd.org

East Whittier City School District is a school district based in Whittier, California, United States.

EWCSD serves a large portion of the city of Whittier, and operates Elementary and Middle schools. The city's secondary schools are encompassed by the Whittier Union High School District.

== Schools ==
=== Intermediate schools ===
- East Whittier Middle School
- Granada Middle School
- Hillview Middle School

=== Elementary schools ===
- Ceres Elementary School
- Evergreen Elementary School
- La Colima Elementary School
- Laurel Elementary School
- Leffingwell Elementary School
- Mulberry Elementary School
- Murphy Ranch Elementary School
- Ocean View Elementary School
- Orchard Dale Academy
- Scott Avenue Elementary School
  - There are 556 student attending Scott Ave. 5% are Hispanic, 89% are white, 2% are African American, 2% are Asian, 2% are Filipino, less than one percent each of Pacific Islander and Alaska Native. The ADA of the school is $6,642.
