= Santa Fe Springs, California =

City in California, United States

- City
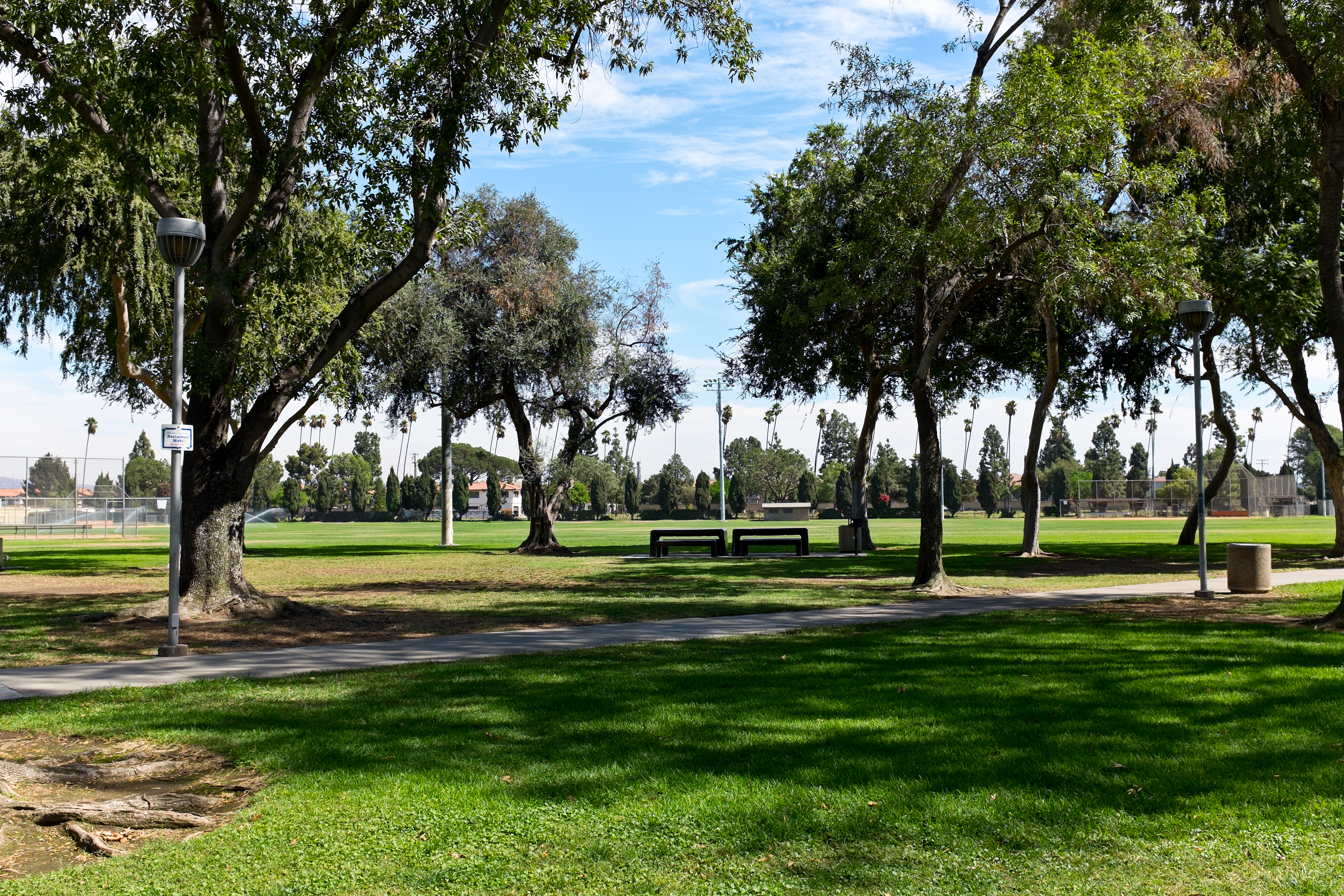
- Little Lake Park, Santa Fe Springs

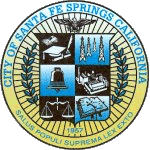
- Seal
- Interactive map of Santa Fe Springs, California
- Location in the United States
- Coordinates: 33°56′15″N 118°4′2″W
- Country: United States
- State: California
- County: Los Angeles
- Incorporated: May 15, 1957

Government
  - Mayor: William K. Rounds
  - Mayor Pro Tem: Joe Angel Zamora
  - City Council: Juanita Martin; Annette Rodriguez; John M. Mora
  - City Manager: René Bobadilla

Area
  - Total: 8.90 sq mi (23.05 km^{2})
  - Land: 8.86 sq mi (22.95 km^{2})
  - Water: 0.039 sq mi (0.10 km^{2}) 0.44%
- Elevation: 135 ft (41 m)

Population (2020)
  - Total: 19,219
  - Density: 2,169/sq mi (837.4/km^{2})
- Time zone: UTC−8 (Pacific)
  - Summer (DST): UTC−7 (PDT)
- ZIP Codes: 90605, 90670, 90671
- Area code: 562
- FIPS code: 06-69154
- GNIS feature ID: 1661404
- Website: www.santafesprings.gov

Santa Fe Springs (Santa Fe, Spanish for "Holy Faith") is a city in Los Angeles County, California, United States. It is one of the Gateway Cities of southeast Los Angeles County. The population was 19,219 at the 2020 census, up from 16,223 at the 2010 census.

== Etymology ==
Santa Fe Springs, which is Spanish for "holy faith," was first applied to mineral springs purchased by the Atchison, Topeka and Santa Fe Railway from Dr. James E. Fulton in 1886.

== History ==
Junípero Serra started some missions in this area, especially the San Gabriel mission. By 1806, the natives, first called Gabrieleños and then Sejats, were forced into labor to build the mission.

Corporal José Manuel Nieto, then 65 years old, petitioned Pedro Fages as the Governor for a small piece of land. In 1789, Fagas received official permission for the grant. Nieto's was one of the largest at 300,000 acres (1,200 km^{2}) , from the Pacific Ocean to the Puente Hills. This became known as the "Rancho La Zanja", to which he moved with his wife Teresa and his son, Juan José. This area soon became a large cattle empire, and later would be the Santa Fe Springs' area.

Dr. James E. Fulton came to the area as an agent for the San Gertrudes Land Company in 1871. He found a sulfur spring when drilling a well and developed it by 1874 into a health spa with a 2-story sanitarium-hotel called Fulton's Sulfur Wells in the area around what today would be Heritage Park. It included a windmill to draw water into the pool for bathers. In the beginning he had about 400 patients there annually. Later, in 1886, the Atchison, Topeka & Santa Fe Railway purchased land from Fulton to run the train line from Los Angeles to San Diego, changing the town since now there was rail transportation.

In 1907, the Union Oil Company of California began drilling near the intersection of Norwalk Blvd. and Telegraph Road, locally known as "Four Corners," with the spudding in of the Meyer No. 1 well. That well, and a subsequent one, failed. In 1921 the Union-Bell well blew in as a 2,500-barrel gusher and set off an oil rush by major oil companies and fly-by-night producers. Within a year the Santa Fe Springs oil field was considered one of the richest pools in petroleum history. Santa Fe Springs became a promoters' paradise. Prospective investors were bused into the field, served a free lunch in circus tents, and told stories about the fortunes made in oil. In 1923 the state legislature limited the amount of stock that could be sold in a well.

In the 1920s the field produced as much as 345,000 barrels daily, exceeding production at Signal Hill and Huntington Beach. Production slowed as the decade went on, and by 1928 the Wilshire Oil Company was drilling in deep sand levels. Production levels dropped each year from then on, but by 1938 the field had yielded a total of more than 440,000,000 barrels of oil.

Santa Fe Springs is the birthplace of the Shelby Cobra. In 1962 Carroll Shelby set up shop in Dean Moon's speed shop in Santa Fe Springs. Shelby had AC Cars of Surrey, England ship cars without a motor or drive train to the Santa Fe shop. Shelby shoe-horned a 260-cubic-inch V8 into the tiny, lightweight British roadster and the Cobra was born: a British sports car with American hot rod power.

== Geography ==
Santa Fe Springs is located at 33°56′15″N 118°04′02″W.

According to the United States Census Bureau, the city has a total area of 8.9 square miles (23 km^{2}), of which 8.9 square miles (23 km^{2}) is land and 0.04 square miles (0.10 km^{2}) (0.45%) is water.

It is bordered by the unincorporated West Whittier-Los Nietos to the north, Pico Rivera to the northwest, Downey to the west, Norwalk to the southwest, Cerritos to the south, La Mirada and the unincorporated South Whittier to the east, and Whittier to the northeast.

== Demographics ==
Historical population
Census	Pop.	Note	%±
1960	16,342		—
1970	14,750		−9.7%
1980	14,520		−1.6%
1990	15,520		6.9%
2000	17,438		12.4%
2010	16,223		−7.0%
2020	19,219		18.5%
U.S. Decennial Census; 1860–1870 1880–1890; 1900 1910 1920; 1930 1940 1950; 1960 1970 1980; 1990 2000 2010; 2020

Santa Fe Springs first appeared as a city in the 1960 U.S. census as part of the Whittier census county division.

=== Racial and ethnic composition ===
Santa Fe Springs city, California – Racial and ethnic composition Note: the US Census treats Hispanic/Latino as an ethnic category. This table excludes Latinos from the racial categories and assigns them to a separate category. Hispanics/Latinos may be of any race.
Race / Ethnicity (NH = Non-Hispanic)	Pop 1980	Pop 1990	Pop 2000	Pop 2010	Pop 2020	% 1980	% 1990	% 2000	% 2010	% 2020
White alone (NH)	5,352	4,054	3,354	1,927	1,896	36.86%	26.12%	19.23%	11.88%	9.87%
Black or African American alone (NH)	24	252	645	305	618	0.17%	1.62%	3.70%	1.88%	3.22%
Native American or Alaska Native alone (NH)	118	63	79	65	40	0.81%	0.41%	0.45%	0.40%	0.21%
Asian alone (NH)	269	642	652	624	1,618	1.85%	4.14%	3.74%	3.85%	8.42%
Native Hawaiian or Pacific Islander alone (NH)	269	642	29	20	46	1.85%	4.14%	0.17%	0.12%	0.24%
Other race alone (NH)	11	40	15	26	73	0.08%	0.28%	0.09%	0.16%	0.38%
Mixed race or Multiracial (NH)	x	x	217	119	302	x	x	1.24%	0.73%	1.57%
Hispanic or Latino (any race)	8,746	10,456	12,447	13,137	14,626	60.23%	67.37%	71.38%	80.98%	76.10%
Total	14,520	15,520	17,438	16,223	19,219	100.00%	100.00%	100.00%	100.00%	100.00%

=== 2020 census ===
As of the 2020 census, Santa Fe Springs had a population of 19,219. The median age was 39.1 years. 20.7% of residents were under the age of 18 and 16.2% were 65 years of age or older. For every 100 females there were 91.8 males, and for every 100 females age 18 and over there were 89.8 males.

Of residents, 100.0% lived in urban areas, while 0.0% lived in rural areas.

There were 5,883 households in Santa Fe Springs, of which 38.1% had children under the age of 18 living in them. Of all households, 45.8% were married-couple households, 16.7% were households with a male householder and no spouse or partner present, and 30.7% were households with a female householder and no spouse or partner present. About 20.4% of all households were made up of individuals and 11.9% had someone living alone who was 65 years of age or older.

There were 6,015 housing units, of which 2.2% were vacant. The homeowner vacancy rate was 0.3% and the rental vacancy rate was 3.1%.

=== 2010 census ===
At the 2010 census Santa Fe Springs had a population of 16,223. The population density was 1,819.9 inhabitants per square mile (702.7/km^{2}). The racial makeup of Santa Fe Springs was (11.6%) White, (2.3%) African American, 233 (1.4%) Native American, 677 (4.2%) Asian, (4.2%) from two or more races. Hispanic or Latino of any race were 13,137 persons (81.0%).

The census reported that 16,030 people (98.8% of the population) lived in households, 85 (0.5%) lived in non-institutionalized group quarters, and 108 (0.7%) were institutionalized.

There were 4,747 households, 2,093 (44.1%) had children under the age of 18 living in them, 2,354 (49.6%) were opposite-sex married couples living together, 965 (20.3%) had a female householder with no husband present, 368 (7.8%) had a male householder with no wife present. There were 286 (6.0%) unmarried opposite-sex partnerships, and 26 (0.5%) same-sex married couples or partnerships. 894 households (18.8%) were one person and 526 (11.1%) had someone living alone who was 65 or older. The average household size was 3.38. There were 3,687 families (77.7% of households); the average family size was 3.84.

The age distribution was 4,286 people (26.4%) under the age of 18, 1,770 people (10.9%) aged 18 to 24, 4,272 people (26.3%) aged 25 to 44, 3,735 people (23.0%) aged 45 to 64, and 2,160 people (13.3%) who were 65 or older. The median age was 35.3 years. For every 100 females, there were 93.0 males. For every 100 females age 18 and over, there were 90.0 males.

There were 4,976 housing units at an average density of 558.2 per square mile, of the occupied units 2,894 (61.0%) were owner-occupied and 1,853 (39.0%) were rented. The homeowner vacancy rate was 2.1%; the rental vacancy rate was 5.5%. 10,323 people (63.6% of the population) lived in owner-occupied housing units and 5,707 people (35.2%) lived in rental housing units.

According to the 2010 United States Census, Santa Fe Springs had a median household income of $54,081, with 9.1% of the population living below the federal poverty line.

=== 2000 census ===
At the 2000 census there were 17,438 people in 4,834 households, including 3,780 families, in the city. The population density was 1,992.0 inhabitants per square mile (769.1/km^{2}). There were 4,933 housing units at an average density of 563.5 per square mile (217.6/km^{2}). The racial makeup of the city was 51.22% White, 3.89% African American, 1.43% Native American, 3.95% Asian, 0.20% Pacific Islander, 34.99% from other races, and 4.31% from two or more races. Hispanic or Latino of any race were 71.38%.

As of 2000, speakers of Spanish as their first language accounted for 51.63% of residents, while English was spoken by 46.07%, Tagalog was spoken by 1.05%, Vietnamese was spoken by 0.68%, Korean was spoken by 0.37%, French by 0.17% of the population.

Of the 4,834 households 38.3% had children under the age of 18 living with them, 54.0% were married couples living together, 18.1% had a female householder with no husband present, and 21.8% were non-families. 18.3% of households were one person and 11.2% were one person aged 65 or older. The average household size was 3.35 and the average family size was 3.82.

The age distribution was 29.1% under the age of 18, 9.4% from 18 to 24, 29.7% from 25 to 44, 19.1% from 45 to 64, and 12.8% 65 or older. The median age was 33 years. For every 100 females, there were 100.1 males. For every 100 females age 18 and over, there were 97.4 males.

The median household income was $44,540 and the median family income was $49,867. Males had a median income of $33,413 versus $27,279 for females. The per capita income for the city was $14,547. About 8.0% of families and 12.5% of the population were below the poverty line, including 13.9% of those under age 18 and 7.6% of those age 65 or over.

== Government ==
United States presidential election results for Santa Fe Springs, California
Year	Republican		Democratic		Third party(ies)	
Year	No.	%	No.	%	No.	%
2000	1,196	27.42%	3,064	70.24%	102	2.34%
2004	2,047	36.10%	3,546	62.53%	78	1.38%
2008	1,800	28.84%	4,289	68.71%	153	2.45%
2012	1,531	26.43%	4,141	71.48%	121	2.09%
2016	1,547	22.52%	4,927	71.73%	395	5.75%
2020	2,576	29.82%	5,849	67.71%	213	2.47%
2024	2,752	37.05%	4,435	59.71%	240	3.23%

In the California State Legislature, Santa Fe Springs is in the 30th senatorial district, represented by Democrat Bob Archuleta, and in the 64th Assembly district, represented by Democrat Blanca Pacheco.

In the United States House of Representatives, Santa Fe Springs is in California's 38th congressional district, represented by Democrat Linda Sánchez.

=== Law enforcement ===
Police services for the city are contracted by the Whittier Police Department, based at the Santa Fe Springs Police Services Center sub-station. The police services center is located on Telegraph Road.

=== Fire ===
The Santa Fe Springs Department of Fire and Rescue provides fire protection and rescue services.

=== Health care ===
The Department of Veterans Affairs operates the Santa Fe Springs VA Clinic, an outpatient facility. The nearest general hospital, Norwalk Community Hospital, is a non-profit facility located in the city of Norwalk.

== Economy ==
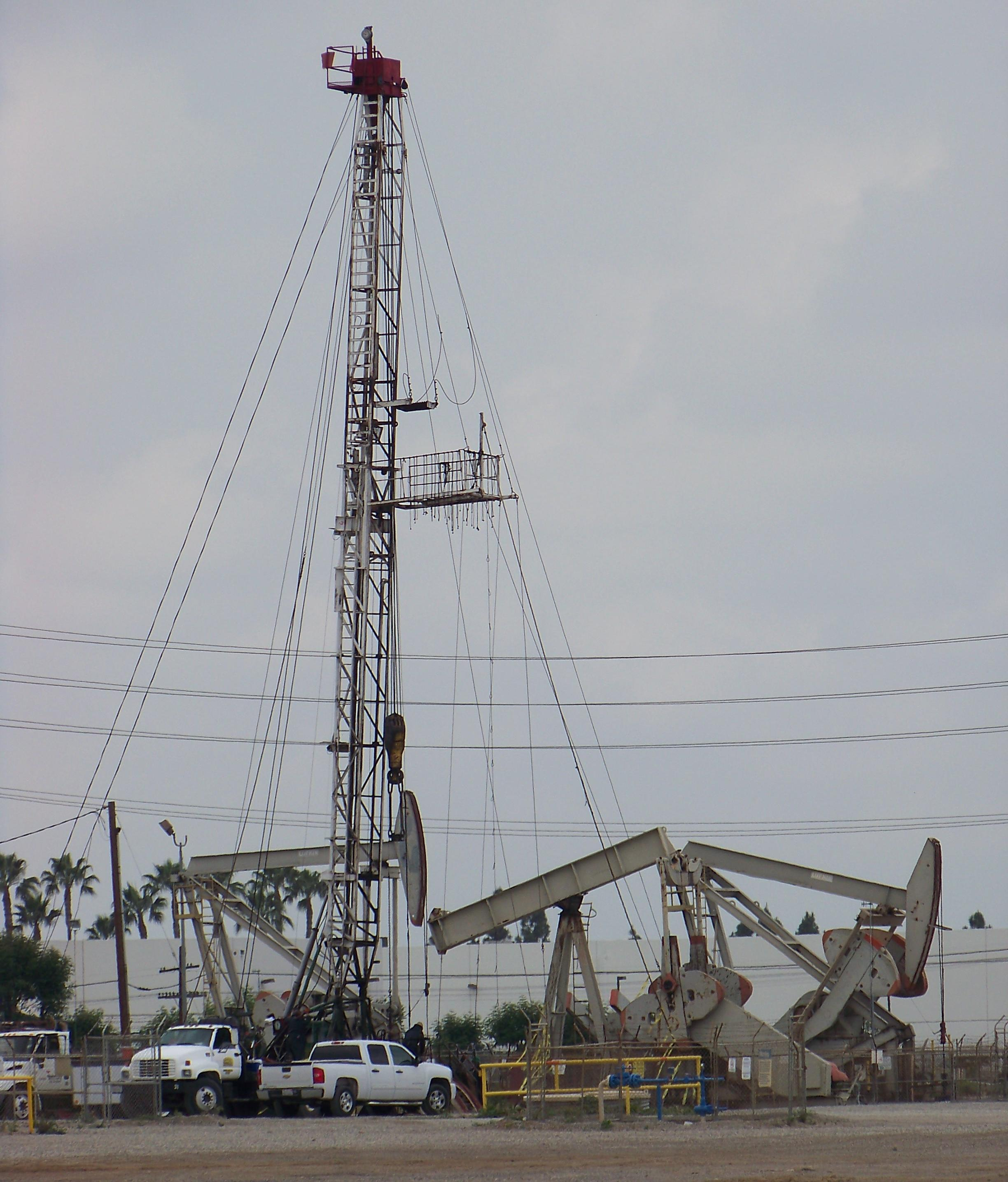
Oil production continues at Santa Fe Springs. Here a well is being reworked (2012)

The economy of Santa Fe Springs is largely made up of light industry, unlike its neighboring cities. This is evident when looking at satellite and aerial photography, where the majority of the city is distinguishable from its neighboring cities, due to the density of very large, industrial and manufacturing facilities.

Santa Fe Springs is home to Egge Machine Company, supplier of Cadillac engine parts for custom cars and hot rods. It is also home to U.S. Aerospace, a publicly traded aerospace and defense contractor for the United States Department of Defense and the United States Air Force, Lockheed Martin Corporation, The Boeing Company, L-3 Communications Holdings, the Middle River Aircraft Systems subsidiary of General Electric Company, and other aircraft manufacturers, aerospace companies, and defense contractors. Other companies based in Santa Fe Springs include Fuji Food.

The Hathaway Ranch Museum in Santa Fe Springs houses an extensive collection of early ranching and farming equipment, as well as oil field machinery. The museum traces five generations of the Hathaway family and is a reflection of the economic transition of the region.

=== Retail ===
Santa Fe Springs was, in the past, home to two regional malls and one open-air shopping center anchored by department stores. These have been converted to open-air shopping centers anchored by supermarkets and discount stores. It is also home to the Santa Fe Springs Swap Meet, known as a flea market and music venue.

=== Top employers ===
According to the city's 2020 Comprehensive Annual Financial Report, the top employers in the city are:

#	Employer	# of Employees
1	McMaster-Carr	706
2	Vans	472
3	Southern Glazer's Wine and Spirits	389
4	Genesis Logistics/7-Eleven Distribution	387
5	Bumble Bee Foods	325
6	FedEx Ground	324
7	Shaw Industries	317
8	Walmart	308
9	Wismettac Asian Foods	298
10	Phillips Industries	277

== Transportation ==
Santa Fe Springs is served by Metrolink from its Norwalk/Santa Fe Springs station. Metro Local and Norwalk Transit provide local bus service.

Interstate 5 and Interstate 605 have exits in Santa Fe Springs.

== Education ==
The northern portion of Santa Fe Springs is served by the Little Lake City, Los Nietos and South Whittier School Districts and the Whittier Union High School District, while the southern portion is divided between the ABC and Norwalk-La Mirada Unified School Districts.

== Sections ==
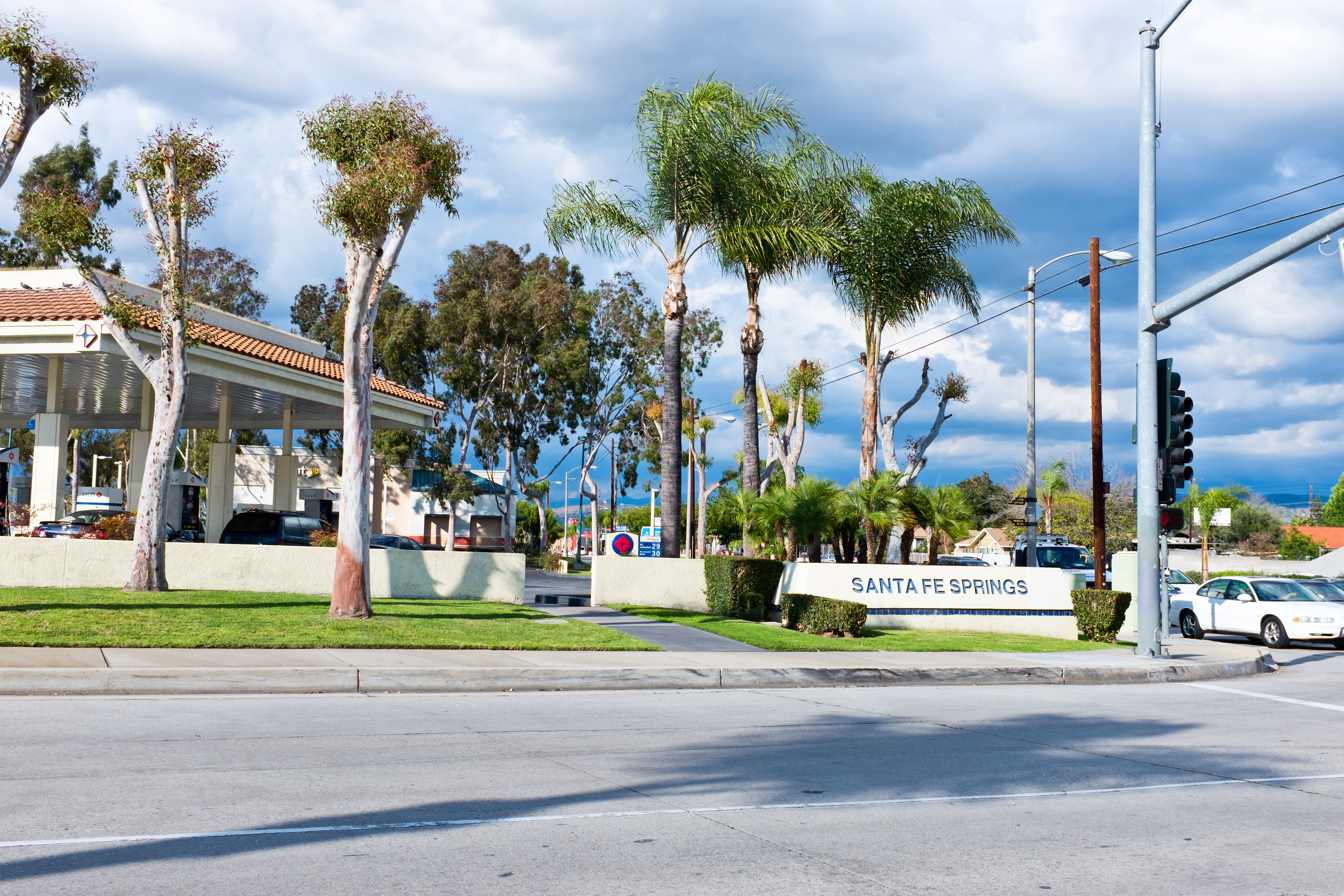
Carmenita area of Santa Fe Springs

- Carmenita

== Sister cities ==
- Navojoa, Sonora, Mexico
- Santa Fe, Argentina
- Tirschenreuth, Bavaria, Germany

== Notable people ==
- Margaret F. Slusher (1879–1971), American businesswoman
