= California High School (Whittier, California) =

Location
- 9800 South Mills Avenue; South Whittier, California 90604; United States
- Coordinates: 33.94398°N 118.02393°W

Information
- Type: Public high school
- Established: 1954
- School district: Whittier Union High School District
- Principal: Shana Jones
- Teaching staff: 101.40 (FTE)
- Grades: 9–12
- Enrollment: 2,250 (2024-25)
- Student to teacher ratio: 27.68
- Colors: Navy and gold
- Mascot: Joe Condor
- Nickname: Cal Hi
- Yearbook: Talon
- Website: chs.wuhsd.org

California High School (CHS) is a public high school in South Whittier, California and belongs to the Whittier Union High School District.

"Calhi", as it is known, is home to the Condors, with around 2,250 students currently attending. The mascot is the condor and the school colors are navy and gold. The campus is located outside the city limits of Whittier in unincorporated South Whittier.

Cal Hi has been recently honored as a California Distinguished School, and is highly praised for its academies. It also offers a Latin program. Many sports are offered, such as golf, soccer, tennis, water polo, swimming, softball, baseball, volleyball, cross-country, wrestling, track, cheerleading and football. The band has also won many commendations and awards, including sweepstakes at the local Band Jam competition 4 years running under the direction of Doug Nordquist (2004–2006), and has ranked 6th in the SCSBOA Marching Band Championship Competition!

== Academies ==
These three-year programs teach students about their chosen course of study during their Sophomore, Junior, and Senior year.

- Architecture & Engineering (A&E)
- Automotive Academy
- Business Academy
- Culinary Academy
- Health Academy
- Puente Program (four-year program)
- Scholar's Academy (four-year program)

== Notable alumni ==
- Anthony Reyes – Major League Baseball pitcher. Currently in the minors with the Cleveland Indians. Pitched and won Game 1 of the 2006 World Series with the St. Louis Cardinals.
- Nicolas Grigsby – NFL running back for the Miami Dolphins, Raiders, and Tampa Bay Buccaneers.
- Craig McCracken – Director/Writer/Cartoonist of The Powerpuff Girls, Foster's Home for Imaginary Friends, Wander Over Yonder, and Kid Cosmic.
- Anthony Rendon – Representative of California's 63rd District, Speaker of the California State Assembly.
- Jim Vellone – NFL Offensive Lineman for Minnesota Vikings.
- Lorna Patterson is a retired American film, stage and television actress. As an actress, her best-known roles were as Randy, the singing stewardess, in Airplane!, and as the lead in the television series Private Benjamin.
- Kalev Mark Kostabi (born November 27, 1960) is an American painter, sculptor and composer.
- Kerry Wendell Thornley – American author.
- Carl Cheffers– NFL Referee.
- Brittany Spencer– NBA/ NFL Cheerleader with Lakers and Rams, respectively.
