= Whittier City School District =

School district in California

Address
- 7211 South Whittier Avenue Whittier, California, 90602; United States

District information
- Type: Public
- Grades: K–8
- NCES District ID: 0642450

Students and staff
- Students: 5,836 (2020–2021)
- Teachers: 249.83 (FTE)
- Staff: 358.92 (FTE)
- Student–teacher ratio: 23.36:1

Other information
- Website: www.whittiercity.net

The Whittier City School District (also known as Whittier City Elementary School District and WCSD) is a K-8 school district in Whittier, California. It serves students. It was originally founded in 1898, the same year the city of Whittier was incorporated. It originally served students from Uptown Whittier, but expanded to unincorporated West and North Whittier in 1947 when it consolidated with the West Whittier (formerly Pico) and Mill School Districts.

The Whittier City School District contains nine elementary schools and two middle schools, and approximately 5,400 students. Its superintendent is Dr. Brad Mason.

== Middle Schools ==
- Walter F. Dexter Middle School, Whittier
- Katherine Edwards STEAM and Dual Immersion Academy, West Whittier

== Elementary schools ==
- Wallen L. Andrews School (K-8), North Whittier
- Lou Henry Hoover Elementary School, Uptown Whittier
- Lydia Jackson Elementary School, Whittier
- Mill Science and Technology Academy, Rose Hills
- Longfellow Elementary School, Whittier
- Orange Grove Elementary School, Whittier
- Daniel Phelan Language Academy, West Whittier
- Christian Sorensen Science Academy, West Whittier
- West Whittier Elementary School

== Closed schools ==
- Bailey Street School, Uptown Whittier
- Evergreen School
- Franklin Elementary School, West Whittier
- Lincoln Elementary School, Uptown Whittier
- John Muir Junior High School
- William Penn Elementary School, Uptown Whittier
- Washington Elementary School, West Whittier
- Whittier Avenue School, Whittier
