= Standard Oil Gasoline Station =

Standard Oil was an integrated oil producing, transporting, refining, and marketing company established in 1870 and split into multiple companies in 1911. Various buildings bear the Standard Oil name and multiple individual stations with this branding are historically notable:

Standard Oil Gasoline Station may refer to:

- St. Petersburg Standard Oil Station, a historic former gas station in St. Petersburg, Florida
- Standard Oil Gasoline Station (Odell, Illinois), a historic gas station in Odell, Illinois, that lies along historic U.S. Route 66
- Standard Oil Gasoline Station (Plainfield, Illinois), a historic building once used as a gas station in Plainfield, Illinois
- Standard Oil Gasoline Station (San Francisco, California), the last Standard Oil branded station in the state of California
- Standard Oil Company Filling Station in Bowling Green, Kentucky
- Standard Oil Service Station in Plant City, Florida
- Standard Oil Gasoline Station (Rochelle, Illinois)
- Standard Oil Gasoline Station (Louisville, Kentucky)
