= Registered historic properties in Whittier, California =

The city of Whittier, California, has numerous historic properties listed on federal, state, and local registries. Seven properties are listed on the National Register of Historic Places, and seven have been designated as California Historic Landmarks. The city's landmark listings are the most extensive, totaling 110 properties as of 2022.

Three properties are listed on all three registries:

- Jonathan Bailey House, built in the 1860s by early Quaker settler Jonathan Bailey, and the site of early Quaker meetings in the city;
- Standard Oil Building, built in 1914 to support oil drilling operations; and
- Orin Jordan House, a Victorian house built in 1888.

Other notable properties include Pio Pico Casa, the 19th century home of Pío Pico, a large land owner and the last Mexican governor of Alta California, and the Whittier Southern Pacific Railroad Depot, built in 1892.

== National Register ==
Seven buildings in Whittier have been listed on the National Register of Historic Places.

No.	Name	Image	Location	NRHP Year	Description
1	Pio Pico Casa		6003 Pioneer Blvd	1973	
2	Jonathan Bailey House		13421 E. Camilla St.	1977	
3	Standard Oil Building		7257 Bright Avenue	1980	
4	Orin Jordan House		8310 Comstock Ave	1980	
5	National Bank of Whittier Building		13002 Philadelphia St.	1982	
6	Hoover Hotel		7035 Greenleaf Ave	2002	
7	Whittier Southern Pacific Railroad Depot		7333 Greenleaf Ave (formerly 11825 Bailey St.)	2005	

== California Historic Landmarks ==
In addition, seven propertharries in Whittier (some sites having multiple buildings) have been designated by the State of California as California Historic Landmarks.

No.	Name	Image	Location	Date	Description
1	Casa de Governor Pio Pico		6003 Pioneer Blvd	1973	
2	Jonathan Bailey House		13421 E. Camilla St.	1977	
3	Standard Oil Building		7257 Bright Avenue	1980	
4	Orin Jordan House		8310 Comstock Ave	1980	
5	Johnson-Harrison House		6554 Friends Ave	1989	
6	Fred C. Nelles School		11850 Whittier Blvd	1994	Three designated buildings: school, administrative building, and superintendent's house
7	Whittier High School		12417 E Philadelphia Ave	1996	Multiple buildings designated, including science building, library, girl's locker room, commerce building, auditorium, cafeteria/annex, auto/machine shop, radio shop, art building, wood/print shop

== City-designated landmarks ==
In the first half of the 1980s, Whittier lost several historic buildings, including the Murphy Hospital, the William Penn Hotel, and in 1983 the sudden demolition of the arched Spanish-style Union Pacific depot. The Southern Pacific's decision to cease service led to concerns that the Southern Pacific depot, built in the 1880s, would also be lost.

The City adopted a historic resources ordinance in 1986. The ordinance required city approval for changes to the exterior of historic structures and provided a 180-day moratorium on the demolition process.

Only four buildings were designated in the first two years after passage of the ordinance. Two of those, the Briggs House and Southern Pacific Depot, were moved despite the designation. The 1987 Whittier Narrows earthquake substantially damaged other historic buildings, including the old City Hall, the Lindley Building, and the Harvey Apartments -- each of which was leveled after the earthquake. The Whittier Theatre, which was one of the first buildings receiving landmark designation, was also damaged in the earthquake; it was eventually leveled.

The loss of significant historic resources in the earthquake spurred a movement to accelerate the city's historic preservation efforts. After a review of more than 75 buildings, the Whittier City Council in October 1990 added 14 buildings to the local historic register.

No.	Name	Image	Location	Date	Description
1	Southern Pacific Railroad Depot		7333 Greenleaf Ave. (formerly 11825 Bailey St.)	1986-12-08	
2	Briggs House		6516 Bright Ave	1989-08-22	Built in 1901 for William P. Briggs, a citrus rancher, justice of the peace, and charter member of the First Friends Church
3	Johnson-Harrison House		6554 Friends Ave	1989-09-07	Craftsman house built 1912 for A.C. Johnson, who founded Whittier First National Savings Bank and was on the Whittier College board of trustees for 40 years. It was later owned by architect William Henry Harrison.
4	Strong House/Ranchito Del Fuerte		11114 Orange Dr.	1991-09-11	Built in late 1860s on 220 acres purchased by Charles and Harriet Strong from Pio Pico; Harriet became exporter of pampas grass
5	Chase House		6523 Bright Ave	1991-09-25	
6	Bailey House		13421 Camilla St	1991-09-25	
7	Orin Jordan House		8310 Comstock Ave	1991-09-25	Victorian house built 1900
8	Standard Oil Building		13033 Penn St	1991-09-25	Simple Mission Revival style, built 1914 as an early corporate office building
9	First National Bank of Whittier Building		13002 Philadelphia St	1991-09-25	Beaux Arts structure built 1922 has been the home of four community banks and also housed Richard Nixon's law office
10	Simon J. Murphy House		7758 S. College Ave	1991-09-25	Queen Anne Victorian built 1887, 1890, or 1892 (source disagree) by lumber dealer Simon Murphy, who was responsible for developing Whittier's water supply
11	Dorland House and Barn		12348 Dorland St	1991-09-25	Queen Anne Victorian built 1888 for the Dorland family, designation includes barn
12	Guirado House		6237 Greenleaf Ave	1991-09-25	Victorian house built in 1905 for Mary Ann King Gurado and her husband who operated a general store in Los Nietos
13	Wellesley House		8600 La Tremoina Ln	1991-09-25	Two-story ranch home built 1923 by Murphy Ranch & Oil Co. for its resident manager
14	East Whittier Woman's Improvement Clubhouse		14148 Second St	1991-09-25	Purchased in 1905 by the East Whittier Woman's Improvement Club and converted into a meetng hall; Richard Nixon's parents married at the site
15	Aubrey Wardman House		13952 Summit Dr	1991-09-25	Spanish-style home built in 1925 by the Wardman family that operated the local telephone company, built the Wardman Theatre, and donated buildings to Whittier College
16	Charles-Sutherland House		6537 Washington Ave	1991-09-25	Queen Anne Victorian built in 1893 by Barclay Johnson Charles
17	Citrus Ass'n Packing House		12327 Whittier Blvd	1991-09-25	Fruit cannery and warehouse built 1894, main packing house built 1902; later converted to shops
18	National Trust & Saving Bank		6754 Greenleaf Ave	1993-04-13	
19	Former Whittier Women's Club		6706 Friends Ave	1993-04-22	
20	Former Wardman Theater		7040 Greenleave Ave	1993-05-04	
21	Cool-a-Coo Ice Cream Plant		12025 Hadley St	1993-05-04	
22	Smullins House		6045 Painter Ave	1993-05-04	English country-style home built in 1916 for William and Anna Smullins, damaged in 1987 earthquake and restored with help from Whittier HIstorical Society
23	Mendenhall Hall (Whittier College)		13406 Philadelphia Ave	1993-05-04	
24	Landreth-Harrington House		7055 Washington Ave	1993-05-04	
25	St. Matthias Episcopal Church		7056 Washington Ave	1994-07	
26	Whittier Paradox Hybrid Walnut Tree		12300 Whittier Blvd	1994	Planted in 1903 or 1907, a hybrid between English or Persian walnut and a native California walnut; saved from ax when boulevard was widened during 1950s
27	Rios House		6318 Washington Ave	1995-03	
28	Stokes/Sullens House		6235 Bright Ave	1997-01-14	
29	Knupp House		6732 Pickering Ave	1997-05-27	
30	Osmun House		6513 Washington Ave	1997-10-28	
31	Strawbridge House		13648 La Cuarta	1997-11-11	
32	Seelt House		6317 Bright Ave	1997-12-09	
33	Sheridan House		6546 Friends Ave	1997-12-09	
34	S.C. Hookstratten Residence		11706 N Circle Dr	1998-07-28	
35	Batson House		6324 Painter Ave	1998-09-22	
36	Williams House		8201 Michigan Ave	2000-01-11	
37	Swain House		6743 Worsham Dr	2000-09-12	
37	Barr House		6056 Friends Ave	2000-11-28	
38	The Monterey Building		13019 Bailey St	2001-06-26	
39	Thornburgh House		6543 Washington Ave	2001-09-11	
40	Coppock House		5821 Painter Ave	2001-10-23	
41	Stoody House		6799 Worsham Dr	2001-12-18	
42	Eason House		5810 Brigh Ave	2002-10-22	
43	McGee House		7332 College Ave	2003-04-22	
44	Leslie/Myers House		13537 Beverly Blvd	2004-08-10	
45	Mauro Residence		14932 La Cuarta	2004-09-14	Neoclassical, built 1942
46	Warner/Snyder House		5813 Washington Ave	2014-12-07	
47	Holton-Haendiges Residence and Barn/Guest House		13634 Mar Vista St	2005-09-13	Owned by Dr. Quincy Adams Rollin Holton; a refuge for early Quaker settlers
48-108	Various			2015-07-07	61 houses were added to the local list on July 7, 2015, per "Residential Historic Resources Survey (2013)."
109	Nixon Tudor Cottage		15844 Whittier Blvd	2021-11-09	Address used by Richard Nixon while he was a Congressman and Vice President in the 1940s and 1960s
110	J. Clem Arnold Residence		6004 Painter Ave	2022-07-12	
