= Standard Oil Gasoline Station (San Francisco, California) =

- Location within San Francisco Standard Oil Gasoline Station (San Francisco, California) (California) Standard Oil Gasoline Station (San Francisco, California) (the United States)

General information
- Location: San Francisco, California, U.S.
- Coordinates: 37°47′23″N 122°25′21″W

The Standard Oil Gasoline Station on Van Ness Avenue in San Francisco is the last remaining gas station branded with Standard Oil in California, United States. It maintains this branding to maintain Chevron's claim to the trademark in California. It is located at 1501 Van Ness Avenue (as part of U.S. Route 101) in San Francisco, on the northwest corner of Van Ness Avenue and Pine Street. The station was reconstructed in 2022 and added one of Chevron's proprietary ExtraMile convenience stores, replacing what was previously a cashier kiosk. Besides the name, it operates as a typical Chevron.

== See also ==
- Standard Oil Gasoline Station (Odell, Illinois)
- Standard Oil Gasoline Station (Plainfield, Illinois)
- Standard Oil Gasoline Station (Bowling Green, Kentucky)
