= Folk Victorian =

Architectural style

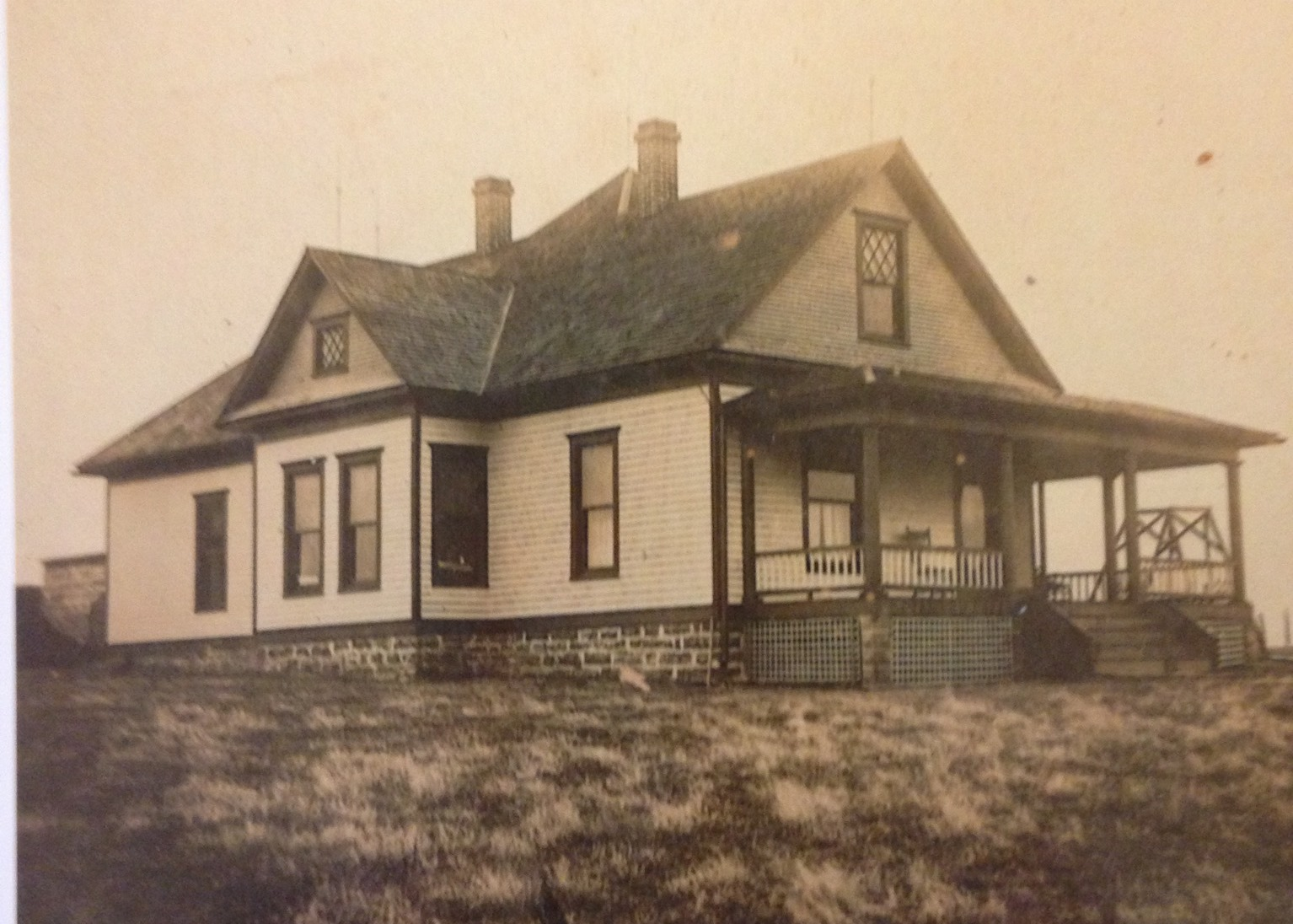
Midwestern home built in 1904. Modest exterior, interior features much woodwork

Folk Victorian is an architectural style employed for some homes in the United States and Europe between 1870 and 1910, though isolated examples continued to be built well into the 1930s. Folk Victorian homes are relatively plain in their construction but embellished with decorative trim. Folk Victorian is a subset of Victorian architecture. It differentiates itself from other subsets of Victorian architecture (such as Queen Anne) by being less elaborate and having more regular floor plans. Examples include the Bacon Hotel, Albert Spencer Wilcox Beach House, Lost Creek Baltimore and Ohio Railroad Depot (1892), James B. Carden House (1885), Ephriam M. Baynard House, and Sibley's General Store (1899) in the Sibley's and James Store Historic District.

== Background ==
Some of the main features of the Folk Victorian style include porches with spindlework detailing, an l-shape or a gable front plan, and details or inspiration from the Italianate or Queen Anne style. It is often identified by basic or simpler details with asymmetrical floor plans. The typical home is two-stories with a single story porch.

Many of these homes were put up during this time period due to the Industrial Revolution. People moving to the West needed simple and quick methods for building a house, and easy access to lightweight lumber helped to create a pre-cut and inexpensive way to get an iteration of the Victorian home.

== Gallery ==
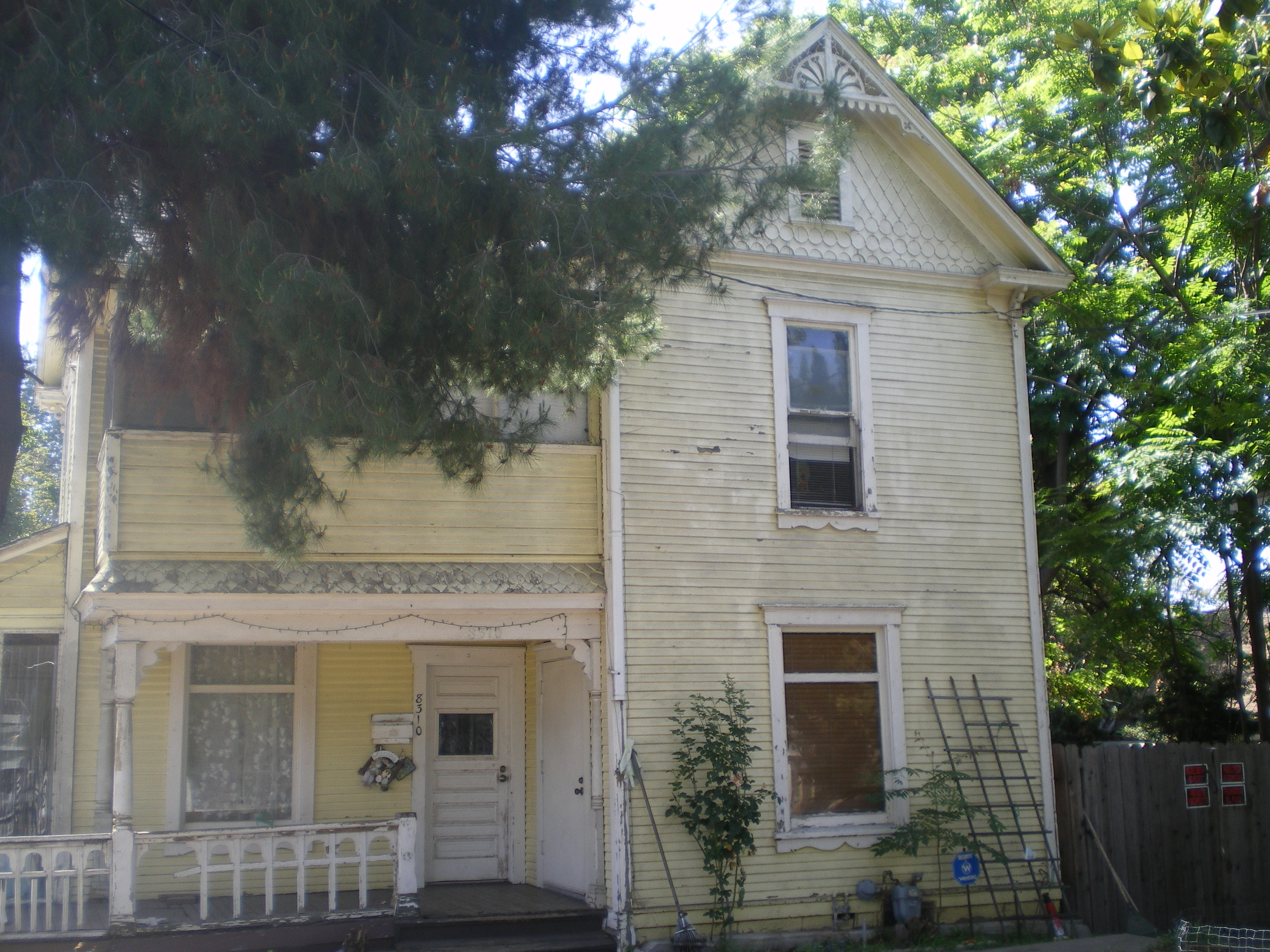
The Orin Jordan House in Whittier, California is an example of a Folk Victorian

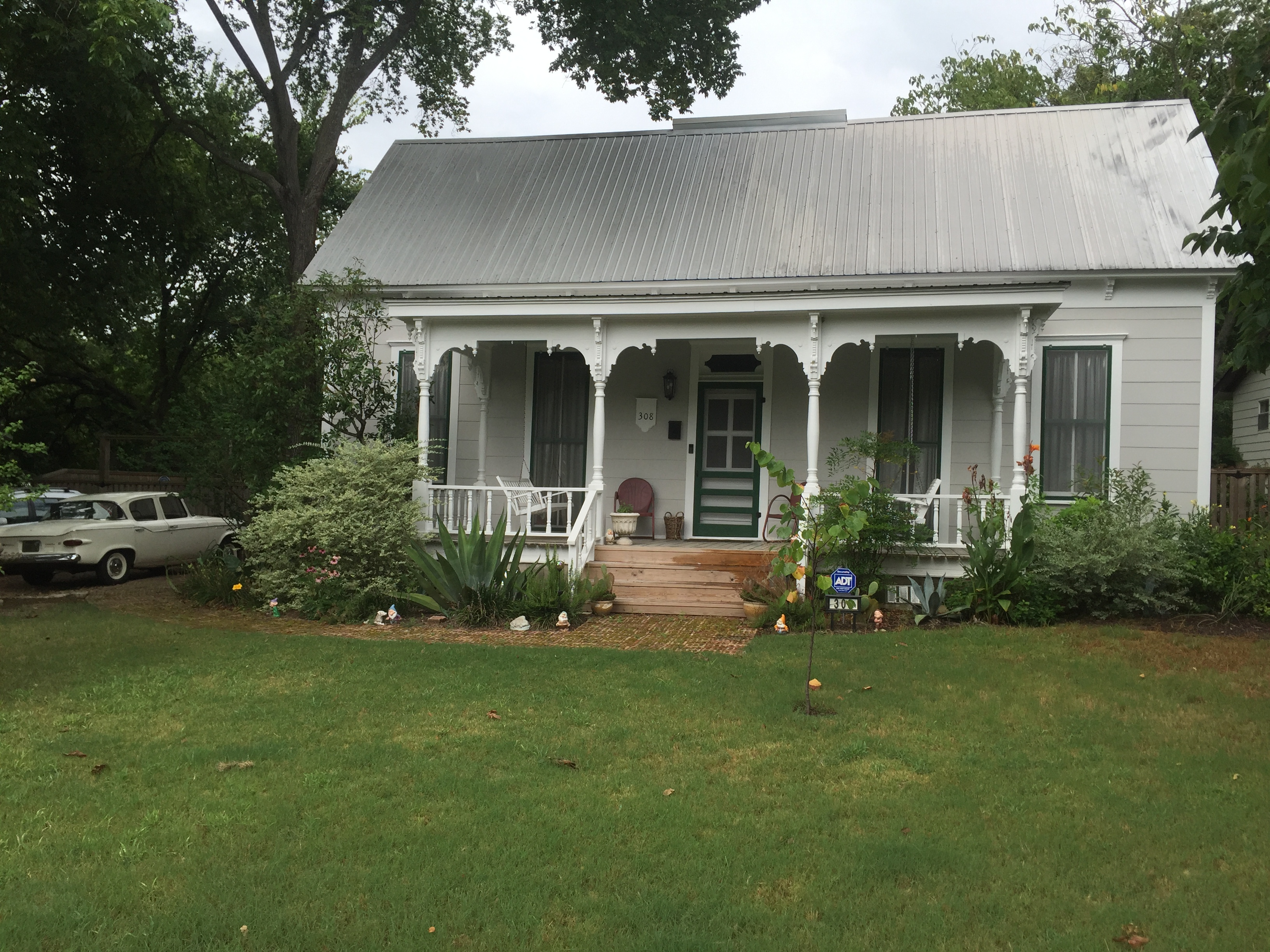
Early Folk Victorian home in Elgin, TX (Side Gable, Hall & Parlor design)

== See also ==
- Stick-Eastlake architecture in the United States
- Victorian architecture in the United States
