= Daniel Bassel House =

Historic house in West Virginia, United States

- U.S. National Register of Historic Places
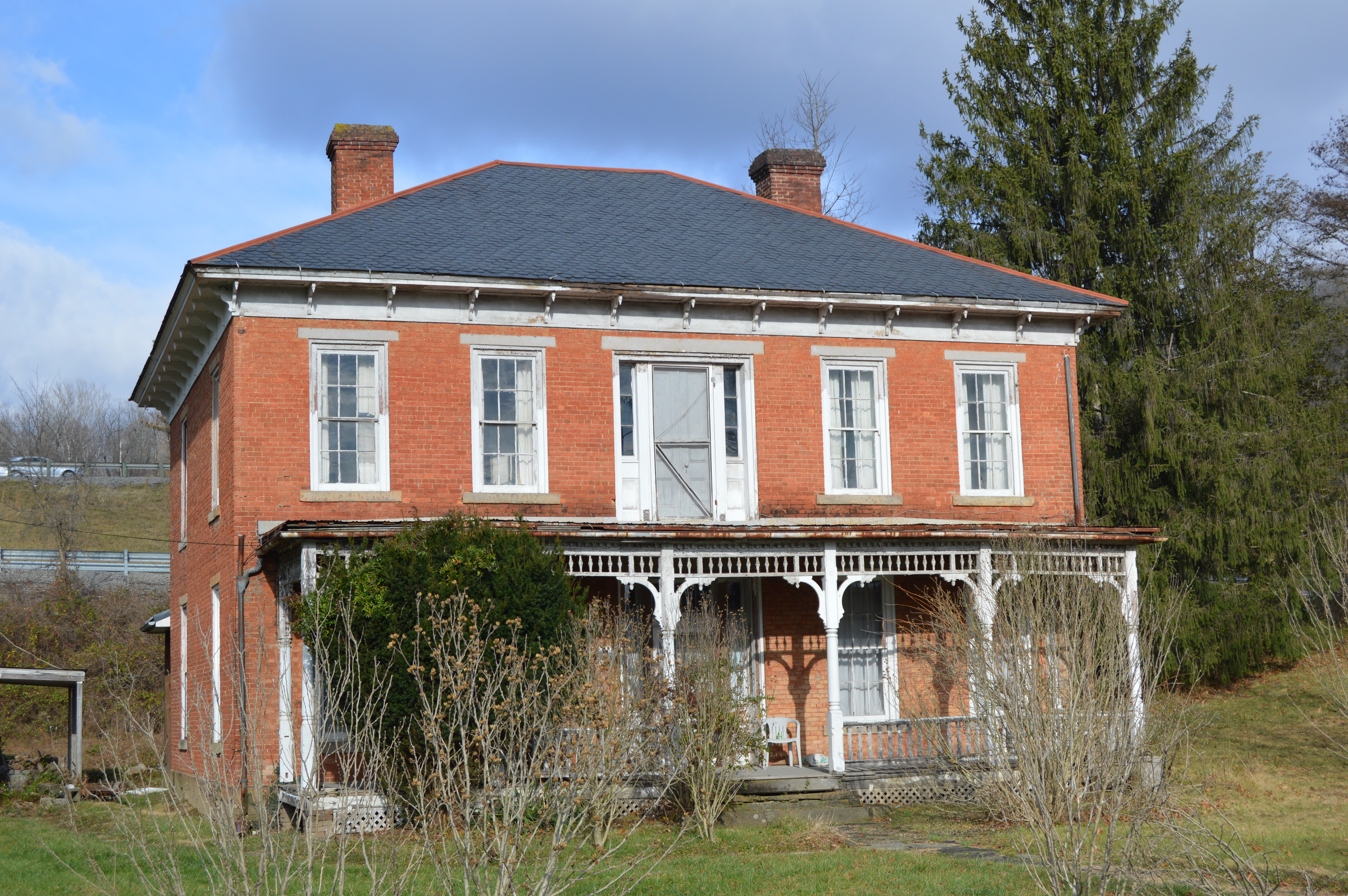
- Front of the house

- Location within West Virginia Location within the United States
- Location: WV 25, S of Jct. of WV 270 and WV 25, Lost Creek, West Virginia
- Coordinates: 39°9′48″N 80°21′22″W
- Area: 1.8 acres (0.73 ha)
- Built: 1865
- Architect: Jack Cockrell
- Architectural style: Double-Pile
- NRHP reference No.: 02000898
- Added to NRHP: August 22, 2002

Daniel Bassel House is a historic home located at Lost Creek, Harrison County, West Virginia. It was built between 1860 and 1865, and is a five bay, double pile red brick house with a hipped roof. It sits on a sandstone foundation. In the 1890s, a Queen Anne style full length porch was added to the front facade.

It was listed on the National Register of Historic Places in 2002.
