= Ephriam M. Baynard House =

Historic house in Florida, United States

- Ephraim M. Baynard House
- U.S. National Register of Historic Places
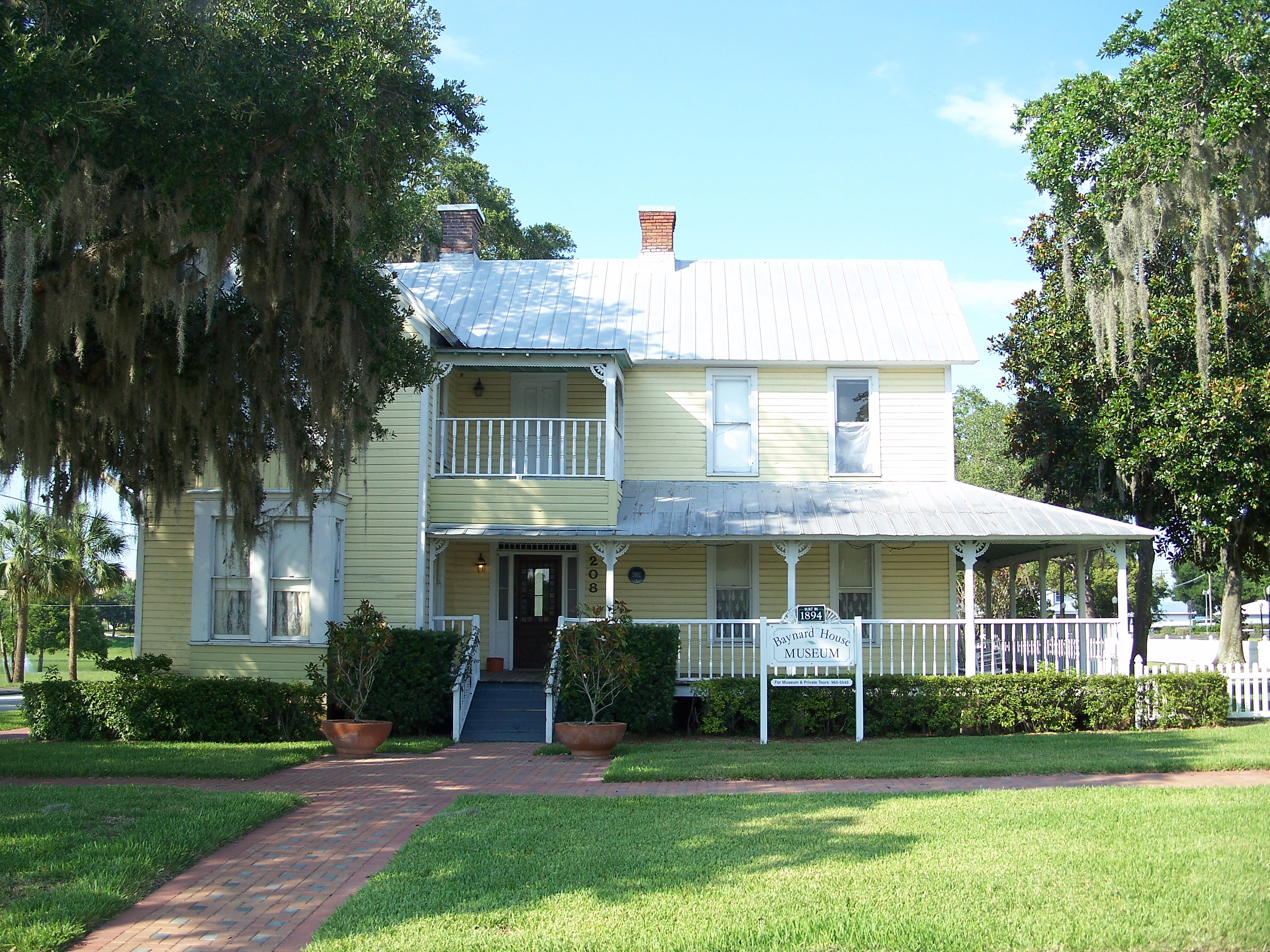

- Location within Florida Location within the United States
- Location: Auburndale, Florida
- Coordinates: 28°4′2″N 81°47′22″W
- Built: 1894
- NRHP reference No.: 01001208
- Added to NRHP: November 10, 2001

The Ephraim M. Baynard House is a historic home in Auburndale, Florida, located at 208 West Lake Avenue. On November 10, 2001, it was added to the U.S. National Register of Historic Places and houses the Baynard House Museum.

The Architect was Alfred Chipman Thorp, and Baynard's home was designed and built in the Folk Victorian style.

The house's namesake, Ephraim Mikell Baynard (1860-1933) was a real estate developer in the region. Baynard was designated a Great Floridian by the Florida Department of State in the Great Floridians 2000 Program. A plaque attesting the honor is located at the Baynard House.

== Gallery ==
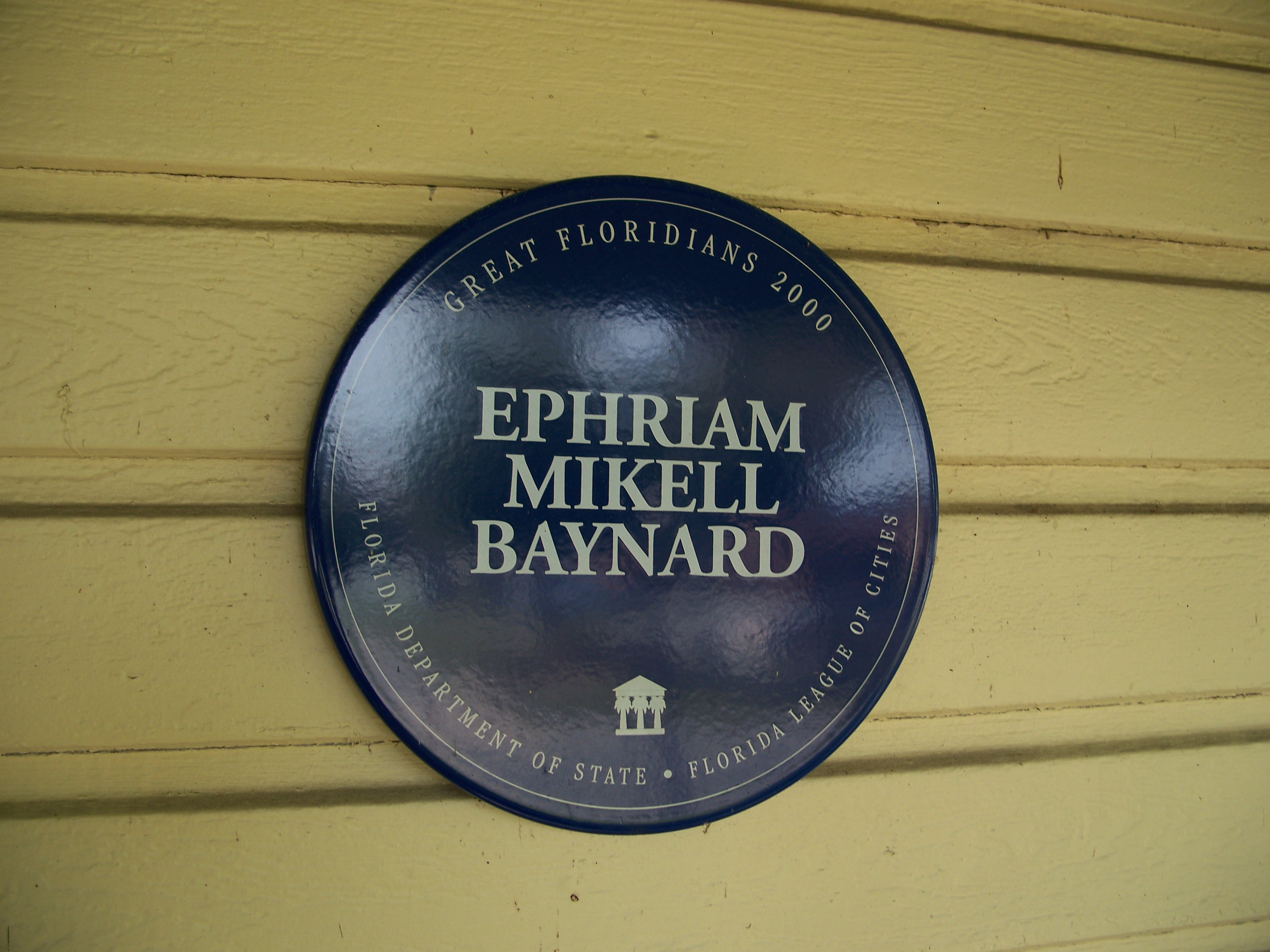
Great Floridian plaque

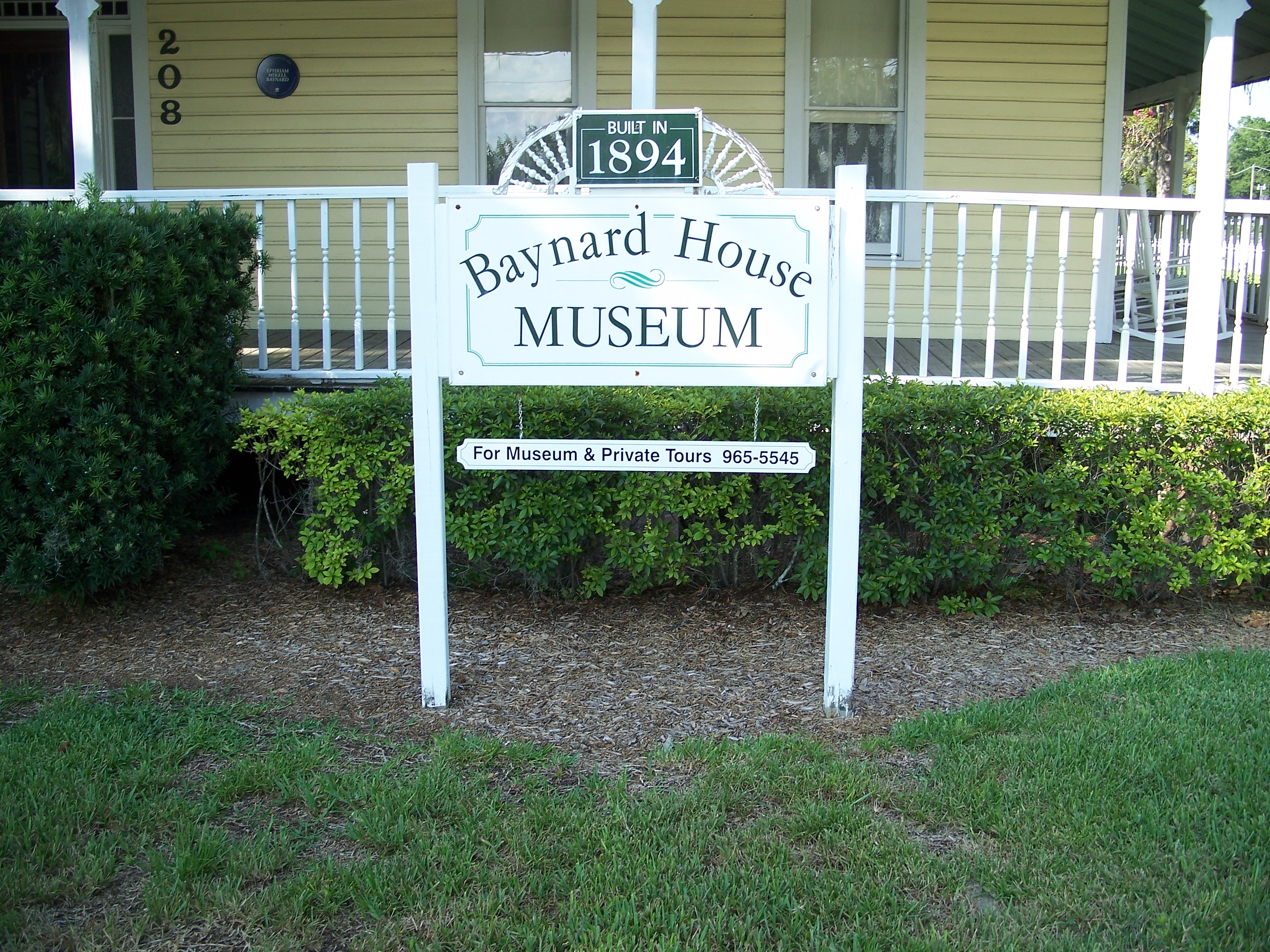
Sign outside

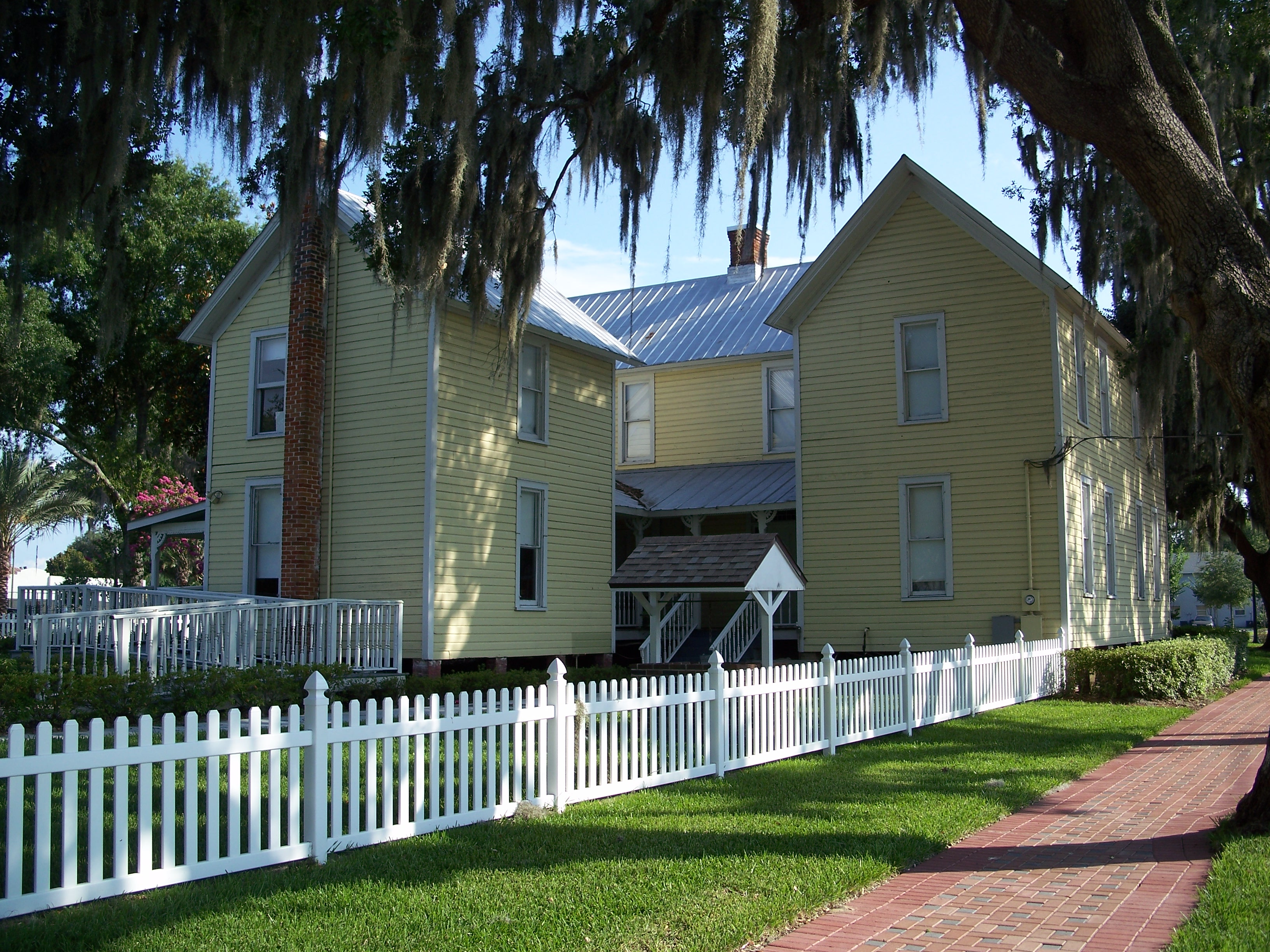
