= Downtown Plainfield Historic District =

Historic district in Illinois, United States

- U.S. National Register of Historic Places
- U.S. Historic district
- Location within Illinois Location within the United States
- Location: Lockport Street bounded by Division & Main Streets, Plainfield, Will County, Illinois, U.S.
- Coordinates: 41°36′30″N 88°12′18″W
- Architectural style: Greek Revival, Italianate, Richardsonian Romanesque, Queen Anne, International Style
- NRHP reference No.: 13000719
- Added to NRHP: September 18, 2013

The Downtown Plainfield Historic District is the historic downtown area of Plainfield, Illinois, United States. The four block district reflects popular architectural styles of the mid-19th to mid-20th century.

== History ==
Plainfield, Illinois was founded in August 1834 by Chester Ingersoll, who platted a town just north of the 1828 settlement of Walker's Corners. In December that year, Levi Arnold bought the land directly north of Ingersoll's and began to subdivide it; this area would later become the historic district. The construction of the Illinois and Michigan Canal in the 1840s brought new residents to Plainfield, as the canal headquarters was only 6 miles (9.7 km) east in Lockport. Lockport Road connected the two settlements and became an important thoroughfare once the canal opened in 1848. Plainfield also became a convenient stop for travelers going between Chicago and Ottawa. Early development was primarily consisted of residential areas, but by the late 1840s, a concentration of commercial developments began to organize at the junction of Ingersoll and Arnold's plats. Isaiah Clippinger subdivided his property for commercial use on the south side of Lockport Street between Des Plaines and Illinois Streets. The DuPage Inn and Tavern was one of the first major commercial ventures, located around the site of what is now 24216 Lockport Street.

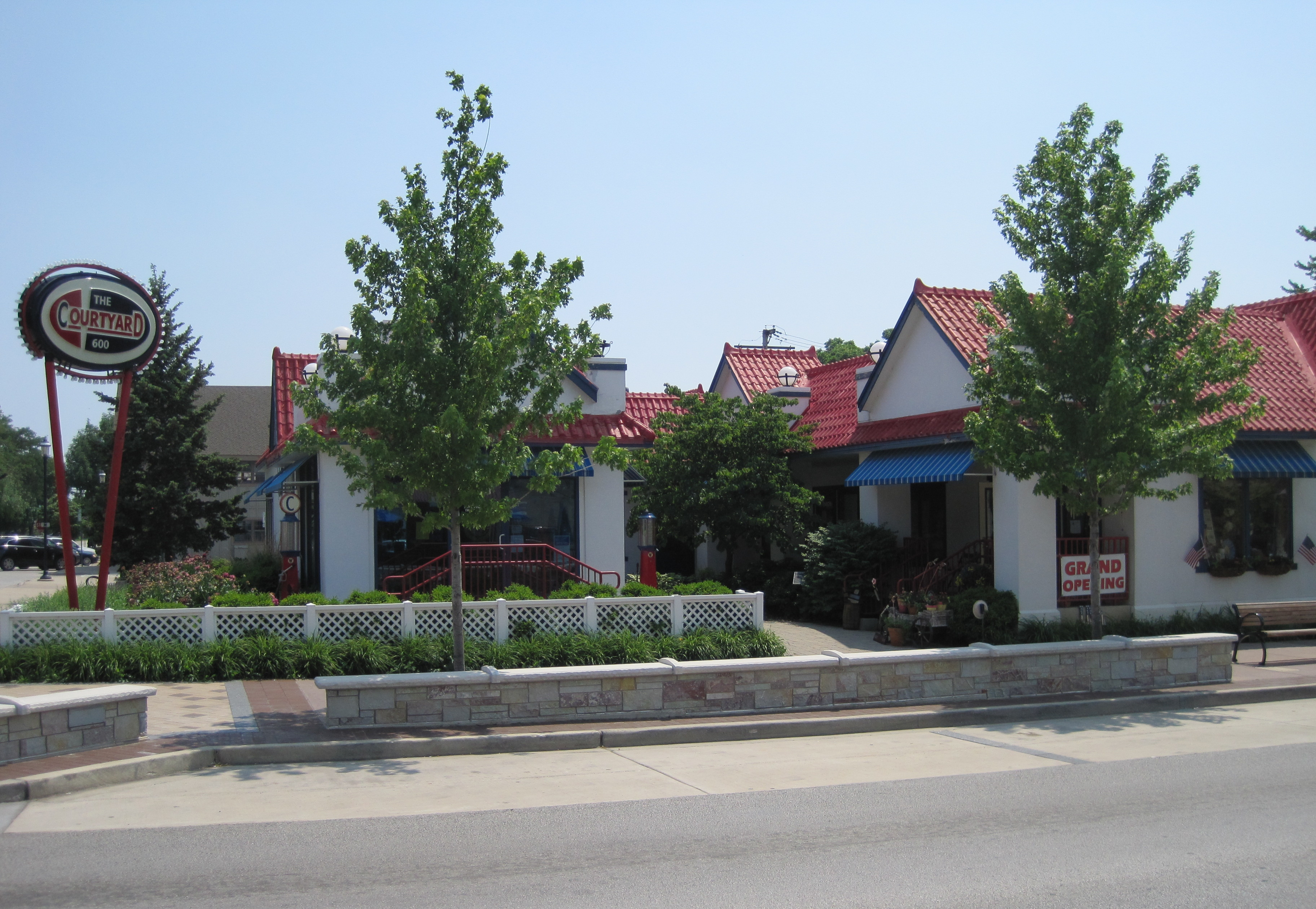
The former Standard Oil Gasoline Station is a contributing property to the district.

The Village of Plainfield was formed in 1869 when the northern and southern sections decided to unite. it was incorporated in 1877 with a population of around 700. Most commercial structures were wood-framed and were destroyed during a series of four fires from 1888 to 1899. Development in the ensuing decades was prompted by Plainfield's location on an important transportation corridor. In 1904, the Aurora, Plainfield & Joliet Railway provided interurban service between these three cities and located its maintenance shop at 24216 Lockport Street. In late 1920s, Lincoln Highway, which passed through town via Lockport Street, was designated as the first transcontinental highway for automobiles, promoting auto-related commercial development in Plainfield. The Standard Oil station at the southwest corner of Des Plaines and Lockport is the best surviving remnant of the era.
