= Lost Creek station =

- Lost Creek Baltimore and Ohio Railroad Depot
- U.S. National Register of Historic Places
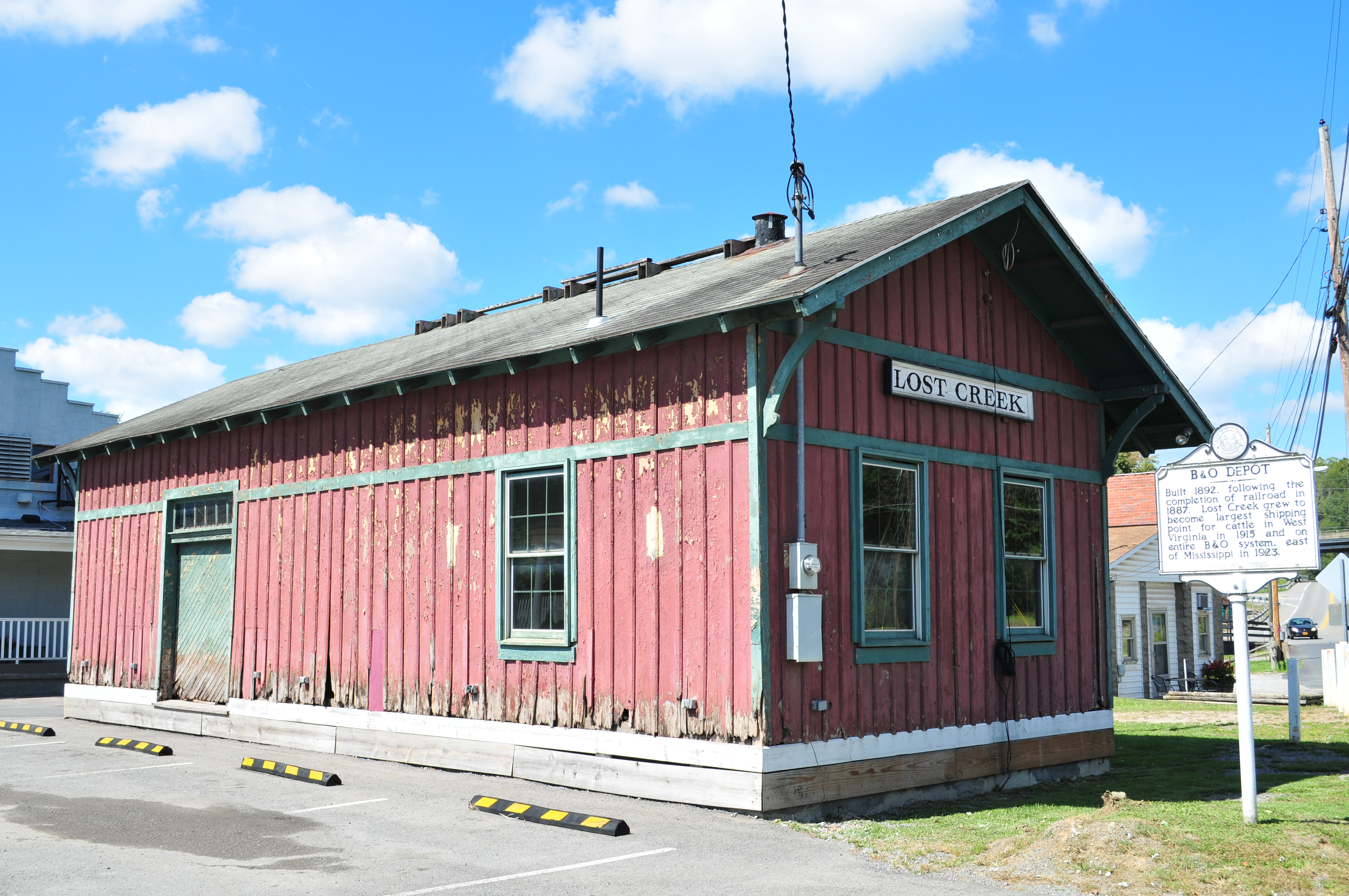

- Location within West Virginia Location within the United States
- Location: Main St., Lost Creek Rd. and Cty Rte 48, Lost Creek, West Virginia
- Coordinates: 39°9′37″N 80°21′6″W
- Area: 0.1 acres (0.040 ha)
- Built: 1892, 1923
- Built by: Baltimore and Ohio Railroad
- Architectural style: Folk Victorian
- NRHP reference No.: 05000660
- Added to NRHP: July 6, 2005

Lost Creek station is a historic railroad depot located at Lost Creek, Harrison County, West Virginia. It was built in 1892 by the Baltimore and Ohio Railroad, and is a one-story, Folk Victorian frame building with board-and-batten siding. It measures 44 by 18.5 feet (13.4 m × 5.6 m). In 1923, it was the largest cattle shipping point east of the Mississippi River.

It was listed on the National Register of Historic Places in 2005 as the Lost Creek Baltimore and Ohio Railroad Depot.
