= Standard Oil Building =

Standard Oil Building can refer to:

- Standard Oil Building (Baltimore, Maryland), a 15-story historic office building in the United States
- Standard Oil Building (Chicago), Illinois, now known as the Aon Center
- Standard Oil Building (Cleveland), Ohio
- Standard Oil Building (San Francisco), California
- Standard Oil Building (New York City), New York
- Standard Oil Building (Whittier, California)
