= James B. Carden House =

Historic house in West Virginia, United States

- U.S. National Register of Historic Places
- Location within West Virginia Location within the United States
- Nearest city: Summersville, West Virginia
- Coordinates: 38.2865°N 80.9510°W
- Area: 7.2 acres (2.9 ha)
- Built: 1885
- NRHP reference No.: 01000773
- Added to NRHP: August 2, 2001

James B. Carden House is a historic home located near Summersville, Nicholas County, West Virginia. It was built in 1885, and is a two-story, "T"-plan, frame, Folk Victorian style house. It features a two-story front porch running the full width of the house. Also on the property are an end gable barn and a small workshop. It has been occupied since 1971, by a restaurant known as the Country Road Inn-Mama Jerrols.

It was listed on the National Register of Historic Places in 2001.
