= Old Thomas James Store =

Historic commercial building in Virginia, United States

- U.S. National Register of Historic Places
- U.S. Historic district – Contributing property
- Virginia Landmarks Register
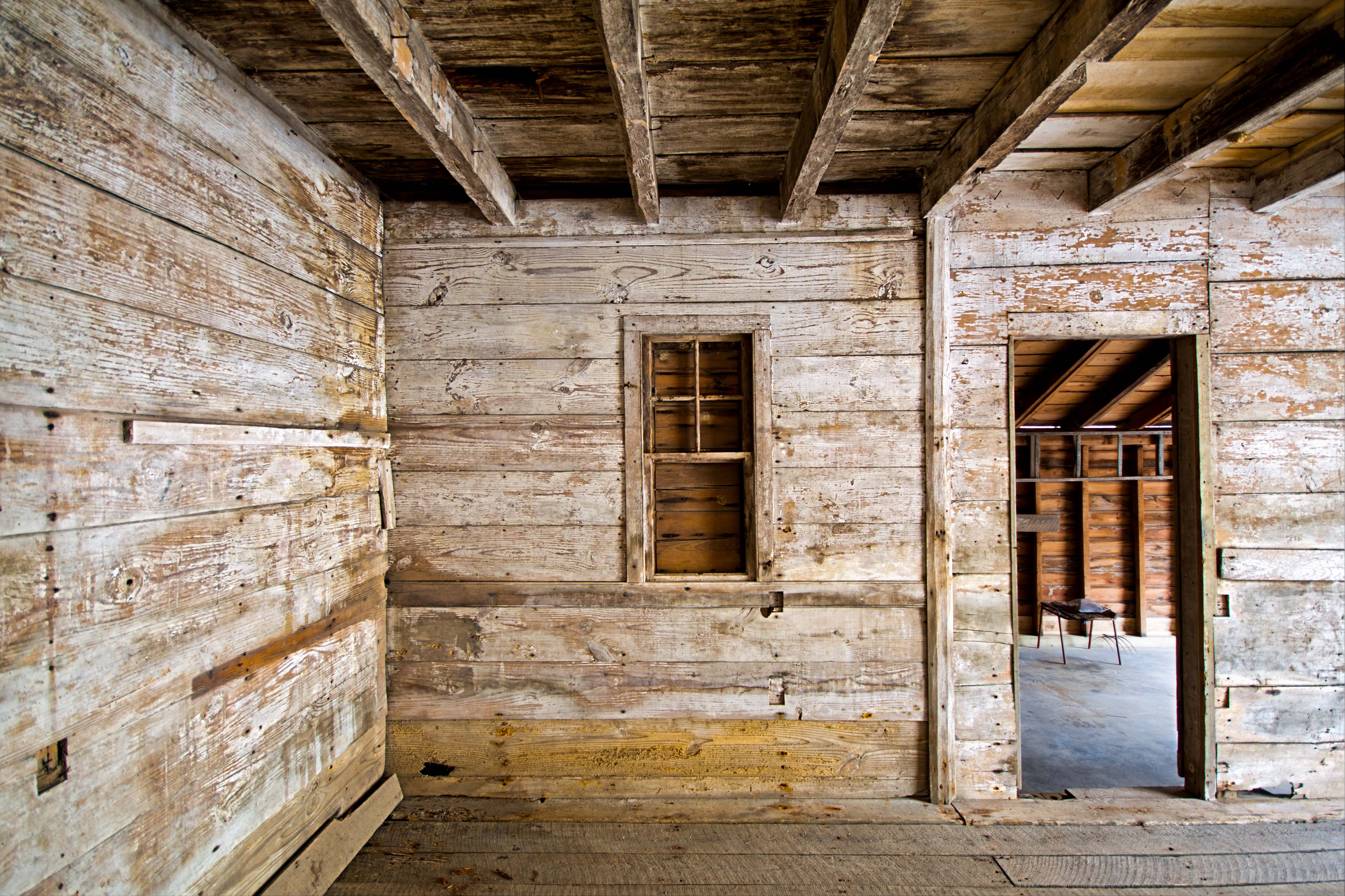
- James Store Interior, April 2011

- Location within Virginia Location within the United States
- Location: Main & Maple Sts., Mathews Court House, Virginia
- Coordinates: 37°26′9″N 76°19′14″W
- Area: less than one acre
- Architectural style: 19th-century antebellum store, Other
- NRHP reference No.: 08000244
- VLR No.: 057-5027

Significant dates
- Added to NRHP: March 28, 2008
- Designated VLR: June 6, 2007, September 18, 2008

The Old Thomas James Store in Mathews Court House, Virginia pre-dates the American Civil War. It was listed on the National Register of Historic Places (NRHP) in 2008. It has also been known as The Old Store and as James Store.

It has been moved once or twice in its history, including in 1899, and is now located behind the Sibley's Store.

It is individually listed on the NRHP but is also a contributing property in a historic district that is NRHP-listed, the Sibley's and James Store Historic District.
