= Lost Creek, West Virginia =

- Town
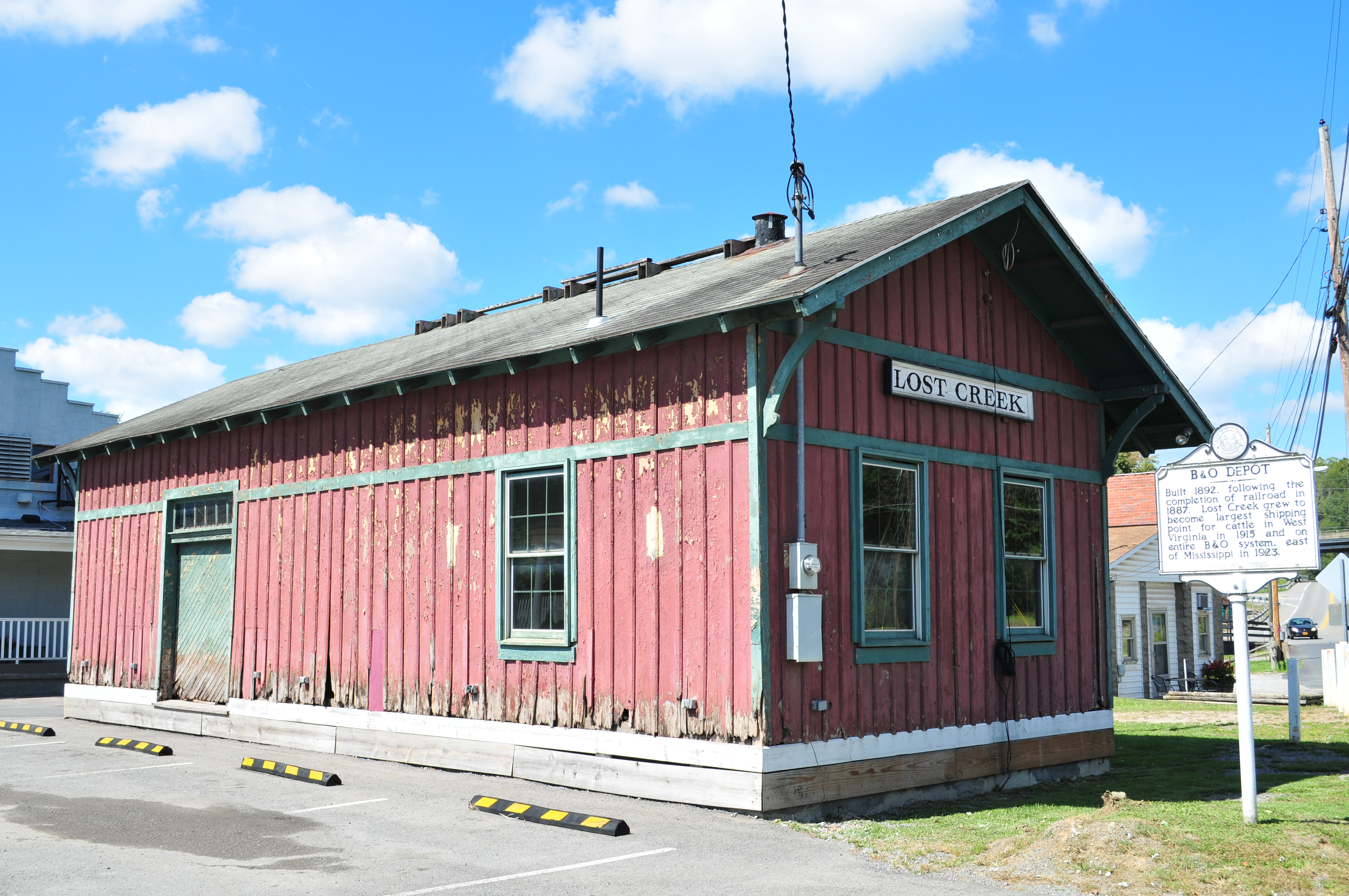
- Lost Creek West Virginia Baltimore and Ohio Railroad Depot

- Location of Lost Creek in Harrison County, West Virginia.
- Coordinates: 39°9′30″N 80°20′53″W
- Country: United States
- State: West Virginia
- County: Harrison

Area
  - Total: 0.97 sq mi (2.51 km^{2})
  - Land: 0.97 sq mi (2.51 km^{2})
  - Water: 0 sq mi (0.00 km^{2})
- Elevation: 1,020 ft (311 m)

Population (2020)
  - Total: 359
  - Estimate (2021): 357
  - Density: 477.9/sq mi (184.51/km^{2})
- Time zone: UTC-5 (Eastern (EST))
  - Summer (DST): UTC-4 (EDT)
- ZIP code: 26385
- Area code: 304
- FIPS code: 54-48748
- GNIS feature ID: 1554998
- Website: https://local.wv.gov/lostcreek/Pages/default.aspx

Lost Creek is a town in Harrison County, West Virginia, United States. The population was 359 at the 2020 census.

== History ==
Lost Creek was incorporated in 1946, and was named after nearby Lost Creek. The creek itself was named after messages carved on nearby trees during early European exploration of the area.

The Daniel Bassel House and Lost Creek Baltimore and Ohio Railroad Depot are listed on the National Register of Historic Places.

== Geography ==
Lost Creek is located at 39°9′30″N 80°20′53″W (39.158451, -80.348165) in southern Harrison County.

According to the United States Census Bureau, the town has a total area of 0.97 square miles (2.51 km^{2}), all of it land.

== Demographics ==
Historical population
| Census | Pop. | Note | %± |
|---|---|---|---|
| 1950 | 798 | | — |
| 1960 | 678 | | −15.0% |
| 1970 | 571 | | −15.8% |
| 1980 | 604 | | 5.8% |
| 1990 | 413 | | −31.6% |
| 2000 | 467 | | 13.1% |
| 2010 | 496 | | 6.2% |
| 2020 | 359 | | −27.6% |
| 2021 (est.) | 357 | ▼ | −0.6% |
U.S. Decennial Census

=== 2020 Census ===
Lost Creek, West Virginia - Demographic Profile(NH = Non-Hispanic)
| Race / Ethnicity | Pop 2020 | % 2020 |
|---|---|---|
| White alone (NH) | 329 | 91.64% |
| Black or African American alone (NH) | 1 | 0.28% |
| Native American or Alaska Native alone (NH) | 0 | 0.00% |
| Asian alone (NH) | 1 | 0.28% |
| Pacific Islander alone (NH) | 0 | 0.00% |
| Some Other Race alone (NH) | 0 | 0.00% |
| Mixed Race/Multi-Racial (NH) | 7 | 1.95% |
| Hispanic or Latino (any race) | 21 | 5.85% |
| Total | 359 | 100.00% |

Note: the US Census treats Hispanic/Latino as an ethnic category. This table excludes Latinos from the racial categories and assigns them to a separate category. Hispanics/Latinos can be of any race.

=== 2010 Census ===
As of the census of 2010, there were 496 people, 185 households, and 139 families living in the town. The population density was 511.3 inhabitants per square mile (197.4/km^{2}). There were 205 housing units at an average density of 211.3 per square mile (81.6/km^{2}). The racial makeup of the town was 95.8% White, 0.8% African American, 0.4% Native American, 0.6% from other races, and 2.4% from two or more races. Hispanic or Latino of any race were 1.8% of the population.

There were 185 households, of which 37.3% had children under the age of 18 living with them, 49.7% were married couples living together, 20.0% had a female householder with no husband present, 5.4% had a male householder with no wife present, and 24.9% were non-families. 18.9% of all households were made up of individuals, and 8.1% had someone living alone who was 65 years of age or older. The average household size was 2.68 and the average family size was 2.97.

The median age in the town was 38.2 years. 27.6% of residents were under the age of 18; 3.6% were between the ages of 18 and 24; 26.3% were from 25 to 44; 28.5% were from 45 to 64; and 14.1% were 65 years of age or older. The gender makeup of the town was 48.2% male and 51.8% female.

=== 2000 Census ===
As of the census of 2000, there were 467 people, 184 households, and 133 families living in the town. The population density was 461.4 inhabitants per square mile (178.5/km^{2}). There were 207 housing units at an average density of 204.5 per square mile (79.1/km^{2}). The racial makeup of the town was 98.29% White, 0.21% Asian, and 1.50% from two or more races. Hispanic or Latino of any race were 0.43% of the population.

There were 184 households, out of which 27.2% had children under the age of 18 living with them, 52.7% were married couples living together, 15.8% had a female householder with no husband present, and 27.7% were non-families. 24.5% of all households were made up of individuals, and 13.6% had someone living alone who was 65 years of age or older. The average household size was 2.54 and the average family size was 3.00.

In the town, the population was spread out, with 21.8% under the age of 18, 8.8% from 18 to 24, 30.0% from 25 to 44, 23.6% from 45 to 64, and 15.8% who were 65 years of age or older. The median age was 39 years. For every 100 females, there were 91.4 males. For every 100 females age 18 and over, there were 97.3 males.

The median income for a household in the town was $26,563, and the median income for a family was $35,893. Males had a median income of $32,292 versus $19,500 for females. The per capita income for the town was $15,711. About 22.6% of families and 26.0% of the population were below the poverty line, including 36.8% of those under age 18 and 20.5% of those age 65 or over.

== Education ==
Lost Creek is home to Lost Creek Elementary School, South Harrison Middle School, and South Harrison High School . The three schools are part of the Harrison County School District. In 2021, a new Lost Creek Elementary School was constructed adjacent to the South Harrison campus.
