= Jonathan Bailey House (Whittier, California) =

Historic house in California, United States

- U.S. National Register of Historic Places
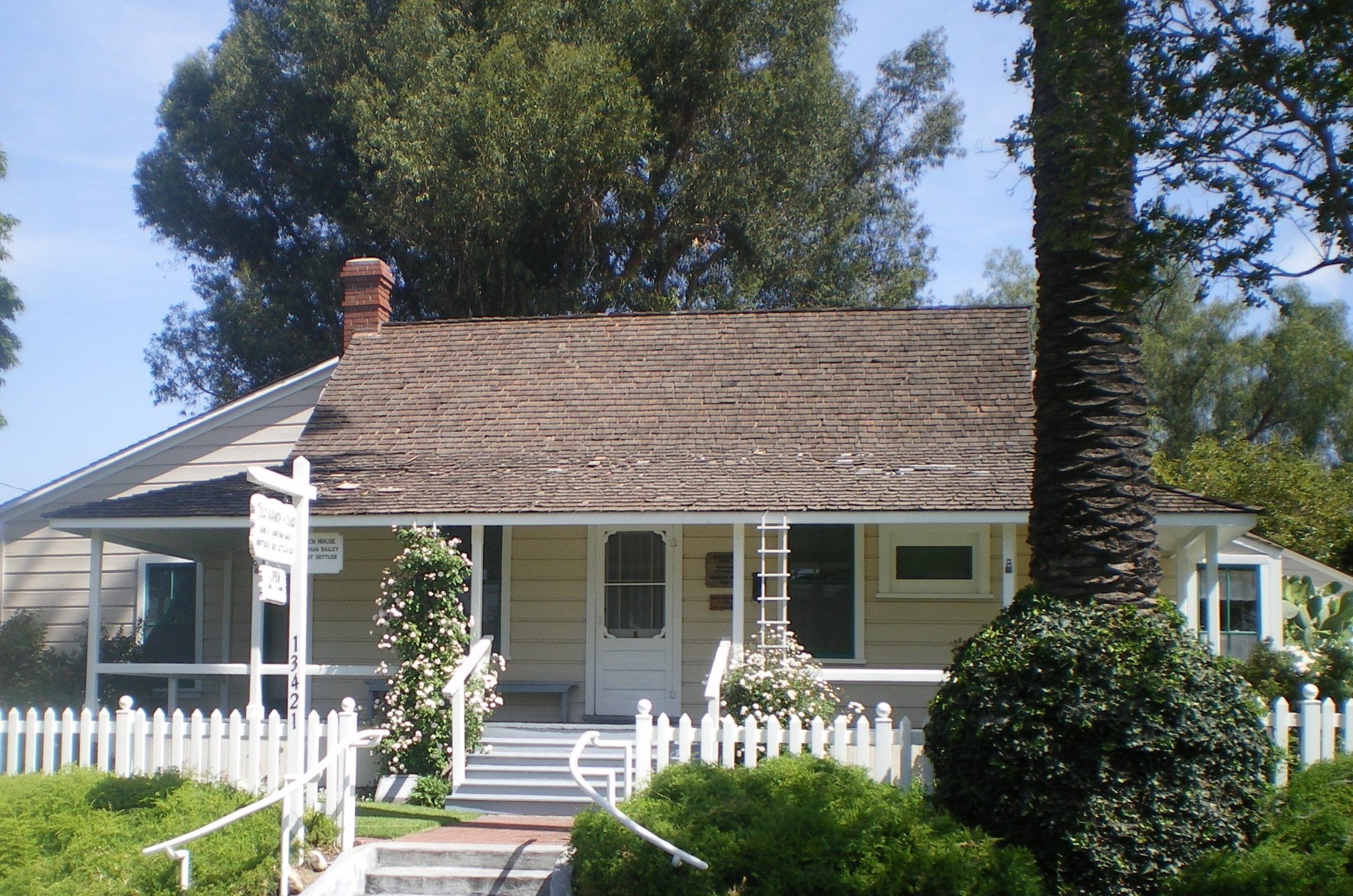
- Bailey House, 2008

- Location within the Los Angeles metropolitan area Location within California Location within the United States
- Location: 13421 E. Camilla St. Whittier, California
- Coordinates: 33°59′5″N 118°1′53″W
- Built: c. 1860
- NRHP reference No.: 77000304
- Added to NRHP: August 29, 1977

Formerly known as "The Old Ranch House", the Jonathan Bailey House is a historic site in Whittier, California. The Bailey House was built around 1868–1869 by Jacob Gerkens. In 1887, the house was occupied by Quakers Jonathan Bailey and his wife, Rebecca. It is the oldest remaining building in Whittier. The first Quaker meetings in the area were held on the front porch of the Bailey House. In 1975, the Jonathan Bailey House was deeded to the City of Whittier and now operates as a museum by the Whittier Historical Society with maintenance by the City of Whittier Park Department with special help from volunteers. The property was added to the National Register of Historic Places in 1977.

== Jonathan Bailey ==
Jonathan Bailey was born in Prince George County, Virginia, in 1819. When just a boy, the Bailey family relocated to Ohio along with many other Quaker families. As an adult, Jonathan Bailey married Rebecca Frazier, owned a successful mill, was a farmer, became a church and community leader, and at the age of 68, he and his wife moved to Whittier, California.
