= St. Petersburg Standard Oil Station =

Historic gas station in Florida

Coordinates: 27°44′45″N 82°38′20″W

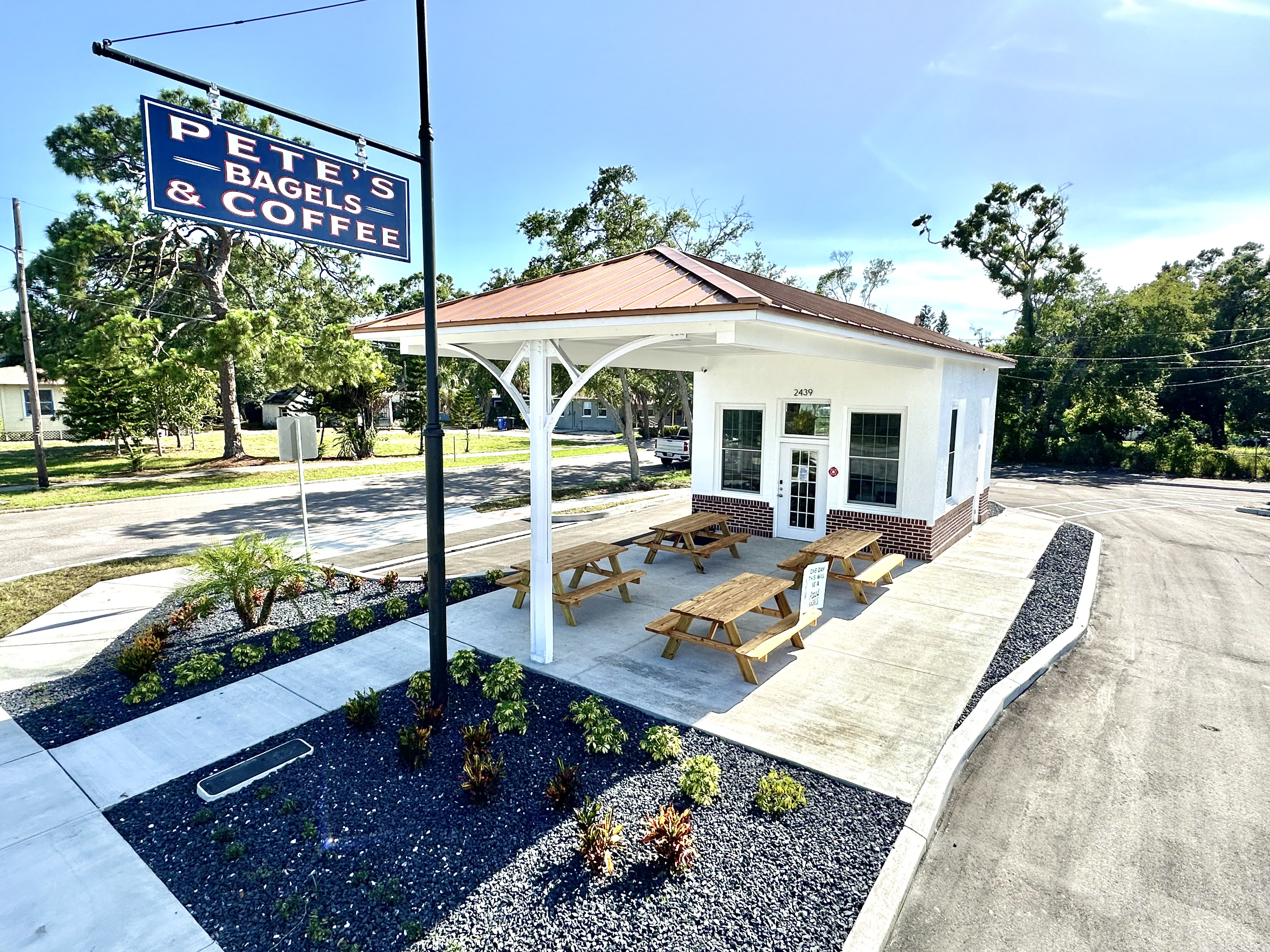

General information
- Architectural style: Early Commercial
- Location: 2439 4th Street South, St. Petersburg, Florida, United States
- Year built: 1926

Technical details
- Material: Stucco, Brick, Steel
- Floor count: 1

The St. Petersburg Standard Oil Station is an historic service station site in St. Petersburg, Florida, United States. It is located at 2439 4th Street South, in the Harbordale neighborhood.

== History ==
The structure was built by the Standard Oil Company of Kentucky in 1926. By 1927, St. Petersburg had seven Standard Oil stations; today, only this station remains. The station was in use as a Standard Oil until 1962.

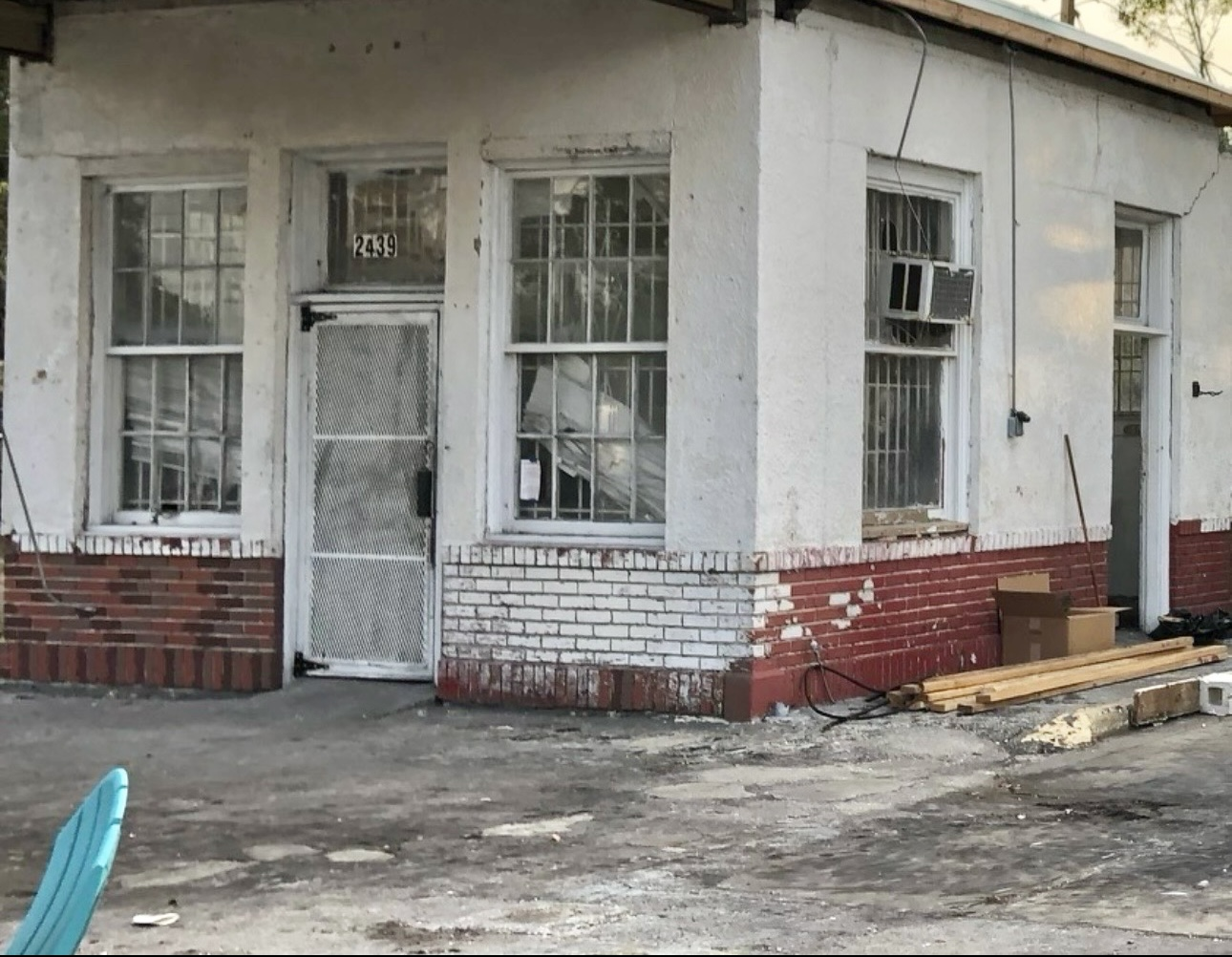
View of building pre restoration

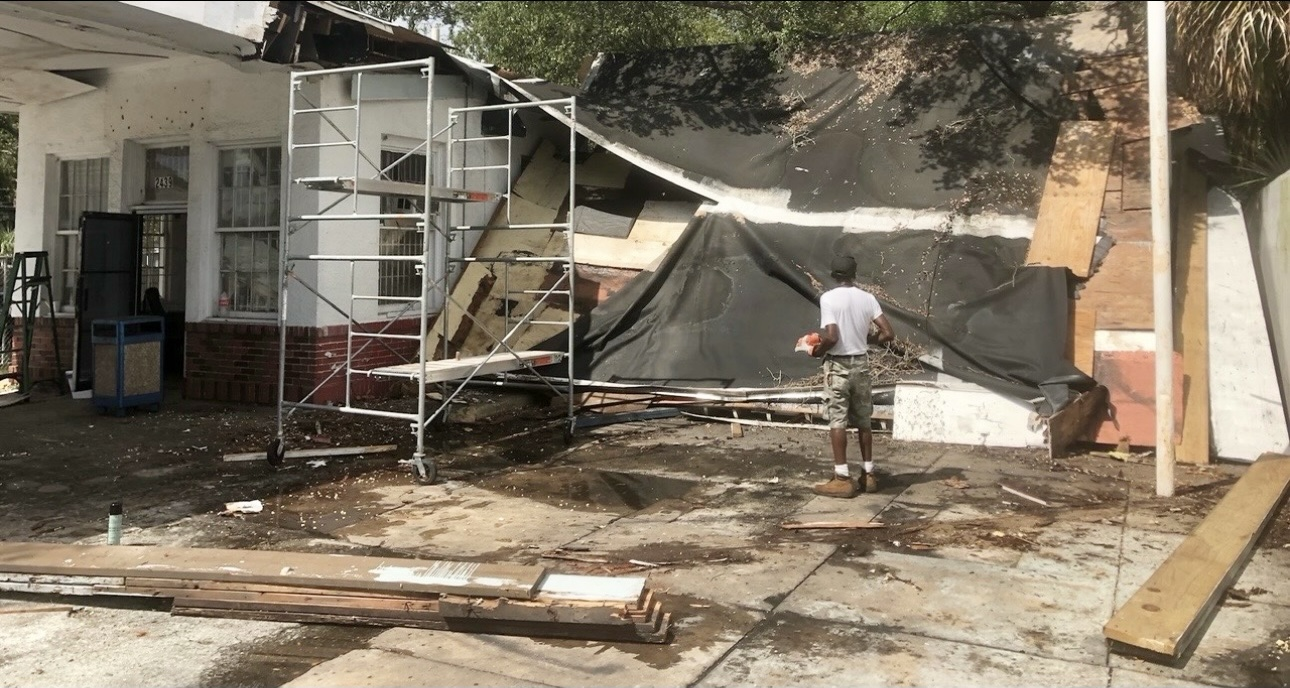
View of building pre restoration

After decades of neglect, in 1997, the property was condemned by the city and slated for demolition due to "severe" wood rot, termite damage, broken windows, holes in wall, and issues with plumbing, paint and wiring,. The owner offered to gift the property to the city to clear up violations, but was denied

Restoration began in 2020, removing alterations including a later constructed flat roof canopy, and two additional storage buildings attached to the historic portion. They were demolished and the roof rebuilt using examples in Plant City, Florida and Bowling Green, Kentucky on the way to reconstruct the hipped roof, a key architectural feature for the building. The original brick water table, which had deteriorated, was restored as well.

In 2023, it was added to the St. Petersburg Register of Historic Places. In 2025, with the restoration of the original station's sign post, it was added to the list of St. Pete's Signs of Historic Significance. It is constructed of piping from the Youngstown Sheet and Tube company.

On May 14, 2025, the project was awarded the Preserve the 'Burg Award for Best Commercial Rehabilitation/ Adaptive Reuse. "This was always a sociology experiment" owner Robert Blackmon said "If you take something that's blighted and turn it into the pride of the community, can it change the entire neighborhood? We hope the answer is 'yes'".

It is announced that there are future plans for the site to become a drive through coffee and bagel business, an example of adaptive reuse. In June 2025, renovations were completed and the building reopened as Pete's Bagels Drive Thru

The building’s restoration won a 2026 Florida Preservation Award in the Restoration, Rehabilitation or Adaptive Use category. Held by the Florida Trust for Historic Preservation, awards “recognize excellence in historic preservation throughout the state”.

== Architecture ==
The station was built in the Early Commercial style. It is of brick construction, with heavy stucco finish and an exposed brick water table. Other defining features include the front canopy and hipped roof, "Y" shaped metal truss supporting the front canopy, and large transom window over the central front door

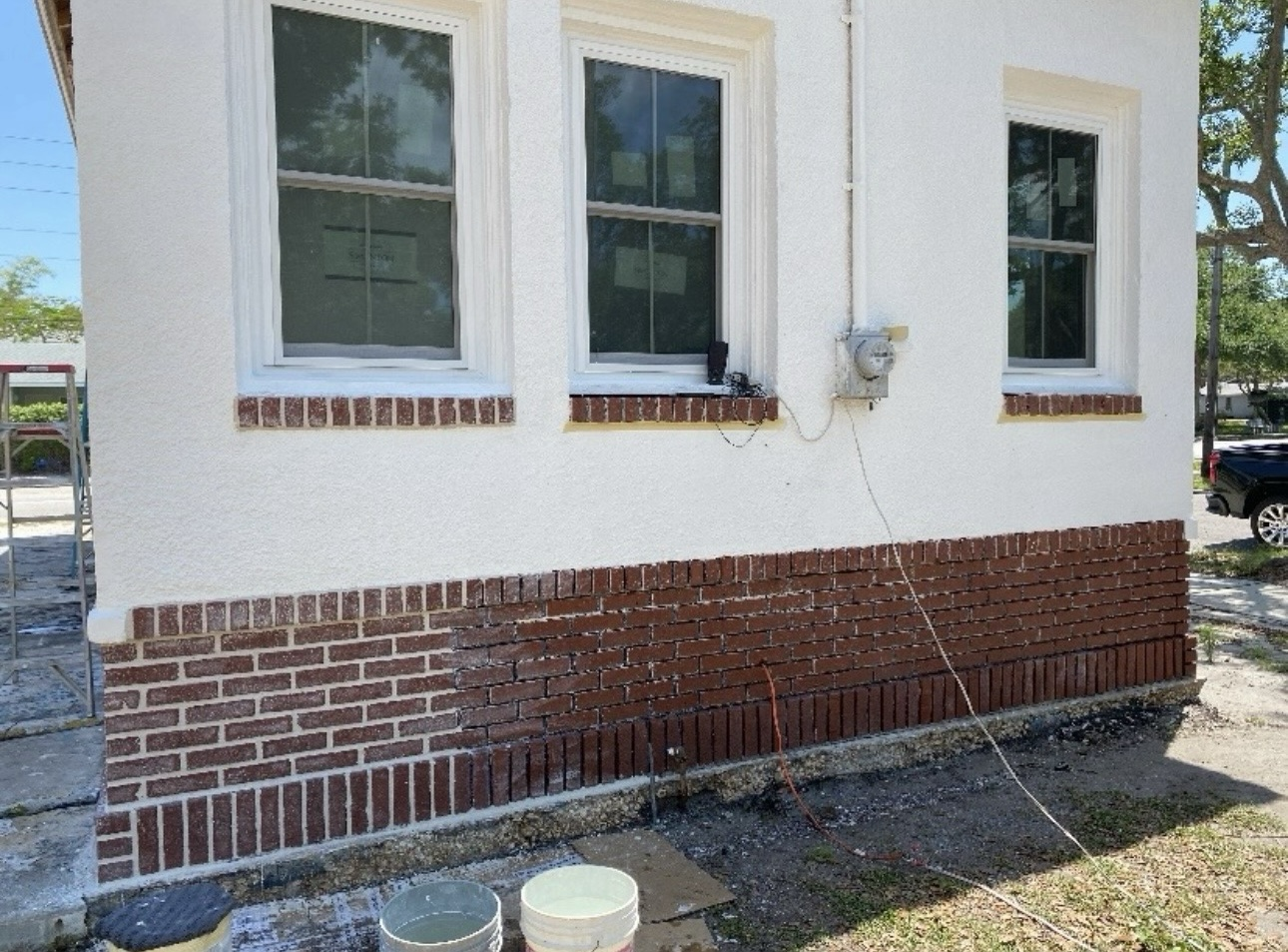
Repointing of the brick water table
