= Sibley's and James Store Historic District =

Historic commercial building in Virginia, United States

- U.S. National Register of Historic Places
- U.S. Historic district
- Virginia Landmarks Register
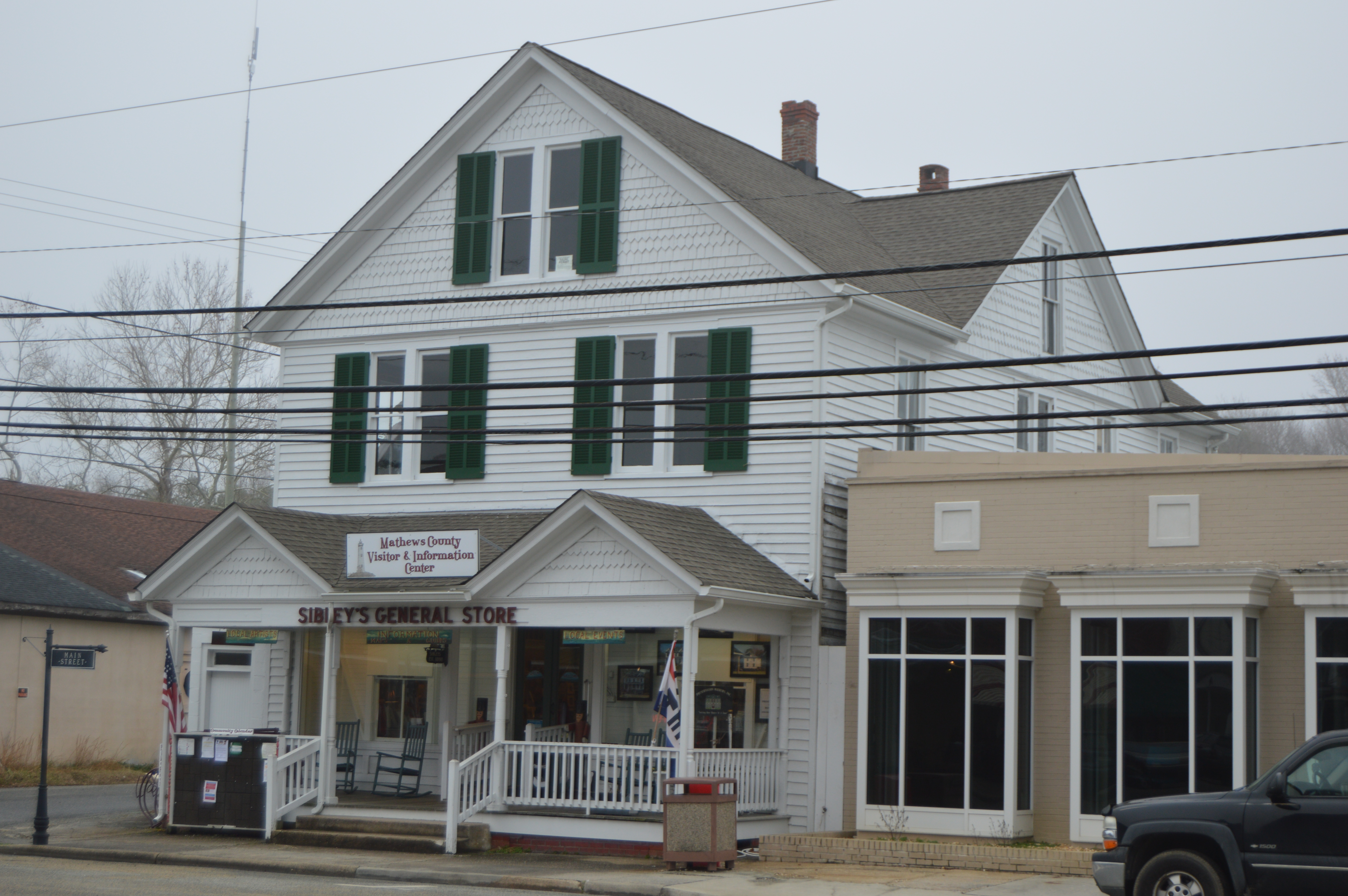
- Front of the Sibley store

- Location within Virginia Location within the United States
- Location: 239 Main St. (Main and Maple Sts.), Mathews, Virginia
- Coordinates: 37°26′1″N 76°19′15″W
- Area: 0.1 acres (0.040 ha)
- Built: 1810
- NRHP reference No.: 10000093
- VLR No.: 057-5049

Significant dates
- Added to NRHP: March 24, 2010
- Designated VLR: December 17, 2009

Sibley's and James Store Historic District is a national historic district located at Mathews, Mathews County, Virginia. It encompasses two contributing buildings, known variously as the Sibley Brothers General Store (1899), the separately listed Old Thomas James Store (c. 1820), and The Old Store. One of the buildings consists of two sections that were originally two separate buildings, but is now connected to Sibley's by a hyphen. The Sibley's General Store was constructed in 1899, and is a 2 1/2-story folk Victorian wood-frame building with a full front porch, weatherboard exterior cladding, and wood-shingle decoration at the eaves. It is connected by a hyphen to a one-story, wood-frame building built about 1840.

It was listed on the National Register of Historic Places in 2010.
