= Standard Oil Service Station =

- U.S. National Register of Historic Places
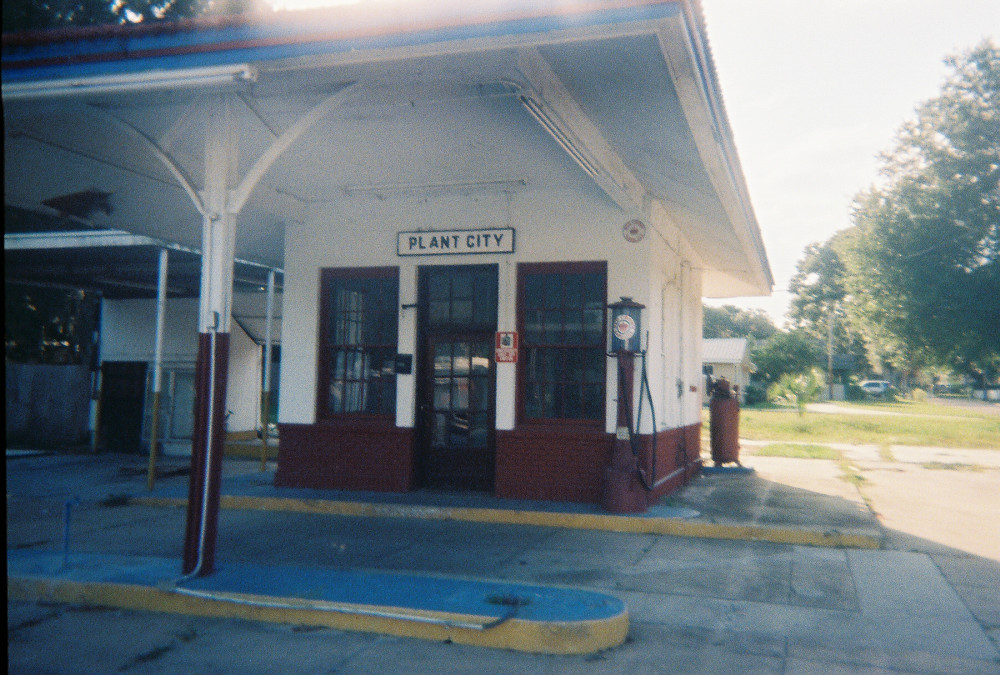

- Location within Florida Location within the United States
- Location: Plant City, Hillsborough County, Florida
- Coordinates: 28°1′29″N 82°7′35″W
- Built: 1921
- NRHP reference No.: 96000974
- Added to NRHP: September 6, 1996

The Standard Oil Service Station (also known as the Daniel's Standard Oil Service Station) is an historic service station site in Plant City, Florida, United States. It is located at 1111 North Wheeler Street, on the southwest corner of Wheeler and Cherry Streets. On September 6, 1996, it was added to the U.S. National Register of Historic Places. The station currently houses a pet store and grooming business.

== See also ==
- Standard Oil Gasoline Station (Odell, Illinois)
- Standard Oil Gasoline Station (Plainfield, Illinois)
- Standard Oil Gasoline Station (Bowling Green, Kentucky)
- St. Petersburg Standard Oil Station
- National Register of Historic Places listings in Hillsborough County, Florida
