= Whittier station =

- Southern Pacific Railroad Depot, Whittier
- U.S. National Register of Historic Places
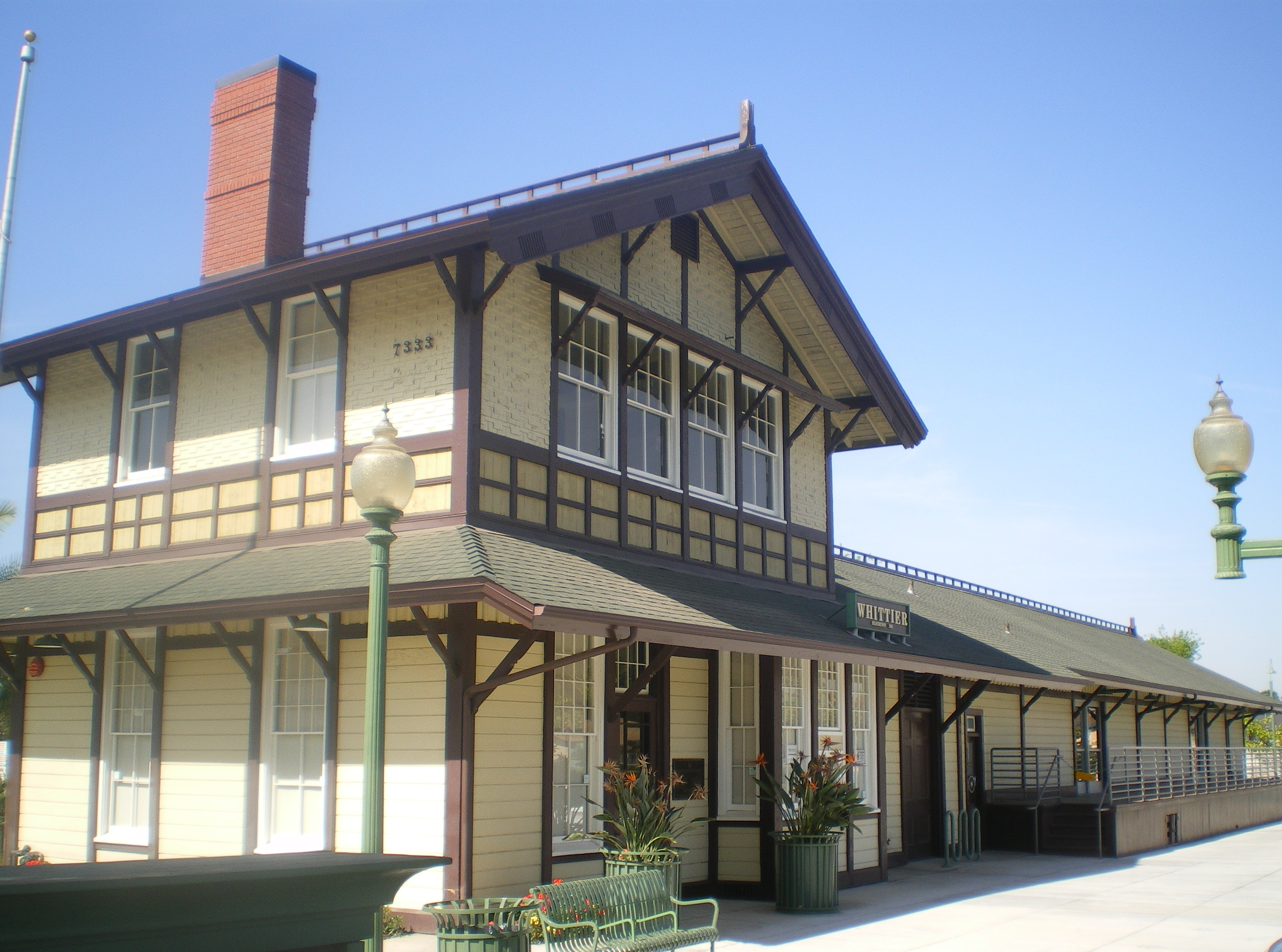
- Southern Pacific Railroad Depot, 2008

- Location within the Los Angeles metropolitan area Location within California Location within the United States
- Location: 7333 Greenleaf Ave; Whittier, California
- Coordinates: 33°58′28″N 118°2′15″W
- Architect: Southern Pacific Railroad
- Architectural style: Stick-Eastlake
- NRHP reference No.: 78000701, 04001105
- Added to NRHP: March 29, 2005

Southern Pacific Railroad Depot in Whittier, California is a train depot built in 1892 that is being preserved by the City of Whittier to house a railroad museum and community center. The depot is a rectangular two-story, wood-frame building. The station agent lived in the second floor apartment.

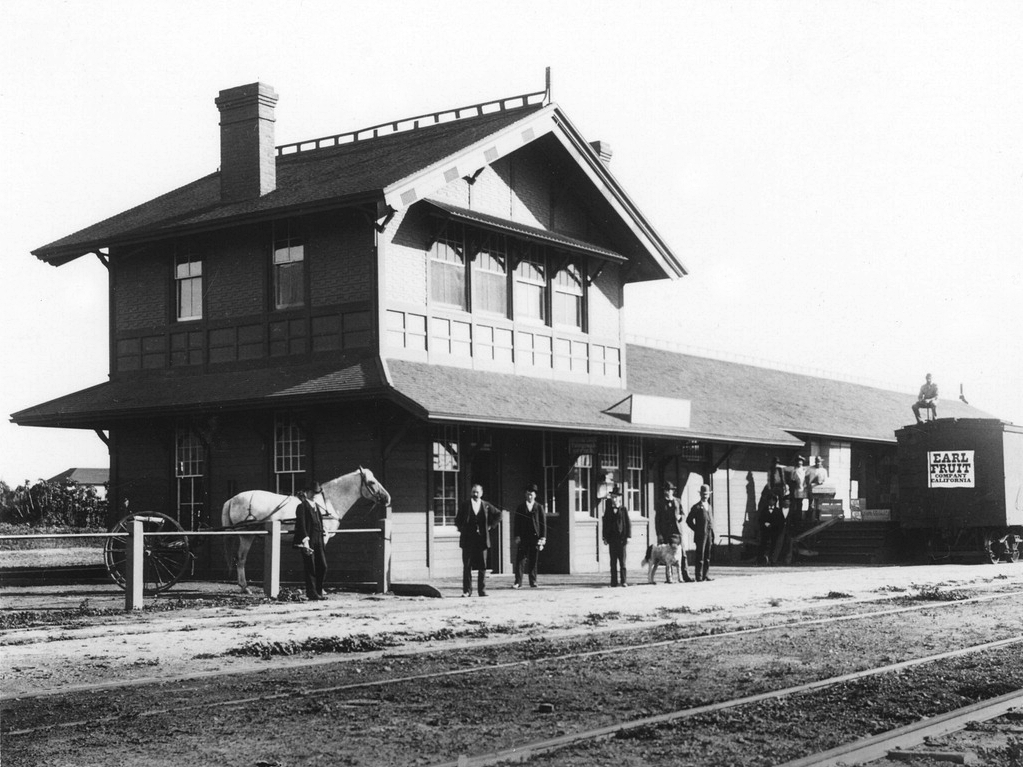
Depot in 1896

In the 1890s the growth of Whittier caused the Southern Pacific Railroad to build a branch line from its main line in Santa Fe Springs, California. The depot was originally built at 11825 Bailey Street. The branch served local citrus packing houses and a gas works. In the early 1900s, the Pacific Electric Railway built a branch line that paralleled the Southern Pacific track.

With the arrival of the automobile, passenger traffic on the Pacific Electric decreased, and in 1938 the Pacific Electric ceased service to Whittier. The Southern Pacific then abandoned its tracks and took over the Pacific Electric tracks and extended them to the station. The Southern Pacific continued providing freight train service to Whittier until 1967. From 1967 until the mid-1980s, the Southern Pacific Depot was occupied by various industrial tenants.

On July 1, 1978, the depot was first listed in the National Register of Historic Places. In the mid-1980s, plans began to develop for the restoration and preservation of the depot. The City took possession of the depot and after several years of neglect, the city received a $1.2 million grant to restore and reuse the depot. The depot was ultimately moved to 7333 Greenleaf Ave., near the Uptown Business District. Because of the move, the depot was removed from the National Register on October 1, 2004. The depot was subsequently relisted at its present location on March 29, 2005.
