= Standard Oil Building (Whittier, California) =

Historic building in Whittier, California

- U.S. National Register of Historic Places
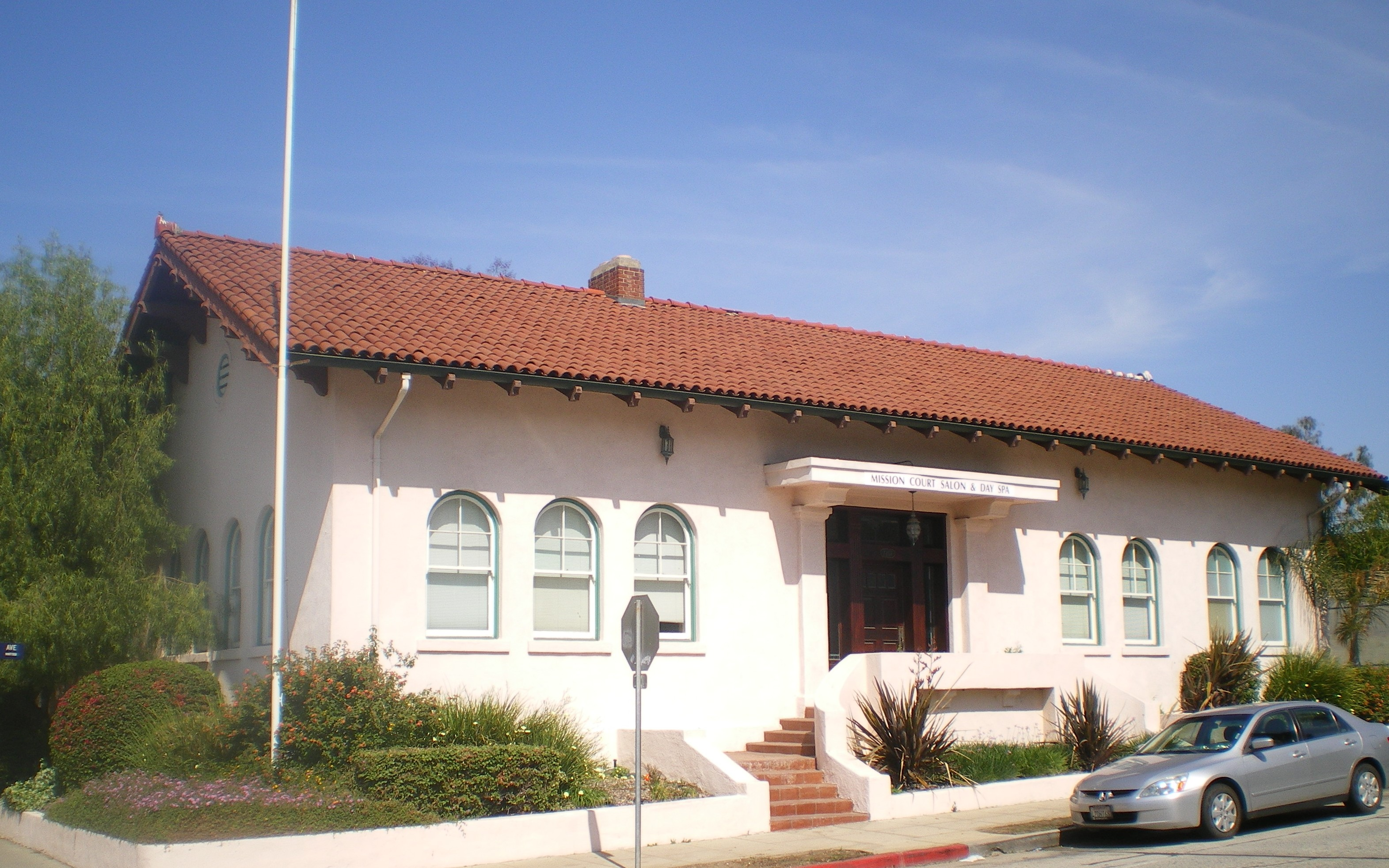
- Standard Oil Building, 2008

- Location within the Los Angeles metropolitan area Location within California Location within the United States
- Location: 7257 Bright Avenue, Whittier, California
- Coordinates: 33.97582°N 118.03634°W
- Built: 1914
- Architect: Rea & Garstang; Davis, A.J.
- Architectural style: Spanish Colonial Revival
- NRHP reference No.: 80000816
- Added to NRHP: June 9, 1980

Standard Oil Building is a historic building in Whittier, California. Built in 1914, it was designed by Rea & Garstang in the Spanish Colonial Revival architectural style. The building was built for the Standard Oil Company, which had begun successfully drilling for oil in 1910 in the area. The building was added to the National Register of Historic Places in 1980, and is now used as a restaurant, beauty salon, and day spa.

The Standard Oil Building refers to a small complex of buildings around a courtyard; the first-built portion, built in 1914, is Mission Style 32 feet (9.8 m) tall and 68 by 34 feet (21 m × 10 m) in plan.
