= Standard Oil Company Filling Station =

- U.S. National Register of Historic Places
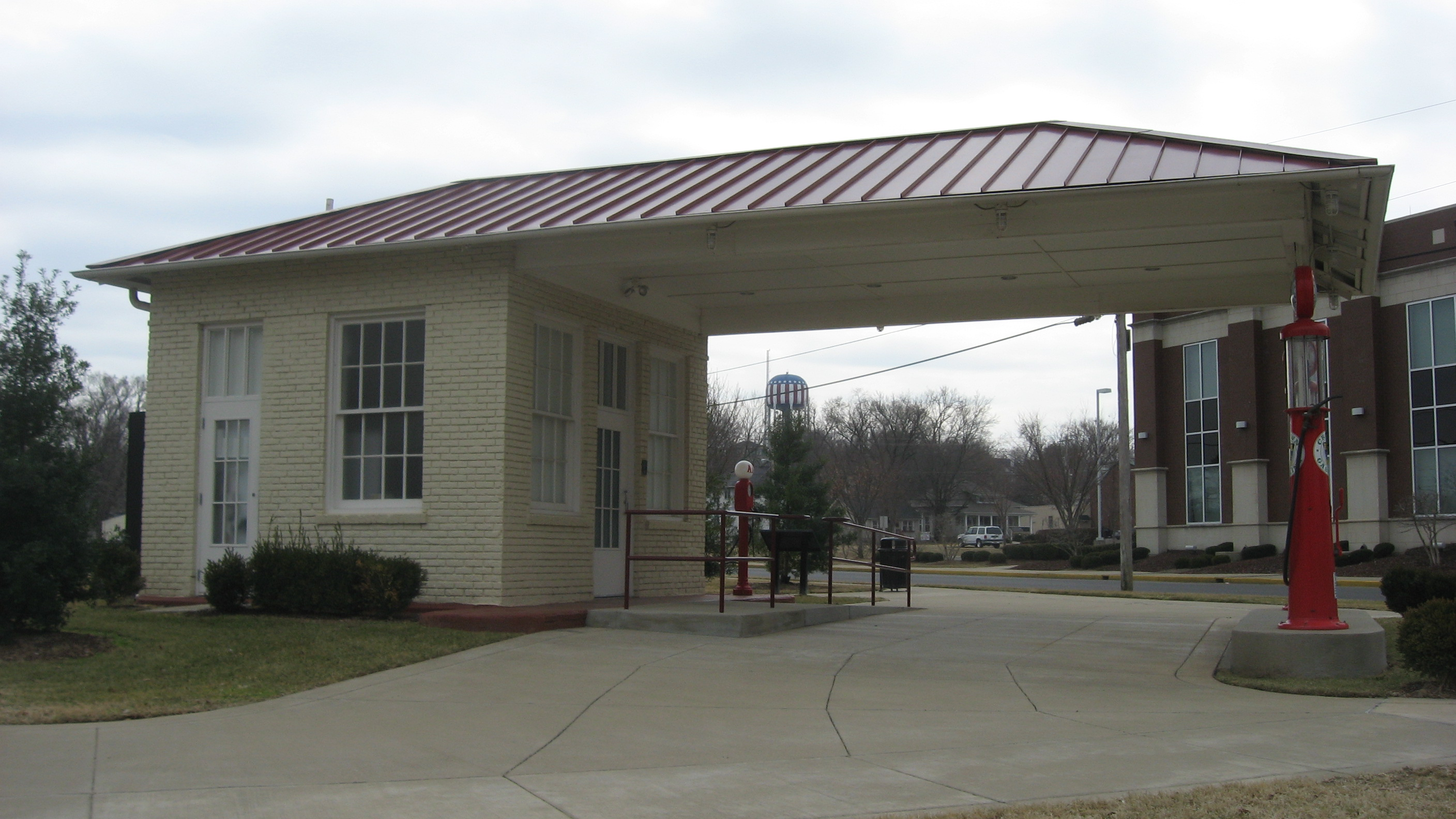

- Location within Kentucky Location within the United States
- Location: 638 College St, Bowling Green, Kentucky
- Coordinates: 36°59′44″N 86°26′20″W
- Area: 0.1 acres (0.040 ha)
- Built: 1921
- Architectural style: Early Commercial
- NRHP reference No.: 10000526
- Added to NRHP: August 5, 2010

The Standard Oil Company Filling Station at 638 College St. in Bowling Green, Kentucky was built in 1921 by Standard Oil of Kentucky. It was listed on the National Register of Historic Places in 2010.

It was operated as a filling station until 1956. The station was renovated and reopened as public restrooms for the adjacent Circus Square Park in 2009.

The renovation included having reproduction Red Crown Gasoline globes made, funded by the Landmark Association.

== See also ==
- Standard Oil Gasoline Station (Plant City, Florida)
- Standard Oil Gasoline Station (Odell, Illinois)
- Standard Oil Gasoline Station (Plainfield, Illinois)
- St. Petersburg Standard Oil Station
- National Register of Historic Places listings in Warren County, Kentucky
