= Standard Oil Gasoline Station (Plainfield, Illinois) =

- U.S. National Register of Historic Places
- U.S. Historic district – Contributing property
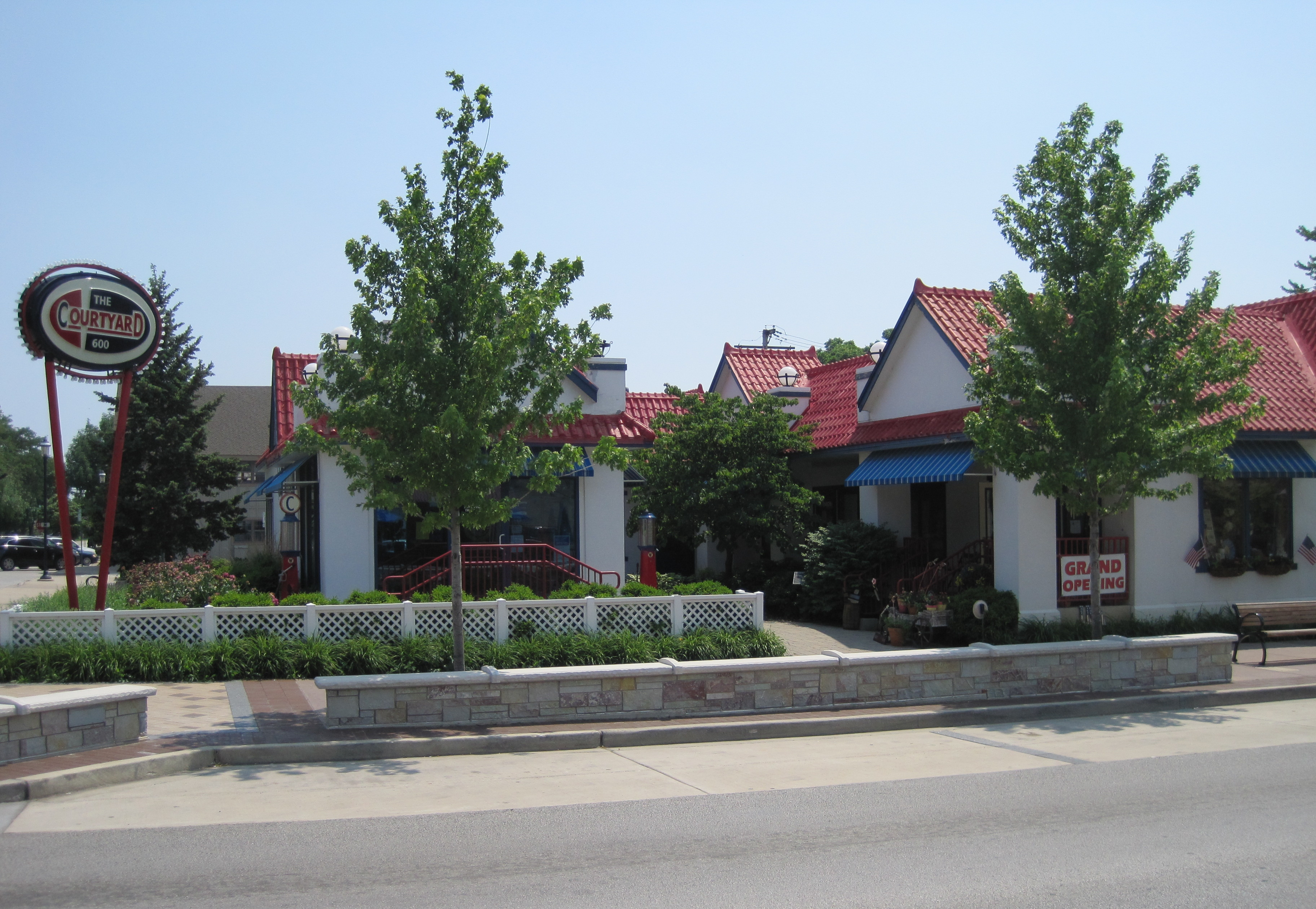
- Standard Oil Gasoline Station building in 2011

- Location within Illinois Location within the United States
- Location: 600 West Lockport Street; Plainfield, Will County, Illinois, United States
- Coordinates: 41°36′29″N 88°12′20″W
- Built: 1932
- Part of: Downtown Plainfield Historic District (ID13000719)
- NRHP reference No.: 84000340

Significant dates
- Added to NRHP: November 13, 1984
- Designated CP: September 18, 2013

The Standard Oil Gasoline Station is a historic building once used as a gas station in Plainfield, Illinois.

== History ==
The Lincoln Highway was the first paved road in Plainfield. As the first transcontinental road in America, the road saw very heavy usage and was re-designated U.S. Route 30 in the 1920s. From 1940 to 1957, U.S. Route 66 ran concurrently with US 30 on the same section of Lincoln Highway through Plainfield, creating substantial traffic. Plainfield's location on the routes made it a prime location for refuelling stations.

The station is a fusion of the "Domestic" and "Spanish" style gas stations that Standard Oil designed in the early 20th century. The Domestic elements were intended to represent a cottage, promoting a mom-and-pop atmosphere, while the Spanish style incorporated southwestern architecture. Like most Standard Oil stations at the time, the color scheme was red, white, and blue.

Built during the Great Depression, the Plainfield station features less ornamentation than stations during the 1920s due to economic concerns; instead, large panes of plate glass were used along the sides of the station. The station was added to the National Register of Historic Places on November 13, 1984. It is a contributing property to the Downtown Plainfield Historic District.

== Architecture ==
The brick building has a stucco finish. The original metal roofing is intact. A small addition, built from cement block with a flat roof, was later constructed as a car wash. Four piers emerge from the roof and are decorated with glass-globed electric lights; the north two piers are further ornamented with a simple belt course. The two wooden doors have recessed panels below a window. The paint scheme was at one point changed to orange and yellow, but has been changed back to its original red, white and blue.

== See also ==
- Standard Oil Gasoline Station (Plant City, Florida)
- Standard Oil Gasoline Station (Odell, Illinois)
- Standard Oil Gasoline Station (Bowling Green, Kentucky)
- National Register of Historic Places listings in Will County, Illinois
