= Orin Jordan House =

Historic house in California, United States

- U.S. National Register of Historic Places
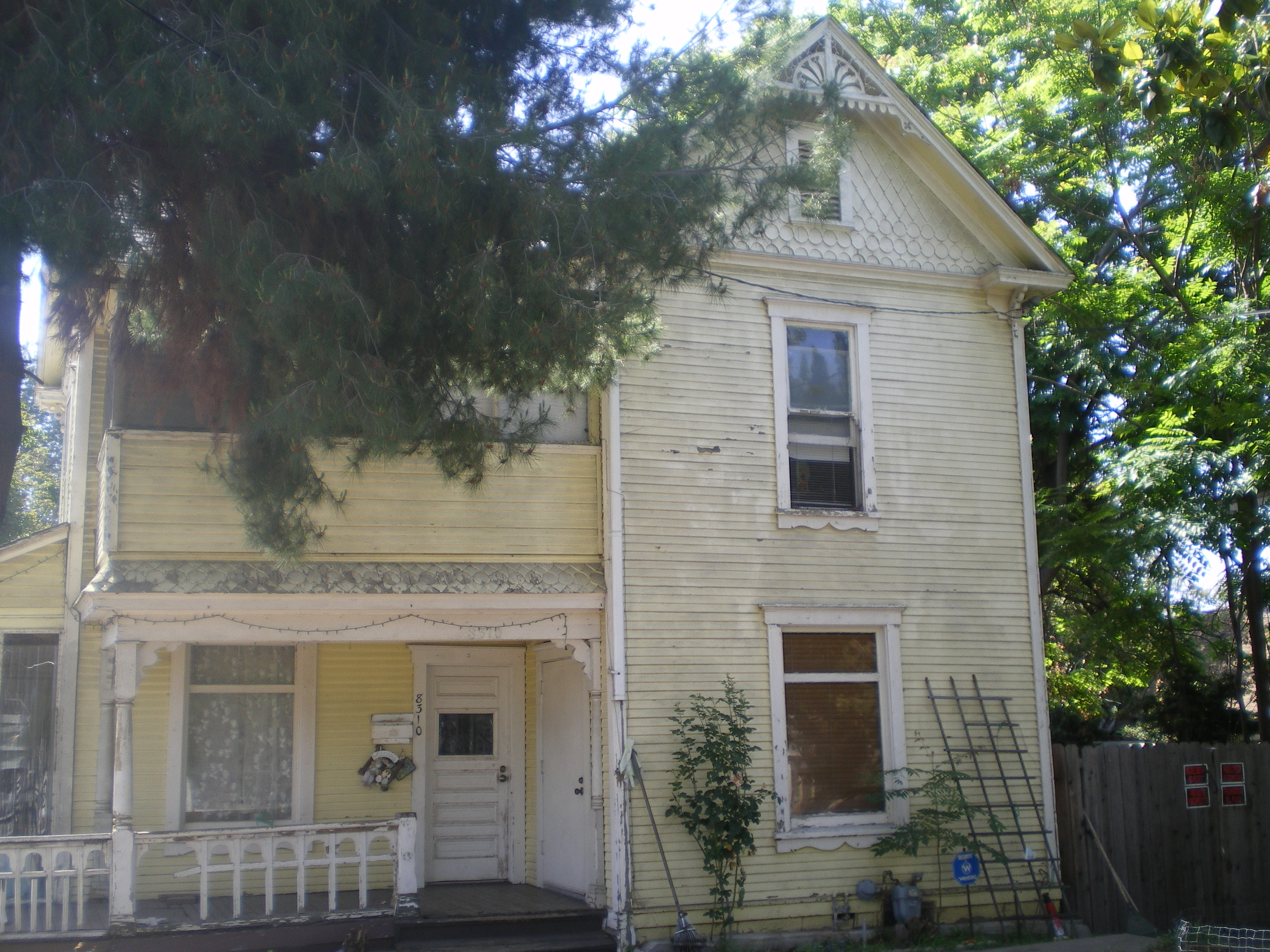
- Orin Jordan House, 2008

- Location within the Los Angeles metropolitan area Location within California Location within the United States
- Location: Whittier, California
- Coordinates: 33°57′54″N 118°2′20″W
- Area: 0.3 acres (0.12 ha)
- Built: 1888
- Architect: Orin Jordan
- Architectural style: Victorian
- NRHP reference No.: 80000815
- Added to NRHP: July 28, 1980

The Orin Jordan House is a Victorian house in Whittier, California that was built in 1888 by Orin Jordan. Also known as the "Old Jordan House" and the "Whitaker Home", the house is located at 8310 S. Comstock Ave.

It was built as a 29.75 by 38 feet (9.07 m × 11.58 m) two-story ell-shaped wood-frame house, with nine rooms.

The house was moved in 1926 by about 300 feet (91 m) to the southwest, to its present location on Comstock.

The Orin Jordan House was added to the National Register of Historic Places in 1980.

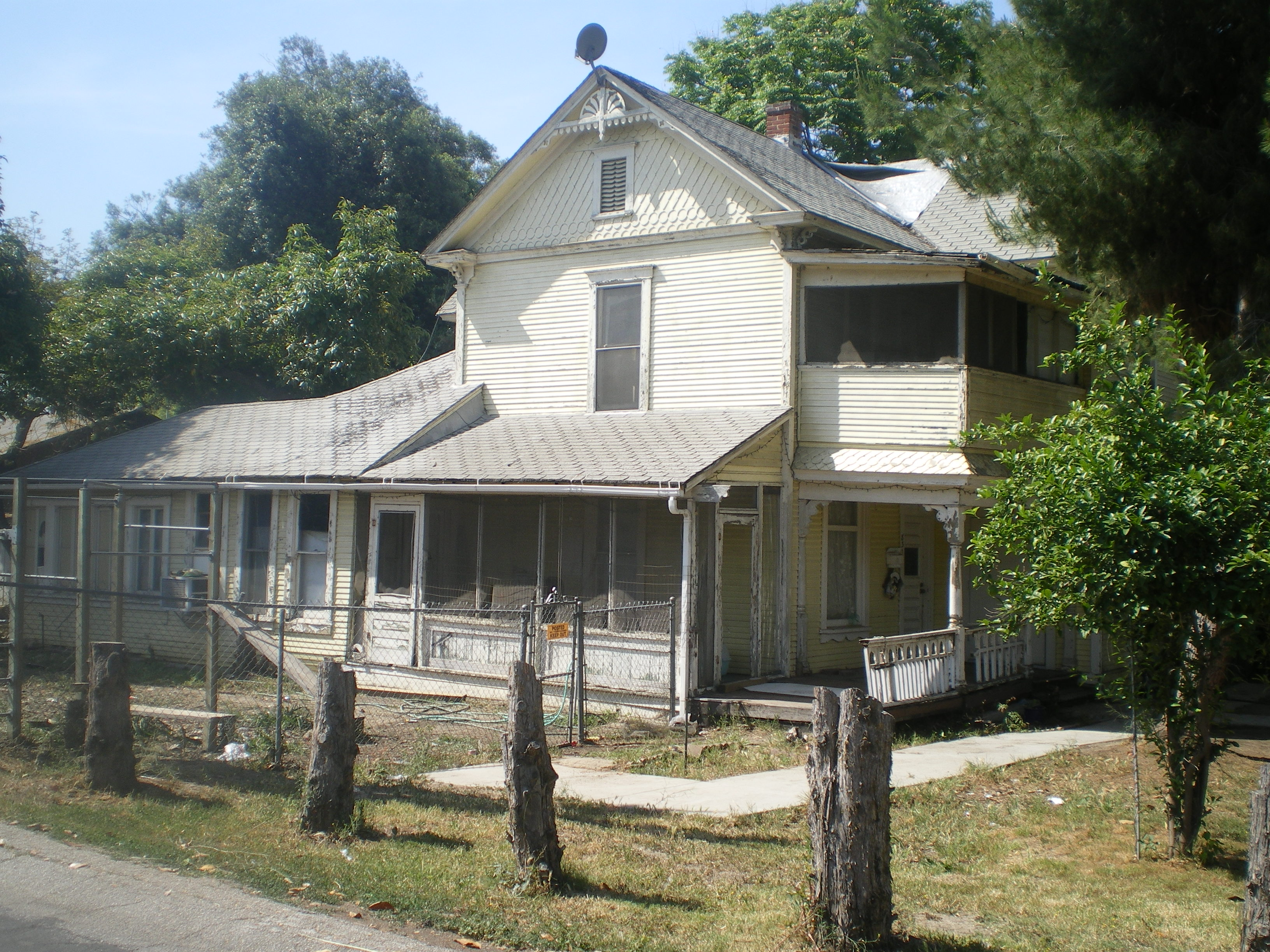
Orin Jordan House, side view
