= Standard Oil Gasoline Station (Odell, Illinois) =

- U.S. National Register of Historic Places
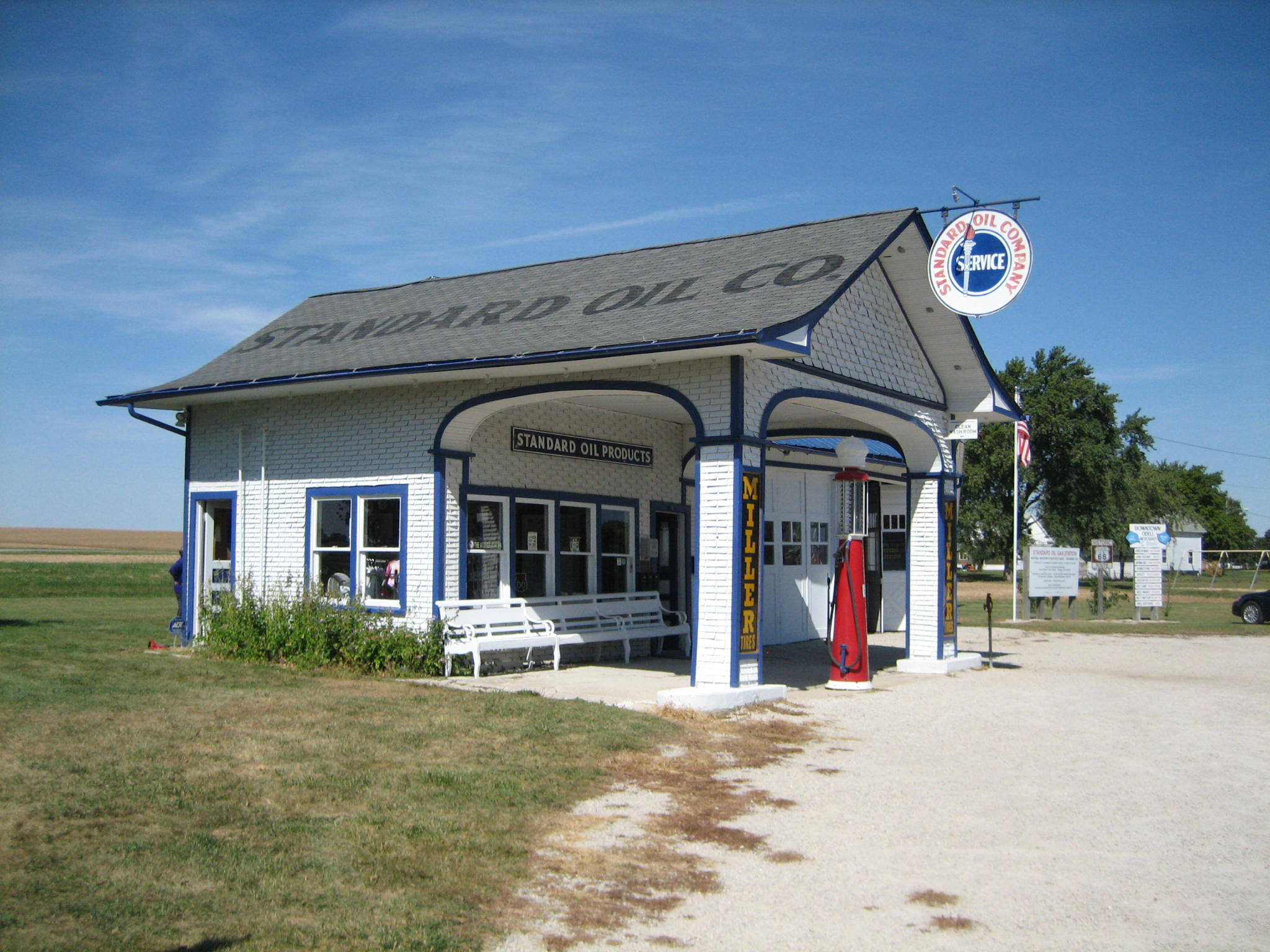
- The restored Standard Oil Station in Odell, Illinois.
- Location: Odell, Livingston County, Illinois, USA
- Coordinates: 41°0′6.99″N 88°31′44.67″W
- Built: 1932
- MPS: Historic and Architectural Resources of Route 66 Through Illinois
- NRHP reference No.: 97001338
- Added to NRHP: November 9, 1997

The Standard Oil Gasoline Station is a historic gas station in Odell, Illinois, that lies along historic U.S. Route 66. Before the days of the interstate highway system the station served patrons along the highway's cross country jaunt. It is fairly typical of gas stations along the historic corridor.

== History ==
The station was built in 1932 when a contractor, Patrick O'Donnell purchased the small 200-foot (61 m) by 60-foot (18 m) piece of land the station stands on. The land lies on the southwest side of the Livingston County town. O'Donnell's plan was to build a gas station that he could lease to his son. The project went ahead and the station was modeled after a 1916 Standard Oil of Ohio design. The station is of the house and canopy style and includes work bays which were clearly added at a later date. Upon careful inspection the interior walls of the bays reveal the later origin. The station continued to sell Standard Oil products for its first several years but by 1940 it had switched to Phillips 66 brands. At least nine other stations besides O'Donnell's dotted this part of Route 66 through Odell, the competition drove the addition of the bays by the 1940s. Between 1940 and 1952 the station underwent a number of changes.

At one point, the station went from Phillips 66 to Sinclair products. Eventually, in 1952, Robert Close leased the station from O'Donnell. When O'Donnell died, Close purchased the property from his estate. He moved his family into the adjacent cafe which had been converted into a house. They stayed there until it burned in the 1970s. Close continued to do body work at the station until 1999. It was that year that the Village of Odell purchased the station for the express purpose of historic restoration. The Route 66 Association of Illinois took interest in the project and nominated the property for inclusion on the National Register of Historic Places, a status it was granted on November 9. 1997.

Route 66 began to decline as early as the mid-1940s. A bypass was constructed around Odell in 1946, traffic was directed around the strip that held the gas stations and businesses started to disappear. The O'Donnell station persisted until 1967, largely because it offered services as well as gasoline.

== See also ==
- Standard Oil Gasoline Station (Plant City, Florida)
- Standard Oil Gasoline Station (Plainfield, Illinois)
- Standard Oil Gasoline Station (Bowling Green, Kentucky)
- National Register of Historic Places listings in Livingston County, Illinois
