= National Register of Historic Places listings in Los Angeles County, California =

Location of Los Angeles County in California

The properties and districts listed here are those on the National Register of Historic Places in Los Angeles County, California, excluding those in the cities of Los Angeles and Pasadena. The locations of National Register properties and districts for which the latitude and longitude coordinates are included, and may be seen in an online map.

There are 623 properties and districts listed on the National Register in the county, including 21 National Historic Landmarks. More than 250 of these properties and districts, including 11 National Historic Landmarks are located in the city of Los Angeles, and are listed separately. 130 of these properties and districts, including 5 National Historic Landmarks, are in the city of Pasadena, and are also listed separately. The 202 properties and districts located elsewhere in the county, including 5 National Historic Landmarks, are listed here. A single district, the Arroyo Seco Parkway Historic District, passes through both cities and other parts of the county. Another 6 properties, including 5 outside these two cities, were once listed on the National Register but have been removed.

This National Park Service list is complete through NPS recent listings posted November 6, 2026.

== Current listings ==
	Name on the Register	Image	Date listed	Location	City or town	Description
1	Adamson House	Adamson House	October 28, 1977 (#77000298)	23200 W. Pacific Coast Highway; 34°02′04″N 118°40′42″W	Malibu	
2	Adobe Flores	Adobe Flores	June 18, 1973 (#73000404)	1804 Foothill St. 34°07′11″N 118°08′41″W	South Pasadena	
3	Alexander Theatre	Alexander Theatre	February 16, 1996 (#96000102)	216 N. Brand Blvd. 34°08′57″N 118°15′12″W	Glendale	
4	Anderton Court Shops	Anderton Court Shops	May 14, 2004 (#03000987)	332 N.Rodeo Dr. 34°04′06″N 118°24′03″W	Beverly Hills	Frank Lloyd Wright
5	Antelope Valley Indian Museum	Antelope Valley Indian Museum	February 26, 1987 (#87000509)	15701 East Ave. 34°39′01″N 117°50′56″W	Lancaster	Chalet-style building set into rock formations, originally as a home
6	Ard Eevin	Ard Eevin	November 21, 2006 (#06001087)	851 W. Mountain St. 34°10′37″N 118°16′13″W	Glendale	
7	Arroyo Seco Parkway Historic District	Arroyo Seco Parkway Historic District	February 4, 2011 (#10001198)	CA 110 from Four Level Interchange in Los Angeles to East Glenarm St. in Pasadena; 34°07′39″N 118°08′50″W	Downtown Los Angeles to Pasadena	The Arroyo Seco Parkway Historic District passes through South Pasadena
8	Atchison, Topeka, and Santa Fe Railroad Station	Atchison, Topeka, and Santa Fe Railroad Station	July 15, 1982 (#82002188)	110 W. 1st St. 34°05′39″N 117°42′58″W	Claremont	Spanish Colonial Revival train station built in 1927, now an art museum
9	Auditorium	Auditorium	October 13, 1983 (#83003499)	2200 W. Carson; 33°49′48″N 118°19′11″W	Torrance	
10	Aztec Hotel	Aztec Hotel	May 22, 1978 (#78000691)	311 W. Foothill Blvd. 34°09′06″N 118°00′18″W	Monrovia	
11	Azusa Civic Center	Azusa Civic Center	February 21, 2002 (#02000034)	213 Foothill Blvd. 34°08′03″N 117°54′18″W	Azusa	
12	Jonathan Bailey House	Jonathan Bailey House	August 29, 1977 (#77000304)	13421 E. Camilla St. 33°59′05″N 118°01′53″W	Whittier	
13	Bay Street Beach Historic District	Bay Street Beach Historic District	June 26, 2019 (#100004116)	Roughly bounded by Pacific Ocean, Ocean Front Walk from Vicente Ter. to Crescent Bay Park, Bicknell Ave. extending into ocean. 34°00′23″N 118°29′31″W	Santa Monica	
14	Beverly Hills Women's Club	Beverly Hills Women's Club	October 4, 2006 (#06000914)	1700 Chevy Chase Dr. 34°05′09″N 118°25′47″W	Beverly Hills	
15	Beverly Wilshire Hotel	Beverly Wilshire Hotel	June 12, 1987 (#87000908)	9528 Wilshire Blvd. 34°04′01″N 118°23′20″W	Beverly Hills	
16	Luther and Adah Blair House		March 25, 2024 (#100010098)	508 S. Ivy Avenue; 34°08′48″N 117°59′55″W	Monrovia	
17	John F. and Julia Brossart House		March 25, 2024 (#100010097)	512 S. Ivy Avenue; 34°08′48″N 117°59′55″W	Monrovia	
18	CA-LAN-1258		October 17, 2012 (#12000861)	Address restricted	Canyon Country	
19	CA-LAN-1302		October 17, 2012 (#12000862)	Address restricted	Azusa	
20	CA-LAN-1946		October 17, 2012 (#12000860)	Address restricted	Acton	
21	CA-LAN-441		October 17, 2012 (#12000863)	Address restricted	Castaic	
22	CA-LAN-540	CA-LAN-540	October 17, 2012 (#12000859)	Address restricted	Agua Dulce	
23	Casa de Parley Johnson	Casa de Parley Johnson	March 20, 1986 (#86000449)	7749 Florence Ave. 33°57′24″N 118°07′57″W	Downey	
24	Case Study House No. 20	Case Study House No. 20	July 24, 2013 (#13000517)	2275 N. Santa Rosa Ave. 34°11′05″N 118°08′20″W	Altadena	One of the Case Study Houses, built in 1958 for Saul Bass.
25	Cedar Avenue Complex		September 30, 1993 (#93001017)	44843 (44855), 44845 and 44851 Cedar Ave., 606 Lancaster Blvd., and Old Jail (no address); 34°41′58″N 118°08′20″W	Lancaster	
26	Charmont Apartments	Charmont Apartments	July 25, 1996 (#96000777)	330 California Ave. 34°01′12″N 118°29′58″W	Santa Monica	
27	Chicano Moratorium March December 20, 1969		October 30, 2020 (#100002655)	Five Points Memorial, North Indiana St., Michigan Ave., Obregon Park; 34°02′17″N 118°11′33″W	East Los Angeles	
28	Christian Science Society		July 10, 2017 (#100001281)	209 E. Whittley Ave. 33°20′39″N 118°19′41″W	Avalon	
29	Christmas Tree Lane	Christmas Tree Lane	September 13, 1990 (#90001444)	Santa Rosa Ave. between Woodbury Ave. and Altadena Dr. 34°11′25″N 118°08′09″W	Altadena	
30	Citizen Publishing Company Building	Citizen Publishing Company Building	February 12, 1987 (#87000082)	9355 Culver Blvd. 34°01′31″N 118°23′35″W	Culver City	
31	City Hall-City of Burbank	City Hall-City of Burbank	April 18, 1996 (#96000426)	275 E. Olive Ave. 34°10′55″N 118°18′27″W	Burbank	
32	Clarke Estate	Clarke Estate	January 4, 1990 (#89002267)	10211 Pioneer Blvd. 33°56′36″N 118°04′52″W	Santa Fe Springs	
33	Club Casa Del Mar	Club Casa Del Mar	September 29, 2000 (#00001169)	1910 Ocean Ave. 34°00′23″N 118°29′25″W	Santa Monica	
34	Colonial House	Colonial House	April 15, 1982 (#82002190)	1416 N. Havenhurst Dr. 34°05′45″N 118°21′35″W	West Hollywood	
35	Community Clubhouse	Community Clubhouse	July 23, 2013 (#13000510)	1200 N. Vista St. 34°05′37″N 118°21′04″W	West Hollywood	
36	Cooper Arms	Cooper Arms	December 28, 2000 (#00001538)	455 E. Ocean Blvd. 33°46′01″N 118°11′13″W	Long Beach	
37	Crank House	Crank House	July 23, 1997 (#97000751)	2186 Crary St. 34°10′21″N 118°06′20″W	Altadena	
38	Culver Hotel	Culver Hotel	April 14, 1997 (#97000296)	9400 Culver Blvd. 34°01′24″N 118°23′38″W	Culver City	
39	James Daniel Derby House	James Daniel Derby House	December 14, 1978 (#78000682)	2535 E. Chevy Chase Dr. 34°09′41″N 118°12′38″W	Glendale	
40	Descanso Gardens	Descanso Gardens	April 19, 2021 (#100005157)	1418 Descanso Dr. 34°12′05″N 118°12′35″W	La Cañada Flintridge	
41	DeWenter Mansion, Guest House and Grounds		November 5, 1992 (#92001559)	6100 Brydon Rd. 34°09′07″N 117°45′23″W	La Verne	
42	Diamond Apartments	Diamond Apartments	March 26, 1992 (#92000260)	321 Diamond St. 33°50′39″N 118°23′16″W	Redondo Beach	
43	Doctors House	Doctors House	September 21, 2023 (#100009362)	1601 West Mountain St. (Brand Park); 34°10′57″N 118°16′36″W	Glendale	
44	Doheny Estate/Greystone Mansion	Doheny Estate/Greystone Mansion	April 23, 1976 (#76000485)	905 Loma Vista Dr. 34°05′31″N 118°24′01″W	Beverly Hills	
45	Dominguez Rancho Adobe	Dominguez Rancho Adobe	May 28, 1976 (#76000486)	18127 S. Alameda St. 33°52′01″N 118°13′03″W	Compton	
46	Peter Drucker House	Peter Drucker House	December 18, 2017 (#100001890)	636 Wellesley Dr. 34°06′38″N 117°43′31″W	Claremont	Home of Peter Drucker
47	Edison Historic District	Edison Historic District	August 13, 1986 (#86001477)	611, 637, and 500 block of W. Second St. 34°03′28″N 117°45′13″W	Pomona	
48	El Molino Viejo	El Molino Viejo	May 6, 1971 (#71000154)	1120 Old Mill Rd. 34°07′08″N 118°07′41″W	San Marino	Water-driven grist mill built ca. 1816; oldest commercial building in Southern California
49	El Segundo Woman's Club	El Segundo Woman's Club	May 30, 2023 (#100009028)	541 Standard St. 33°55′24″N 118°24′54″W	El Segundo	
50	Katherine Emery Estate	Katherine Emery Estate	January 10, 2011 (#10001118)	1155 Oak Grove Ave. 34°07′31″N 118°07′38″W	San Marino	
51	Episcopal Church of the Ascension	Episcopal Church of the Ascension	August 19, 1977 (#77000303)	25 E. Laurel Ave. 34°09′58″N 118°03′04″W	Sierra Madre	
52	Gen. Charles S. Farnsworth County Park	Gen. Charles S. Farnsworth County Park	February 7, 1997 (#97000027)	568 E. Mt. Curve Ave. 34°11′59″N 118°07′54″W	Altadena	
53	Federal Building	Federal Building	April 28, 2015 (#15000169)	15000 Aviation Blvd. 33°53′42″N 118°22′40″W	Hawthorne	
54	Fern Avenue School	Fern Avenue School	February 20, 1992 (#92000067)	1314 Fern Ave. 33°50′06″N 118°19′52″W	Torrance	
55	First Congregational Church of Long Beach	First Congregational Church of Long Beach	September 25, 2012 (#12000810)	241 Cedar Ave. 33°46′13″N 118°11′42″W	Long Beach	
56	First National Bank of Long Beach	First National Bank of Long Beach	September 13, 1990 (#90001432)	101-125 Pine Ave. 33°46′06″N 118°11′30″W	Long Beach	
57	Forum	Forum	September 24, 2014 (#14000661)	3900 Manchester Blvd. 33°57′29″N 118°20′31″W	Inglewood	
58	Fox Theatre Inglewood	Fox Theatre Inglewood	January 14, 2013 (#12001163)	115 N. Market St. 33°57′48″N 118°21′08″W	Inglewood	
59	Fox Wilshire Theatre	Fox Wilshire Theatre	April 3, 2012 (#12000164)	8440 Wilshire Blvd. 34°03′53″N 118°22′30″W	Beverly Hills	
60	Peter Gano House	Peter Gano House	September 15, 1983 (#83001194)	718 Crescent Ave. 33°20′34″N 118°19′20″W	Avalon	
61	Garfield House	Garfield House	April 24, 1973 (#73000405)	1001 Buena Vista St. 34°07′14″N 118°09′21″W	South Pasadena	
62	Glendale Southern Pacific Railroad Depot	Glendale Southern Pacific Railroad Depot	May 2, 1997 (#97000376)	Gardena Ave., junction with W. Cerritos Ave. 34°07′25″N 118°15′29″W	Glendale	
63	Glendale Young Men's Christian Association	Glendale Young Men's Christian Association	October 21, 1994 (#94001224)	140 N. Louise St. 34°08′52″N 118°15′04″W	Glendale	
64	Glendora Bougainvillea	Glendora Bougainvillea	February 7, 1978 (#78000683)	Bennett and Minnesota Aves. 34°08′27″N 117°51′34″W	Glendora	
65	Grand Central Air Terminal	Grand Central Air Terminal	March 27, 2017 (#100000780)	1310 Air Way; 34°09′47″N 118°17′12″W	Glendale	
66	Green-Rankin-Bembridge House	Green-Rankin-Bembridge House	February 10, 2005 (#05000002)	953 Park Circle Dr. 33°46′45″N 118°12′04″W	Long Beach	
67	Barbara Greenwood Kindergarten	Barbara Greenwood Kindergarten	September 18, 1978 (#78000697)	Hacienda Pl. and McKinley Ave. 34°04′32″N 117°45′19″W	Pomona	
68	Zane Grey Estate	Zane Grey Estate	October 24, 2002 (#02001187)	396 E. Mariposa St. 34°11′26″N 118°08′30″W	Altadena	Destroyed in the January 2025 Southern California wildfires.
69	Hacienda Arms Apartments	Hacienda Arms Apartments	December 15, 1983 (#83003531)	8439 Sunset Blvd. 34°05′42″N 118°22′24″W	West Hollywood	
70	Olan G. and Aida T. Hafley House	Olan G. and Aida T. Hafley House	July 12, 2011 (#11000429)	5561 E. La Pasada St. 33°46′54″N 118°07′30″W	Long Beach	1953 house designed by Richard Neutra
71	Harrower Laboratory and Clinic		March 31, 2025 (#100011584)	912-920 E. Broadway; 117 S. Belmont Street; 34°08′46″N 118°14′37″W	Glendale	
71	Hawkins-Nimocks Estate-Patricio Ontiveros Adobe	Hawkins-Nimocks Estate-Patricio Ontiveros Adobe	December 31, 1987 (#82004982)	12100 Telegraph Rd. 33°56′22″N 118°04′34″W	Santa Fe Springs	
72	Home Economics Building	Home Economics Building	October 13, 1983 (#83003536)	2200 W. Carson; 33°49′52″N 118°19′16″W	Torrance	
73	Hoover Hotel	Hoover Hotel	February 1, 2002 (#02000074)	7035 Greenleaf Ave. 33°58′41″N 118°02′10″W	Whittier	
74	Horatio West Court	Horatio West Court	April 11, 1977 (#77000302)	140 Hollister Ave. 34°00′12″N 118°29′10″W	Santa Monica	Irving Gill
75	Hotel Glendale	Hotel Glendale	October 7, 1994 (#94001197)	701 E. Broadway; 34°08′48″N 118°14′45″W	Glendale	
76	Edwin Hubble House	Edwin Hubble House	December 8, 1976 (#76000494)	1340 Woodstock Rd. 34°07′23″N 118°07′12″W	San Marino	
77	Humaliwo		September 1, 1976 (#76000492)	Address restricted	Malibu	
78	Hunt House		June 26, 2019 (#100004118)	24514 Malibu Rd. 34°01′50″N 118°42′33″W	Malibu	
79	Intercultural Council Houses	Intercultural Council Houses	April 7, 2015 (#15000121)	Bounded by Blanchard Pl., Claremont Blvd., E. 1st & Brooks Sts. 34°05′45″N 117°42′18″W	Claremont	Site of planned interracial community in the 1940s
80	Darius David Johnston House	Darius David Johnston House	November 2, 1978 (#78000693)	12426 Mapledale St. 33°53′54″N 118°04′02″W	Norwalk	
81	Orin Jordan House	Orin Jordan House	July 28, 1980 (#80000815)	8310 S. Comstock Ave. 33°57′40″N 118°01′59″W	Whittier	
82	Karasik House	Karasik House	December 22, 2011 (#11000933)	436 Spalding Dr. 34°03′28″N 118°24′32″W	Beverly Hills	
83	Keyes Bungalow	Keyes Bungalow	November 14, 1978 (#78000678)	1337 E. Boston St. 34°10′57″N 118°07′22″W	Altadena	
84	Killingsworth, Brady, & Smith	Killingsworth, Brady, & Smith	July 15, 2009 (#09000515)	3827-3837 Long Beach Blvd. 33°49′41″N 118°11′23″W	Long Beach	
85	La Casa Alvarado	La Casa Alvarado	April 19, 1978 (#78000698)	1459 Old Settlers Lane; 34°04′26″N 117°45′19″W	Pomona	
86	La Casa Primera de Rancho San Jose	La Casa Primera de Rancho San Jose	April 3, 1975 (#75000436)	1569 N. Park Ave. 34°04′30″N 117°45′15″W	Pomona	
87	La Laguna de San Gabriel	La Laguna de San Gabriel	January 11, 2017 (#100000462)	300 W. Wells St. 34°05′01″N 118°06′16″W	San Gabriel	
88	La Puente Valley Woman's Club	La Puente Valley Woman's Club	April 29, 1999 (#99000482)	200 N. First St. 34°01′19″N 117°57′05″W	La Puente	
89	Lanterman House	Lanterman House	December 29, 1994 (#94001504)	4420 Encinas Dr. 34°12′16″N 118°12′20″W	La Cañada Flintridge	
90	Leonis Adobe	Leonis Adobe	May 29, 1975 (#75000433)	23537 Calabasas Rd. 34°09′26″N 118°38′24″W	Calabasas	
91	Lincoln Park Historic District	Lincoln Park Historic District	April 9, 2004 (#03001347)	Roughly bounded by McKinley Ave., Towne Ave., Pasadena St. and Garey Ave. 34°04′14″N 117°44′42″W	Pomona	
92	Abraham Lincoln Elementary School	Abraham Lincoln Elementary School	August 3, 1989 (#89000935)	1200 N. Gordon Ave. 34°04′13″N 117°45′08″W	Pomona	
93	Harold Lloyd Estate	Harold Lloyd Estate	February 9, 1984 (#84000876)	1740 Green Acres Drive; 34°05′17″N 118°25′37″W	Beverly Hills	
94	Long Beach Professional Building	Long Beach Professional Building	August 3, 2005 (#05000773)	117 E. 8th St. 33°46′36″N 118°11′32″W	Long Beach	
95	Howard Longley House	Howard Longley House	April 16, 1974 (#74000527)	1005 Buena Vista St. 34°07′14″N 118°09′19″W	South Pasadena	
96	Lopez Adobe	Lopez Adobe	May 6, 1971 (#71000157)	1100 Pico St. 34°16′55″N 118°26′33″W	San Fernando	
97	Los Cerritos Ranch House	Los Cerritos Ranch House	April 15, 1970 (#70000135)	4600 Virginia Rd. 33°50′22″N 118°11′42″W	Long Beach	
98	Lynwood Pacific Electric Railway Depot	Lynwood Pacific Electric Railway Depot	September 25, 1974 (#74000524)	11453 Long Beach Blvd. 33°55′32″N 118°12′34″W	Lynwood	
99	Main Building	Main Building	October 13, 1983 (#83003538)	2200 W. Carson; 33°49′51″N 118°19′13″W	Torrance	
100	Malaga Cove Plaza	Malaga Cove Plaza	October 1, 2021 (#100007016)	Roughly bounded by Palos Verdes Drive West, Vía Tejon, Vía Corta, and Malaga Ln; 33°48′01″N 118°23′21″W	Palos Verdes Estates	
101	Malibu Historic District	Malibu Historic District	January 29, 2018 (#100002022)	Roughly along Pacific Coast from east of Malibu Pier to the Malibu Colony privacy fence 34°02′13″N 118°40′35″W	Malibu	
102	Mariposa Street Bridge	Mariposa Street Bridge	March 25, 2024 (#100010110)	Roughly 10 feet (3.0 m) s. of junction of S. Mariposa St. and W. Valley Heart Dr. 34°09′20″N 118°18′46″W	Burbank	
103	Mayfair Hotel	Mayfair Hotel	July 31, 2017 (#100001382)	115 E. 3rd St. 34°03′26″N 117°44′59″W	Pomona	
104	McNally's Windemere Ranch Headquarters	McNally's Windemere Ranch Headquarters	July 20, 1978 (#78000684)	San Esteban and San Cristobal Dr. 33°53′53″N 118°01′28″W	La Mirada	
105	Andrew McNally House	Andrew McNally House	March 27, 2007 (#07000245)	654 E. Mariposa St. 34°11′20″N 118°08′10″W	Altadena	Destroyed in the January 2025 Southern California wildfires
106	Middough Brothers-Insurance Exchange Building	Middough Brothers-Insurance Exchange Building	February 5, 2003 (#03000002)	205 E. Broadway; 33°46′09″N 118°11′24″W	Long Beach	
107	Isaac Milbank House		July 21, 2023 (#100009159)	236 Adelaide Dr. 34°01′45″N 118°30′48″W	Santa Monica	
108	Miltimore House	Miltimore House	March 24, 1972 (#72000235)	1301 S. Chelten Way; 34°06′41″N 118°08′30″W	South Pasadena	
109	Mirlo Gate Lodge Tower	Mirlo Gate Lodge Tower	April 22, 2019 (#100003633)	4420 Via Valmonte; 33°47′55″N 118°21′19″W	Palos Verdes Estates	
110	Montebello Woman's Club	Montebello Woman's Club	March 31, 1995 (#95000266)	201 S. Park Ave. 34°00′35″N 118°06′17″W	Montebello	
111	Mount Lowe Railway	Mount Lowe Railway	January 6, 1993 (#92001522)	North of Altadena in Angeles NF; 34°12′40″N 118°07′14″W	Altadena	
112	National Bank of Whittier Building	National Bank of Whittier Building	December 30, 1982 (#82000969)	13002 E. Philadelphia St. 33°58′44″N 118°02′10″W	Whittier	
113	National Chicano Moratorium March August 29, 1970		November 16, 2020 (#100002657)	East 3rd St., Beverly Blvd., Atlantic Ave., Whittier Blvd., and Salazar Park; 34°01′26″N 118°11′27″W	East Los Angeles	
114	North Harper Avenue Historic District	North Harper Avenue Historic District	June 28, 1996 (#96000694)	Roughly N. Harper Ave. between Fountain and De Longpre Aves. 34°05′42″N 118°22′04″W	West Hollywood	
115	Oaklawn Bridge and Waiting Station	Oaklawn Bridge and Waiting Station	July 16, 1973 (#73000406)	Between Oaklawn and Fair Oaks Aves. 34°07′08″N 118°09′08″W	South Pasadena	
116	The Oaks	The Oaks	April 6, 1978 (#78000692)	250 N. Primrose Ave. 34°09′22″N 118°00′07″W	Monrovia	
117	Pacific Electric Railroad Bridge	Pacific Electric Railroad Bridge	July 13, 1989 (#89000854)	Torrance Blvd. and Bow St. 33°50′15″N 118°18′39″W	Torrance	
118	Pacific Electric Railway Company Substation No. 8	Pacific Electric Railway Company Substation No. 8	November 9, 1977 (#77000295)	2245 N. Lake Ave. 34°11′04″N 118°07′55″W	Altadena	
119	Paddison Ranch Buildings	Paddison Ranch Buildings	June 23, 1978 (#78000694)	11951 Imperial Hwy. 33°55′05″N 118°04′35″W	Norwalk	
120	Padua Hills Theatre	Padua Hills Theatre	January 23, 1998 (#97001660)	4467 Via Padova; 34°09′04″N 117°42′03″W	Claremont	Long-running theater that ran work featuring Mexican-American themes
121	Ygnacio Palomares Adobe	Ygnacio Palomares Adobe	March 24, 1971 (#71000156)	Corner of Arrow Hwy. and Orange Grove Ave. 34°05′30″N 117°44′30″W	Pomona	
122	Palos Verdes Public Library and Art Gallery	Palos Verdes Public Library and Art Gallery	April 7, 1995 (#95000388)	2400 Via Campesina; 33°47′58″N 118°23′13″W	Palos Verdes Estates	
123	Pan American National Bank of East Los Angeles	Pan American National Bank of East Los Angeles	March 27, 2017 (#100000782)	3620-3626 E. 1st St. 34°02′10″N 118°11′18″W	East Los Angeles	
124	Parkhurst Building	Parkhurst Building	November 17, 1978 (#78000699)	185 Pier Ave. 33°59′55″N 118°28′45″W	Santa Monica	
125	Patio del Moro	Patio del Moro	September 11, 1986 (#86002418)	8225-8237 Fountain Ave. 34°05′41″N 118°22′03″W	West Hollywood	
126	John Carlton Pegler House	John Carlton Pegler House	October 20, 1988 (#88002019)	419 E. Highland Ave. 34°09′56″N 118°02′44″W	Sierra Madre	
127	Phillips Mansion	Phillips Mansion	November 6, 1974 (#74000525)	2640 W. Pomona Blvd. 34°03′22″N 117°47′44″W	Pomona	
128	Pio Pico Casa	Pio Pico Casa	June 19, 1973 (#73000408)	6003 Pioneer Blvd. 33°59′37″N 118°04′51″W	Whittier	
129	Pioneer Oil Refinery	Pioneer Oil Refinery	December 11, 2020 (#100005942)	0.35 mi. southwest of jct. of Pine St. and Newhall Ave. 34°22′27″N 118°31′24″W	Santa Clarita	
130	Pitzer House	Pitzer House	September 4, 1986 (#86002192)	4353 N. Towne; 34°07′17″N 117°44′10″W	Claremont	Bungalow house
131	Point Vicente Light	Point Vicente Light	October 31, 1980 (#80000808)	Rancho Palos Verdes; 33°44′31″N 118°24′31″W	Rancho Palos Verdes	
132	Pomona City Stables	Pomona City Stables	October 6, 2004 (#04001109)	636 W. Monterey Ave. 34°03′33″N 117°45′31″W	Pomona	
133	Pomona Fox Theater	Pomona Fox Theater	February 19, 1982 (#82002201)	102-144 3rd St. 34°03′24″N 117°44′59″W	Pomona	
134	Pomona YMCA Building	Pomona YMCA Building	March 6, 1986 (#86000408)	350 N. Garey Ave. 34°03′36″N 117°44′56″W	Pomona	
135	Puvunga Indian Village Sites	Puvunga Indian Village Sites	January 21, 1974 (#74000521)	Address restricted	Long Beach	
136	Queen Anne Cottage and Coach Barn	Queen Anne Cottage and Coach Barn	October 31, 1980 (#80000804)	301 N. Baldwin Ave. 34°08′27″N 118°03′09″W	Arcadia	Located in the Los Angeles County Arboretum and Botanic Garden
137	Rancho Los Alamitos	Rancho Los Alamitos	July 7, 1981 (#81000153)	6400 Bixby Hill Rd. 33°46′38″N 118°06′19″W	Long Beach	
138	Redondo Beach Original Townsite Historic District	Redondo Beach Original Townsite Historic District	June 30, 1988 (#88000970)	N. Gertruda Ave., Carnelian St., N. Guadalupe Ave. and Diamond St. 33°50′48″N 118°23′08″W	Redondo Beach	
139	Redondo Beach Public Library	Redondo Beach Public Library	March 12, 1981 (#81000158)	309 Esplanade St. 33°50′16″N 118°23′20″W	Redondo Beach	
140	Jennie A. Reeve House	Jennie A. Reeve House	June 21, 1984 (#84000883)	4260 Country Club Dr. 33°50′03″N 118°11′41″W	Long Beach	
141	Helen Goodwin Renwick House	Helen Goodwin Renwick House	June 7, 2016 (#16000322)	146 N. College Ave. 34°05′44″N 117°42′53″W	Claremont	Queen Anne home of philanthropist Helen Goodwin Renwick, currently owned by Pomona College
142	Rialto Theatre	Rialto Theatre	May 24, 1978 (#78000700)	1019-1023 Fair Oaks Ave. 34°06′50″N 118°08′59″W	South Pasadena	
143	Ridge Route	Ridge Route	September 25, 1997 (#97001113)	Along Old Ridge Rte., roughly bounded by Sandberg and Canton Canyon; 34°37′56″N 118°41′49″W	Castaic	Extends into Kern County
144	James C. Rives House	James C. Rives House	May 22, 1978 (#78000681)	10921 S. Paramount Blvd. 33°56′42″N 118°08′10″W	Downey	Actual address is 10933.
145	RMS Queen Mary	RMS Queen Mary	April 15, 1993 (#92001714)	Pier J, 1126 Queensway Hwy. 33°45′10″N 118°11′23″W	Long Beach	
146	Virginia Robinson Estate	Virginia Robinson Estate	November 15, 1978 (#78000679)	1008 Elden Way; 34°05′11″N 118°25′00″W	Beverly Hills	public gardens & house museum
147	Rockhaven Sanitarium Historic District	Rockhaven Sanitarium Historic District	June 9, 2016 (#16000355)	2713 Honolulu Ave. bounded by Pleasure Way, Hermosa & Honolulu Aves. 34°12′41″N 118°14′19″W	Glendale	
148	Ronda	Ronda	February 28, 1985 (#85000356)	1400-1414 Havenhurst Dr. 34°05′48″N 118°21′59″W	West Hollywood	
149	John A. Rowland House	John A. Rowland House	July 16, 1973 (#73000403)	16021 E. Gale Ave. 34°00′39″N 117°57′24″W	Industry	House built by pioneer John A. Rowland in 1855
150	Rubel Castle Historic District	Rubel Castle Historic District	October 7, 2013 (#13000810)	844 N. Live Oak Ave. 34°09′01″N 117°51′17″W	Glendora	
151	Russian Village District	Russian Village District	December 28, 1978 (#78000680)	290-370 S. Mills Ave. and 480 Cucamonga Ave. 34°05′25″N 117°42′25″W	Claremont	15 folk architecture style houses built by Konstanty ("Steve") Stys, a Polish immigrant, and others during the Great Depression
152	Saddle Rock Ranch Pictograph Site	Saddle Rock Ranch Pictograph Site	February 12, 1982 (#82004617)	Address restricted	Malibu	
153	San Dimas Hotel	San Dimas Hotel	March 16, 1972 (#72000233)	121 San Dimas Ave. 34°06′27″N 117°48′23″W	San Dimas	
154	San Gabriel Mission	San Gabriel Mission	May 6, 1971 (#71000158)	Junipero St. and W. Mission Dr. 34°05′52″N 118°06′22″W	San Gabriel	
155	San Gabriel Mission Playhouse	San Gabriel Mission Playhouse	July 22, 2019 (#100002674)	320 S. Mission Dr. 34°05′53″N 118°06′32″W	San Gabriel	
156	San Rafael Rancho	San Rafael Rancho	December 12, 1976 (#76000487)	Bonita Dr. 34°10′49″N 118°13′55″W	Glendale	
157	Santa Monica Civic Auditorium	Santa Monica Civic Auditorium	October 16, 2024 (#100010919)	1855 Main Street; 34°00′32″N 118°29′21″W	Santa Monica	
158	Santa Monica Looff Hippodrome	Santa Monica Looff Hippodrome	February 27, 1987 (#87000766)	276 Santa Monica Pier; 34°00′36″N 118°29′43″W	Santa Monica	
159	J.W. Schaffer House	J.W. Schaffer House	April 19, 2016 (#16000174)	527 Whiting Woods Rd. 34°12′54″N 118°14′58″W	Glendale	
160	R. M. Schindler House	R. M. Schindler House	July 14, 1971 (#71000150)	833 N. Kings Rd. 34°05′11″N 118°22′16″W	West Hollywood	
161	Scripps College for Women	Scripps College for Women	September 20, 1984 (#84000887)	Columbia and 10th St. 34°06′18″N 117°42′30″W	Claremont	Historic core of the private liberal arts women's college designed by Gordon Kaufmann in the Spanish Colonial Revival style
162	Scripps Hall	Scripps Hall	July 28, 1999 (#99000893)	209 E. Mariposa St. 34°11′34″N 118°08′38″W	Altadena	Destroyed in the January 2025 Southern California wildfires
163	Second Church of Christ Scientist	Second Church of Christ Scientist	April 1, 2005 (#05000212)	655 Cedar Ave. 33°44′55″N 118°11′35″W	Long Beach	
164	Security Trust and Savings Building	Security Trust and Savings Building	March 29, 2019 (#100003553)	110 Pine Ave. 33°46′06″N 118°11′33″W	Long Beach	
165	Upton Sinclair House	Upton Sinclair House	November 11, 1971 (#71000153)	464 N. Myrtle Ave. 34°09′44″N 118°00′00″W	Monrovia	
166	South Pasadena Historic District	South Pasadena Historic District	July 21, 1982 (#82002202)	Roughly bounded by Mission and El Centro Sts., and Fairview and Meridian Aves. 34°07′01″N 118°09′23″W	South Pasadena	
167	Southern Pacific Railroad Depot, Whittier	Southern Pacific Railroad Depot, Whittier	March 29, 2005 (#04001105)	7333 Greenleaf Ave. 33°58′28″N 118°02′15″W	Whittier	Depot was originally listed in 1978 at its original location and was removed from the Register on October 1, 2004. It was returned to the Register at its new location in 2005.
168	Sovereign Hotel	Sovereign Hotel	October 24, 1997 (#97001236)	205 Washington Ave. 34°01′13″N 118°30′07″W	Santa Monica	
169	Standard Oil Building	Standard Oil Building	June 9, 1980 (#80000816)	7257 Bright Ave. 33°58′33″N 118°02′08″W	Whittier	
170	Stevens House		October 9, 2009 (#09000802)	23524 Malibu Colony Rd. 34°01′55″N 118°41′14″W	Malibu	
171	Charles E. Straight House	Charles E. Straight House	July 8, 1992 (#92000833)	4333 Emerald Ave. 34°07′03″N 117°46′04″W	La Verne	
172	Sunset Tower	Sunset Tower	May 30, 1980 (#80000812)	8358 Sunset Blvd. 34°05′42″N 118°22′17″W	West Hollywood	
173	Sweetser Residence	Sweetser Residence	September 5, 1985 (#85001984)	417 E. Beryl St. 33°50′57″N 118°23′16″W	Redondo Beach	
174	The Tank Site-(CA-LAN-1)		December 17, 2015 (#15000912)	Address restricted	Topanga Canyon	
175	Temple Mansion	Temple Mansion	December 2, 1974 (#74000518)	15415 E. Don Julian Rd. 34°01′12″N 117°57′53″W	Industry	
176	Franklin Rosborough "Frank" Thomas House	Franklin Rosborough "Frank" Thomas House	February 3, 2015 (#14001233)	758 Flintridge Ave. 34°11′15″N 118°11′35″W	La Canada Flintridge	Home built in 1949 for Disney animator Frank Thomas
177	Torrance School	Torrance School	October 13, 1983 (#83003542)	2200 W. Carson; 33°49′41″N 118°19′06″W	Torrance	
178	Joseph and Carrie Torrey House	Joseph and Carrie Torrey House	April 23, 2018 (#100002319)	711 Daisy Ave. 33°46′32″N 118°11′59″W	Long Beach	
179	Tuna Club of Avalon	Tuna Club of Avalon	April 2, 1991 (#91000338)	100 St. Catherine Way, Catalina Island; 33°20′44″N 118°19′35″W	Avalon	
180	US Post Office–Beverly Hills Main	US Post Office–Beverly Hills Main	January 11, 1985 (#85000126)	469 N. Crescent Dr. 34°04′19″N 118°24′08″W	Beverly Hills	
181	US Post Office–Burbank Downtown Station	US Post Office–Burbank Downtown Station	January 11, 1985 (#85000127)	125 E. Olive Ave. 34°10′48″N 118°18′34″W	Burbank	
182	US Post Office–Glendale Main	US Post Office–Glendale Main	January 11, 1985 (#85000128)	313 E. Broadway St. 34°08′54″N 118°15′07″W	Glendale	
183	US Post Office–Long Beach Main	US Post Office–Long Beach Main	January 11, 1985 (#85000129)	300 Long Beach Blvd. 33°46′22″N 118°11′20″W	Long Beach	
184	Walter D. Valentine Cottage B	Walter D. Valentine Cottage B	July 24, 2017 (#100001337)	1419 E. Palm St. 34°11′39″N 118°07′16″W	Altadena	Destroyed in the January 2025 Southern California wildfires.
185	Vasquez Rocks	Vasquez Rocks	June 22, 1972 (#72000228)	Agua Dulce Rd. 34°29′07″N 118°19′28″W	Agua Dulce	
186	Villa Carlotta	Villa Carlotta	June 17, 2014 (#14000303)	234 E. Mendocino St. 34°11′22″N 118°08′40″W	Altadena	
187	Villa Francesca		October 2, 1986 (#86002796)	1 Peppertree Dr. 33°44′26″N 118°22′09″W	Rancho Palos Verdes	
188	Villa Riviera	Villa Riviera	July 25, 1996 (#96000778)	800 E. Ocean Blvd. 33°45′59″N 118°10′54″W	Long Beach	
189	Washington Building	Washington Building	May 28, 1991 (#91000635)	9720-9732 Washington Blvd. 34°01′19″N 118°23′44″W	Culver City	
190	Wayfarers Chapel	Wayfarers Chapel	July 11, 2005 (#05000210)	5755 Palos Verdes Dr. S 33°44′41″N 118°22′33″W	Rancho Palos Verdes	Designed by Lloyd Wright; designated a National Historic Landmark in 2023.
191	Henry Weaver House	Henry Weaver House	December 27, 1989 (#89002114)	142 Adelaide Dr. 34°01′40″N 118°30′47″W	Santa Monica	
192	Well No. 4, Pico Canyon Oil Field	Well No. 4, Pico Canyon Oil Field	November 13, 1966 (#66000212)	9.5 miles (15.3 km) north of San Fernando, west of US 99; 34°22′10″N 118°37′49″W	Mentryville	
193	Michael White Adobe	Michael White Adobe	September 30, 2014 (#14000797)	2701 Huntington Dr. 34°07′36″N 118°05′58″W	San Marino	
194	The Willmore	The Willmore	May 20, 1999 (#99000579)	315 W. Third St. 33°46′15″N 118°11′40″W	Long Beach	
195	Woman's Club of Redondo Beach	Woman's Club of Redondo Beach	April 19, 1984 (#84000900)	400 S. Broadway; 33°50′12″N 118°23′06″W	Redondo Beach	
196	Woodbury-Story House	Woodbury-Story House	December 30, 1993 (#93001463)	2606 N. Madison Ave. 34°11′21″N 118°08′00″W	Altadena	
197	Workman Adobe	Workman Adobe	November 20, 1974 (#74000519)	15415 E. Don Julian Rd. 34°01′12″N 117°57′51″W	Industry	
198	Workman Family Cemetery	Workman Family Cemetery	November 20, 1974 (#74000520)	15415 E. Don Julian Rd. 34°01′07″N 117°57′45″W	Industry	
199	Lloyd Wright Home and Studio	Lloyd Wright Home and Studio	April 6, 1987 (#87000562)	858 N. Doheny Dr. 34°05′12″N 118°23′37″W	West Hollywood	Lloyd Wright
200	William Wrigley Jr. Summer Cottage	William Wrigley Jr. Summer Cottage	August 15, 1985 (#85001785)	76 Wrigley Rd. 33°20′28″N 118°19′13″W	Avalon	
201	Wynyate	Wynyate	April 24, 1973 (#73000407)	851 Lyndon St. 34°06′39″N 118°09′28″W	South Pasadena	
202	Zumbrota (yacht)	Zumbrota (yacht)	March 20, 2017 (#100000762)	13755 Fiji Way; 33°58′21″N 118°26′47″W	Marina Del Rey	

== Former listings ==
	Name on the Register	Image	Date listed	Date removed	Location	City or town	Description
1	James George Bell House		April 18, 1977 (#77000296)	November 2, 1989	6500 Lucille Ave.	Bell	Delisted when it was relocated across the street next to City Hall. Still standing.
2	Walter Luther Dodge House	Walter Luther Dodge House	November 22, 1968 (#68000058)	1970	950 N. King Rd.	West Hollywood	Demolished, February 9, 1970.
3	Hughes Flying Boat (Hercules)	Hughes Flying Boat (Hercules)	1980 (#80004493)	October 13, 1992	Berth 121, Pier E, Port of Long Beach	Long Beach	Moved to Oregon in 1991 and relisted in Yamhill County in 2024
4	Little Rock Creek Dam	Little Rock Creek Dam	April 15, 1977 (#77000301)	June 17, 1994	5 miles from Palmdale, California CA 138	Palmdale	Design and upgrade changes in 1994
5	Pacific Coast Club		November 20, 1980 (#80000807)	April 4, 1989	850 E. Ocean Blvd.	Long Beach	Built in 1926 and taken down in 1989

== See also ==
- Bibliography of California history
- Bibliography of Los Angeles
- Outline of the history of Los Angeles
- List of National Historic Landmarks in California
- National Register of Historic Places listings in California
- California Historical Landmarks in Los Angeles County, California
