= Russian Village =

Russian Village may refer to:

in Russia

- For general information about villages in Russia, see types of inhabited localities in Russia

in the United States

- Russian Village Historic District, listed on the National Register of Historic Places in Connecticut
- Russian Village District, listed on the National Register of Historic Places in California
