= Howard Longley House =

Historic house in California, United States

- U.S. National Register of Historic Places
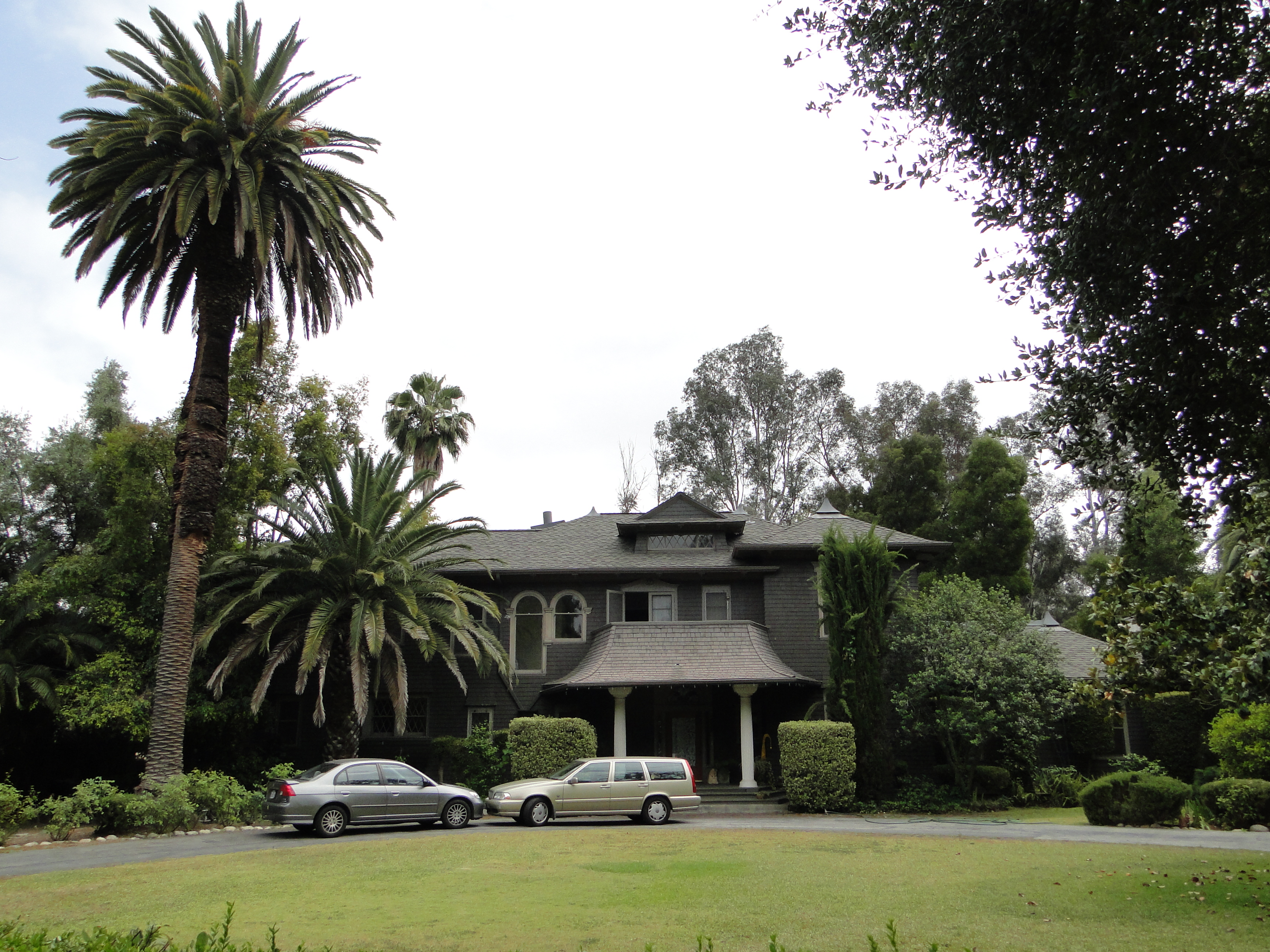
- The Howard Longley House in 2011

- Location within California Location within the United States
- Location: 1005 Buena Vista Street, South Pasadena, California
- Coordinates: 34°7′14″N 118°9′19″W
- Area: 0.5 acres (0.20 ha)
- Built: 1897
- Architect: Greene & Greene
- NRHP reference No.: 74000527
- Added to NRHP: April 16, 1974

The Howard Longley House is a historic house in South Pasadena, California, U.S. In 1897, Greene and Greene recorded job no. 23 as a residence for Howard and Etta Longley at 1005 Buena Vista Street, with a valuation of $3,876. Mr. Longley was "the brother-in-law of Dr. Greene's [i.e., Charles and Henry Greene's father] sister, Alice." The house is significant as one of the earliest surviving residences designed by Greene & Greene. On 6 August 1897, the Los Angeles Journal reported that plans for the house were being prepared. The Longley house stands next to the Lucretia Garfield House (designed by Greene & Greene in 1904 for the widow of President James Garfield). The Longley House was listed on the National Register of Historic Places on April 16, 1974.
