= Palos Verdes Public Library and Art Gallery =

- U.S. National Register of Historic Places
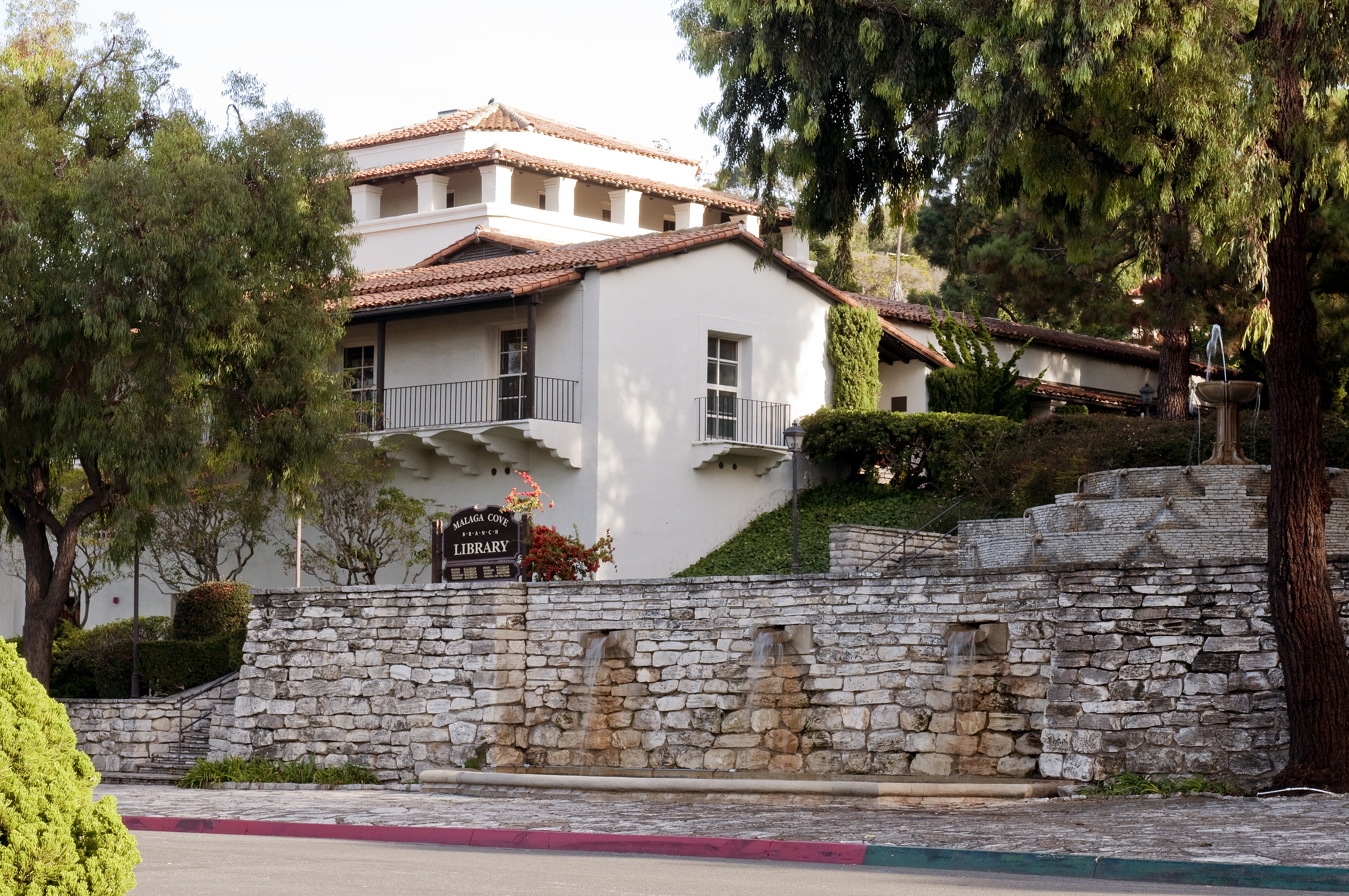
- The library in 2010

- Location within California
- Location: 2400 Via Campesina, Palos Verdes Estates, California
- Coordinates: 33°47′58″N 118°23′13″W
- Area: less than one acre
- Built: 1930
- Architect: Myron Hunt; Harold C. Chambers
- Architectural style: Mediterranean Revival architecture
- NRHP reference No.: 95000388
- Added to NRHP: April 7, 1995

The Palos Verdes Public Library and Art Gallery is a historic building in Palos Verdes Estates, California. It was built in 1929–1930 and designed in the Mediterranean Revival style by architects Myron Hunt and Harold C. Chambers. It has been listed on the National Register of Historic Places since April 7, 1995.
