= Redondo Beach Original Townsite Historic District =

City in California, United States

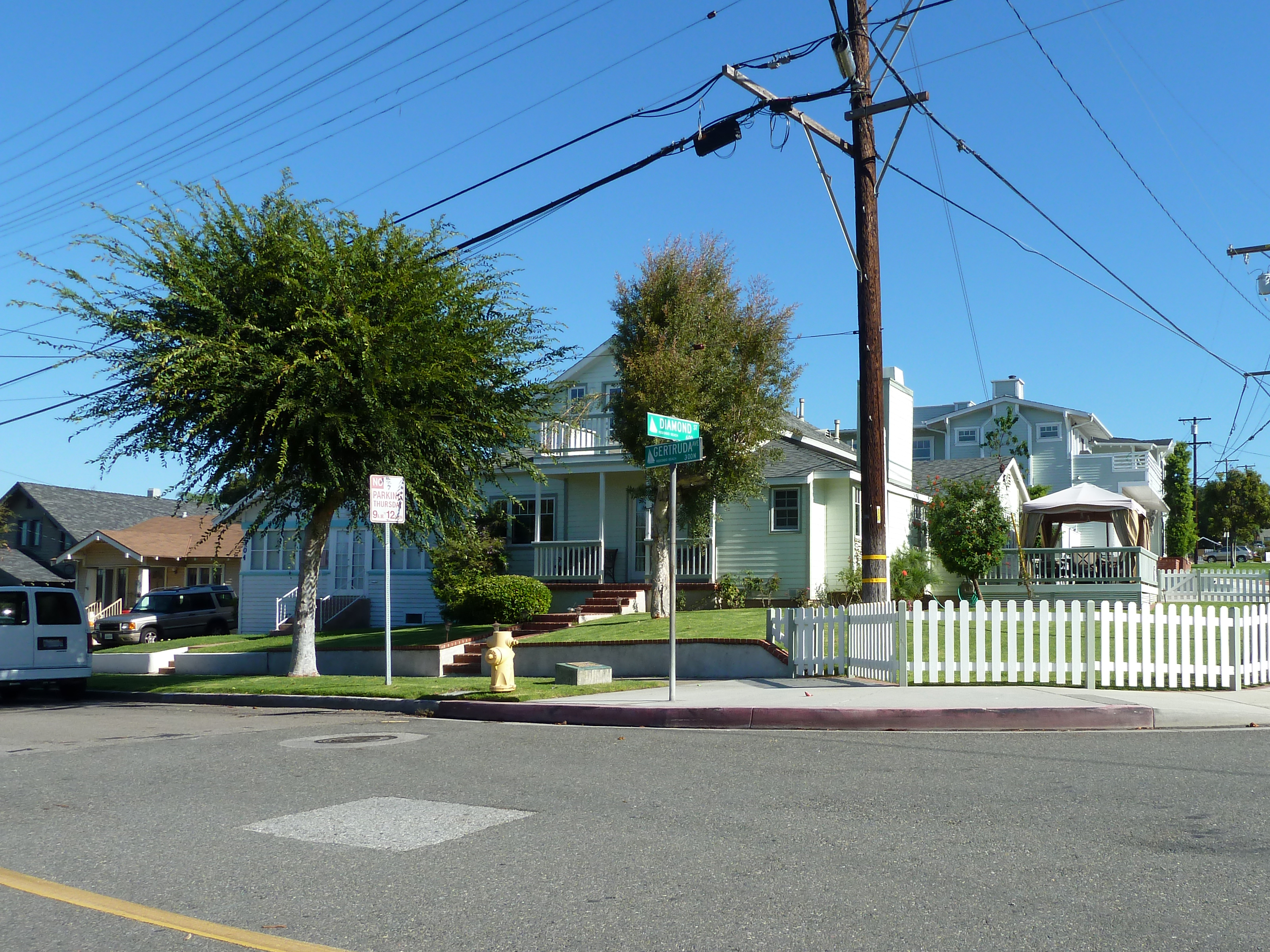
Redondo Beach Original Townsite Historic District

The Redondo Beach Original Townsite Historic District is a 3.36-acre (1.36 ha) area that was listed on the National Register of Historic Places listings in Los Angeles County, California on June 30, 1988.

== Area ==
Although seemingly small in area, the entire present-day area of Redondo Beach was recorded in 2019 by the United States Census Bureau to encompass only 6.20 sq mi (16.06 km2) of land and 0.01 sq mi (0.03 km2) of water.

== Location ==
It is approximately five blocks from what was once considered to be downtown Redondo Beach: 300 block North Gertruda Ave., 505-507-509-511 North Guadalupe Avenue, 512-610-612-614 Carnelian Street and 625 Diamond Street.
