= Azusa Civic Center =

Center of city government in Azusa, California

- U.S. National Register of Historic Places
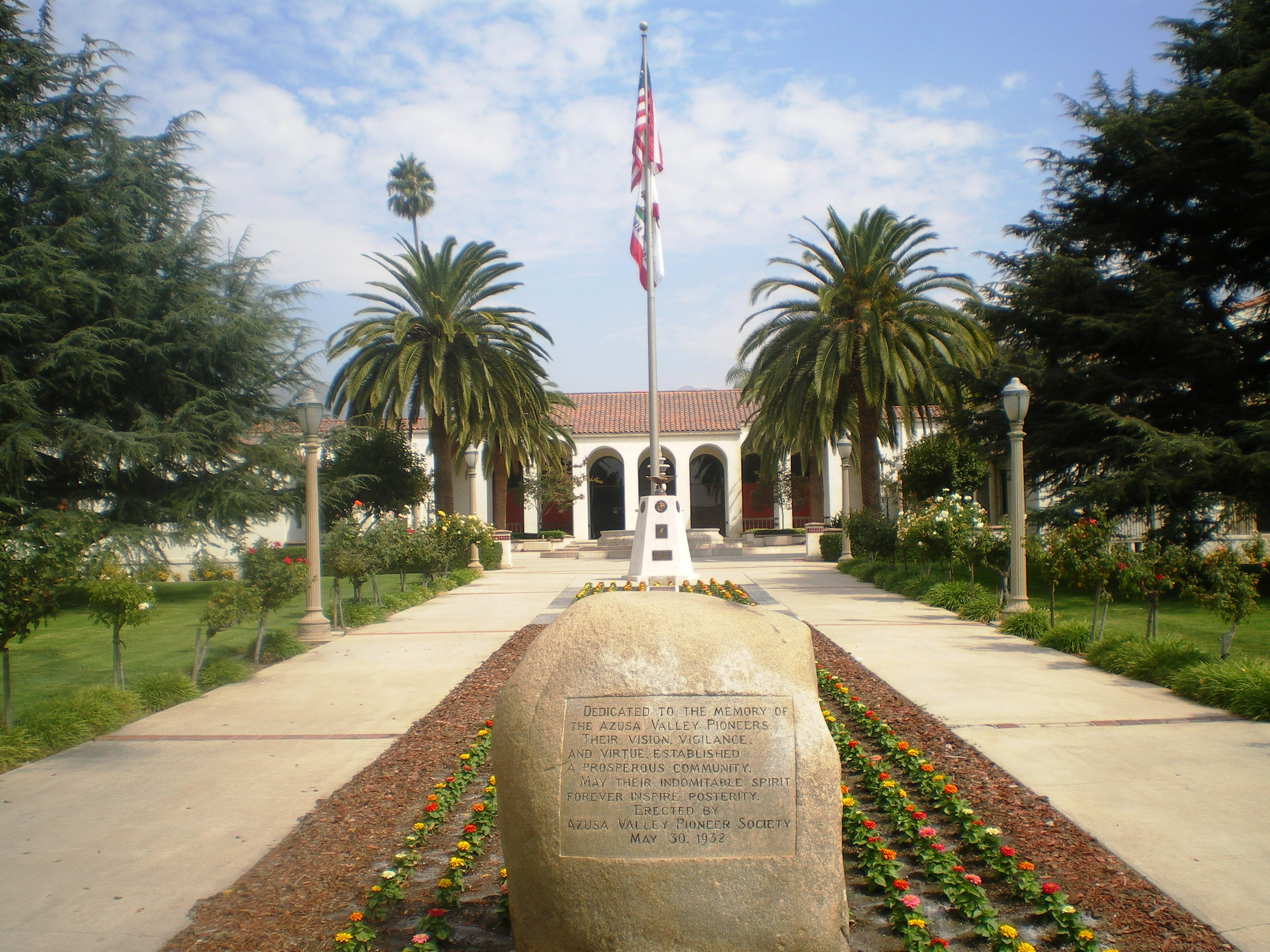
- Azusa Civic Center, August 2008

- Location within the Los Angeles metropolitan area Location within California Location within the United States
- Location: 213 East Foothill Blvd., Azusa, California 91702, US
- Coordinates: 34°8′3″N 117°54′18″W
- Architect: Richard M. Bates, Jr.
- Architectural style: Mission/Spanish Revival
- NRHP reference No.: 02000034
- Added to NRHP: February 21, 2002

The Azusa Civic Center is the center of city government in Azusa, California, a city located to the northeast of Los Angeles. The Mission/Spanish Revival buildings were added to the National Register of Historic Places in 2002.

== Construction and history ==
The City of Azusa started work on its civic center in 1904 when the city's public library was moved to the area that is now the civic center. In 1928, the City completed construction of the two main wings of the civic center, with City Hall on one side and the municipal auditorium on the other. In 1929, a nine-foot by fifteen-foot miniature of the new Azusa Civic Center, made largely out of plaster-of-paris, was displayed as Azusa's exhibit at the Los Angeles County Fair. The Civic Center was completed in 1945 with the completion of the fire department's headquarters. At the time of the center's completion, the Los Angeles Times reported that the addition of the Fire Department to "Azusa's carefully designed Civic Center" added another section to the double-winged, one-story building that then housed the City Hall, Mayor's office, Chamber of Commerce, Public Library, Police Department, Water and Light Department, City Clerk, Treasurer, engineer and building inspector. All of the structures in the Civic Center were designed with a common Mission/Spanish Revival style of architecture. Since 1949, the Civic Center has been the location for musical events, a carnival, a parade, and other events associated with Azusa's annual "Golden Days" celebration conducted each fall.

== Celebration of a running gag: "Anaheim, Azusa and Cucamonga" ==
A popular running gag on the long-running radio comedy The Jack Benny Program involved a train caller, voiced by Mel Blanc, calling out, "Train leaving on Track Five for Anaheim, Azusa and Cucamonga." The gag, which also continued on Jack Benny's television program, brought national attention to the three cities. In 1966, a widely publicized ceremony was held at the Azusa Civic Center, celebrating "Jack Benny Day." The celebration included a parade around Azusa's city hall with marching bands, drum majorettes and Benny seated on the tailgate of a small red wagon pulled by four Liliputian horses. Benny was given gold keys to the cities on Hawaiian leis presented by the queens of the three cities. Benny explained the origin of the gag as follows:

About 25 years ago on radio, we were looking for the names of three suburban cities that would rhyme for a railroad scene featuring Mel Blanc. We didn't look for sustaining gags, you can't create them artificially. We used it once, twice, three times. Each time the audience laughed louder. We were not about to give up a good thing.

The gag was so popular that, when Benny died in 1974, the headline in the Los Angeles Times read: "Last Call for Anaheim, Azusa and Cucamonga ..."

== Historic designation ==
The Azusa Civic Center was added to the National Register of Historic Places on February 21, 2002. It is the only site in Azusa to be listed on the National Register.

== See also ==
- List of Registered Historic Places in Los Angeles County, California
