= Malibu Historic District =

- U.S. National Register of Historic Places
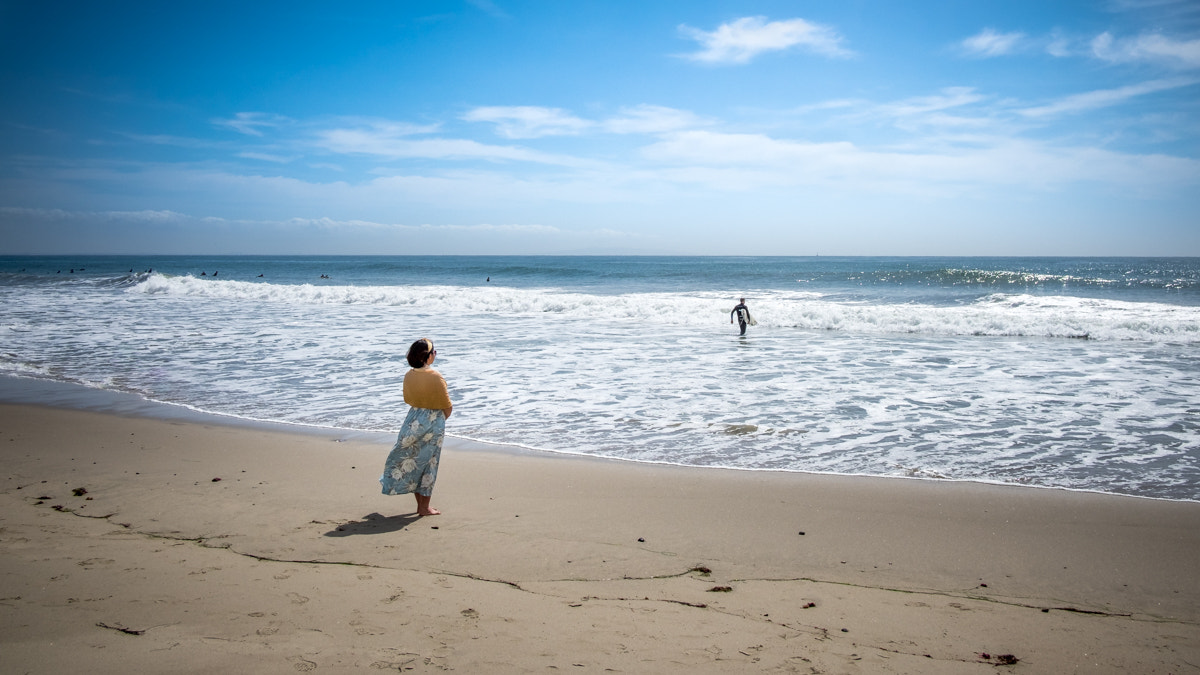
- Malibu Beach

- Location within the Los Angeles metropolitan area Location within California Location within the United States
- Location: Roughly bounded by Pacific Ocean, Ocean Front Walk from Vicente Terracce to Crescent Bay Park, Bicknell Ave. extending into ocean
- Coordinates: 34°02′13″N 118°40′35″W
- Area: 160 acres (65 ha)
- NRHP reference No.: 100002022
- Added to NRHP: January 29, 2018

The Malibu Historic District is a 160-acre (65 ha) area that was listed on the National Register of Historic Places listings in Los Angeles County, California on January 29, 2018. The approximate area of the district is along the Pacific Coast Highway from east of the Malibu Pier to the Malibu Colony privacy fence. Malibu was ground zero for California's surf culture, and was designated the first World Surfing Reserve by the Save the Waves Coalition in 2010. For its role in the cultural popularity of the surfing sport, and its subsequent technological influence on the surfboard evolution and efficiency, the period of the NRHP designation significance is 1945–1959.

== Surfing culture ==
Not only has the area been relevant to the sport of surfing in general, but it has also been instrumental to the surfboard manufacture evolution. During this era, surfer Bob Simmons was a regular on the Malibu scene, and pioneered the use of fiberglass and polyester resin to create a lightweight, durable surfboard, having a definitive impact on the design, production, and performance of the sport. Joe Quigg and Matt Kivlin were Malibu surfer contemporaries of Simmons who also contributed to the surfboard's evolution. Quigg created a new style of surfboard for Darrilyn Zanuck, the daughter of director Darryl F. Zanuck – lighter, shorter, easier to handle – based on designs he'd been using since the late-1940s. Matt Kivlin followed suit and designed a similar board, and together they began producing the “Malibu Chip” boards, which became the preferred model for their ease of use. Simmons, Quigg and Kivlin inspired a new generation of surfboards built for easy maneuverability.

According to Quigg, Darrilyn Zanuck was historically the first girl in what became young girls of the surfing culture, "She was at Malibu, really the first girl to buy a surfboard and buy a convertible and stick the surfboard in the back and drive up to Malibu and drive up and down the coast and learn to surf. Of the Malibu girls she was the first Malibu girl to really do it.” Inspired by later real-life teenage surfer Kathy Kohner, the Gidget culture of the teenage surfer at Malibu impacted youth culture with the novels, films and the Gidget Television series.

== Historic designation ==
The National Register of Historic Places listing nomination was submitted in 2015 by Michael Blum of the non-profit "Sea of Clouds" based in Hermosa Beach, California. The Malibu City Council gave its unanimous support, and more than 550 endorsements approved the effort.

In 2021, the United States Department of Agriculture substantiated this specific NRHP designation as a model first step towards historic preservation working in tandem with coastal zone management. As such, the USDA denotes four rationales "(1) is explicitly site-specific, (2) aims to not just consider historic significance but secure specific legal protections and provisions because of it, (3) places surfing within the set of claims regarding historical, cultural, and economic significance, and (4) secures protections based directly on significance."

== See also ==
- List of Registered Historic Places in Los Angeles County, California

== Bibliography ==
- Blum, Michael (March 6, 2017). "NRHP Application for Malibu Historic district" (PDF). Los Angeles County.
