= Katherine Emery Estate =

Historic house in California, United States

- U.S. National Register of Historic Places
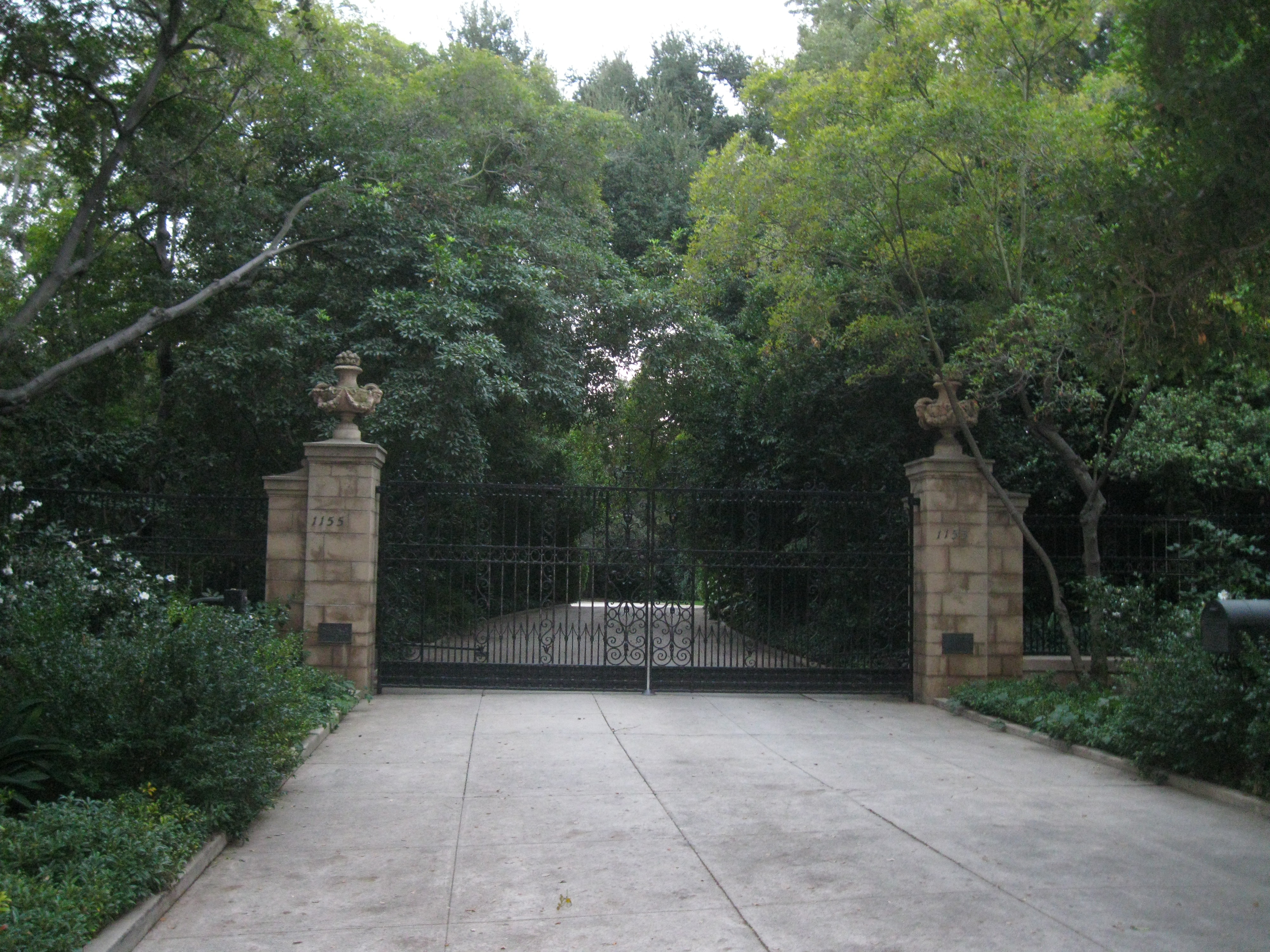
- The front gate of the estate

- Location within California
- Location: 1155 Oak Grove Ave, San Marino, California
- Coordinates: 34°07′31″N 118°07′38″W
- Built: 1928
- Architect: Myron Hunt, et al
- Architectural style: Tudor Revival
- NRHP reference No.: 10001118
- Added to NRHP: January 10, 2011

The Katherine Emery Estate is a historic house located at 1155 Oak Grove Avenue in San Marino, California. It is named for prominent California resident Katherine Sinclair Emery, who commissioned its construction, and has no connection to 1940s Hollywood character actress Katherine Emery.

Prominent Southern California architect Myron Hunt designed the Tudor Revival house, which was completed in 1928. The house's design includes multiple gable ends and dormers adorned with carved bargeboards and half-timbering. Other characteristic Tudor Revival elements include the stucco walls, groups of casement windows, and steep roof. The interior of the house features a Tudor great hall with a staircase, tracery windows, and oak woodwork.

Landscape architects Florence Yoch & Lucile Council worked with Hunt, designing the gardens surrounding the house. Major features of their work include terraces with stone balustrades.

The house was added to the National Register of Historic Places on January 10, 2011. The National Trust for Historic Preservation acquired the property in 2018 with the current owners retaining life tenancy.

As of 2025, it still remains a private residence.

== See also ==
- National Register of Historic Places listings in Los Angeles County, California
- San Marino, California-related articles
