= Pomona City Stables =

Historic stable building in Pomona, California, USA

- Pomona City Stable
- U.S. National Register of Historic Places
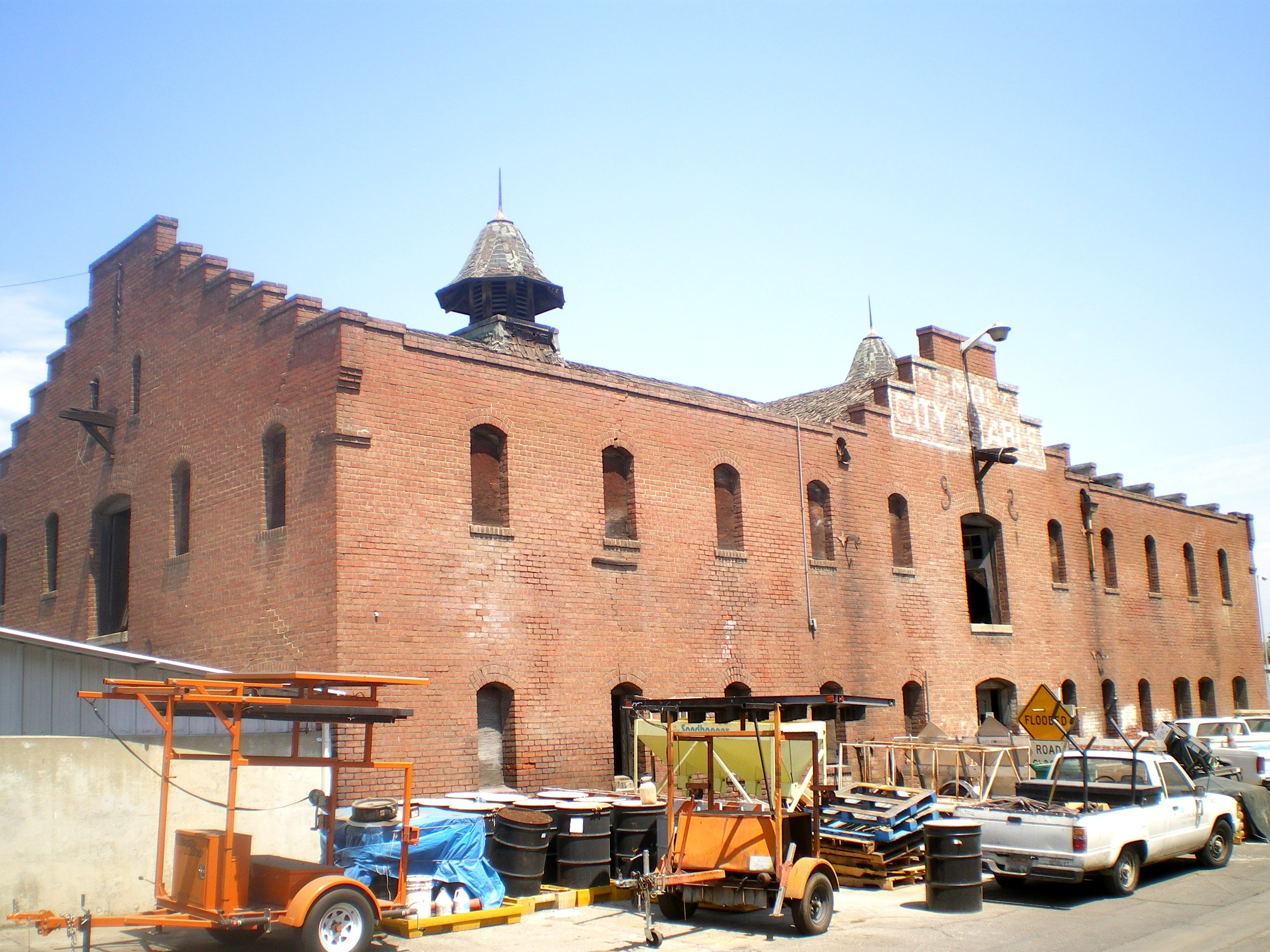
- Pomona City Stables, August 2008

- Location within the Los Angeles metropolitan area Location within California Location within the United States
- Location: 636 W. Monterey Ave., Pomona, California
- Coordinates: 34°3′33″N 117°45′31″W
- Built: 1909
- Architect: Ferdinand Davis
- Architectural style: Late Victorian
- NRHP reference No.: 04001109
- Added to NRHP: October 06, 2004

The Pomona City Stables, also known as the Pomona City Yards Brick Building, is a stables building completed in 1909 to house horses owned by the City of Pomona, California.

Built at a cost of $6,000, the Pomona City Stables building was designed by Pomona architect Ferdinand Davis from the firm of Davis and Higgs. Davis also designed several other prominent buildings in Pomona, including the Currier House (1907), the Masonic Lodge, the Ebell Club, and Trinity Methodist Church. Located on White Avenue, just north of the Southern Pacific railroad tracks, the Pomona City Stables opened in April 1909 and were described by the Los Angeles Times as "models of convenience" that would provide "ample room for the city stock and implements for some time to come." Upon its opening, the building was occupied by twenty-two head of horses owned by the city and a caretaker.

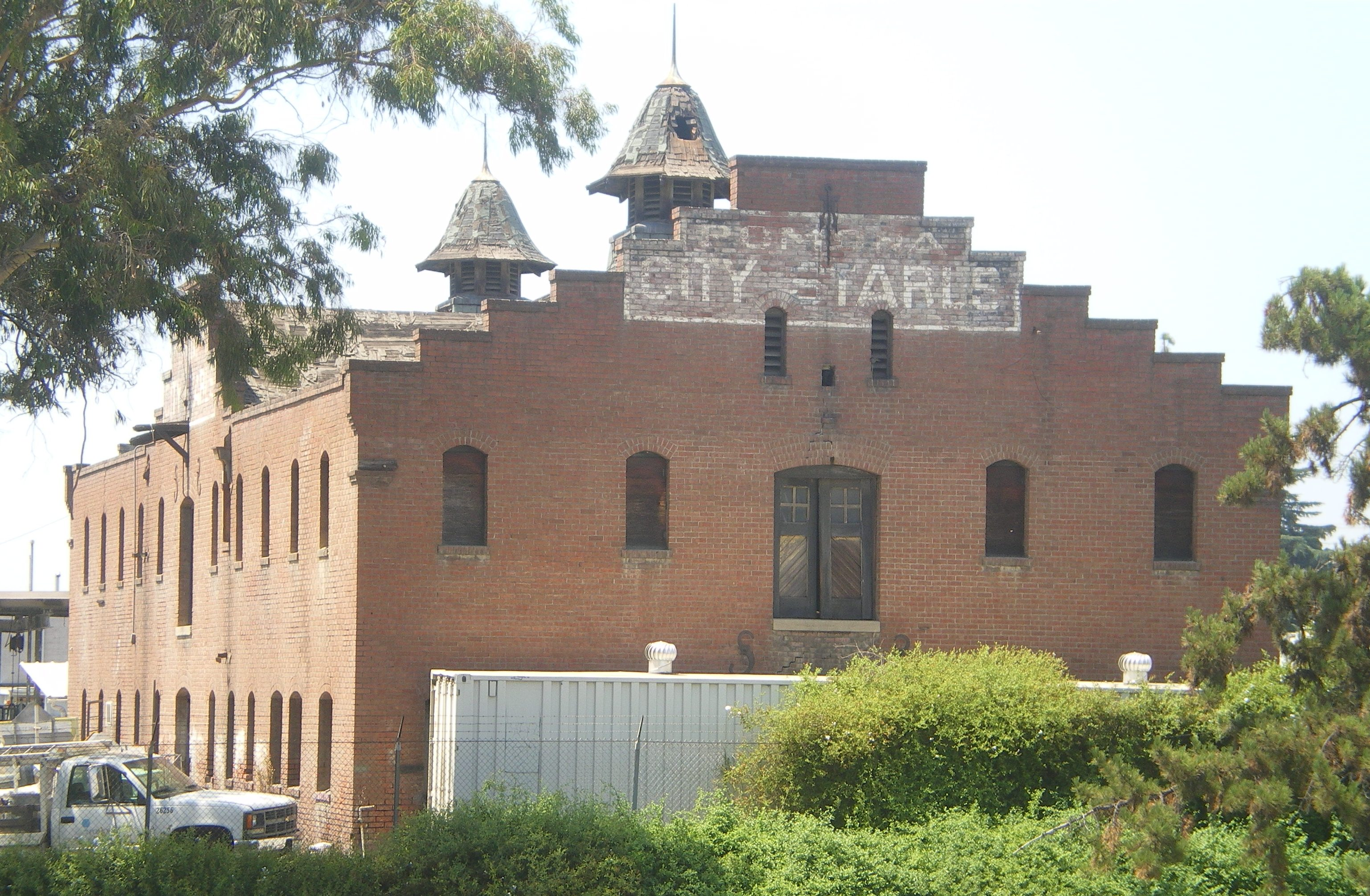

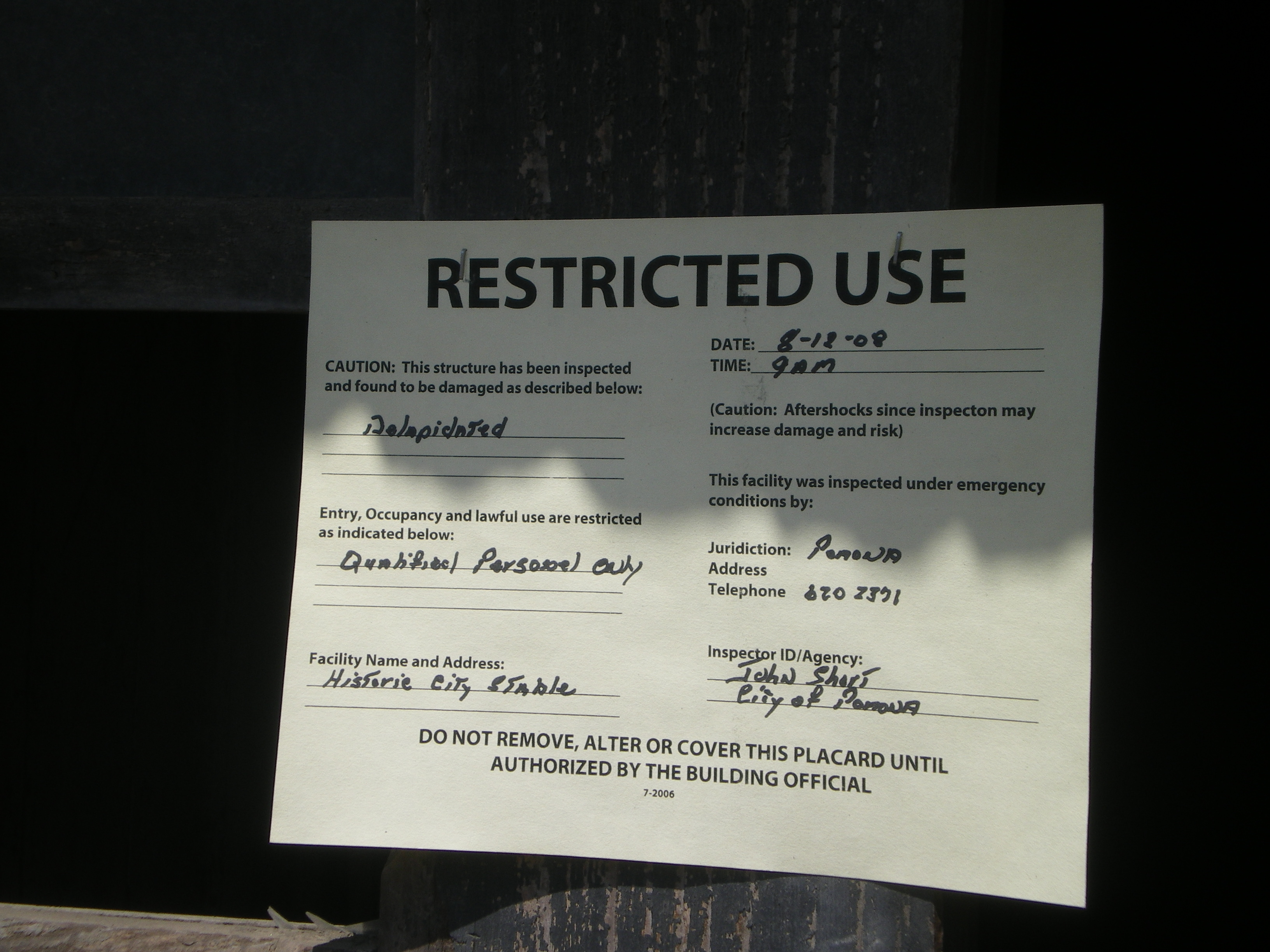
Notice posted on Pomona City Stables in August 2008 following Chino Hills earthquake.

The building is reported to be one of the oldest municipal buildings extant in California. In 2003, the Pomona Historic Preservation Commission recommended recognition of the stables building as a historic landmark, and the building was added to the National Register of Historic Places in October 2004. However, the listing of the building has not led to any cessation of the building's deterioration. Located in the middle of a fenced-off yard used by the City of Pomona for storage of municipal vehicles, fuel, and other materials, the building has fallen into a serious state of disrepair and dilapidation. After the July 2008 Chino Hills earthquake, city officials posted a sign (pictured at left) on the entrance to the stables restricting access due to its dilapidated condition. After severe winter rains, the stable walls partially collapsed in 2017. The stables were fully demolished by the city of Pomona in Fall of 2022.

== See also ==
- List of Registered Historic Places in Los Angeles County, California
