= Peter Gano House =

- U.S. National Register of Historic Places
- Location within California
- Location: 718 Crescent Avenue, Avalon, California
- Coordinates: 33°20′34″N 118°19′20″W
- Area: 0.2 acres (0.081 ha)
- Built: 1890
- Architectural style: Queen Anne
- NRHP reference No.: 83001194
- Added to NRHP: September 15, 1983

The Peter Gano House is a historic three-story house in Avalon, California. It was built in 1888-1890 by Peter Gano, a civil engineer, and designed in the Queen Anne style, with a cupola. It was purchased by Joshua Reed Giddings in 1921, followed by John Smith in 1961. It has been listed on the National Register of Historic Places since September 15, 1983. It remains a private house.
