= Jackson Gregory =

American journalist

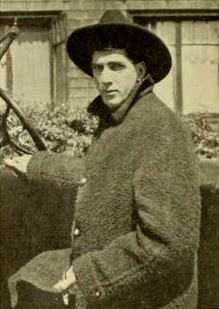
- Jackson Gregory in 1919
- Born: March 12, 1882; Salinas, California, US
- Died: June 12, 1943 (aged 61); Auburn, California, US
- Education: University of California, Berkeley (B.L.)
- Occupations: Writer, journalist
- Known for: Western, detective novels
- Spouse: Lotus McGlashan
- Children: 2

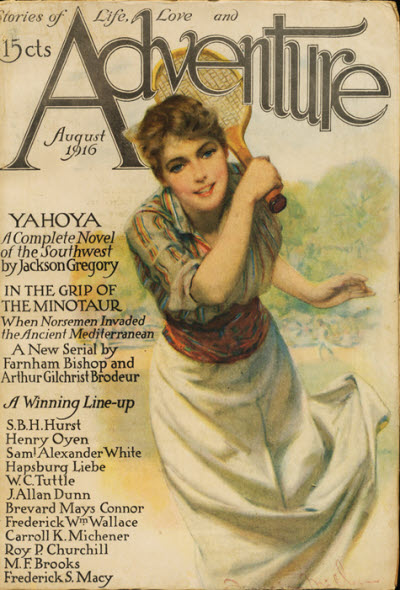
Gregory's "complete novel" Yahoya was cover-featured on the August 1916 issue of Adventure

Jackson Gregory (March 12, 1882 – June 12, 1943) was an American teacher, journalist, and writer.

== Biography ==
Jackson was born in Salinas, California, the son of Monterey county attorney Durrell Stokes Gregory (1825 – 1889) and Amelia (Hartnell), and was educated at the University of California, Berkeley, earning a B.L. in 1906. Jackson began his career as a newspaper reporter in San Francisco. He later served as a principal at a high school in Truckee, where he met his future wife, Lotus McGlashan. They were wed December 20, 1910, and the couple had two sons. Jackson then became a journalist, working in Illinois, Texas, and New York.

When their first son was born in 1912, the family settled in Auburn, California, where Jackson became a prolific writer of western and detective stories. Fifteen years later the couple moved to Pasadena, where they were divorced. Jackson then moved in with his brother Edward, who was living in Auburn. He died there June 12, 1943, while working on a novel titled The Hermit of Thunder King. Jackson Gregory authored more than 40 fiction novels and a number of short stories. Several of his tales were used as the basis of films released between 1916 and 1944, including The Man from Painted Post (1917).

== Bibliography ==
Jackson Gregory authored the following works:

- Under Handicap: a Novel (1914)
- The Outlaw (1916)
- The Short Cut (1916)
- Wolf Breed (1916)
- Six Feet Four (1918)
- The Joyous Trouble Maker (1918)
- Judith of Blue Lake Ranch (1919)
- The Bells of San Juan (1919)
- Ladyfingers (1920)
- Man to Man (1920)
- Desert Valley (1921)
- Daughter of the Sun: a Tale of Adventure (1921)
- The Everlasting Whisper: a Tale of the California Wilderness (1922)
- Timber-Wolf (1923)
- The Wilderness Trail (1923)
- The Maid of the Mountain: a Romance of the California Wilderness (1925)
- The Desert Thoroughbred: a Romance of the California Desert Country (1926)
- Captain Cavalier (1927)
- Emerald Trails (1928)
- Redwood And Gold (1928)
- Mystery at Spanish Hacienda (1929)
- Sentinel Of The Desert (1929)
- The Trail to Paradise (1930)
- The Island Of Allure (1931)
- The Silver Star (1931)
- Riders Across The Border (1932)
- A Case for Mr. Paul Savoy (1933)
- Red Rivals (1933)
- Ru, the Conqueror (1933)
- The Second Case Of Mr. Paul Savoy (1933)
- The Shadow On The Mesa (1933)
- High Courage (1934)
- The Third Case of Mr Paul Savoy (1934)
- The Island of Allure: a Romance of the High Seas (1934)
- Lords of the Coast (1935)
- Valley of Adventure (1935)
- Into The Sunset (1936)
- Mountain Men (1936)
- Dark Valley (c. 1937)
- Sudden Bill Dorn (1937)
- Marshal of Sundown (1938)
- Powder Smoke on Wandering River (1938)
- Mysterious rancho (1938)
- Mad O'Hara Of Wild River (1939)
- Rocky Bend (1939)
- Secret Valley (1939)
- The Far Call (1940)
- The Girl At The Crossroads (1940)
- I Must Ride Alone (1940)
- Ace In The Hole (1941)
- Guardians Of The Trail (1941)
- The Red Law (1941)
- Border Line (1942)
- The Man From Texas (1942)
- Two In The Wilderness (1942)
- Lonely Trail (1943)
- The Man From Painted Rock (1943)
- Aces Wild At Golden Eagle (1944)
- The Hermit Of Thunder King (1945)
- The Silver River (1950)
- The Lone Rider (1950)
- Hardcase Range (1958)

== See also ==
- Keyes Bungalow
