= Edwin Hubble House =

- U.S. National Register of Historic Places
- U.S. National Historic Landmark
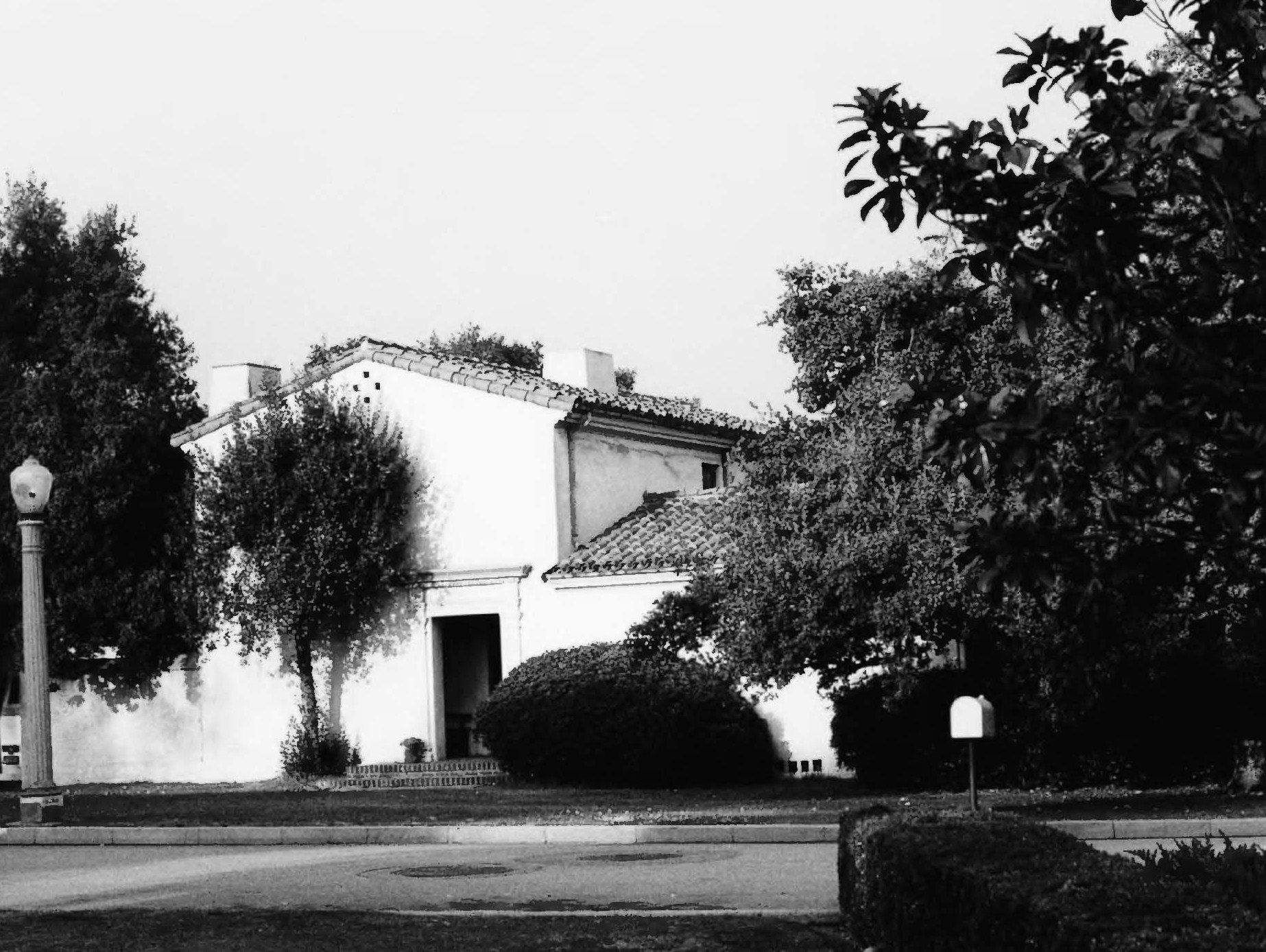
- Edwin Powell Hubble House in 1975

- Location within the Los Angeles metropolitan area Location within California Location within the United States
- Location: 1340 Woodstock Road, San Marino, California
- Coordinates: 34°7′23″N 118°7′15″W
- Area: less than one acre
- Built: 1925
- Architect: Joseph Kucera
- Architectural style: Modern Movement, California Mission
- NRHP reference No.: 76000494

Significant dates
- Added to NRHP: December 8, 1976
- Designated NHL: December 8, 1976

The Edwin Hubble House is a historic house in San Marino, California. Built in 1925, it was the home of astronomer Edwin Hubble (1889–1953) for most of his professional life. Hubble is renowned as one of the greatest astronomers of the 20th century, whose discoveries revolutionized the science. His home, still a private residence, was declared a National Historic Landmark in 1976.

== Description and history ==
The Edwin Hubble House is located in a residential area of western San Marino, on the east side of Woodstock Road near its cul-de-sac end. It is a two-story Mission Revival house, designed by Los Angeles architect Joseph Kucera and completed in 1925. The house is not of architectural significance; it is similar to many homes built in the Los Angeles area at that time. It was the home of astronomer Edwin Hubble from 1925 until his death in 1953.

Hubble is one of the major figures of 20th-century astronomy, today best known as the namesake of the Hubble Space Telescope. His discoveries made while working at the Observatories of the Carnegie Institution of Washington and the Mount Wilson Observatory revolutionized modern understanding of the cosmos, making it possible to determine with some accuracy the distance of remote objects. His discovery of increasing redshift in the light spectra emitted by distant objects is a major piece of evidence that the universe is expanding.

The Hubble House remained in the family until about 1973. It is still a private residence.

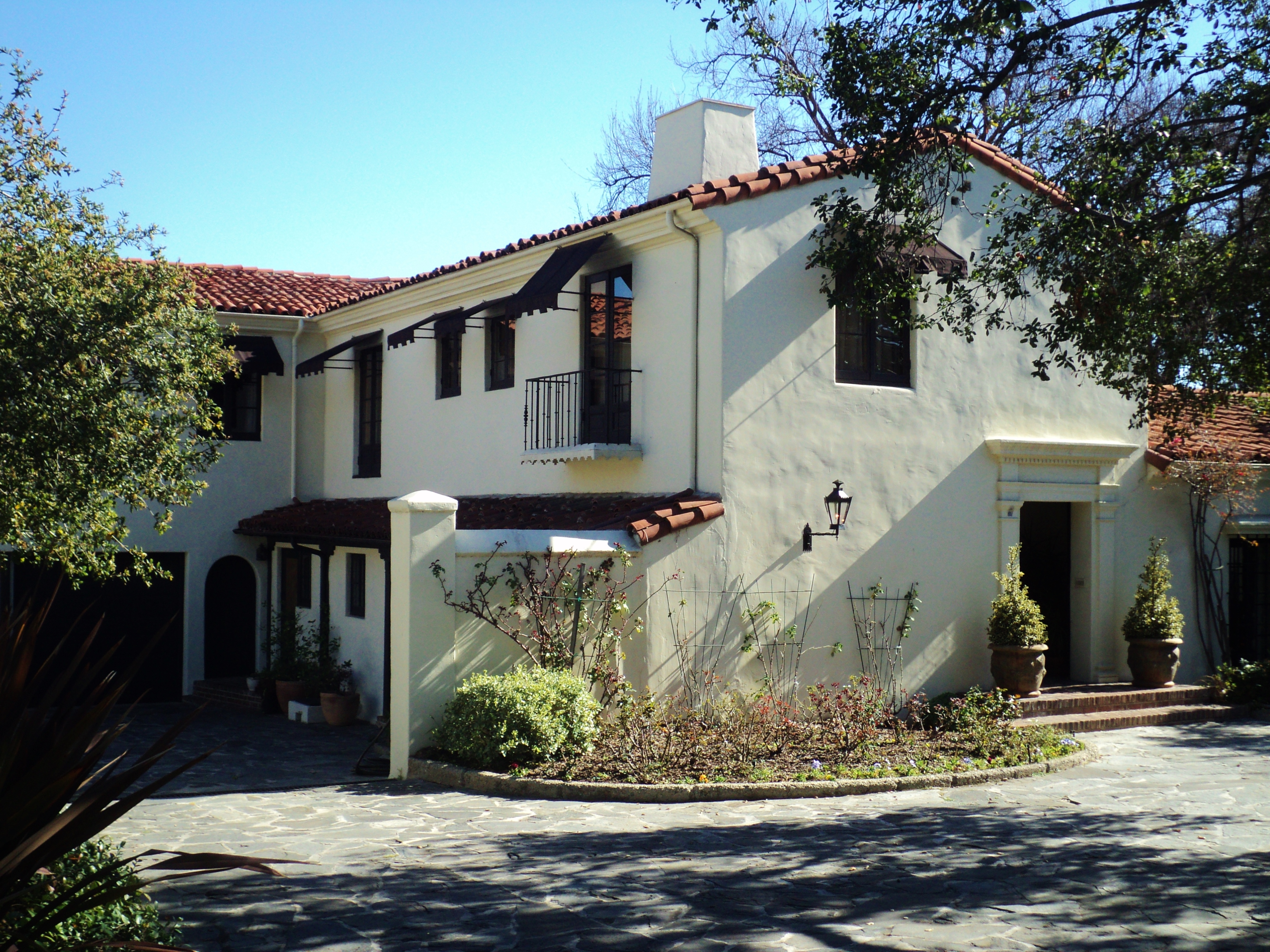
Edwin Hubble House in 2013

== See also ==
- List of National Historic Landmarks in California
- National Register of Historic Places listings in Los Angeles County, California
