= The Oaks (Monrovia, California) =

Historic house in California, United States

- Oaks, The
- U.S. National Register of Historic Places
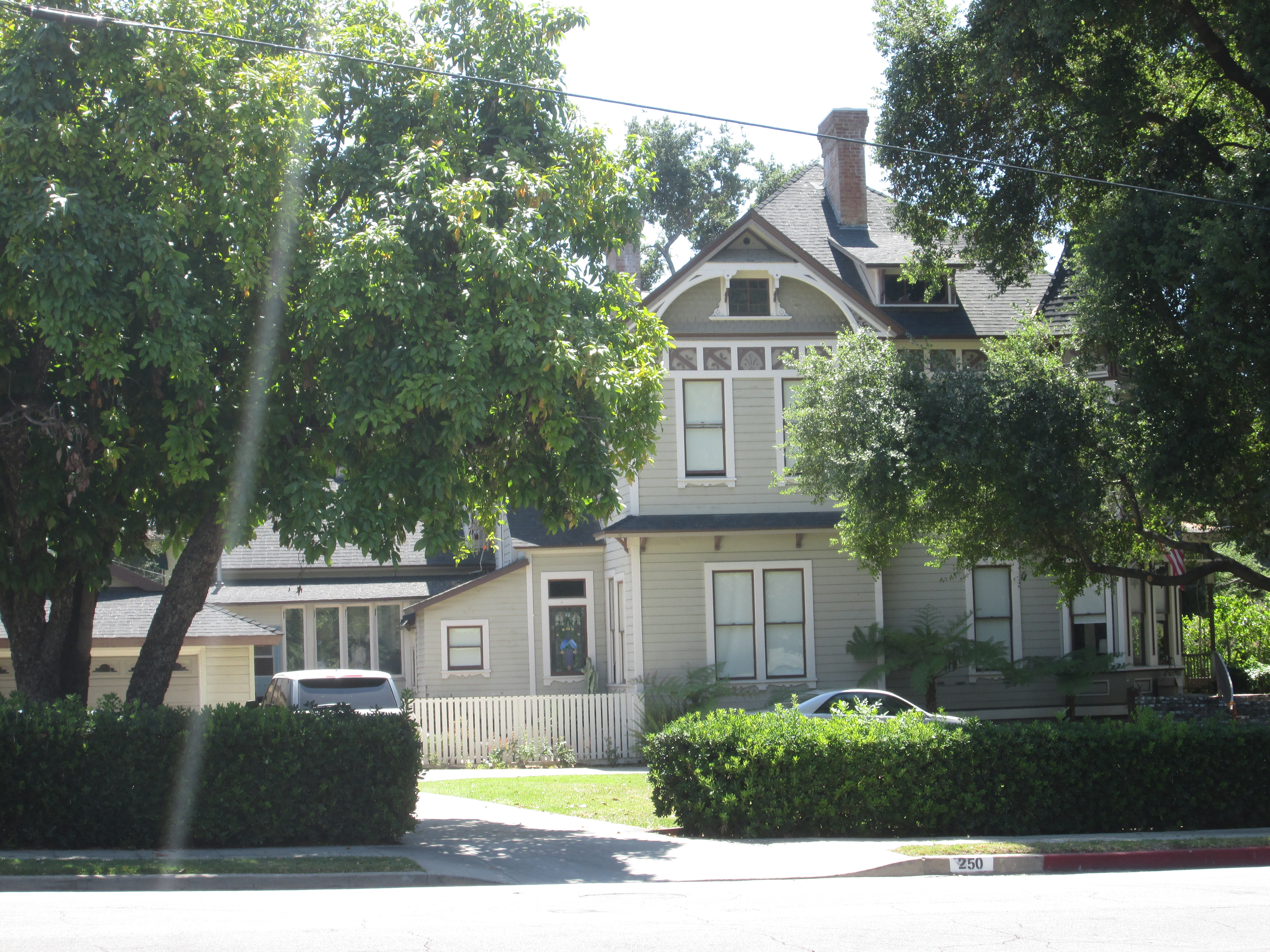
- The house in 2015

- Location within the Los Angeles metropolitan area Location within California Location within the United States
- Location: 250 N. Primrose Ave., Monrovia, California
- Coordinates: 34°9′21.9″N 118°0′10.7″W
- Built: 1885
- Architect: Solomon I. Haas
- Architectural style: Stick/Eastlake - Queen Anne Style
- NRHP reference No.: 78000692
- Added to NRHP: April 06, 1978

The Oaks, also known as William N. Monroe House, is a Stick/Eastlake Queen Anne Style house that was built in 1885. It is located in the San Gabriel Valley, in Monrovia, California.

== History ==
The house was built for William Newton Monroe, one of the founders and namesake of the city of Monrovia. Monroe lived in the house for only four years, after which it served a one-year stint as the Monrovia Ladies' College of the University of Southern California. It again served as a private residence until the 1940s when it became a boarding house. It was converted back a single family house in 1977.

The Oaks is the second oldest house in Monrovia, notable as a local example of Victorian architecture. It was listed on the National Register of Historic Places in 1978.
