= Walter D. Valentine Cottage B =

- Valentine, Walter D., Cottage B
- U.S. National Register of Historic Places
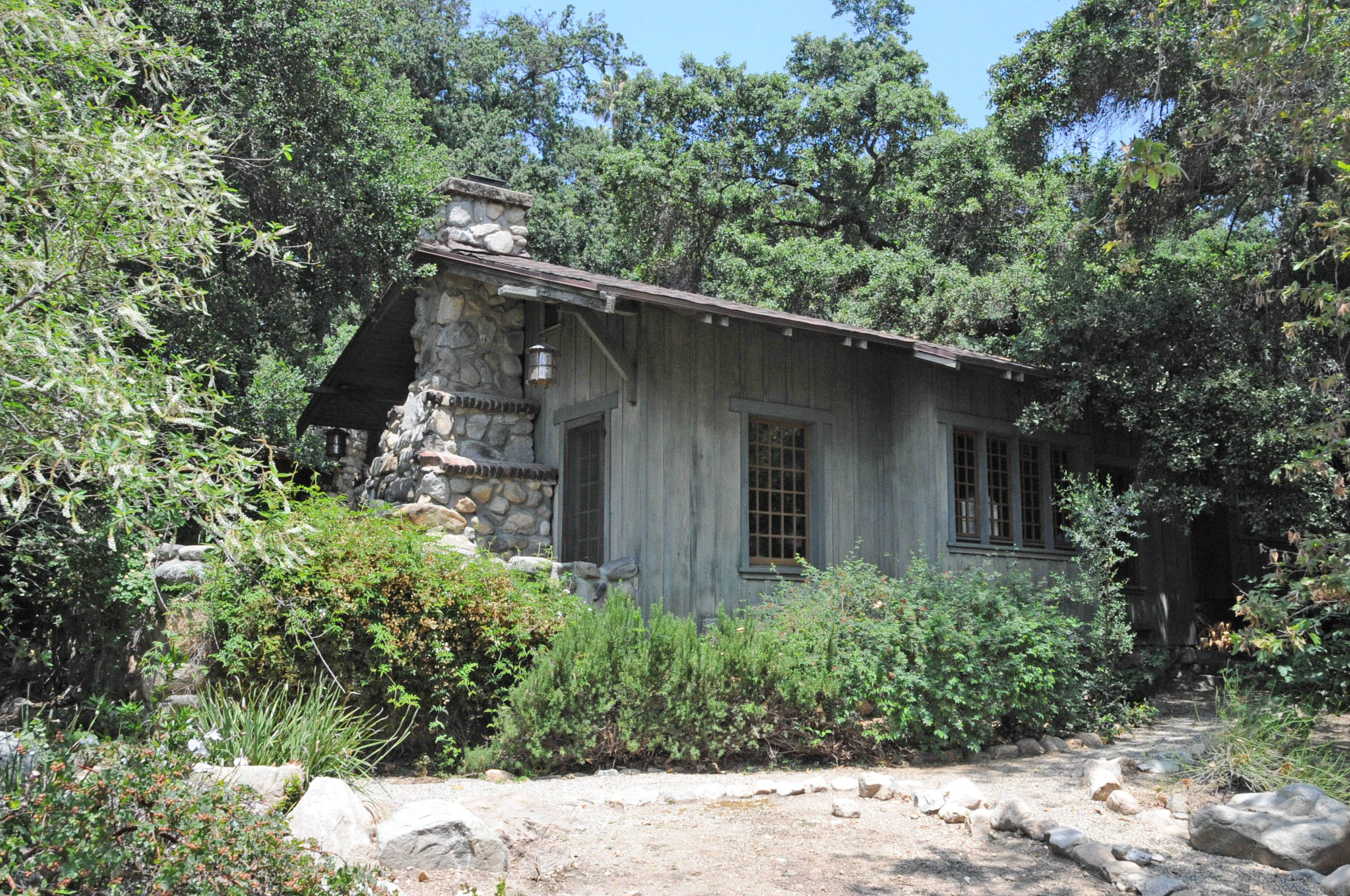

- Location within California
- Location: 1419 E. Palm St., Altadena, California
- Coordinates: 34°11′39″N 118°07′16″W
- Area: less than one acre
- NRHP reference No.: 100001337
- Added to NRHP: July 24, 2017

The Walter D. Valentine Cottage B, constructed in 1912, was a single-family Craftsman style building commissioned by Walter D. Valentine for construction in Altadena, California. Between 1922 and 1924, Henry Greene (of the architectural firm Greene and Greene) expanded the cabin's footprint.

On January 25, 2025, Los Angeles Conservancy confirmed that the cottage was one of more than 12,000 structures damaged in the January 2025 Southern California wildfires, specifically the Eaton Fire.
