= Keyes Bungalow =

Historic house in California, United States

- U.S. National Register of Historic Places
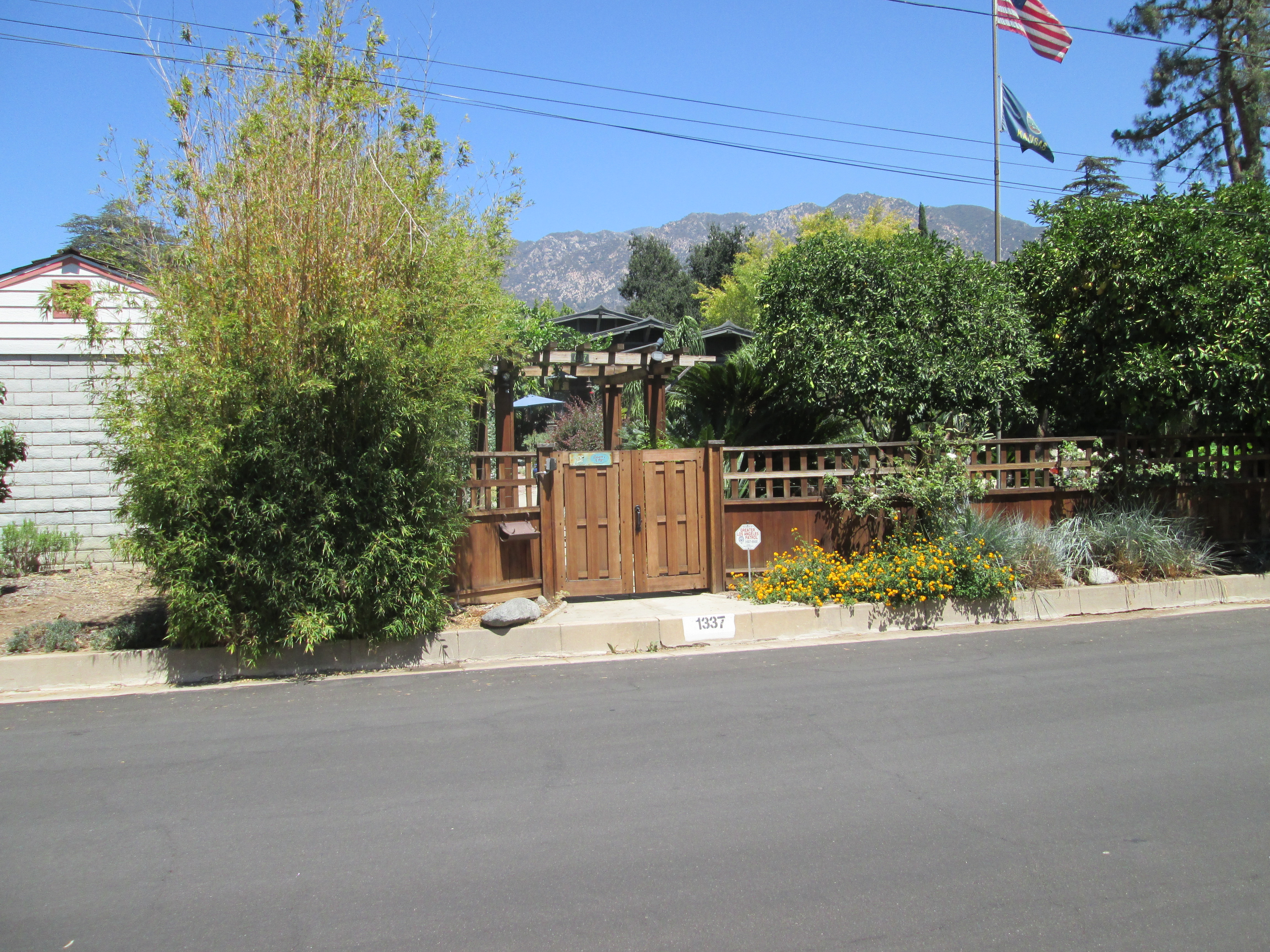
- The bungalow from the street

- Location within the Los Angeles metropolitan area
- Location: 1337 E. Boston St; Altadena, California
- Coordinates: 34°10′57″N 118°07′22″W
- Area: 0.3 acres (0.12 ha)
- Architectural style: California Bungalow-American Craftsman
- NRHP reference No.: 78000678
- Added to NRHP: November 14, 1978

Keyes Bungalow is a National Register of Historic Places structure in Altadena, California. It is also notable as being the home of Jackson Gregory an author of Westerns in the 1920s and 1930s. It remains a private home.

The Keyes Bungalow's architecture is also known as "airplane" style for its wide, shallow roofline that resembles airplane wings. It was placed on the Register in 1978 for its significance as an example of a Craftsman style home.

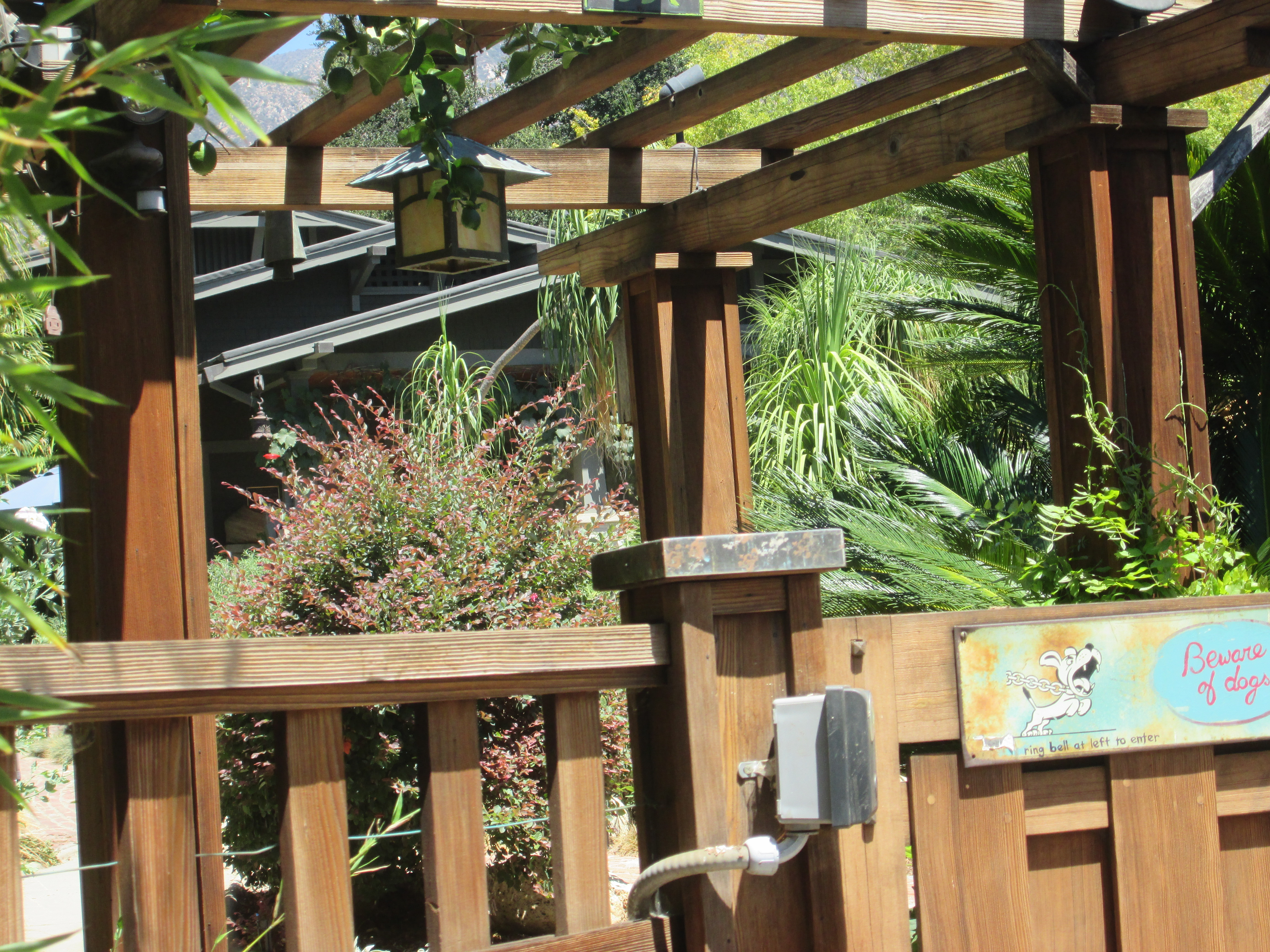
Obscured view of the bungalow, with the airplane roofline visible
