= Community Clubhouse =

- U.S. National Register of Historic Places
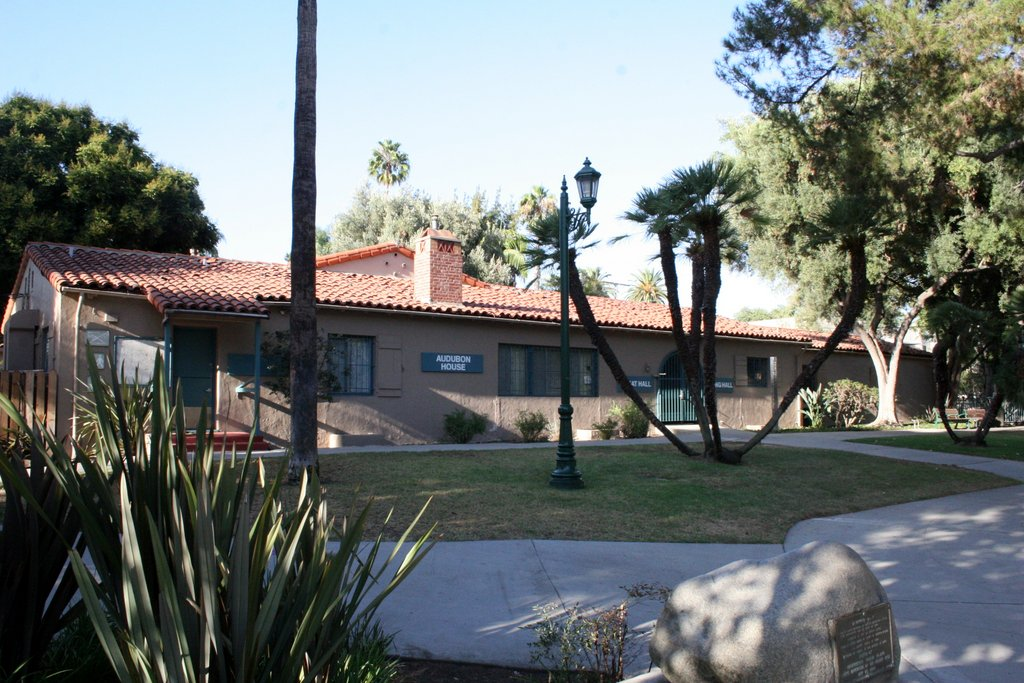
- The Community Clubhouse in 2014
- Interactive map of Community Clubhouse
- Location: 1200 North Vista Street, West Hollywood, California
- Coordinates: 34°5′35″N 118°21′4″W
- NRHP reference No.: 13000510
- Added to NRHP: July 23, 2013

The Community Clubhouse is a historic building in West Hollywood, California, U.S. It has been listed on the National Register of Historic Places since July 23, 2013.
