= Diamond Apartments =

- U.S. National Register of Historic Places
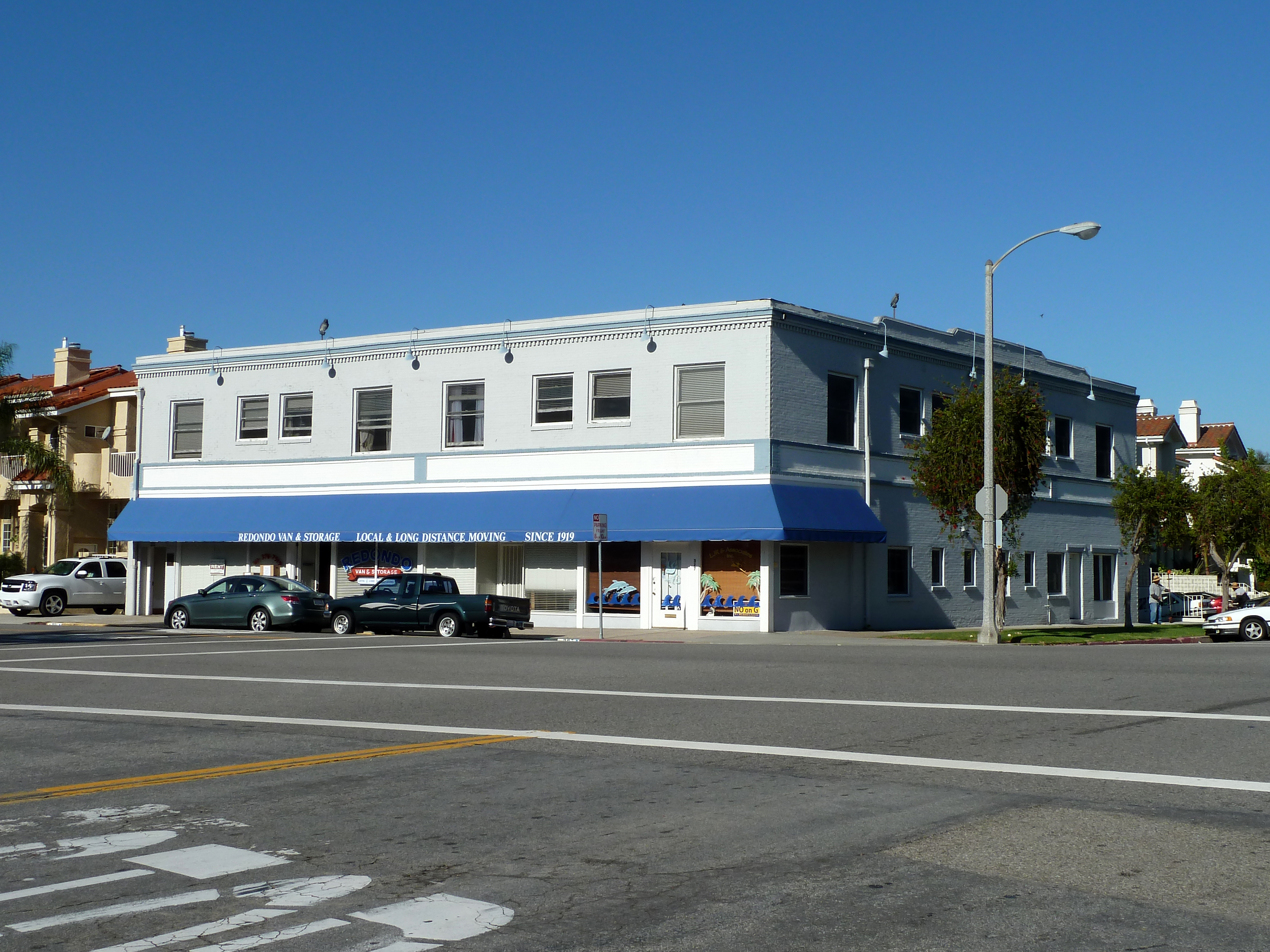

- Location within the Los Angeles metropolitan area Location within California Location within the United States
- Location: 321 Diamond St., Redondo Beach, California
- Coordinates: 33°50′39″N 118°23′16″W
- Area: 0.1 acres (0.040 ha)
- Built: 1913
- Built by: Meacham, Harry
- Architect: Pemberton, Lovell Bearse
- Architectural style: Classical Revival
- NRHP reference No.: 92000260
- Added to NRHP: March 26, 1992

The Diamond Apartments are an apartment building located at 321 Diamond St. in Redondo Beach, California. Built in 1913 by Harry Meacham, the apartment complex was the first commercial building in the surrounding neighborhood. Architect Lovell Pemberton designed the Classical Revival building. The first floor of the building held commercial space; early businesses in the building included a furniture store, a laundromat, and a paint store. Developers demolished all but three of Redondo Beach's downtown commercial buildings in the 1960s, leaving the apartment complex as the city's second-oldest standing commercial building and the oldest which has maintained its historic integrity.

The building was added to the National Register of Historic Places on March 26, 1992.
