= Russian Village District =

Historic district in California, United States

- U.S. National Register of Historic Places
- U.S. Historic district
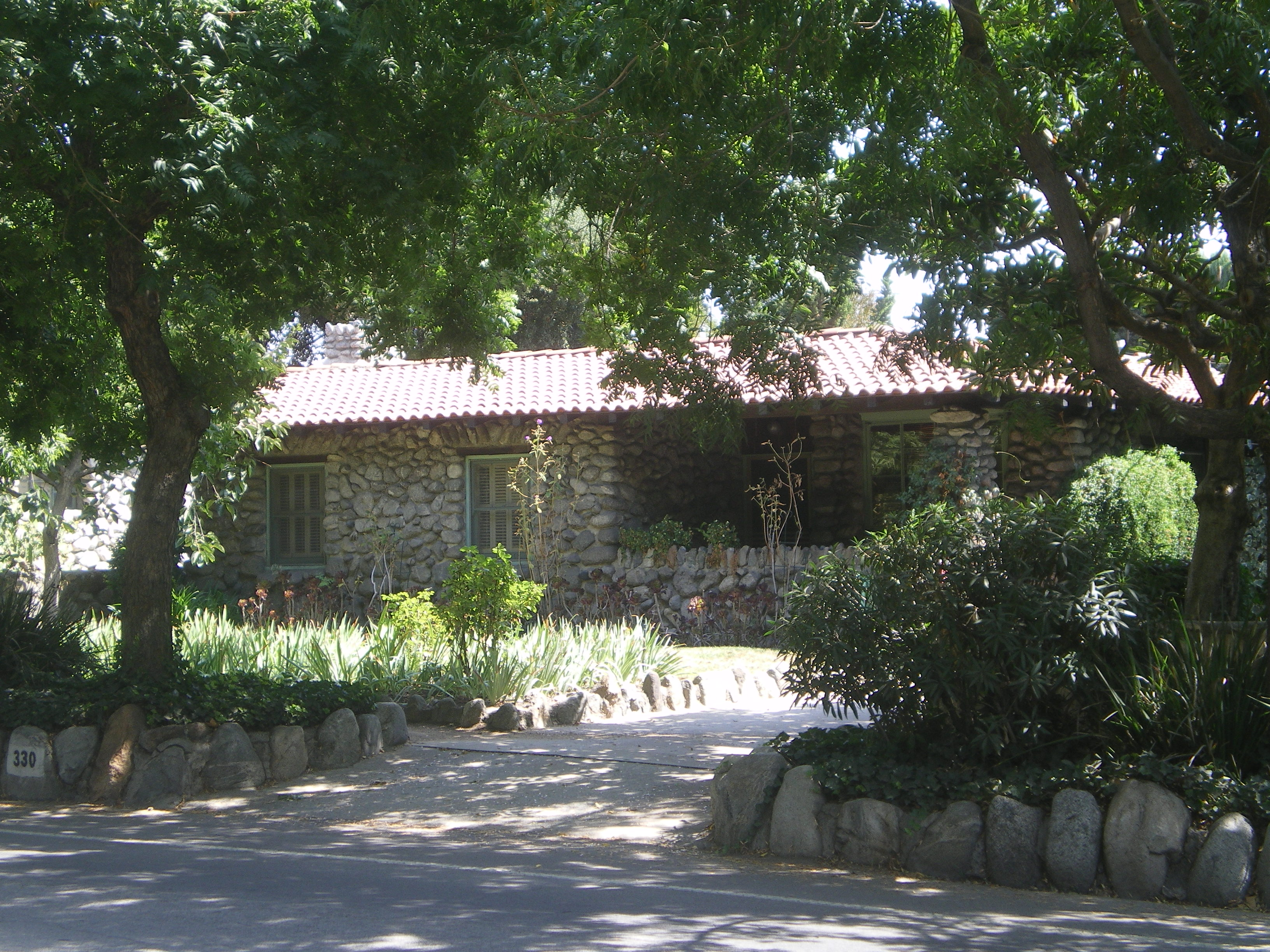
- House at 330 S. Mills Avenue

- Location within the Los Angeles metropolitan area Location within California Location within the United States
- Location: 290--370 S. Mills Ave. and 480 Cucamonga Ave., Claremont, California
- Coordinates: 34°5′25″N 117°42′25″W
- Area: 3.2 acres (1.3 ha)
- Architect: Konstanty Stys, et al.
- Architectural style: Folk architecture
- NRHP reference No.: 78000680
- Added to NRHP: December 28, 1978

The Russian Village District comprises 15 folk architecture style houses and was built by Konstanty ("Steve") Stys, a Polish (not Russian) immigrant, and others during the Great Depression. It is located at the intersection of South Mills Avenue and East Cucamonga Avenue in Claremont, California. Although the street addresses are in Claremont, portions of many of the parcels in the district lie within the city of Montclair in San Bernardino County. The historic district was listed in the National Register of Historic Places in 1978.

== History ==
Konstanty Stys (1894-1961) was born in Poland, immigrated to the United States and settled in Youngstown, Ohio. He became a steelworker, married and started a family. Stys and his family came to California in 1921 and lived in Pomona. He then moved to Claremont and found work in construction. He bought the land on the east side of Mills Avenue and began building his houses. The local residents nicknamed these houses the "Russian Village", assuming that Stys came from Russia.

Stys and the other people who built homes in the district had no formal training in the design and construction of houses. Only one house in the district was designed by a professional architect. The homes were built of local field stones from the alluvial plains around Claremont, as well as salvaged and recycled materials including the sides from railroad cars, debris remaining after the 1933 Long Beach earthquake, and materials from wrecking yards.

Many of Stys's friends were unemployed during the Great Depression and several lost their homes. Stys sold off portions of his land for low prices, often asking for no down payment, and helped them build inexpensive houses out of salvaged and recycled materials.

== Contributing properties ==
House at 290 South Mills Avenue. This house was constructed in 1927. The original interior was 700 square feet (65 m^{2}). The house is wood frame and the exterior is made of the local field stones. The interior framing of studs, rafters and joists are made up of used materials, some of the wood was previously painted and some had existing square-head nails.

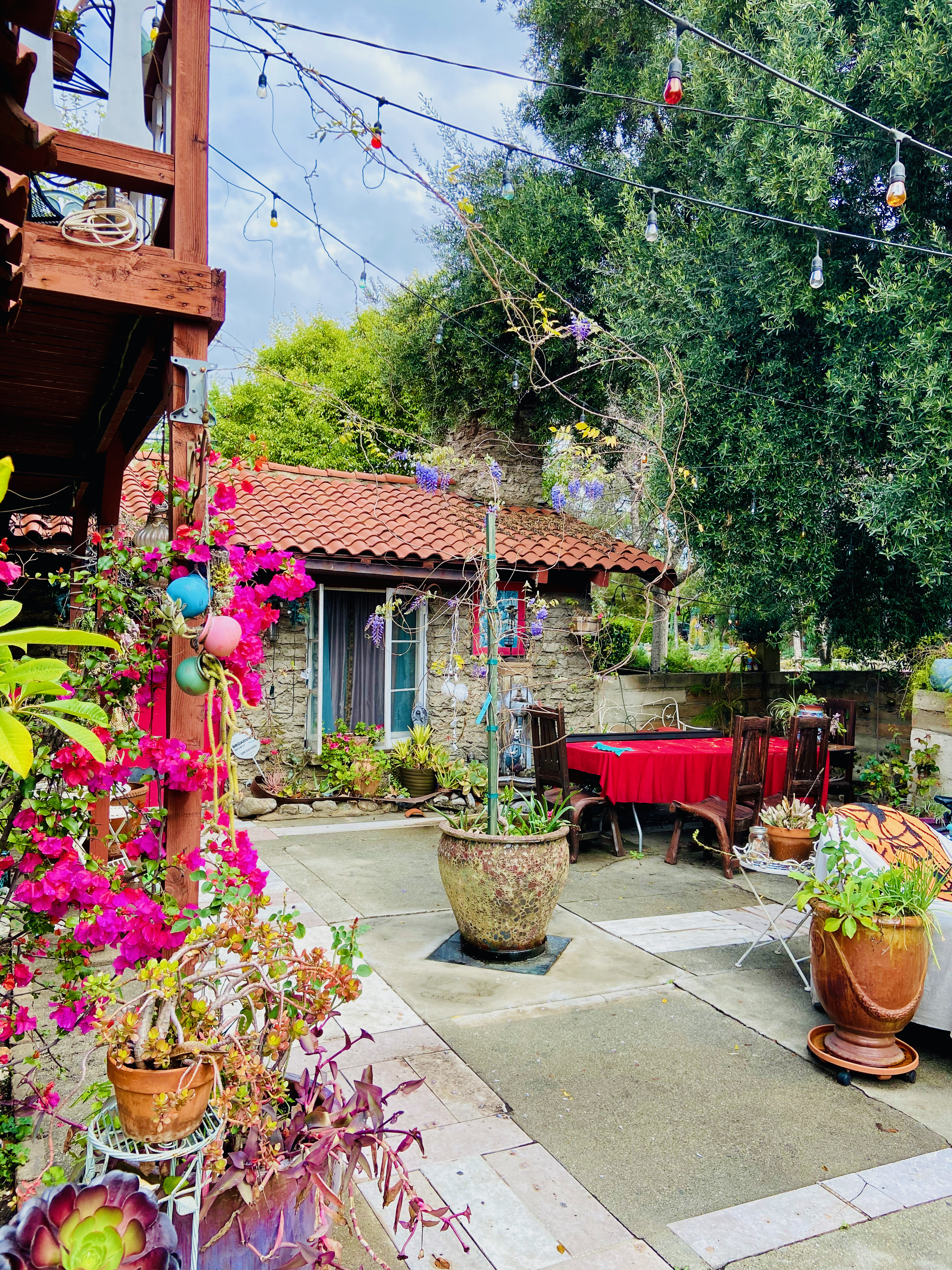
305 S. Mills Ave.

House at 305 South Mills Avenue. The parcel is located on the corner of South Mills Avenue and East Cucamonga Avenue. Originally built in 1937 as the office and workshop of the Lay-Mor block company owned by Konstanty Stys and Merle Mead, the office has been a private home for several decades and the workshop has been restored. The buildings are made of the Lay-Mor blocks, local river rock in the hearth, and various salvaged materials including sidewalk concrete and telephone poles.

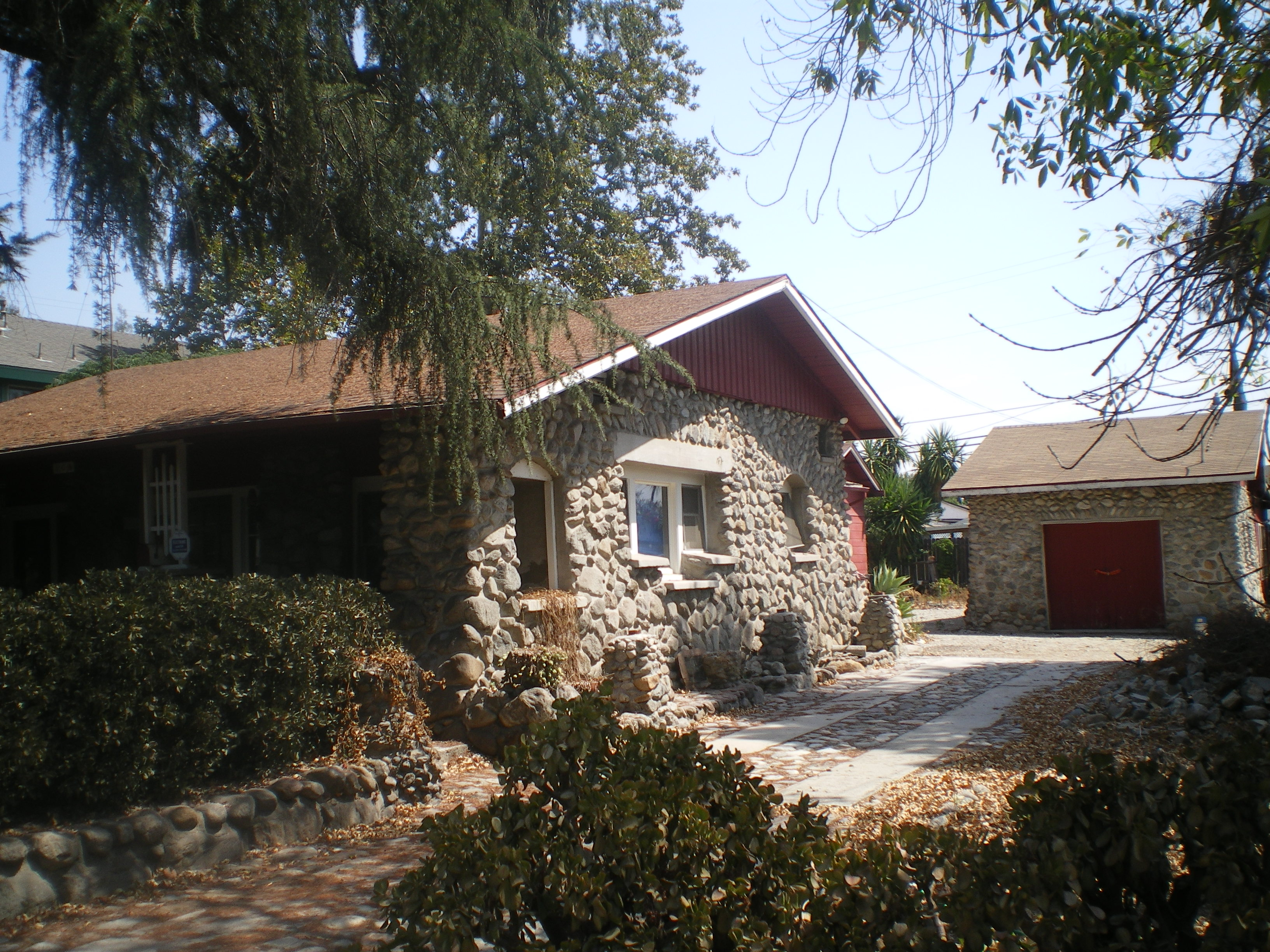
306 S. Mills Ave.

House at 306 South Mills Avenue. The parcel that house sits on is partially within the city of Montclair. This is the first house built in what would become the Russian Village. It was built by Konstanty Stys as his own house. Stys began building on this parcel in 1923. The first structure was the garage, where Stys and his family lived while he built the main house. The main house was completed in 1925. The exterior of the house is made up wood siding and stone. Stys landscaped the yard with stone walkways, planters, and walls.

House at 315 South Mills Avenue. The house was built in 1935 by Stys and Mead. The exterior is made of pavement blocks and stucco.

House at 316 South Mills Avenue. The parcel that this house sits on is partially within the city of Montclair. This house was built in 1932 by Raymond Yerkes. During the two years that this house was under construction, Yerkes was living in Pomona. Yerkes was helped by Stys and another neighbor, Merle Mead. The house was built of stone as well as concrete forms from construction sites of Pomona College. A railroad tie was used to support the large window in the living room. In 1938, the garage was converted into a studio. The interior walls and cupboards of the studio were made of wood recovered from a railroad car.

House and apartment at 330 and 336 South Mills Avenue. This parcel partially lies within the city of Montclair. This house was built in 1933 by Stys for Floyd Underwood. This house is the only one in the district designed by an architect. Peter Ficker, the architect, owed Stys for some work Stys did. In lieu of payment, Ficker designed the house. Stys misread the plans, and started building the house in the wrong part of the lot. Underwood then sold the house to Stys. The house has exteriors of stone. The interior doors were salvaged from the demolition of the Raymond Hotel in Pasadena. Stys rented the house out before selling it to Erle Bunker in 1938

The apartment was built over the garage by Bunker in the early 1940s.

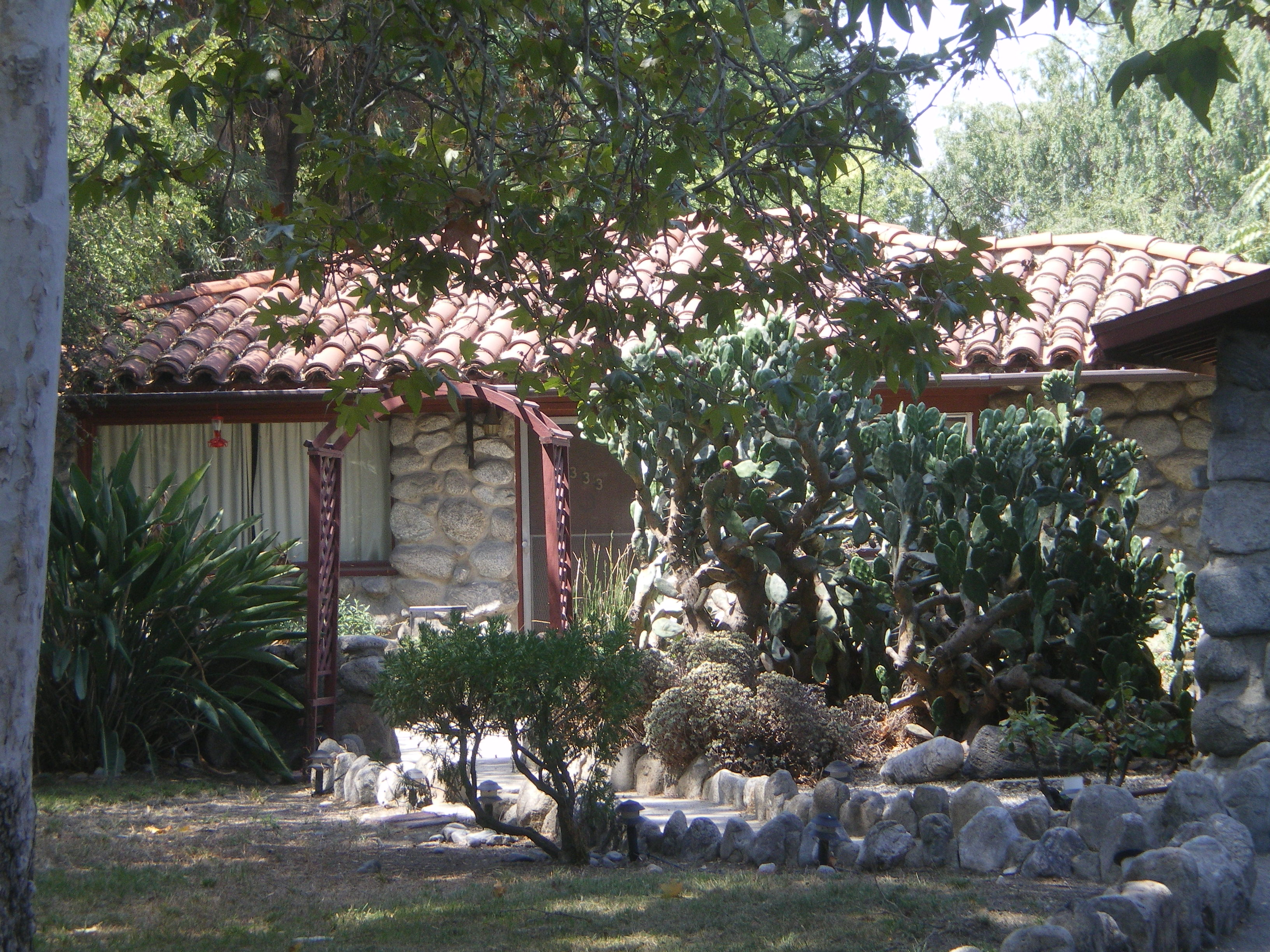
333 S. Mills Ave.

House at 333 South Mills Avenue. Stys began construction of this house, then gave it to his niece and her husband, Clarence Michael, as a wedding gift. Michael continued construction of the house and completed it in 1933. The exterior of the house is stone, with railroad ties used as supports in the windows.

House at 339 South Mills Avenue. This house was built in 1939 by Clarence Michael, nephew by marriage of Stys. The Michaels first lived next door in a smaller house at 333 S. Mills Ave. The exterior was made of stone, the tiles for the roof came from a school in Placentia that was damaged in the 1933 Long Beach earthquake, and the interior walls and framing came from salvage and wrecking yards.

Houses at 343, 345, and 353 South Mills Avenue. These three interconnected houses were built by Stys in 1936 for use by an extended family. The center house at 345 S. Mills Ave is two stories. The exterior is red sandstone salvaged from the old courthouse in Los Angeles when it was razed. The supports for the staircase in the center house are made of telephone poles.

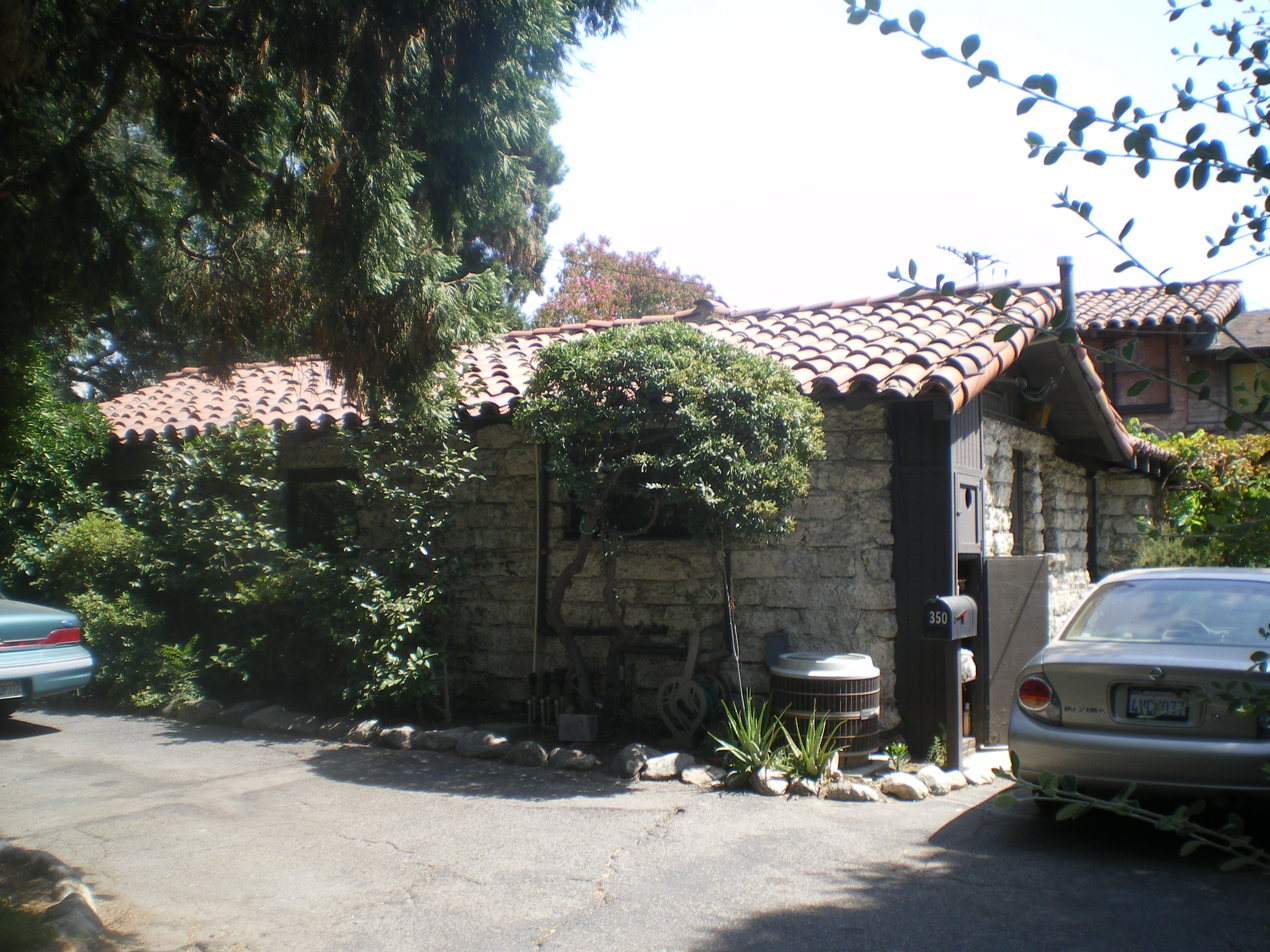
350 S. Mills Ave.

House at 350 South Mills Avenue. The parcel partially lies within the city of Montclair. This house was built in 1935 by Stys and is in an 'H' shape. There is a second story on the leg at the rear of the house. The exterior walls were made of concrete blocks recovered from street repairs. The local highway department crews delivered these blocks to Stys at Stys's request. The interior walls were made of wood salvaged from wrecking yards. The tiles for the roof came the school in Placentia that was damaged in the 1933 Long Beach earthquake.

House at 365 South Mills Avenue. This house was built in 1935 by Paul Honneker. The exterior is stone and stucco. There are stone walls and planters in the yards of the house.

House at 369 South Mills Avenue. This house was built as a garage and workshop in 1938. The exterior is field stone. It was converted into a home in the early 1950s.

House at 370 South Mills Avenue. This house, at the corner of S. Mills ave. and Moreno St., was built in 1928 and is mostly in Montclair, California. Burton Blanchard paid Stys $400 for the lot. Stys advised Burton on the construction. The exterior is made of up concrete blocks taken from San Antonio Avenue and Holt Boulevard during repairs of those streets. The roof tiles were taken from a school in Glendora that was being demolished. The interior materials include pavement, railroad ties, and oil cans filled with cement. An addition was made to the house in the 1940s. Former residents of the house include the actor Maurice Jara and the composer Daniel James Wolf

House at 480 East Cucamonga Avenue. This house was built in 1934 by Merle Mead. Mead was a carpenter. The house was originally built as a garage, but Mead changed his mind. Mead and Stys were in business together in the manufacture of interlocking blocks that they called "Lay-Mor". The house is built of the Lay-Mor blocks.

== Cucamonga properties ==
A satellite of Russian Village is the present-day Cask 'n Cleaver restaurant in Cucamonga, originally an orchard house designed and built by Stys. Adjacent and north of the Cask 'n Cleaver buildings, a low-lying stone wall and seven redwood bungalows, built by Stys, and made from lumber recovered from wreckage in the Long Beach earthquake were demolished for the new Los Amigos city park, reusing lumber for a shade structure, and river rocks to ornate some structures. Rancho Cucamonga Redevelopment Agency was awarded a Proposition 84 grant in 2011, acquired the property, construction began in March 2016, and opened in Spring 2017.

== Significance ==
Stys bought the land around S. Mills Ave in the 1920s and built his first house. The house was built of local materials and items that he salvaged, recycled and reused. During the Great Depression, Stys sold portions of his land to friends and acquaintances for low prices and loans that incurred little to no interest. Stys helped these people build houses with native rocks and items recycled from salvage yards, demolished buildings, and construction debris from roads and buildings (notably from construction of the Claremont Colleges).

Stys first helped Merle Mead, who built his house on Cucamonga Ave. Stys and Mead then helped Raymond Yerkes. Stys gave a house to his niece as a wedding gift. Burton Blanchard was 19 years old when Stys sold him a parcel of land without any down payment. It was the hard times of the Depression that helped to create this sense of community in these houses. The use of salvaged materials was an economic way to build houses.

There was no plan in the creation of this district. The houses were built at random. They became unified by the use of the same materials and by the association of the owners to Konstanty Stys.

The district was listed in the National Register of Historic Places because of the unique nature of the folk architecture and also because of the social and economic setting during the Great Depression that allowed for these 15 houses to be built.
