= San Jose Township, Los Angeles County, California =

Defunct Township

Coordinates: 34°04′40″N 117°46′34″W

Historical population
Census	Pop.	Note	%±
1860	463		—
1870	434		−6.3%
1880	1,170		169.6%
U.S. Decennial Census; 1860 1870 1880; 1890 1900 1910; 1920 1930 1940; 1950 1960

San Jose Township was a township in Los Angeles County, California. It existed prior to the abolition of townships in California, and appeared as a subdivision of Los Angeles County in the 1860, 1870 and 1880 U.S. Censuses. Its area encompassed Rancho San Jose, the eastern portions of the county drained by San Jose Creek, including what is now the cities of Pomona, Claremont and Walnut. In 1880, it was recorded as having 1170 residents - which made it one of the smallest townships in Los Angeles County, but nevertheless a sizable settlement in the region, larger than Bakersfield and slightly smaller than Riverside (in that year, there were only three settlements with populations above 1000 in Southern California outside Los Angeles and Ventura counties.)

The territory of the township included, among others, villages known as Spadra and Lordsburg. Louis Phillips, reportedly the richest man in Los Angeles County in the late 19th century, was one of the residents of Spadra. The township was crossed by two east-west railroads, California Central Railway (later Southern California Railway and eventually Atchison, Topeka and Santa Fe Railway) to the north, with a train station at Lordsburg, and Southern Pacific Railroad to the south, with a station at Spadra (ten miles east of Puente and three miles west of Pomona.) Lordsburg was eventually incorporated as La Verne, California, and Spadra was annexed by Pomona.

The United States Census Bureau continued to profile townships in California until 1960 when it switched to reporting newly defined Divisions which were not coterminous with the prior township boundaries.
