= Pomona, California =

City in California, United States

- City
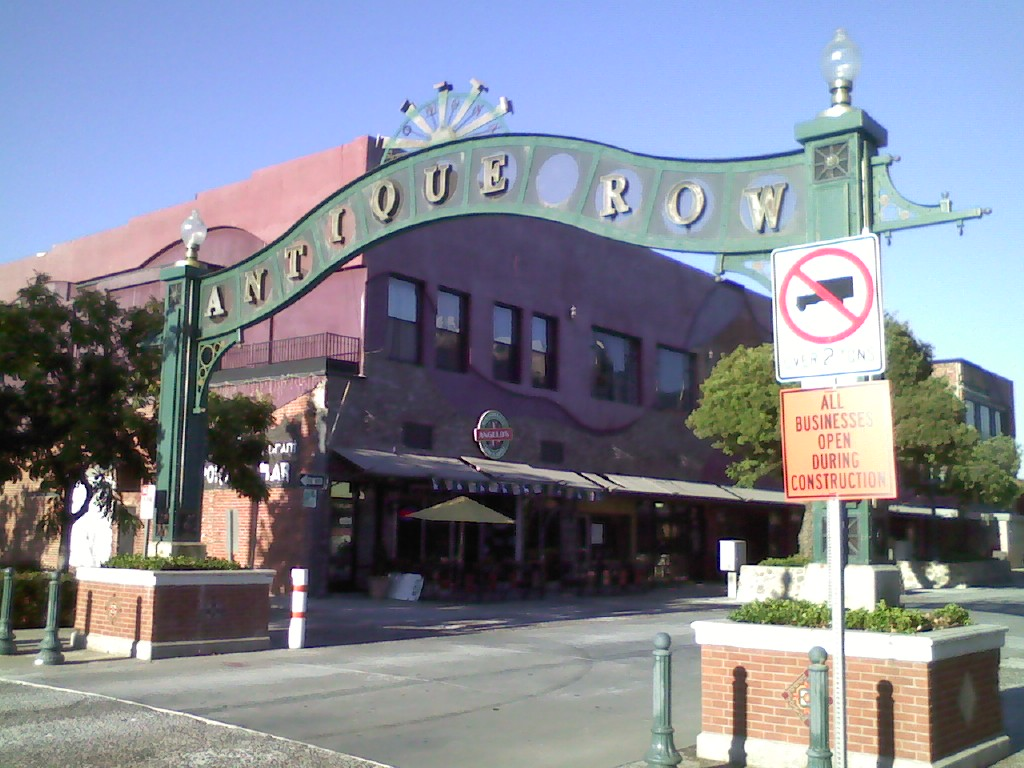
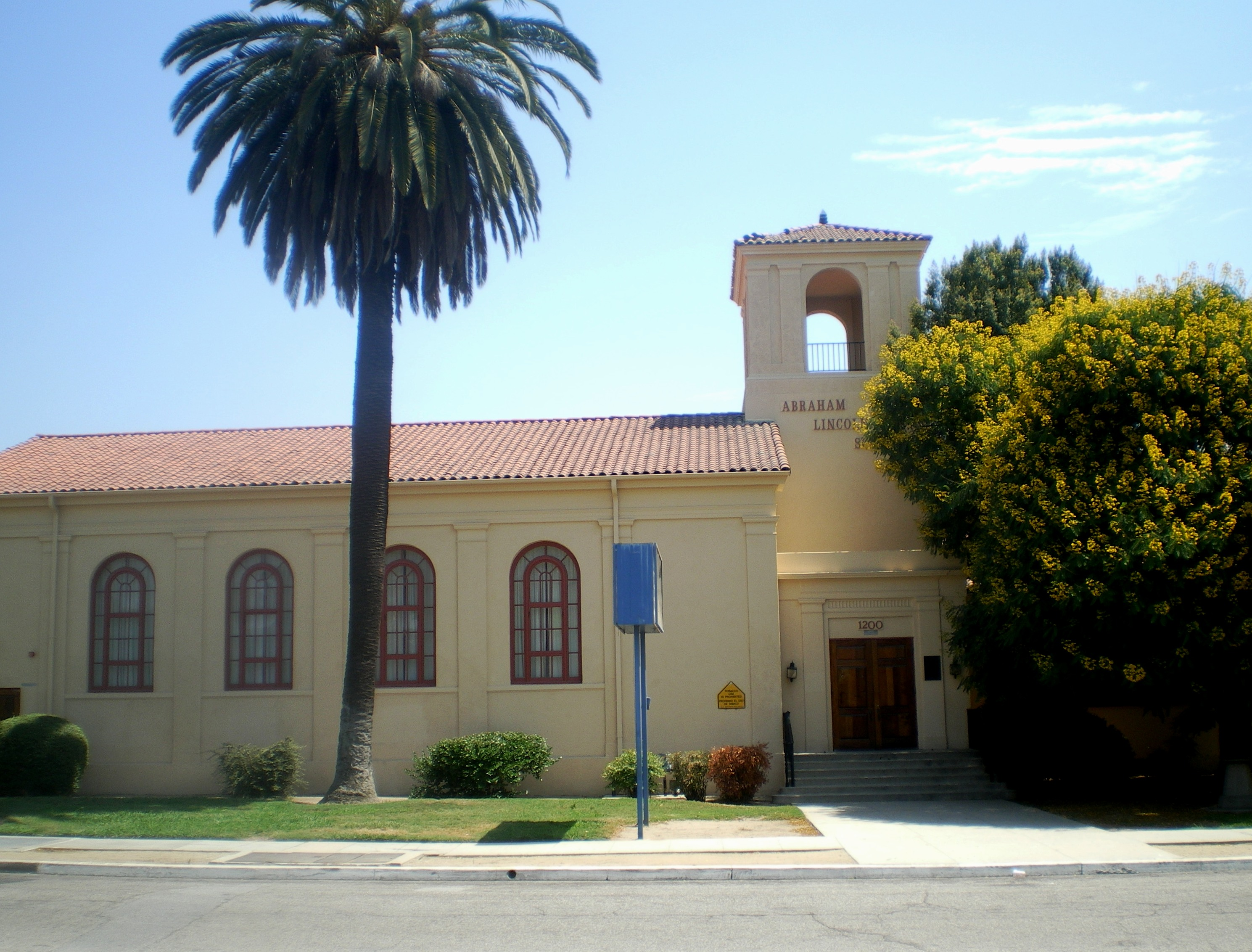
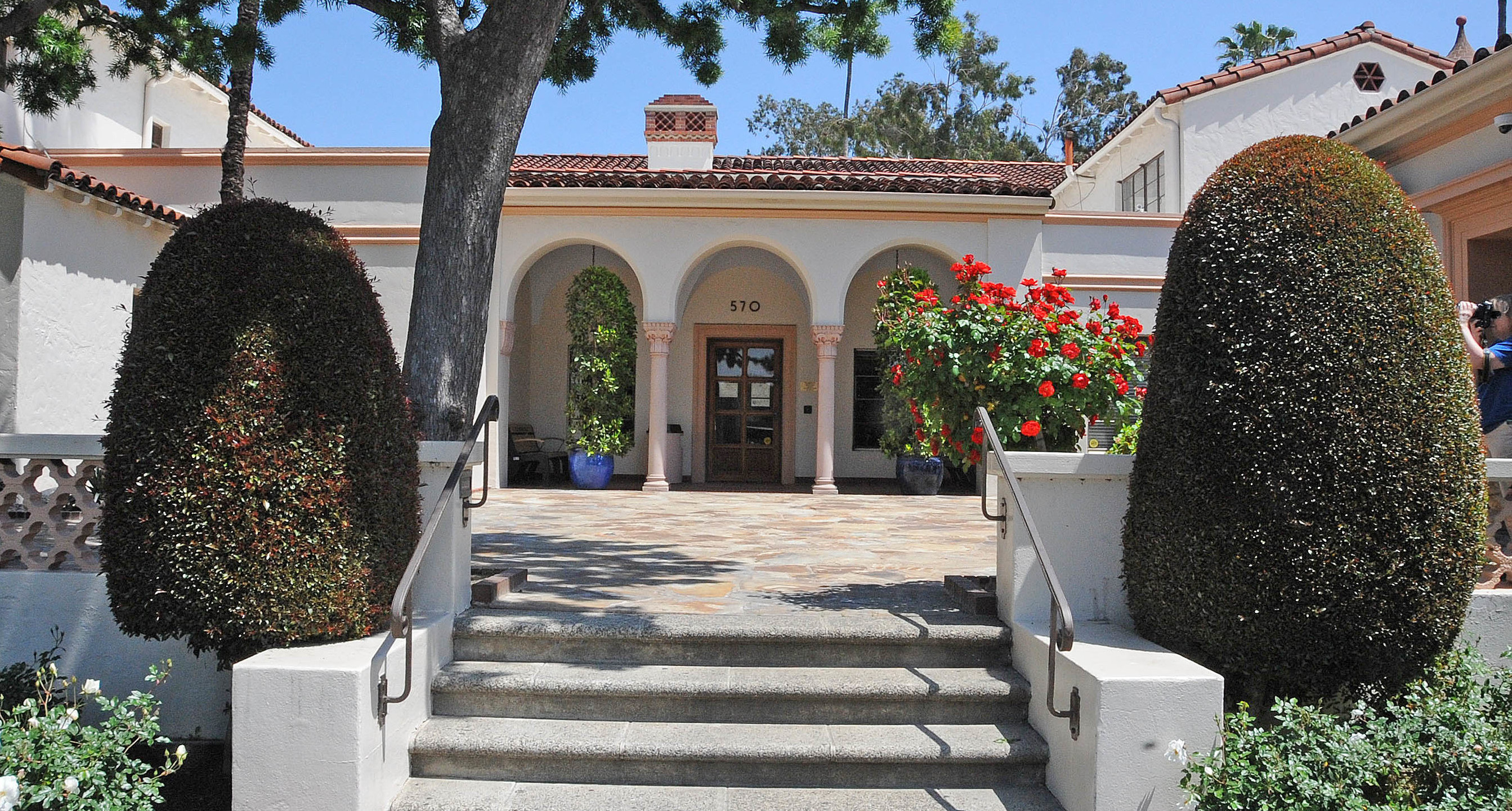
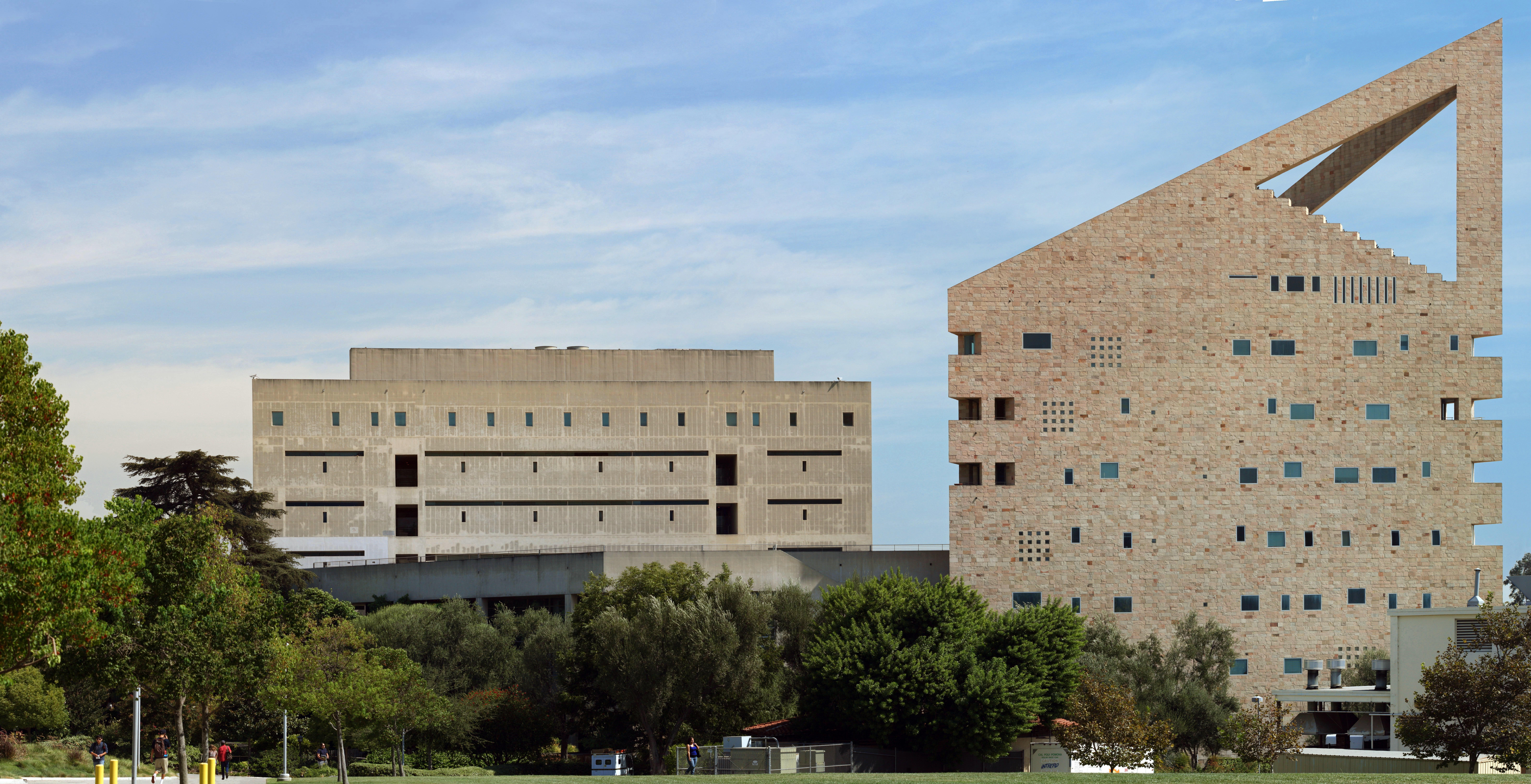
- Clockwise from top: Antique Row, Abraham Lincoln Elementary School, California State Polytechnic University, Pomona, Lincoln Park Historic District

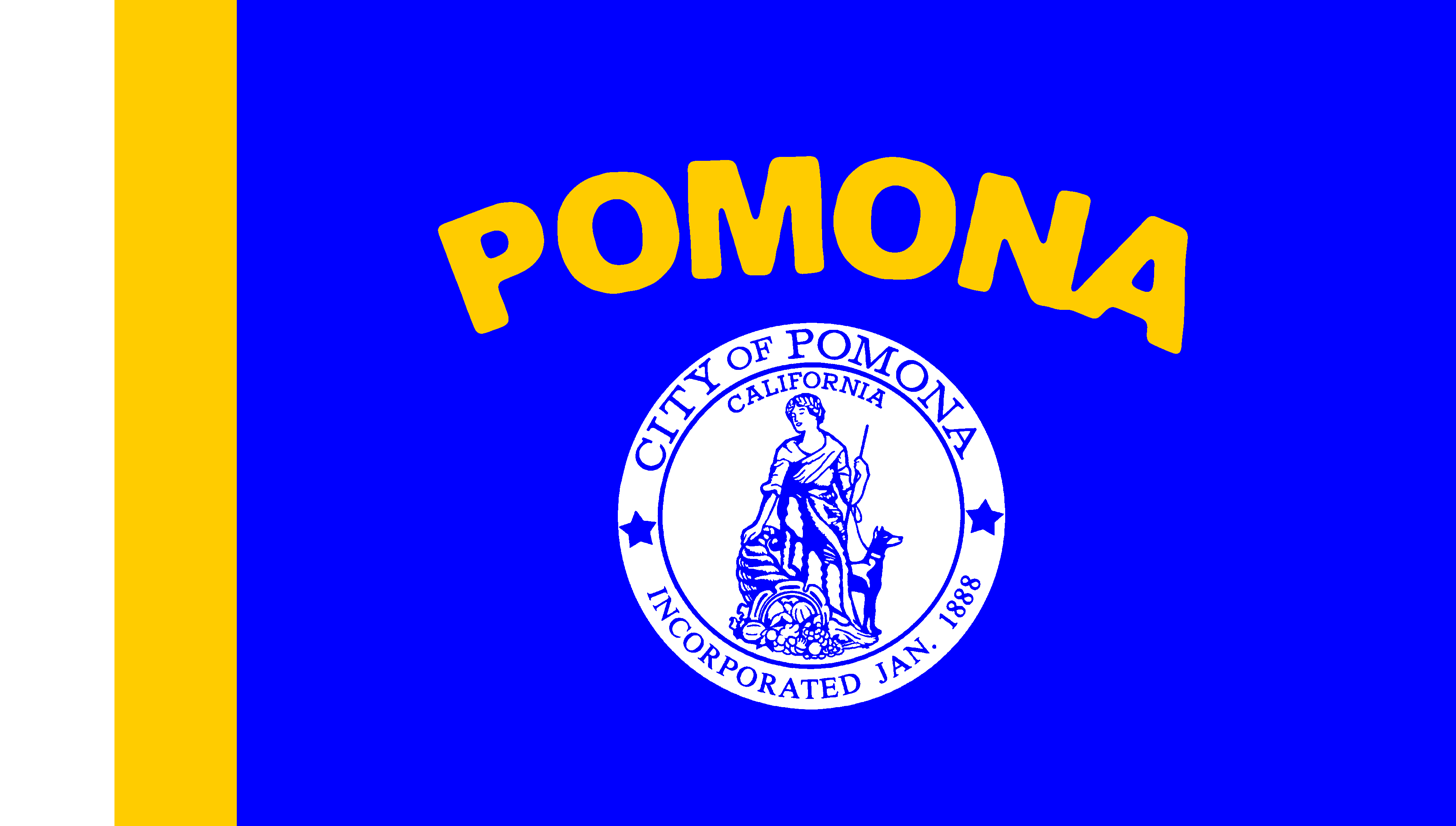
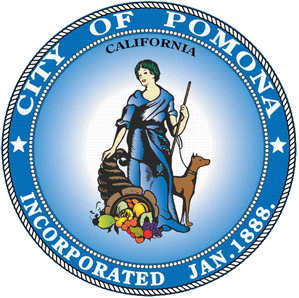
- Flag Seal
- Motto: "Vibrant – Safe – Beautiful"
- Interactive map of Pomona, California
- Location of Pomona, California in the United States Pomona (California) Pomona (the United States)
- Coordinates: 34°3′39″N 117°45′21″W
- Country: United States
- State: California
- County: Los Angeles
- Settled: 1830s
- Incorporated: January 6, 1888
- Named for: Pomona, a Roman goddess of fruitful abundance

Government
  - Type: Council-Manager
  - Mayor: Tim Sandoval
  - Vice Mayor: Steve Lustro
  - City Council: Debra Martin; Victor Preciado; Nora Garcia; Elizabeth Ontiveros-Cole; Lorraine Canales
  - City Manager: Anita D. Scott
  - Deputy City Manager: Mark Gluba

Area
  - Total: 22.99 sq mi (59.54 km^{2})
  - Land: 22.98 sq mi (59.52 km^{2})
  - Water: 0.012 sq mi (0.03 km^{2}) 0.05%
- Elevation: 850 ft (259 m)

Population (2020)
  - Total: 151,713
  - Estimate (2025): 147,807
  - Rank: 7th in Los Angeles County; 39th in California; 188th in the United States
  - Density: 6,602/sq mi (2,549/km^{2})
- Time zone: UTC−8 (Pacific)
  - Summer (DST): UTC−7 (PDT)
- ZIP Codes: 91766–91768
- Area code: 909
- FIPS code: 06-58072
- GNIS feature IDs: 1661247, 2411454
- Website: www.pomonaca.gov

Pomona (/pəˈmoʊnə/ pə-MOH-nə) is a city in the San Gabriel Valley of eastern Los Angeles County, California, United States. It is the most populous city in the San Gabriel Valley region and it has a population of 151,713 as of the 2020 census. The main campus of California State Polytechnic University, Pomona, also known as Cal Poly Pomona, lies partially within Pomona's city limits.

== History ==
=== Beginnings to 1880 ===
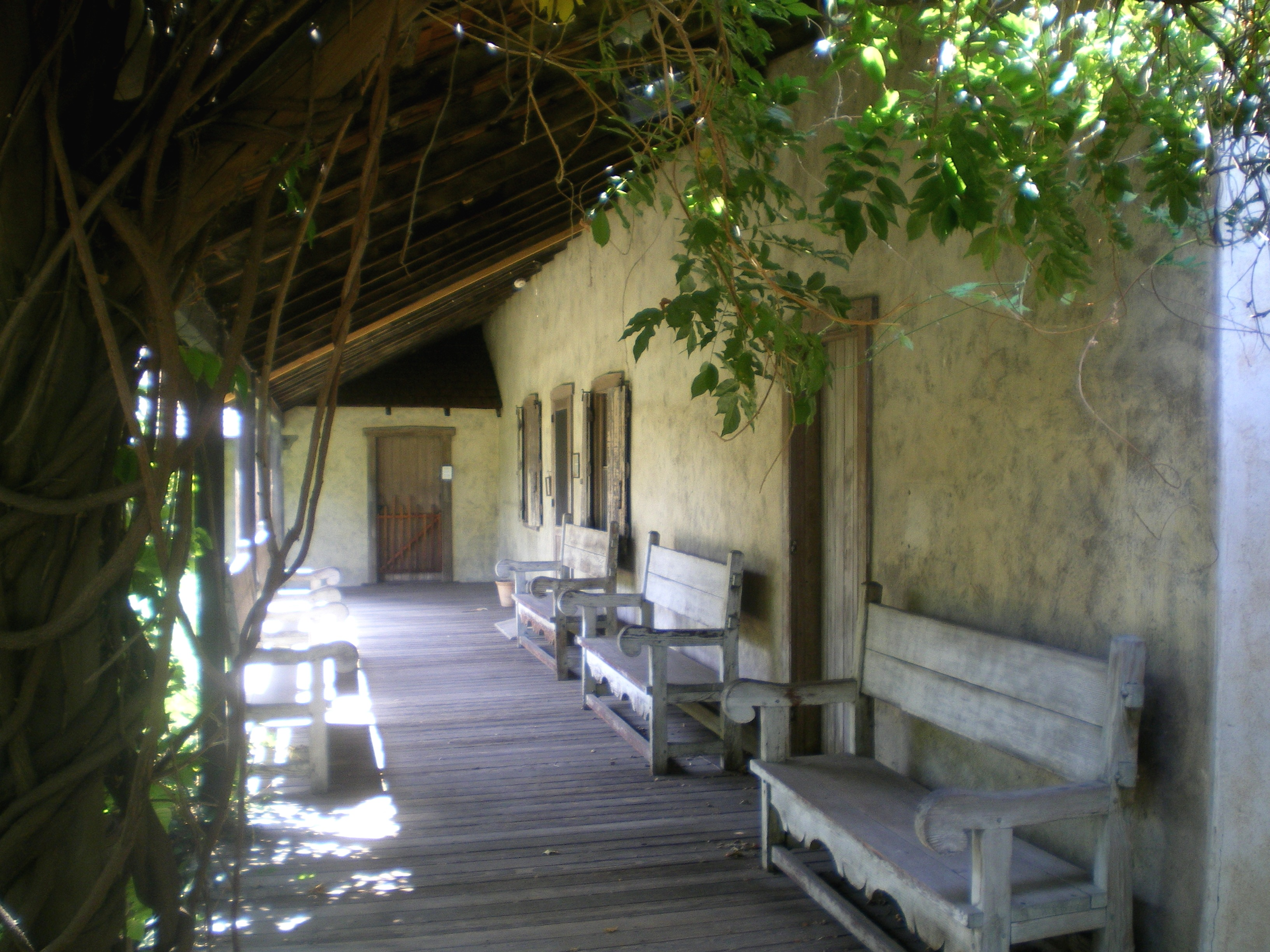
The Adobe de Palomares, built in 1855 by Ygnacio Palomares, is the oldest building in Pomona.

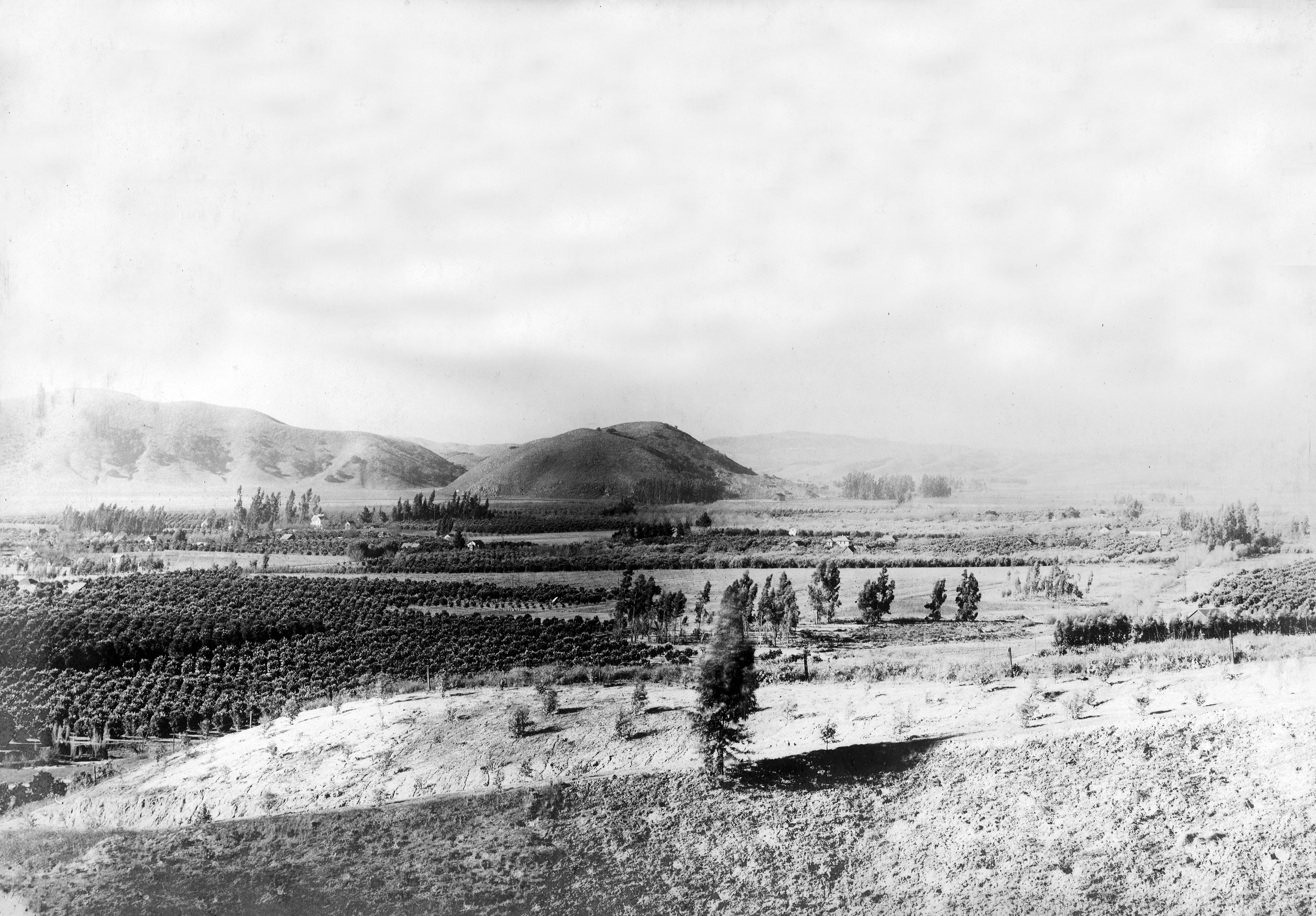
View to the west-southwest down San Jose Creek from Pomona Park (now Ganesha Park) in 1904. Elephant Hill is in the center distance.

At the time Spanish conquistadors first arrived in California, the Tongva people inhabited what is now Pomona and the LA Basin. The area eventually became part of Mexico, and what is now Pomona was claimed by Ricardo Véjar and Ygnacio Palomares in the 1830s.

The first Anglo-Americans arrived prior to 1848 when the signing of the Treaty of Guadalupe Hidalgo resulted in California becoming part of the United States.

In 1875, a group of real estate developers called the Los Angeles Immigration and Land Cooperative Association held a contest to name the burgeoning town. The winning entry, submitted by citrus worker Solomon Gates, was Pomona, the name of the Roman goddess of fruit.

=== Spadra ===
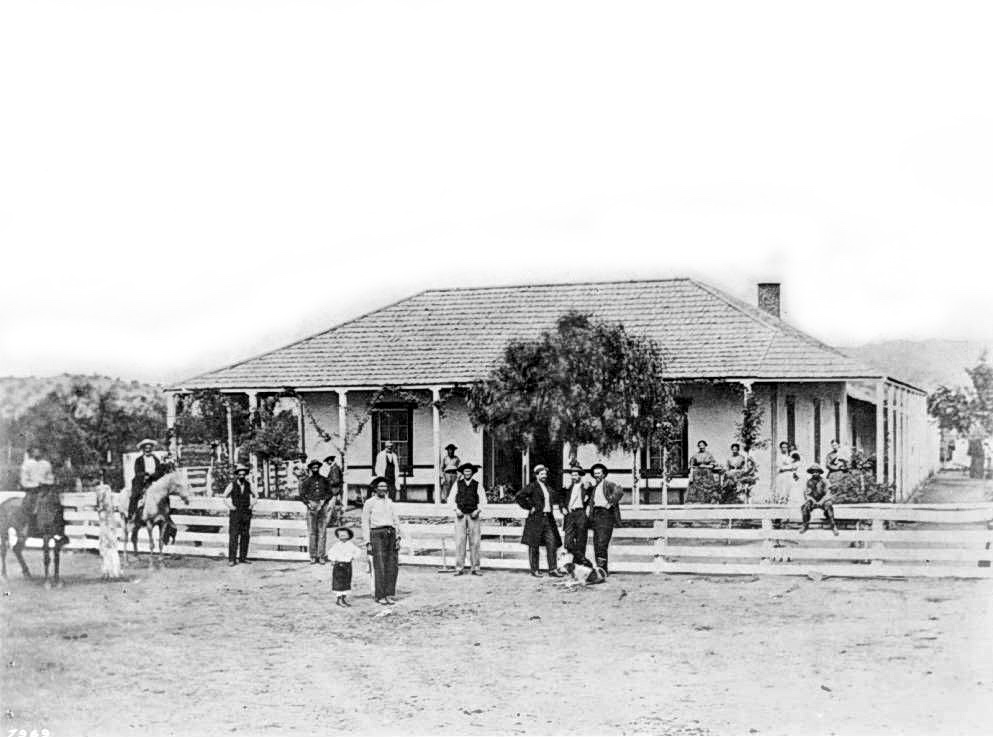
Rubottom's Hotel and stagecoach station at Spadra, 1867

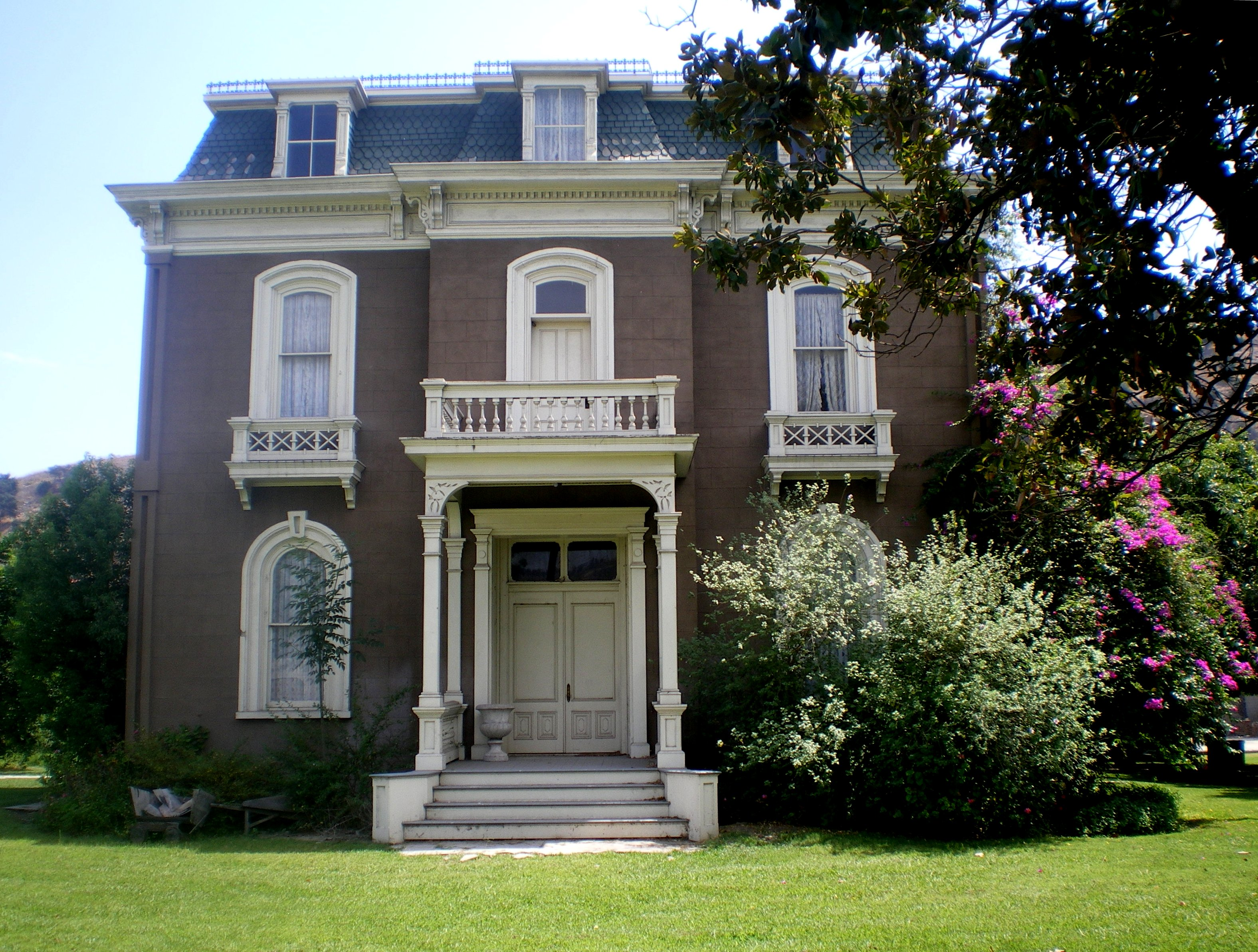
Louis Phillips's 1875 Second Empire-style mansion at the site of the town of Spadra

Phillips sold a parcel of his land to William "Uncle Billy" Rubottom, in 1866 who founded a new town there and named it Spadra after his hometown, now part of Clarksville, Arkansas. The site of Spadra is 3 miles (4.8 km) west of the Pomona Station along Pomona Blvd. just east of the 57 (Orange) Freeway. Spadra became a stagecoach stop, Rubottom built the Spadra Hotel and Tavern to serve travelers, and by 1870, Spadra had 400–500 residents, three stores, a school, and a post office. In 1873, Phillips convinced the Southern Pacific Railroad to build a line to Spadra. Phillips thought Spadra would become a great town, and built his Phillips Mansion there in 1875, which together with the Spadra Cemetery are the only two remnants of the town that still exist today. Fullerton's Main north–south road was named Spadra Road for its first 75 years, as long before the 57 Freeway it was the road through Brea Canyon to Spadra, and was later renamed Harbor Boulevard. The Southern Pacific Railroad had a terminus at Spadra, but the line was extended east to Colton, and Spadra lost momentum. In 1964, the area was annexed by Pomona.

=== 1880–present ===
By the 1880s, the arrival of Coachella Valley water, together with railroad access, made it the western anchor of the citrus-growing region. Pomona was officially incorporated on January 6, 1888.

In the 1920s Pomona was known as the "Queen of the Citrus Belt", with one of the highest per-capita levels of income in the United States. In the 1940s it was used as a movie-previewing location for major motion picture studios to see how their films would play to modally middle-class audiences around the country (for which Pomona was at that time viewed as an idealized example).

Pomona Mall was a downtown pedestrian mall, recognized by the Los Angeles Conservancy as an outstanding example of Mid-century modern and modern architecture and design. It was completed in 1962, one element in a larger plan of civic improvements covering the whole city. The eastern end is now part of the Western University of Health Sciences campus, while the western end now houses numerous art galleries, art studios and restaurants.

In 2005, Pomona citizens elected Norma Torres, the first woman of Guatemalan heritage to be elected to a mayoral post outside of Guatemala. Later, she would become a U.S. congresswoman representing California's 35th congressional district in 2015.

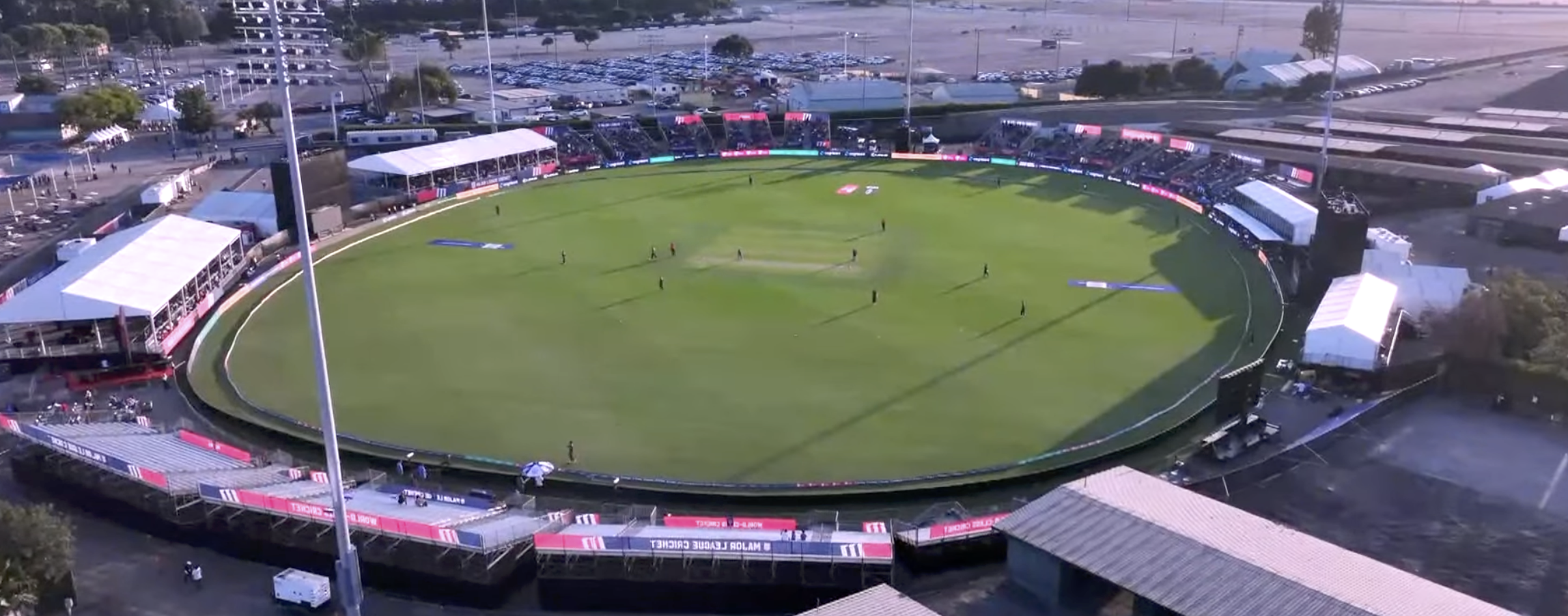
The Knight Riders Cricket Ground after it opened in 2026.

On April 22, 2026, construction began on the Knight Riders Cricket Ground, which became the home of the Los Angeles Knight Riders of Major League Cricket. The stadium opened on July 1, 2026. The stadium will also host the cricket competition at the 2028 Summer Olympics.

== Geography ==
Pomona is 30 miles (48 km) east of Los Angeles in the Pomona Valley, located at 34°3′39″N 117°45′21″W (34.060760, −117.755886). According to the United States Census Bureau, the city has a total area of 22.964 square miles (59.48 km^{2}), over 99% of it land.

Pomona is approximately 30 miles (48 km) east of downtown Los Angeles, 26 miles (42 km) north of Santa Ana, 25 miles (40 km) west of Riverside, and 32 miles (51 km) west of San Bernardino.

Pomona is bordered by the cities of San Dimas on the northwest, La Verne and Claremont on the north, Montclair and Chino on the east, Chino Hills and Diamond Bar on the south, Walnut, South San Jose Hills, and Industry on the southwest, and the unincorporated community of Walnut Islands on the west. The Los Angeles/San Bernardino county line forms most of the city's southern and eastern boundaries.

=== Climate ===
Pomona has a Mediterranean climate (Köppen climate classification Csa) with hot, dry summers and mild, damp winters, and a large amount of sunshine year-round. Summers are characterized by sunny days and very little rainfall during June through September. Fall brings cooler temperatures and occasional showers, as well as seasonal Santa Ana winds originating from the northeast.

Climate data for Pomona, California, 1991–2020 normals, extremes 1949–2017
| Month | Jan | Feb | Mar | Apr | May | Jun | Jul | Aug | Sep | Oct | Nov | Dec | Year |
|---|---|---|---|---|---|---|---|---|---|---|---|---|---|
| Record high °F (°C) | 91 (33) | 94 (34) | 100 (38) | 104 (40) | 106 (41) | 117 (47) | 113 (45) | 110 (43) | 113 (45) | 107 (42) | 97 (36) | 93 (34) | 117 (47) |
| Mean maximum °F (°C) | 82.8 (28.2) | 84.7 (29.3) | 86.2 (30.1) | 92.1 (33.4) | 94.0 (34.4) | 95.3 (35.2) | 100.1 (37.8) | 100.7 (38.2) | 102.9 (39.4) | 96.6 (35.9) | 87.0 (30.6) | 81.0 (27.2) | 105.9 (41.1) |
| Mean daily maximum °F (°C) | 67.9 (19.9) | 67.3 (19.6) | 72.0 (22.2) | 75.8 (24.3) | 78.4 (25.8) | 84.3 (29.1) | 90.3 (32.4) | 92.4 (33.6) | 88.7 (31.5) | 80.5 (26.9) | 73.5 (23.1) | 66.9 (19.4) | 78.2 (25.7) |
| Daily mean °F (°C) | 55.5 (13.1) | 55.9 (13.3) | 59.5 (15.3) | 62.7 (17.1) | 66.2 (19.0) | 70.8 (21.6) | 76.3 (24.6) | 77.5 (25.3) | 74.6 (23.7) | 67.2 (19.6) | 60.2 (15.7) | 54.2 (12.3) | 65.1 (18.4) |
| Mean daily minimum °F (°C) | 43.1 (6.2) | 44.5 (6.9) | 47.0 (8.3) | 49.6 (9.8) | 54.0 (12.2) | 57.2 (14.0) | 62.3 (16.8) | 62.7 (17.1) | 60.4 (15.8) | 53.9 (12.2) | 47.0 (8.3) | 41.5 (5.3) | 51.9 (11.1) |
| Mean minimum °F (°C) | 32.4 (0.2) | 34.3 (1.3) | 36.5 (2.5) | 39.8 (4.3) | 44.9 (7.2) | 48.9 (9.4) | 54.2 (12.3) | 53.2 (11.8) | 51.2 (10.7) | 45.1 (7.3) | 36.6 (2.6) | 31.5 (−0.3) | 29.9 (−1.2) |
| Record low °F (°C) | 21 (−6) | 22 (−6) | 26 (−3) | 29 (−2) | 31 (−1) | 38 (3) | 41 (5) | 42 (6) | 38 (3) | 29 (−2) | 24 (−4) | 22 (−6) | 21 (−6) |
| Average precipitation inches (mm) | 2.91 (74) | 4.15 (105) | 2.12 (54) | 0.97 (25) | 0.22 (5.6) | 0.06 (1.5) | 0.00 (0.00) | 0.03 (0.76) | 0.01 (0.25) | 0.97 (25) | 0.74 (19) | 2.29 (58) | 14.47 (368.11) |
| Average precipitation days (≥ 0.01 in) | 5.3 | 6.3 | 4.1 | 2.1 | 0.9 | 0.4 | 0.2 | 0.1 | 0.3 | 2.8 | 3.3 | 4.9 | 30.7 |
Source 1: NOAA
Source 2: National Weather Service (mean maxima/minima 1981–2010)

== Demographics ==
Historical population
| Census | Pop. | Note | %± |
|---|---|---|---|
| 1890 | 3,634 | | — |
| 1900 | 5,526 | | 52.1% |
| 1910 | 10,207 | | 84.7% |
| 1920 | 13,505 | | 32.3% |
| 1930 | 20,804 | | 54.0% |
| 1940 | 23,539 | | 13.1% |
| 1950 | 35,405 | | 50.4% |
| 1960 | 67,157 | | 89.7% |
| 1970 | 87,384 | | 30.1% |
| 1980 | 92,742 | | 6.1% |
| 1990 | 131,723 | | 42.0% |
| 2000 | 149,473 | | 13.5% |
| 2010 | 149,058 | | −0.3% |
| 2020 | 151,713 | | 1.8% |
U.S. Decennial Census; 1860–1870 1880-1890; 1900 1910 1920; 1930 1940 1950; 1960 1970 1980; 1990 2000 2010; 2020

Pomona first appeared as a city in the 1890 U.S. Census, the first incorporated place in the now defunct San Jose township (pop 1,170 in 1880).

| Historical racial profile | 2010 | 1990 | 1970 | 1950 |
|---|---|---|---|---|
| White | 48.0% | 57.0% | 85.8% | 99.2% |
| —Non-Hispanic | 12.5% | 28.2% | N/A | N/A |
| Black or African American | 7.3% | 14.4% | 12.2% | 0.6% |
| Hispanic or Latino (of any race) | 70.5% | 51.3% | 15.4% | N/A |
| Asian | 8.5% | 6.7% | 0.6% | 0.2% |

Pomona, California – Racial and ethnic composition Note: the US Census treats Hispanic/Latino as an ethnic category. This table excludes Latinos from the racial categories and assigns them to a separate category. Hispanics/Latinos may be of any race.
| Race / Ethnicity (NH = Non-Hispanic) | Pop 1980 | Pop 1990 | Pop 2000 | Pop 2010 | Pop 2020 | % 1980 | % 1990 | % 2000 | % 2010 | % 2020 |
|---|---|---|---|---|---|---|---|---|---|---|
| White alone (NH) | 43,511 | 37,149 | 25,348 | 18,672 | 15,669 | 46.92% | 28.20% | 16.96% | 12.53% | 10.33% |
| Black or African American alone (NH) | 17,198 | 18,007 | 13,834 | 10,107 | 8,116 | 18.54% | 13.67% | 9.26% | 6.78% | 5.35% |
| Native American or Alaska Native alone (NH) | 903 | 460 | 505 | 320 | 386 | 0.97% | 0.35% | 0.34% | 0.21% | 0.25% |
| Asian alone (NH) | 2,247 | 8,287 | 10,518 | 12,303 | 15,853 | 2.42% | 6.29% | 7.04% | 8.25% | 10.45% |
| Native Hawaiian or Pacific Islander alone (NH) | 2,247 | 8,287 | 247 | 240 | 235 | 2.42% | 6.29% | 0.17% | 0.16% | 0.15% |
| Other race alone (NH) | 401 | 287 | 183 | 282 | 697 | 0.43% | 0.22% | 0.12% | 0.19% | 0.46% |
| Mixed race or Multiracial (NH) | x | x | 2,468 | 1,999 | 2,713 | x | x | 1.65% | 1.34% | 1.79% |
| Hispanic or Latino (any race) | 28,302 | 67,533 | 96,370 | 105,135 | 108,044 | 30.52% | 51.27% | 64.47% | 70.53% | 71.22% |
| Total | 92,742 | 131,723 | 149,473 | 149,058 | 151,713 | 100.00% | 100.00% | 100.00% | 100.00% | 100.00% |

=== 2020 ===
The 2020 United States census reported that Pomona had a population of 151,713. The population density was 6,600.5 inhabitants per square mile (2,548.5/km^{2}). The racial makeup of Pomona was 21.0% White, 5.8% African American, 2.3% Native American, 10.7% Asian, 0.2% Pacific Islander, 41.3% from other races, and 18.7% from two or more races. Hispanic or Latino of any race were 71.2% of the population.

The census reported that 97.3% of the population lived in households, 1.6% lived in non-institutionalized group quarters, and 1.0% were institutionalized.

There were 42,050 households, out of which 42.0% included children under the age of 18, 47.3% were married-couple households, 8.1% were cohabiting couple households, 26.9% had a female householder with no partner present, and 17.7% had a male householder with no partner present. 15.8% of households were one person, and 6.0% were one person aged 65 or older. The average household size was 3.51. There were 32,778 families (78.0% of all households).

The age distribution was 23.6% under the age of 18, 12.0% aged 18 to 24, 28.6% aged 25 to 44, 24.2% aged 45 to 64, and 11.7% who were 65 years of age or older. The median age was 34.1 years. For every 100 females, there were 98.3 males.

There were 43,352 housing units at an average density of 1,886.1 units per square mile (728.2 units/km^{2}), of which 42,050 (97.0%) were occupied. Of these, 53.0% were owner-occupied, and 47.0% were occupied by renters.

In 2023, the US Census Bureau estimated that the median household income was $78,869, and the per capita income was $28,131. About 11.5% of families and 14.2% of the population were below the poverty line.

=== 2010 ===
The 2010 United States census reported that Pomona had a population of 149,058, a slight decline from the 2000 census population. The population density was 6,491.2 inhabitants per square mile (2,506.3/km^{2}). The racial makeup of Pomona was 71,564 (48.0%) White (12.5% Non-Hispanic White), 10,924 (7.3%) African American, 1,763 (1.2%) Native American, 12,688 (8.5%) Asian of which is 2,217 (1.48%) Chinese, 2,938 (1.97%) Filipino, 443 (0.3%) Japanese, 633 (0.42%) Korean, 1,643 (1.1%) Vietnamese , 282 (0.2%) Pacific Islander, 45,171 (30.3%) from other races, and 6,666 (4.5%) from two or more races. Hispanic or Latino of any race were 105,135 persons (70.5%).

The Census reported that 144,920 people (97.2% of the population) lived in households, 2,782 (1.9%) lived in non-institutionalized group quarters, and 1,356 (0.9%) were institutionalized.

There were 38,477 households, out of which 19,690 (51.2%) had children under the age of 18 living in them, 19,986 (51.9%) were opposite-sex married couples living together, 6,960 (18.1%) had a female householder with no husband present, 3,313 (8.6%) had a male householder with no wife present. There were 2,823 (7.3%) unmarried opposite-sex partnerships, and 299 (0.8%) same-sex married couples or partnerships. 5,810 households (15.1%) were made up of individuals, and 2,010 (5.2%) had someone living alone who was 65 years of age or older. The average household size was 3.77. There were 30,259 families (78.6% of all households); the average family size was 4.15.

The population was spread out, with 43,853 people (29.4%) under the age of 18, 20,155 people (13.5%) aged 18 to 24, 42,311 people (28.4%) aged 25 to 44, 31,369 people (21.0%) aged 45 to 64, and 11,370 people (7.6%) who were 65 years of age or older. The median age was 29.5 years. For every 100 females age 18 and over, there were 98.4 males.

There were 39,620 housing units at an average density of 1,771.8 per square mile (684.1/km^{2}), of which 21,197 (55.1%) were owner-occupied, and 17,280 (44.9%) were occupied by renters. The homeowner vacancy rate was 2.0%; the rental vacancy rate was 5.9%. 80,968 people (54.3% of the population) lived in owner-occupied housing units and 63,952 people (42.9%) lived in rental housing units.

During 2009–2013, Pomona had a median household income of $49,474, with 21.6% of the population living below the federal poverty line.

=== Ethnic concentrations ===
According to Mapping L.A., Mexican and German were the most common ancestries in 2000. Mexico and El Salvador were the most common foreign places of birth in Pomona.

The most common ancestries in Pomona are German, English, Italian, Irish, and French.

=== Homelessness ===
In 2022, Los Angeles Homeless Services Authority's Greater Los Angeles Homeless Count counted 716 homeless individuals in Pomona.

== Economy ==
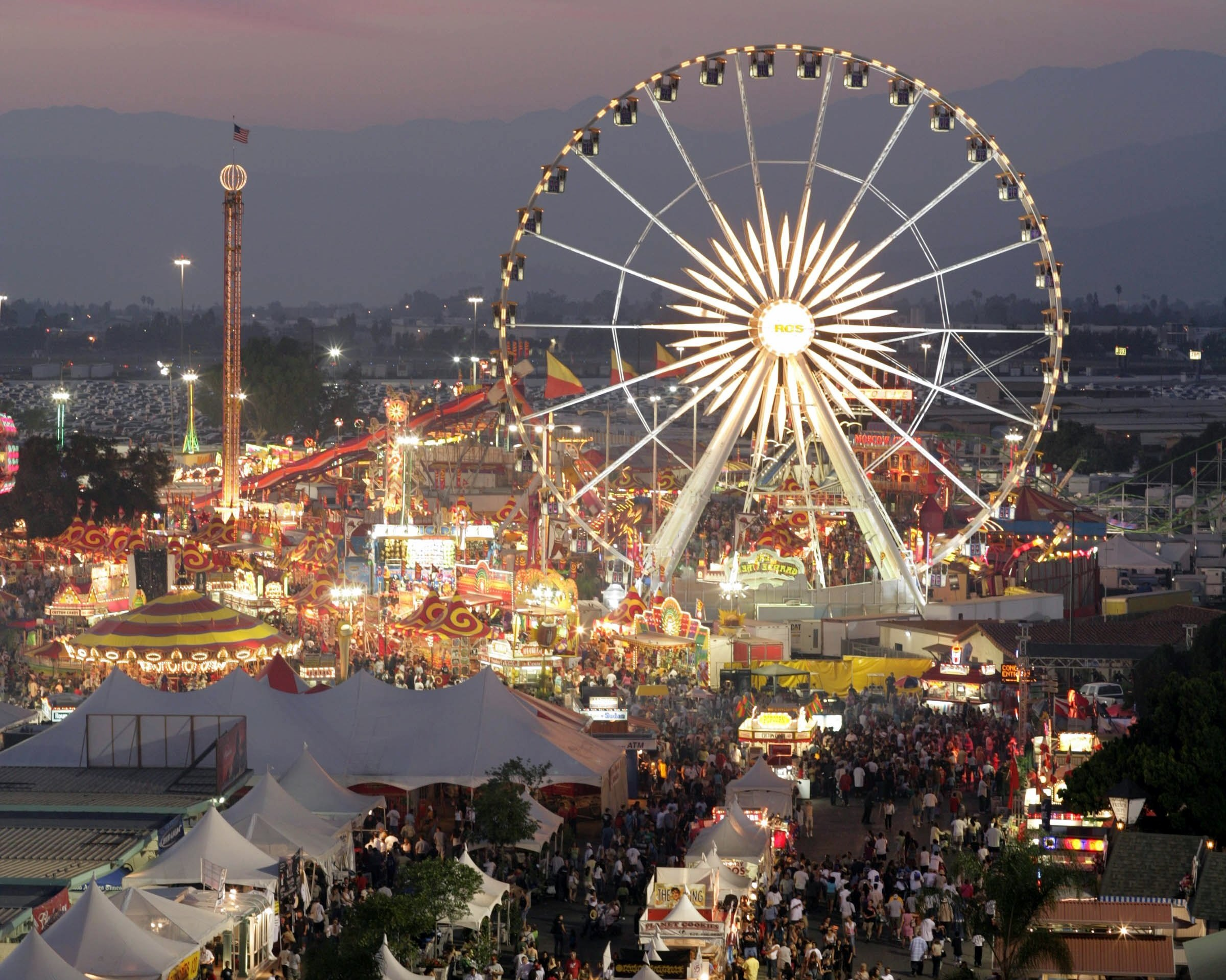
L.A. County Fair

Since the 1980s, Pomona's newest neighborhood Phillips Ranch, experienced rapid growth with homes still being built in the hilly area between Downtown and Diamond Bar. Today, Phillips Ranch is nearly all residential.

According to the city's 2018 Comprehensive Annual Financial Report, the top employers in the city and number of employees are Pomona Valley Hospital Medical Center (3,230), Pomona Unified School District (3,034), California State Polytechnic University, Pomona (2,440), Fairplex (1,071), Casa Colina Rehabilitation Center (1,020), City of Pomona (661), and County of Los Angeles Department of Social Services (350).

== Arts and culture ==
=== Annual cultural events ===
The city is the site of the Fairplex, which hosts the L.A. County Fair and the Pomona Swap Meet & Classic Car Show. The swap meet (for car parts and accessories) is part of the car show, which is a single-day event held seven times throughout the year.

The city is also home to the NHRA In-N-Out Burger Pomona Dragstrip (formerly the Pomona Raceway), which hosts the NHRA Winternationals drag racing competition.

=== Museums and points of interest ===
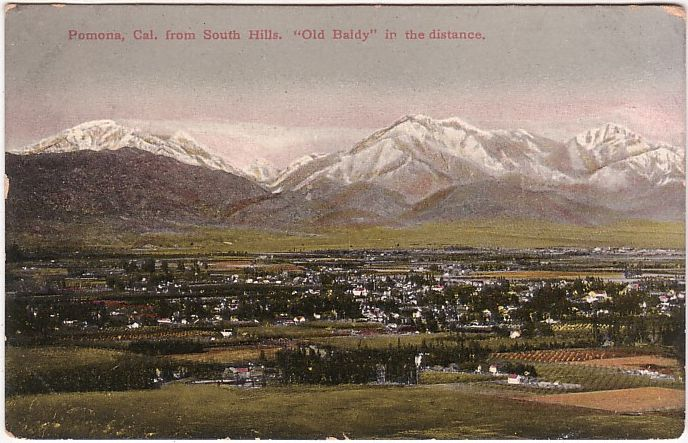
1910 postcard image of Pomona Valley with Mt. Baldy in the distance

- dA Center for the Art
- Fairplex, annual Los Angeles County Fair
- In-N-Out Burger Pomona Dragstrip formerly known as Auto Club Raceway at Pomona (Pomona Raceway)
- YgnaIasa Primera de Rancho San Jose, List of Registered Historic Places in Los Angeles County, California – Pomona
- Pomona Envisions the Future mural in the Arts District of Pomona
- The Glass House
- Pomona Fox Theater
- Phillips Mansion
- Cal Poly Pomona
- American Museum of Ceramic Art
- RailGiants Train Museum
- Pomona Ebell Museum of History
- Spadra Cemetery

=== Architecture ===
The following structures in Pomona are noted by the Los Angeles Conservancy:

- Cal Poly Pomona College of Environmental Design (1971, Carl Maston)
- The Downtown Center / Lytton Savings (1964, Kurt Meyer & Associates)
- Fox Theater Pomona (1931, Balch & Stanbery)
- Pomona Mall (1962, Millard Sheets)
- Pomona Civic Center (1969, Welton Becket & Associates)
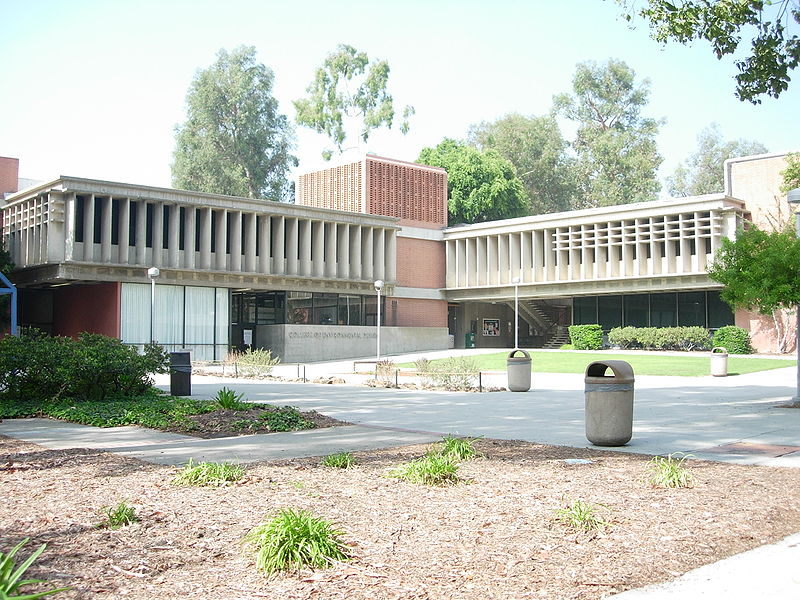
Cal Poly Pomona College of Environmental Design

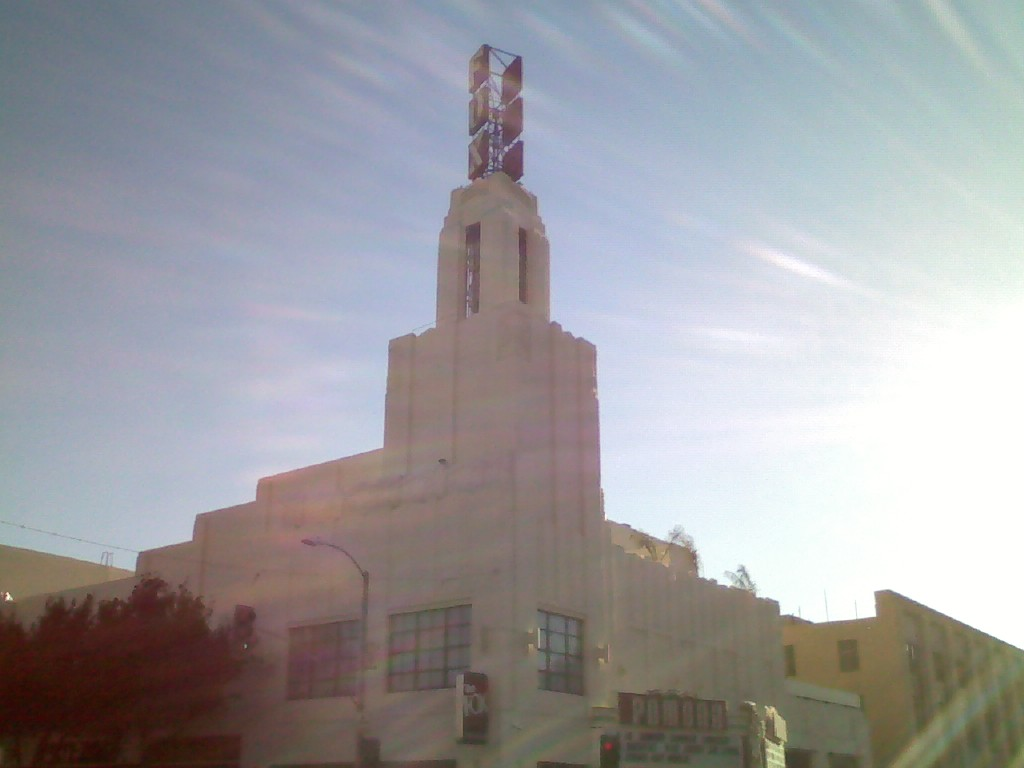
Fox Theater Pomona

== Government ==
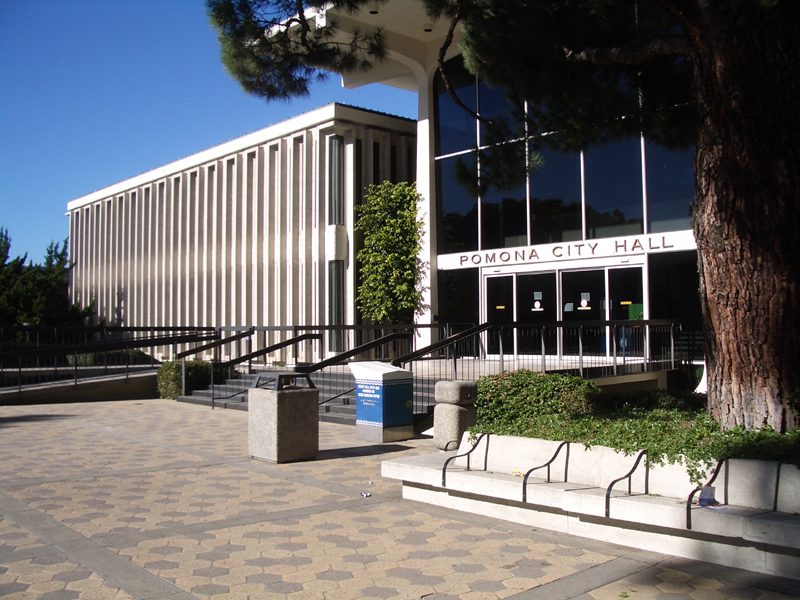
City Hall Pomona, California, 1969

=== Municipal government ===
Pomona was incorporated on January 6, 1888, and adopted a charter in 1911, making it a charter city.

The city is governed by a seven-member city council. Regular municipal elections are held on a Tuesday after the first Monday in November in even-numbered years. Councilmembers serve four-year terms, and the mayor is the presiding councilmember, elected at-large. The other six members are elected by districts. Every eight months, the council appoints a new vice mayor from among its members. The mayor is Tim Sandoval.

=== Financial report ===
According to the city's most recent Comprehensive Annual Financial Report, the city's various funds had $220.3 million in revenues, $225.5 million in expenditures, $818.3 million in total assets, $520 million in total liabilities, and $80.6 million in cash and investments.

=== County representation ===
In the Los Angeles County Board of Supervisors, Pomona is in the 1st District, represented by Democrat Hilda Solis.

The Los Angeles County Department of Health Services operates the Pomona Health Center in Pomona.

The Los Angeles County Fire Department provides fire department services for Pomona on a contract basis.

=== State and federal representation ===
In the California State Legislature, Pomona is in the 22nd senatorial district, represented by Democrat Susan Rubio, and in the 53rd Assembly District by Democrat Michelle Rodriguez.

In the United States House of Representatives, Pomona is in California's 35th congressional district, represented by Democrat Norma Torres.

== Education ==
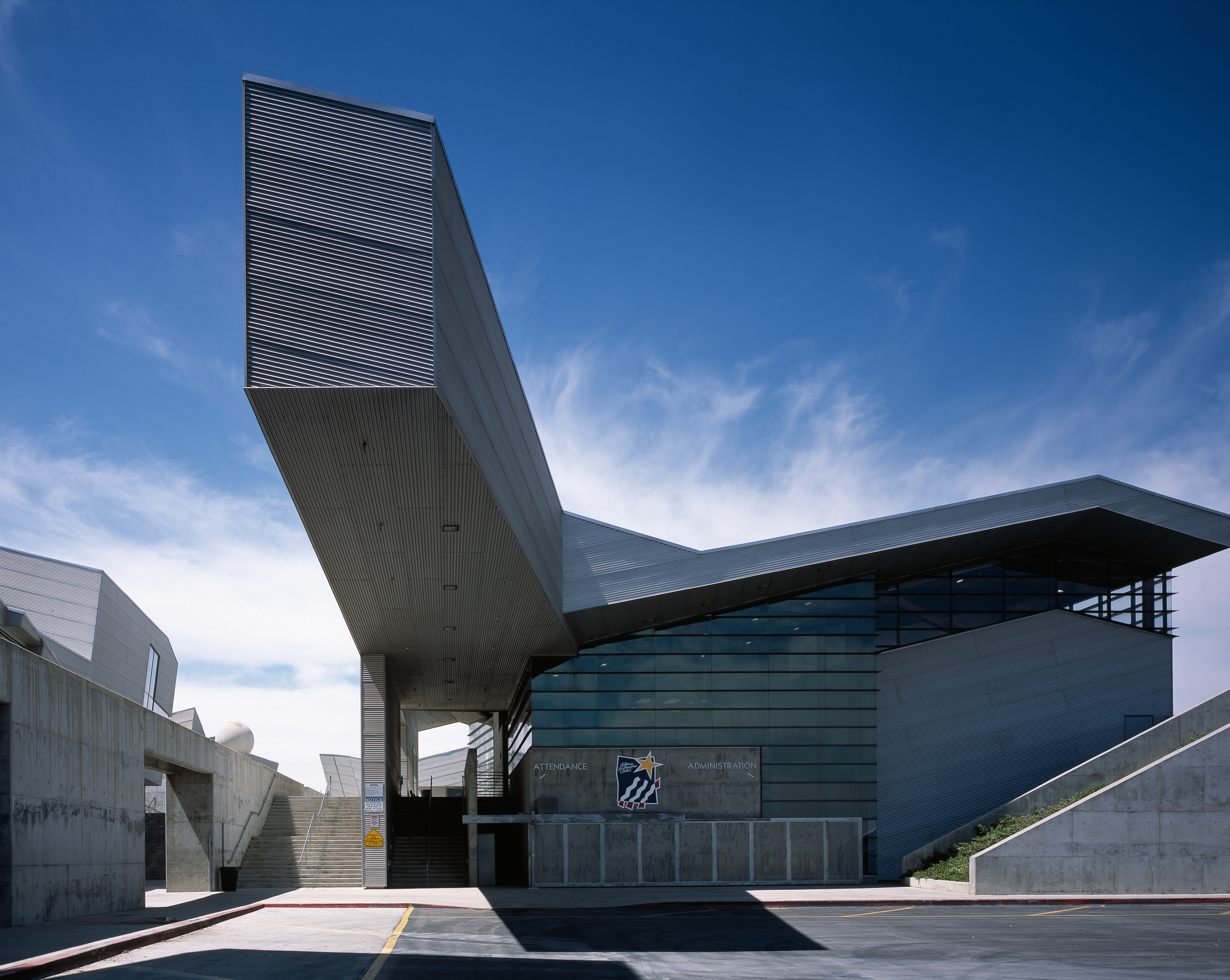
Diamond Ranch High School

=== Public and private schools ===
Most of Pomona and some of the surrounding area are served by the Pomona Unified School District. Pomona High School, Diamond Ranch High School, Ganesha High School, Garey High School, Fremont Academy, Palomares Academy, and Village Academy are PUSD's seven high schools. The Claremont Unified School District serves a small section of northern Pomona. Residents there are zoned to Sumner Elementary School, El Roble Intermediate School, and Claremont High School.

The School of Arts and Enterprise, a charter high school, is also located in the city.

There are four parochial schools of the Roman Catholic Archdiocese of Los Angeles located in Pomona: St. Madeleine Catholic School (K-5), St. Joseph Elementary School (K–5), Pomona Catholic Middle School and High School and St. Christopher-Joseph-Aquinas Academic Academy (2 locations). There are also three Islamic schools: New Dimensions School (K-8), ICC Community School (K-8) and City of Knowledge (K-12).

=== Colleges and universities ===
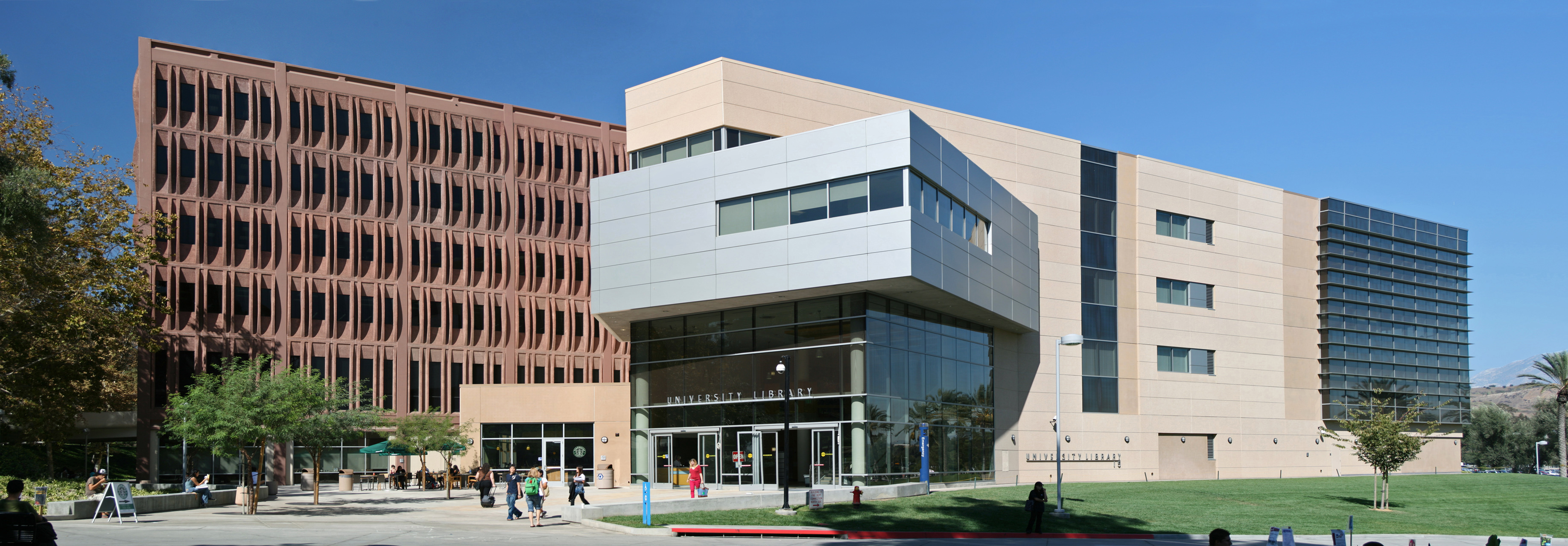
California State Polytechnic University, Pomona library

- California State Polytechnic University, Pomona (Cal Poly Pomona) is located southwest of the junction of the 10 and 57 freeways. The university was established on the site of breakfast cereal magnate W.K. Kellogg's ranch located on the city's western corner. The university has over 24,000 students and covers an area of over 1,437 acres (5.82 km^{2}). The university is known for its agricultural, hospitality, engineering and architectural programs. Some campus areas are also located in Walnut, and the unincorporated community of Ramona.
- Western University of Health Sciences, (formerly known as College of Osteopathic Medicine of the Pacific) is located south of Highway 10 off Towne Avenue. It is one of the largest health sciences universities in California.
- Laguna Technical College is also located in downtown Pomona

== Media ==
The major daily newspaper in the area is Inland Valley Daily Bulletin. La Opinión is the city's major Spanish-language paper. There are also a wide variety of smaller regional newspapers, alternative weeklies and magazines, including:

- Claremont Courier
- San Gabriel Valley Tribune

== Infrastructure ==
=== Rail ===
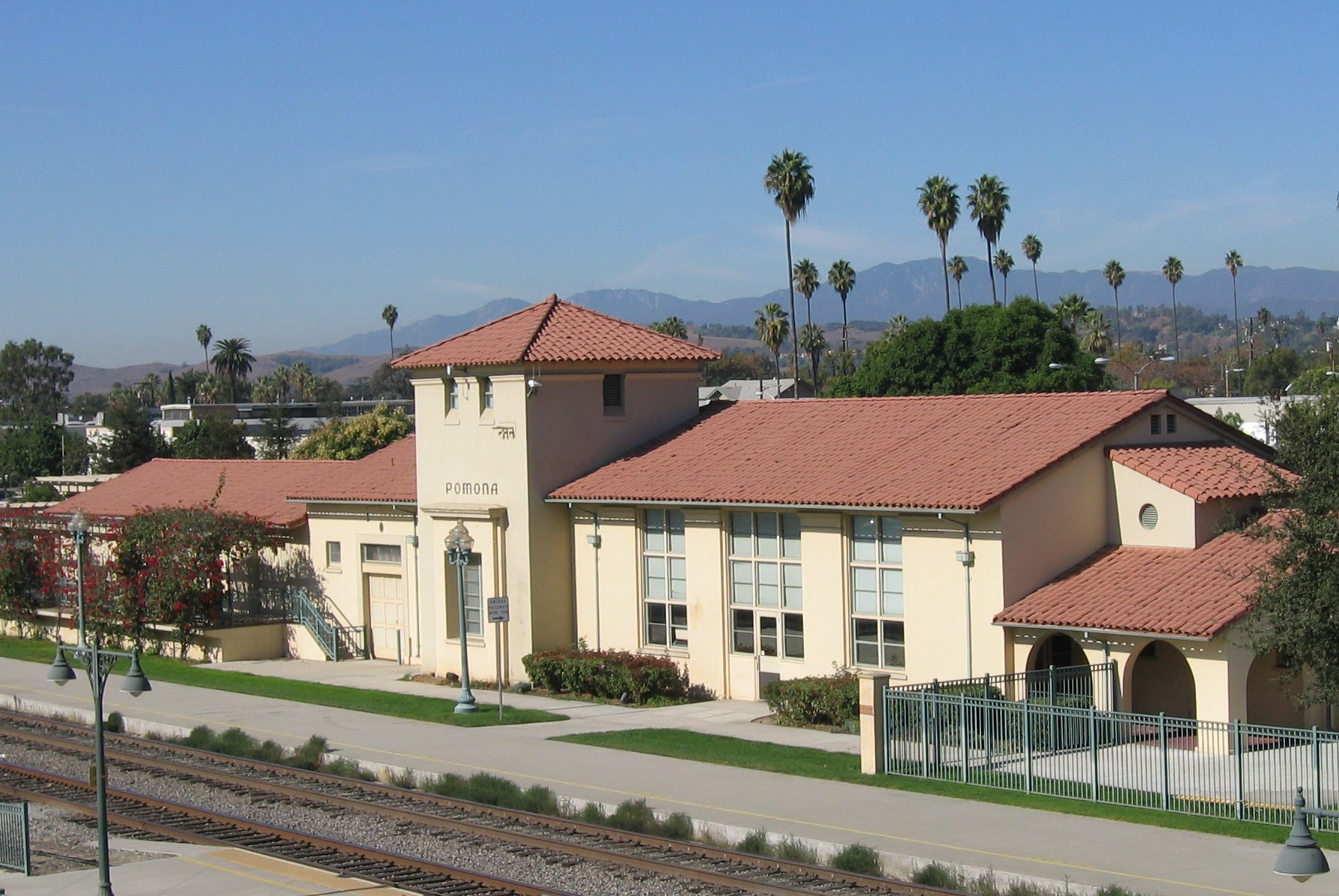
Pomona–Downtown Metrolink station

Pomona is connected to downtown Los Angeles and to downtown Riverside via Metrolink and is connected by Amtrak via the Sunset Limited and the Texas Eagle. Pomona is also connected to Los Angeles and eastern Los Angeles County via light rail, following the completion of Foothill Extension Phase 2B1 on September 19, 2025. The rail line was renamed the A Line when the line was connected with the former Blue Line via the Regional Connector in downtown Los Angeles.

==== Metrolink stations ====
- Riverside Line: Pomona–Downtown
- San Bernardino Line: Pomona–North

=== Freeways and highways ===
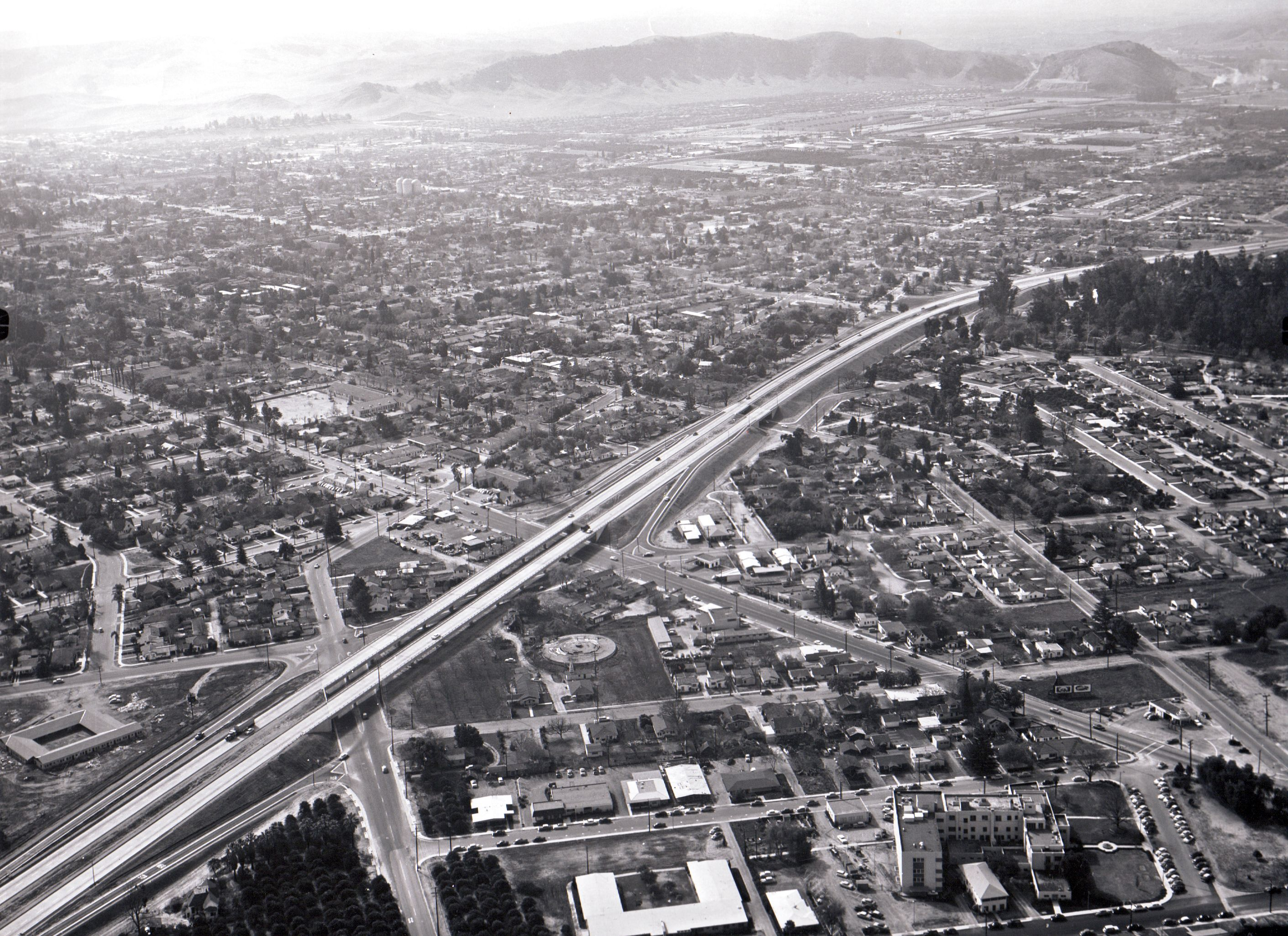
San Bernardino Freeway (I-10) in northern Pomona, 1958

- San Bernardino Freeway
- Orange Freeway
- Pomona Freeway
- Foothill Boulevard
- Chino Valley Freeway

=== Buses ===
Foothill Transit operates bus rapid transit service on the Silver Streak eastbound to the Montclair, and westbound to downtown Los Angeles from the Pomona Transit Center and Cal Poly Pomona (weekdays only). In addition, Foothill Transit operates other lines in the Pomona area connecting communities. Omnitrans bus line 61 runs from the Pomona Transit Center and connects to Ontario Airport, and will be replaced by the sbX Purple Line in 2026.

== Notable people ==
- Above the Law, rap group, formed in Pomona
- Kokane, rapper and singer
- Jessica Alba, actress and entrepreneur, born in Pomona
- Richard Armour, author, grew up in Pomona and attended Pomona College
- Milton L. Banks, basketball player for the Harlem Globetrotters, raised in Pomona
- George Beadle (1903–1989), Nobel-prize winning geneticist, died in Pomona
- Guy Vernon Bennett, politician, was superintendent of schools in Pomona in 1914
- Jeanne Black, country singer, born in Pomona
- Ron Burkle, businessman
- Buckethead, musician, songwriter, and multi-instrumentalist
- Jim Chandler, author, spent time in Pomona during his youth
- Dan Cortes, professional baseball player
- Alberto Davila, boxer
- Gabriel P. Disosway, United States Air Force General
- Michael Efevberha, basketball player for the Nigeria national basketball team
- Ron English, football coach
- Al Ferguson, actor
- Todd Field, actor and film director
- Mike Frank, baseball player
- Suga Free, rapper
- Britney Gallivan, best known for debunking a myth about paper folding
- Ben Harper, singer-songwriter, born in Pomona
- Donnie Hill, professional baseball player
- Bruce Hines, baseball coach
- Jim Keith, author
- Will Keith Kellogg, industrialist
- Jill Kelly, pornographic actress
- Dan McGwire, football player
- Mark McGwire, Major League Baseball player and coach
- Daniel Keys Moran, science fiction author
- Cameron Morrah, football player
- "Sugar" Shane Mosley, professional boxer
- Ed Nelson, actor
- Kem Nunn, author, surfer
- Ryan O'Donohue, voice actor
- Moriah Peters, Christian musician
- Orlando Perez, Major League Soccer player
- Louis Phillips original owner of much of the land that is now Pomona and the one-time richest man in Los Angeles County
- Kenneth Pitzer, chemist, Stanford University president
- Russell K. Pitzer, philanthropist, founder of Pitzer College
- Dave Rice, basketball player and head coach, UNLV
- Frank "Cannonball" Richards, carnival and vaudeville performer, buried at the Pomona Cemetery
- Rio Romeo, singer-songwriter, musician, music producer
- Marie Royce, American diplomat
- Richie Sandoval, boxer
- Bob Seagren, pole vaulter, Olympic gold and silver medalist, started vaulting as a teenager in Pomona
- Millard Sheets, artist and Scripps College professor
- Bill Singer, Major League Baseball pitcher
- Keith Smith, fullback for the Atlanta Falcons
- Noah Song, professional baseball player
- Randy Stein, baseball player
- Brian Stokes, baseball pitcher
- James Tarjan, Chess Grandmaster
- Robert Tarjan, computer scientist, born in Pomona
- Steve Thomas, author, television personality
- Pat Toomay, former football player
- Norma Torres, congresswoman and mayor of Pomona
- Rik Van Nutter, actor
- Jimmy Verdon, football player and coach
- Edward Ulloa, attorney and former prosecutor
- Tom Waits, singer-songwriter, composer, and actor
- Delanie Walker, professional football player
- Frank Wilcox, actor, lived in Pomona in the 1930s and worked in lemon groves
- Rozz Williams, gothic rock musician, born in Pomona
- Larry Wilmore, comedian and comedy writer, host of The Nightly Show
- Trevor Wright, actor
- Rich Yett, professional baseball player, born in Pomona
- The Hughes Brothers, film directors known for Menace II Society, Dead Presidents and The Book of Eli
- Alejandro Aranda, singer and songwriter, runner-up on the seventeenth season of American Idol, born in Pomona.
- Sinqua Walls, basketball player for Cal Poly Pomona
- Ryan Perry, baseball pitcher
- Chris Miller, football coach
- Kaleena Mosqueda-Lewis, basketball player born in Pomona
- Jerry Green, basketball player
- Marty Keough, baseball player
- Dedrique Taylor, basketball head coach
- Jeff Cammon, basketball head coach
- Victor Glover, astronaut

== In popular culture ==
- Author James Ellroy used Pomona as the setting for the fictional amusement park Dream-a-Dreamland in his novel L.A. Confidential.
- In an episode of I Love Lucy, the main characters of the show "go out to the country" on a day trip to Pomona.
- The Fox Theater in Pomona was frequently used by Hollywood during the Golden Age for test screenings. In Billy Wilder's 1950 film Sunset Boulevard, a screenwriter character comments: "They'll love it in Pomona".
- The 1979 Steven Spielberg film 1941 is partly set in Pomona.

== See also ==
- Pomona Valley
- Phillips Ranch
