= Phillips Ranch, Pomona, California =

Neighborhood in Pomona, Los Angeles County, California, United States of America

Coordinates: 34.0361°N 117.7842°W

Phillips Ranch is a master-planned community, first developed by Louis Lesser in 1965. It is located in the southwestern portion of the city limits of Pomona, in Los Angeles County, California. It is located near the Pomona Freeway (SR 60), the Orange Freeway (SR 57), and the Chino Valley Freeway (SR 71). The zip code serving the neighborhood is 91766. Phillips Ranch is 4 miles southwest of downtown Pomona, and is mostly working to upper-middle class in a generally diverse community. Many residents use "Phillips Ranch, CA" as a return address, which is an acceptable alternative to Pomona, CA, according to the United States Postal Service. Phillips Ranch is often referred to by its neighborhood name instead of by the city name.

== History ==
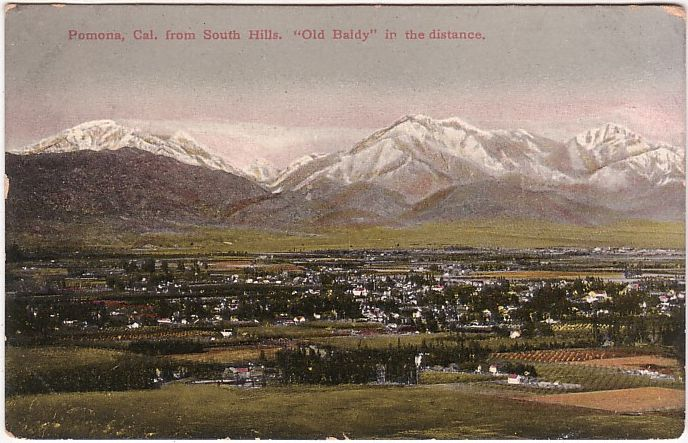
1910 postcard image of Pomona Valley with Mt. Baldy in distance.

Phillips Ranch is located on land which served as part of the ranch of Louis Phillips, who in 1864 acquired the southern end of the 22,340-acre (90.4 km^{2}) Rancho San Jose from two businessmen who had previously bought it from Ricardo Vejar. How much the very private Phillips’s fortune grew in these years is up for debate. In 1892, a reporter for the Pomona Progress interviewed Harris Newmark, who when asked, claimed unequivocally that the unassuming Phillips was the richest man in the county.

In 1964, Louis Lesser Enterprises, Inc. purchased Phillips Ranch, one of the largest parcels of undeveloped land in Los Angeles County, and developed 10,000 housing units. Lesser purchased "the historic Phillips Ranch" southwest of Pomona in 1964, at 2.241 acres (0.907 ha). The sale of 5,000 acres (2,000 ha) of the ranch in 1875 started the City of Pomona. Lesser developed 10,000 housing units in this single project. The land was originally part of a 40,000-acre (16,000 ha) land grant from Mexico, Rancho San Jose, granted to Ricardo Vejar in 1837, who in 1864 sold to Prussian cowboy immigrant Louis Phillips, who came to California in the gold rush. Lesser's brother Alvin was his director of development at the time, and construction started in 1865. After the Civil War, the Southern Trail from the eastern United States, through Yuma, to the California coast passed through the ranch, and the Phillips Ranch Rubottom Hotel became a Saturday night wild west activity center, with fourteen saloons, and three opium dens for large numbers of settlers, businessmen, and others. Churches, schools, and Pomona College ended the lawless element.

=== Louis Phillips Mansion ===
The Phillips Mansion is a Second Empire–style historic house in Pomona, Los Angeles County, California. It was built in 1875 by Louis Phillips, who by the 1890s had become the wealthiest man in Los Angeles County. Situated along the Butterfield Stage route, the Phillips Mansion became a center of community activity in the Pomona and Spadra area. It was added to the National Register of Historic Places in 1974, making it among the first 25 sites in Los Angeles County to be so designated (there are now more than 450).

== Geography ==
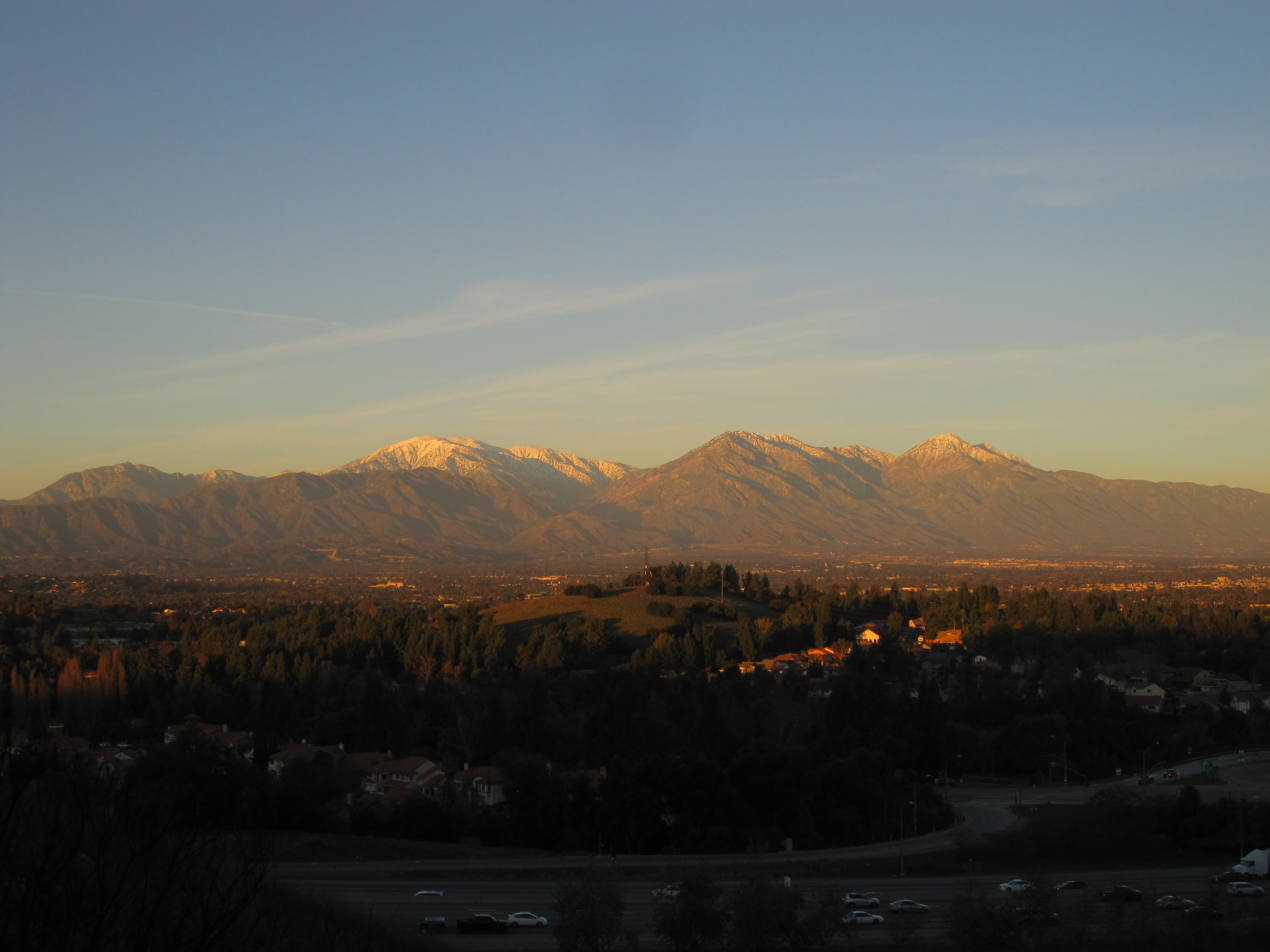
Phillips Ranch, with Mt. San Antonio in the background

Phillips Ranch is bounded by the 71 Freeway to the east, Chino Hills to the south, Diamond Bar to the west, and Mission Blvd to the north-northwest. The elevation of the community is 800 feet above sea level, but it is as high as about 1400 feet, the peak being located at the northwestern part of the neighborhood above Mission Blvd.

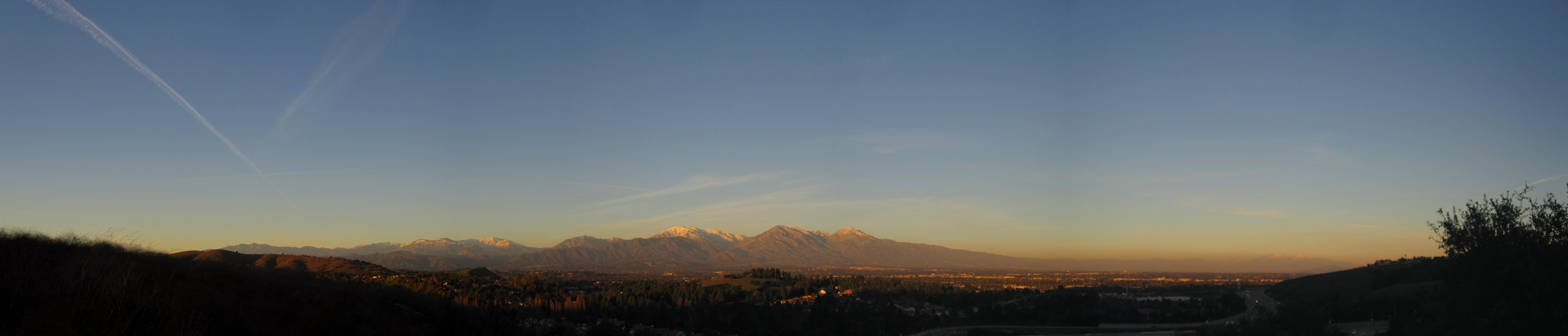
View of Pomona Valley and Phillips Ranch from Diamond Ranch High School

== Education ==
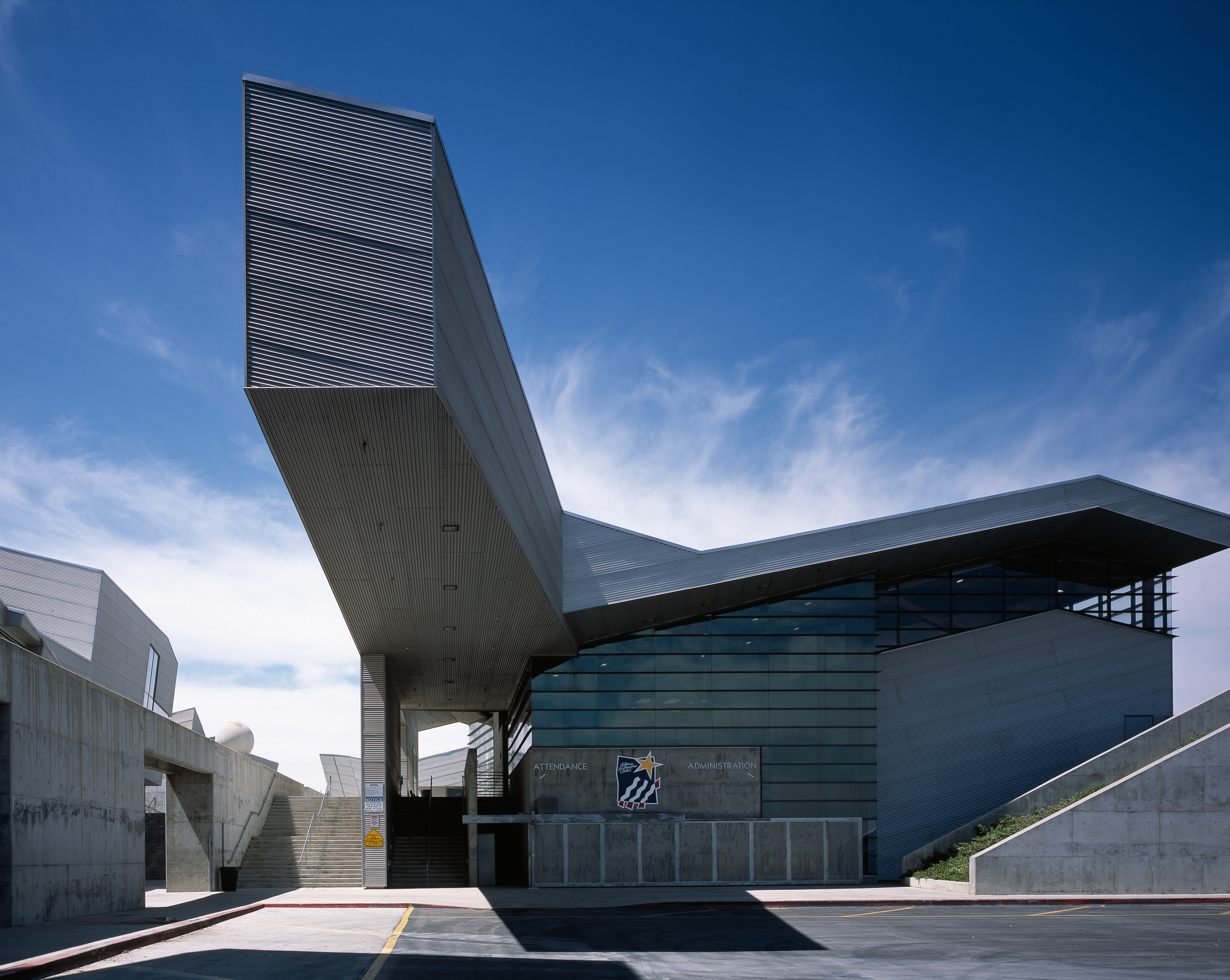
Diamond Ranch High School

Like the remainder of Pomona, Phillips Ranch is served by the Pomona Unified School District, which stretch as far south as parts of Diamond Bar. The community is served by two elementary schools: Decker Elementary School and Ranch Hills Elementary School.

=== Higher education ===
- California State Polytechnic University, Pomona (Cal Poly Pomona), four-year university.
- Mt. San Antonio College, more informally called Mt. SAC, is in nearby Walnut, California.
- Western University of Health

== Main surface thoroughfares in Phillips Ranch ==
- Rio Rancho Road
- Phillips Ranch Road
- Avenida Rancheros
- Village Loop Road
- Old Pomona Road
- Temple Avenue
- Santa Clara Drive
- North Ranch Road
- Mission Boulevard
- Los Felis Drive
- Chino Hills Parkway
