= Abraham Lincoln Elementary School (Pomona, California) =

Public school in California, United States

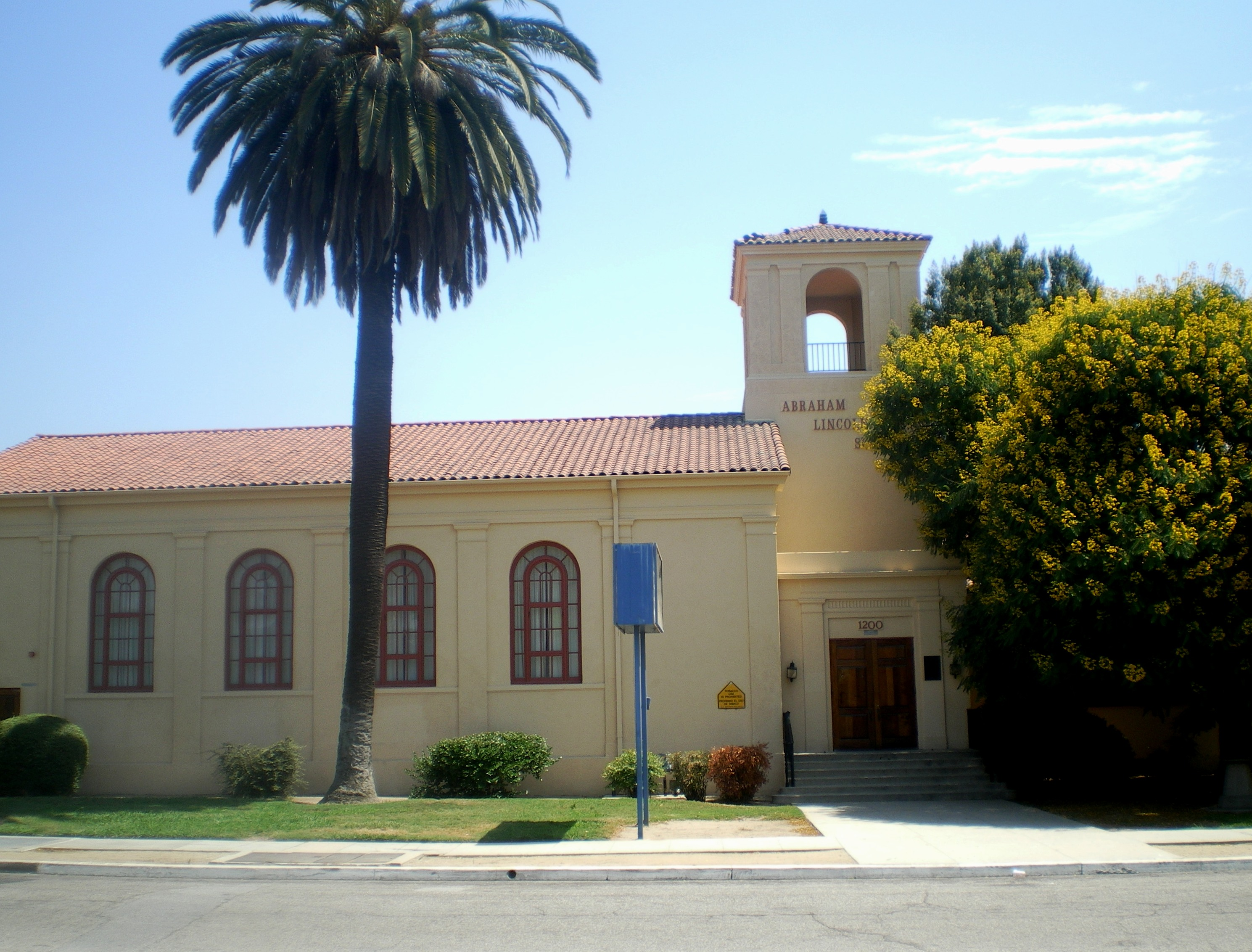

Information
- School district: Pomona Unified School District

Abraham Lincoln Elementary School is a public elementary school in Pomona, California, United Statesa, and a part of the Pomona Unified School District.

It is part of the Lincoln Park Historic District and was listed on the National Register of Historic Places on August 3, 1989 (#89000935).

In 1971, a brothel opened next to the school. As the school's footprint expanded, parents began objecting to the brothel's proximity to the school. By 1994, parents openly protested against the brothel. The police conducted an investigation of the business and by February 2001 a grand jury indicted the owners for prostitution-related charges, which were dismissed as part of a plea deal. By 2002 the brothel was closed and the school district bought the land for Lincoln Elementary.
