= Lincoln Park Historic District (Pomona, California) =

Historic district in California, United States

Coordinates: 34.070525°N 117.745497°W

- U.S. National Register of Historic Places
- U.S. Historic district
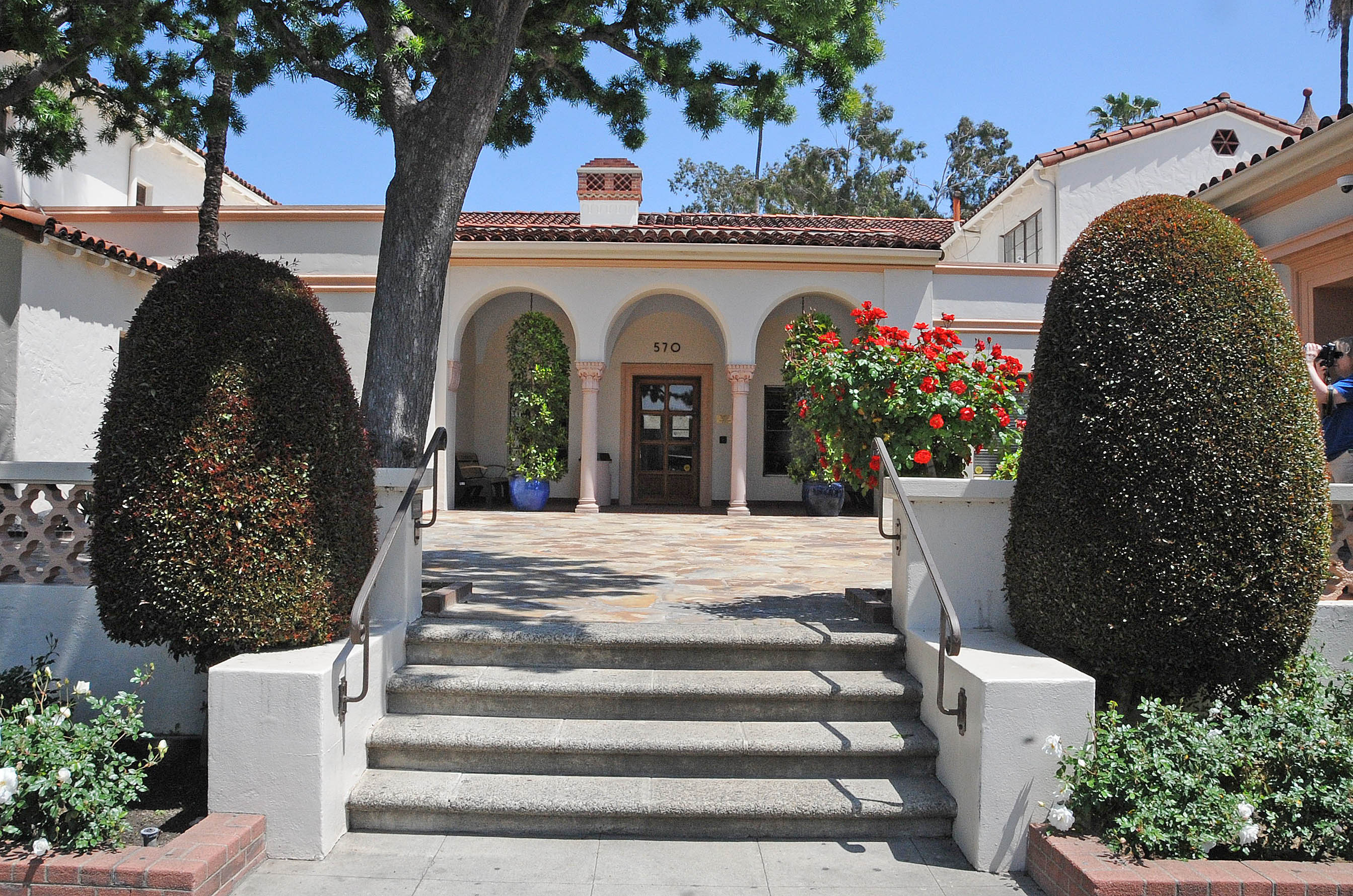
- Todd Memorial Chapel

- Location within the Los Angeles metropolitan area Location within California Location within the United States
- Location: Bordered approximately by McKinley Avenue to the North, Towne Avenue to the East, Pasadena Street to the South and Garey Avenue to the West, Pomona, California
- Area: 230 acres (93 ha)
- Built: 1890s
- Architect: Ferdinand Davis, others
- Architectural style: 19th and 20th Century Revival, Victorian, Craftsman, Spanish/Mediterranean, Tudor
- NRHP reference No.: 03001347
- Added to NRHP: April 9, 2004

The Lincoln Park Historic District in Pomona, California is a 45-block, 230-acre residential neighborhood. The district consists of 821 structures—primarily single family homes built between the 1890s through the 1940s—featuring a wide variety of architectural styles from late Victorian and National Folk homes, Craftsman and Craftsman-influenced homes, as well as late 19th and 20th Century Revival architectural styles including Colonial, Mission/Spanish, Tudor and Classical Revival.

The Lincoln Park Historic District was designated on May 4, 1998, and entered in the National Register of Historic Places on April 9, 2004. The listing included 745 contributing buildings, four contributing objects (all historic hitching posts), and a contributing site (Lincoln Park). It is one of four historic districts in Pomona, California.

== Landmarks ==
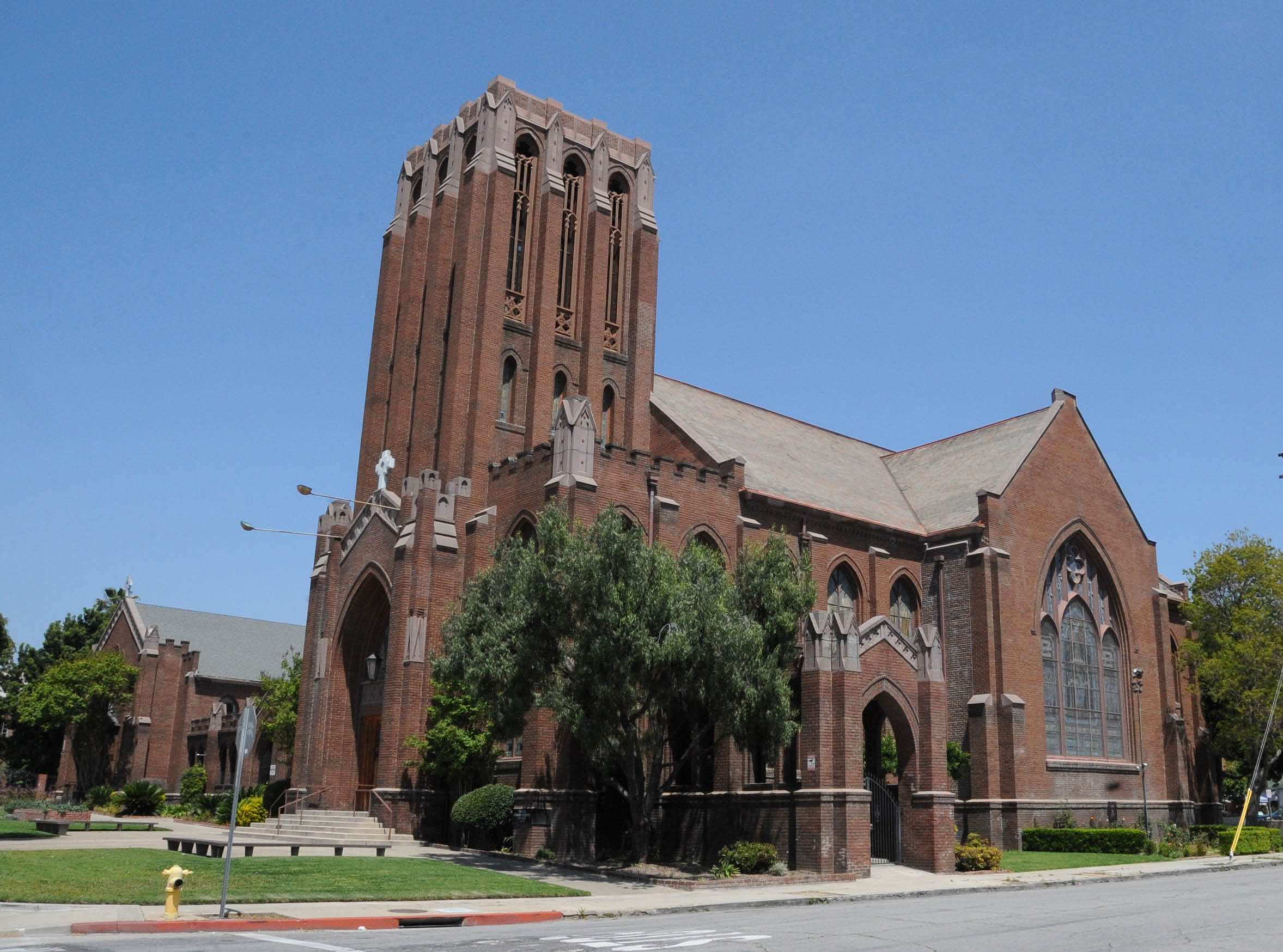
Pilgrim Congregational Church

The Lincoln Park Historic District boundary is roughly rectangular in shape, bordered approximately by McKinley Avenue to the North, Towne Avenue to the East, Pasadena Street to the South and Garey Avenue to the West. The District takes its name from Lincoln Park, a neighborhood park established in 1909.

The district includes privately owned houses and one publicly owned resource, the Lincoln Park itself.

== Description ==
Lincoln Park showcases structures built in many architectural styles. Four older homes have hitching posts for horses out front. The neighborhood also has four historic churches (Pilgrim Congregational Church; United Methodist Church; St. Paul's Episcopal Church; and First Church of Christian, Scientist) and three additional structures (Todd Memorial Chapel; American Legion Hall; and the Old Fire House). A flock of peacocks roams the neighborhood. There is an annual home tour which highlights properties from Lincoln Park and other Pomona historic districts.

== Education ==
The Pomona Unified School District operates area schools. As of 2006 the local schools are Abraham Lincoln Elementary School, Emerson Middle School, and Pomona High School.
