= Susan Krieg =

American artist (born 1952)

- Born: 1952 (age 73–74); Fargo, North Dakota
- Education: California College of Arts and Crafts
- Known for: Mixed media collages, murals
- Notable work: "Archetypes of the Feminine" series, Benediction, Hollywood Walk of Fame Doors Project, and led painters at Pomona Envisions the Future
- Website: www.kriegartstudio.com

Susan Krieg (born 1952) is an American artist known for her mixed-media collage paintings and murals. She created a series, "Archetypes of the Feminine," that consisted of more than 400 mixed media paintings. She has created murals and facilitated the creation of murals, including the Hollywood Walk of Fame Doors Project and Judy Chicago's Pomona Envisions the Future. Her works have been shown on television programs and have been on display at two Trump buildings in Atlantic City.

== Personal life and education ==
Susan Krieg was born and grew up in Fargo, North Dakota. Her interest in art began as young child when she enjoyed coloring books.

Krieg gave birth to a son, Adam, when she was 18 years old. Four years later she attended two semesters at the California College of Arts and Crafts in Oakland, and then worked for a painting contractor where she performed foreman and secretarial duties. Her interests in murals began at this time. Krieg moved to Phoenix where she attended Arizona State University. Interested in psychology, particularly Carl Jung, she switched majors. She received her bachelor's degree from Ottawa University in 1988.

She has lived in Phoenix, Ventura, California, Chicago, Minneapolis, the San Francisco - Oakland, Oregon, and Manhattan.

== Career ==
=== Mixed media works ===
After she obtained her degree, Krieg worked at Phoenix Art Group, a position she obtained when she had been looking for a job in psychology. She created decorative commercial art made by hand painted etching. She had an arrangement that allowed her to create her own work one day a week.

Krieg created a series, "Archetypes of the Feminine," that consisted of more than 400 mixed media paintings using found objects, gold leaf, fabrics, papers and drawing media. It was made in 2007 for the Buenaventura Art Association "Trash to Treasure" project. The objects she found for her works included glass, seashells, beads, wine labels, a mesh onion bag or other items. She created pieces with the intention of evoking feelings, as when a mother held her child, which made them relatable to other women. Krieg said the artwork, influenced by Jungian psychology, was made to explore "the unconscious form where we all relate to the same symbolism. If I express something that is part of my psychology, part of my humanness, and you related to it, that is what I am trying to do." Her work was exhibited at the Ventura Visitors and Convention Bureau's Discovery Annex.

The collage and acrylic painting, Benediction is the jacket cover for Writing in the Feminine in French and English Canada: A Question of Ethics.

=== Murals ===
She led artists for the 2002 Hollywood Walk of Fame Doors Project, in which 40 roll-up security doors on the Hollywood Walk of Fame were painted with celebrity images. Krieg created a mural, Home of the Peach, with acrylics. It depicted the harvest of peaches and a large monarch butterfly among peach trees. It is located on Chandler Boulevard in North Hollywood, California.

A 10-by-16 foot mural, Futurama, was made at the historic North Hollywood Train Depot during the 2001 NoHo Theatre & Arts Festival with the aid of about 16 local artists. It was her vision of what the NoHo Art District's presence would be in the future.

In 2008, she led the painting effort for Pomona Envisions the Future, a project initiated by Judy Chicago.

In 2011 she created a mural at the library of the Orange County High School. It depicts communication among people from pre-historic cave drawings through to use the modern means of communication, including telephones and social media. She worked with about 70 students over 6 or 7 weeks to paint the mural using images chosen by the students.

=== Other ===
Susan Krieg has maintained a studio in Virginia Beach, Virginia. The Krieg Art Studio was founded by her in 1989. Krieg has led workshops on trompe-l'œil in Los Angeles and collage in Montreal.

As of 2008, Trump Plaza (Atlantic City) and the Taj Mahal Casino in Atlantic City had her works on display. Some of her works have been filmed on Time of Your Life, Pacific Blue, and The Young and the Restless television programs.
