= San Jose Creek =

Stream in Los Angeles County, California

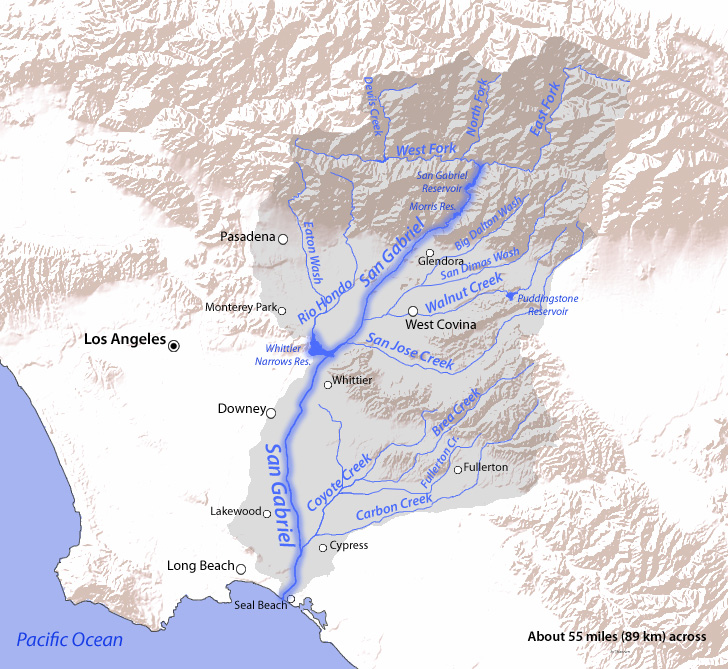
- Map showing San Jose Creek in the San Gabriel River Watershed

- Location of the San Jose Creek confluence with the San Gabriel River

Location
- Country: United States
- State: California
- Region: Los Angeles County
- Municipality: Avocado Heights, California

Physical characteristics
- Source
  - location: Eastern end of the San Jose Hills in Pomona
  - coordinates: 34°04′50″N 117°45′38″W
  - elevation: 960 ft (290 m)
- Mouth
  - location: 3.5 miles (5.6 km) southwest of Bassett, California
  - coordinates: 34°02′18″N 118°01′34″W
  - elevation: 194 ft (59 m)

Basin features
- Tributaries
  - left: South San Jose Creek

San Jose Creek is a southwest-flowing 19.2 miles (30.9 km) intermittent, tributary stream of the San Gabriel River in Los Angeles County, California.

== History ==
From 1829, San Jose Creek was a stopping place on the Old Spanish Trail first used by Antonio Armijo. In 1837, much of its upper reaches were enclosed within the Rancho San José, which became San Jose Township, a historic township in Los Angeles County, and ultimately the cities of Pomona and Walnut. Because of its strategic location between the San Jose Hills and Puente Hills, the Union Pacific Railroad laid tracks along its route connecting Los Angeles with San Bernardino and Salt Lake City.

== Watershed and Course ==
The source of San Jose Creek is at the end of Thompson Wash at the east end of the San Jose Hills near the Los Angeles County Fairplex in northwest Pomona. Thompson Wash originates further north at the southern edge of the San Gabriel Mountains in Claremont. From the end of Thompson Wash, San Jose Creek flows nearly 20 miles (32 km) westwards from Pomona into the San Gabriel River through the Pomona Valley and San Gabriel Valley. San Jose Creek is joined by its 2.5 miles (4.0 km)-long South San Jose Creek tributary about 5 miles (8.0 km) west-southwest of Pomona. The mouth of San Jose Creek is at an elevation of 194 feet (59 meters) at its confluence with the San Gabriel River, 3.5 miles (5.6 km) southwest of Bassett, California.
