= Spadra Cemetery =

Cemetery in California

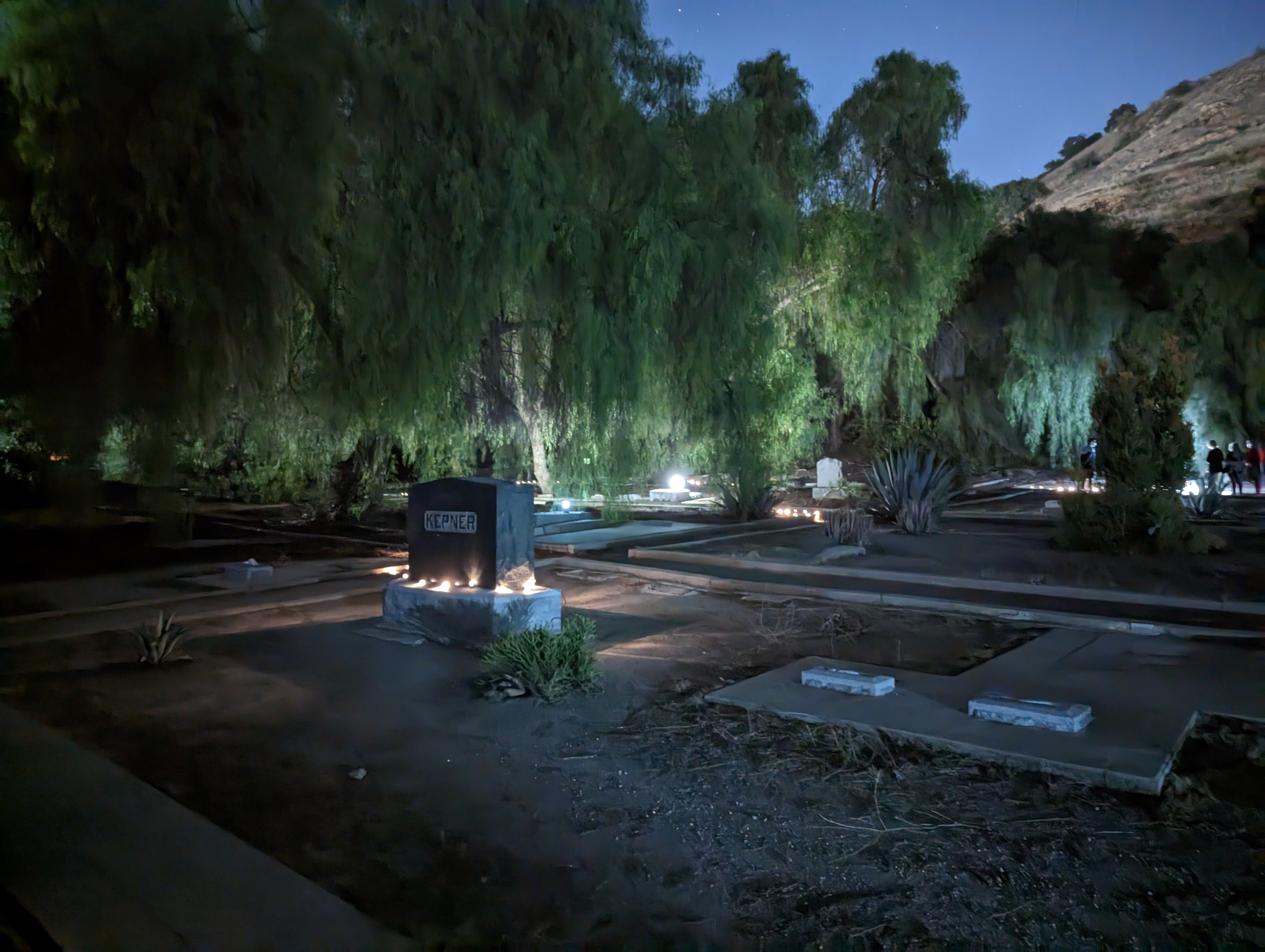
- The cemetery at night in 2022

- Location within the Los Angeles metropolitan area Location within California Location within the United States

Details
- Established: 1868
- Closed: 1971
- Location: 2850 Pomona Blvd, Pomona, CA 91768
- Coordinates: 34.0513°N 117.8008°W
- Type: Historic
- Owned by: Historical Society of Pomona Valley
- Size: 2.5 acres (1.0 ha)
- No. of graves: 212
- Find a Grave: Spadra Cemetery

Spadra Cemetery is a historic 2.5 acres (1.0 ha) cemetery in Pomona, California. Containing 212 graves, it is protected by the Historical Society of Pomona Valley (HSPV), which offers occasional tours, the only time the site is available to the public, as it is locked behind a large gate. It is located underneath SR 57. Many of the site's gravestones are vandalized or deteriorated.

== History ==
One small town that makes up present-day Pomona was Spadra. In 1868, Melinda Arnett, one of the residents, died. She was unable to be buried in one of the nearby cemeteries as they were all Catholic and she was not. To solve this, Louis Phillips, a wealthy landowner in the area, set aside some land on his property for use as a cemetery. Phillips and his wife, Esther, were later buried in the cemetery. In 1897, the Phillipses sold the cemetery to the Spadra Cemetery Association for $1 as Louis Phillips could no longer care for it. Spadra slowly declined afterward, and the last burial at the site occurred in 1971. In 1975, the cemetery was sold to the Historical Society of Pomona Valley. Vandals occasionally stole headstones and damaged the property when it was abandoned.

== Notable interments ==
- Louis Phillips (1830–1900), rancher
