= Pomona Envisioning the Future =

- Location: Pomona, California
- Website: Envisioning the Future

Pomona Envisioning the Future is a collaborative art project which took place in September 2003 in Pomona, California. The project began with began with an idea by Cheryl Bookout, director of SCA Gallery of Pomona. She brought in Judy Chicago, who executed the project with Donald Woodman and Cal Poly Pomona. Seventy artists, trained by nine facilitators, created more than 800 works of art in digital media, photography, sculptures, and painting.

== Project ==
The community-based project named Envisioning the Future (E.T.F.) began with an idea by Cheryl Bookout, (Note: It is stated by the Visual Art Source that the project began with Kevin Stewart-MaGee and Cheryl Bookout, but, information from Cal Poly Tech, Pomona and an in-depth article from the Los Angeles Times shows that the idea began with Bookout, who then met Chicago, and explored the concept further with her over time.) director of SCA Gallery of Pomona. She met with Judy Chicago in 2001 to discuss her goal to bring attention to Inland Valley arts, and revitalize downtown Pomona and its art colony. Executed by Chicago, Donald Woodman, and Cal Poly Pomona, it was Chicago's largest project to that point, including artists from 47 communities within eight counties in California. The project was led by Bookout and Barbara Way, Dean of California State Polytechnic University, Pomona.

This project brings together works that are both diverse and divergent. The future as seen by these artists ranges from optimism to severe pessimism and from the micro level of the family unit to the macro level of the world at large.

—Nelson Trombley, curator of Pitzer's Nichols Gallery and facilitator of the documentary photography group

It began with panel discussions and lectures about "the impact of globalization and new technologies on art and the future", which occurred over two weeks in September 2003 at Western University of Health Sciences in Pomona. Speakers included British art historian Edward Lucie-Smith; Henry Hopkins, formerly of San Francisco Museum of Modern Art and former director of the University of California, Los Angeles (UCLA) Hammer Museum; and other North American art historians, scholars, and artists. Other participants included Judy Baca and Gilbert Luján, muralists from Los Angeles, and artists Patrick Nagatani and Isis Rodriguez. It was then officially kicked off on September 22, 2003.

Woodman and Chicago trained nine facilitators from California's art communities who worked with 70 participants from Southern California to develop the concept for Pomona's future. More than 800 works of art were created over a three month period, including those made in digital media, sculpture, painting, installation and performing arts.

Few viewers will be able to see all of the work. No doubt fewer still will like all of the work they see. But surely, the longterm and widespread benefit/outcome of Envisioning the Future derives from the application of the Participatory Art Pedagogy to the challenge of future imagining--that is to say, from practicing interaction and collaboration. Its aesthetic merit stems from the cumulative effect of the rich diversity of art, rather than from any individual piece, be it masterpiece or disposable.

—Betty Brown, Judy Chicago's 'Envisioning the Future'

Susan Krieg was the painting facilitator. Some of the paintings include Marsha Shaw's Joy of Cloning, and paintings that reflect Deane Swick's views about potential outcomes of conflict within the Middle East and Victoria Delgadillo's viewpoint about worker exploitation. The photography group's submissions included works by Bob Markovich and Nelson Trombley. Pamela Madsen composed "Electro-Acoustic Interactive Opera/Installation for Voices, Percussion and Electronics" for the performance, We Are All Sibyls. It is about Sibyl, "a woman endowed with the power of prophecy in Greek mythology and therefore a natural symbol for the challenges of imagining the future." A mural was designed by one team featuring the Goddess Pomona.

Works of art were shown first at Pitzer College's Nichols Gallery, with a webcast with Chicago. They were then displayed in galleries in Claremont and the Pomona Arts Colony, as well as on the Cal Poly Pomona campus in early 2004. The former gallery director at California State University, Dextra Frankel, directed the "sprawling exhibition design". In 1967, Frankel was curator of Chicago's first major exhibition.

== Mural ==
The 140-by-42-foot (43 m × 13 m) mural Envisioning the Future depicts the past, present, and future of the City of Pomona and features the Goddess Pomona. after which the City of Pomona is named. It is located at Thomas Plaza in downtown Pomona's Arts District Eight muralists, along with artists and students, were connected with the mural's design. The mural artists were lead artist Kevin Stewart-Magee, with Amy Runyen, Chris Toovey, Karen Keller, Cori Griffin-Ruiz, Sandra Gallegos, Rupert Hernandez, Lief Frederick, Lynne Kumra, Mary Kay Wilson, and Yolanda Londono. It was painted by 80 artists and participants, and is located on the side of the Union Building, 195 West Second Street, Pomona.
