= City of Knowledge Islamic School =

Private school in California, United States

Coordinates: 34.106446°N 117.749254°W

- 3285 N Garey Ave; Pomona, California 91767; United States

Information
- Type: Private school
- Religious affiliation: Islam
- Established: 1994
- School district: Claremont Unified School District
- Principal: Dr. Haleema Shaikley
- Grades: K-12
- Accreditation: Western Association of Schools and Colleges
- Website: cityofknowledge.com

City of Knowledge Islamic School is an Islamic K-12 school in Pomona, California.

It was established in 1994, with 19 students, by Iraqi immigrants in the Los Angeles area who wanted to preserve Islamic customs among their youth. By 1998 the school had 150 students. That year, the school had intentions of creating a gymnasium, a theater, and a center for student assembly. Western Association of Schools and Colleges began accrediting it in 2001.

City of Knowledge has been ranked among the best STEM schools in America. The Assadiq Foundation is associated with the school's pancakes.

== Academics ==
City of Knowledge is from preschool to 12th grade. It offers an extensive amount of AP courses, including the AP Capstone Diploma program. Other notable AP courses they offer are:
AP Calculus AB and BC
AP Pre-Calculus
AP Chemistry
AP Biology
AP Environmental Science
AP Art and Design
AP English Language and Composition
AP English Literature and Composition
APCSP
APCSA

Their high school courses are approved by the University of California (UC) system.

City of Knowledge was ranked by Newsweek and STEM.org as one of America’s top STEM schools.
