= Louis Phillips (rancher) =

American businessman

Louis Phillips (April 22, 1830 – March 16, 1900) was a wealthy land owner and rancher in Los Angeles County, California..

== Biography ==
Phillips was born Louis Galefsky to a Jewish family in Kempen, Province of Posen, Prussia (now Kępno, Poland) and moved to California in the early 1850s, changing his name to Phillips. He moved to Spadra (now part of Pomona) in 1862 and began engaging in sheep herding and cattle raising. In 1864, Schlesinger and Tischler acquired the Rancho San Jose in a foreclosure. Phillips, who had previously been a manager on the ranch, bought 12,000 acres (49 km^{2}) out of the foreclosure.

In January 1874, the Southern Pacific Railroad completed a rail line from Los Angeles to Spadra, spurring interest in land development in the area. In 1875, Phillips built the Phillips Mansion (now operated by the Historical Society of Pomona Valley) and also sold most of his 12,000 acres (49 km^{2}) for subdivision into the Pomona Tract, thus beginning the formation of Pomona. Phillips retained 2,241 acres (9.07 km^{2}) surrounding his mansion, which he operated as a cattle and sheep ranch.

In 1867, Phillips married Esther Blake, with whom he had three sons (Charles, George and Louis, Jr.) and two daughters (Mrs. Frank George and adopted daughter, Kate Cecil). He also acquired large land holdings in other parts of the county, including the Los Angeles business district where he owned the Phillips Block on Spring Street, a block on Los Angeles Street and another on Third Street. By 1892, the Los Angeles Times reported that Phillips, "who lives so quietly out at Spadra, near Pomona," was "the richest man in Los Angeles County." The Times noted that Phillips was worth "not a dollar less than $3,000,000" and stated that, in addition to his land holdings in Los Angeles, he had a ranch that produced wool, honey and wheat.

He died of pneumonia in 1900 and is interred at Spadra Cemetery, Pomona.

== See also ==
- Phillips Block
- Phillips Mansion
- Phillips Ranch
