= Elephant Hill (California) =

Mountain in California, United States of America

Coordinates: 34°03′05″N 117°47′48″W

Elephant Hill is a hill, the northernmost summit in the Puente Hills of Los Angeles County, California, United States. It rises to an elevation of 1,145 feet / 349 meters.
