= Phillips Mansion =

Historic house in California, United States

- U.S. National Register of Historic Places
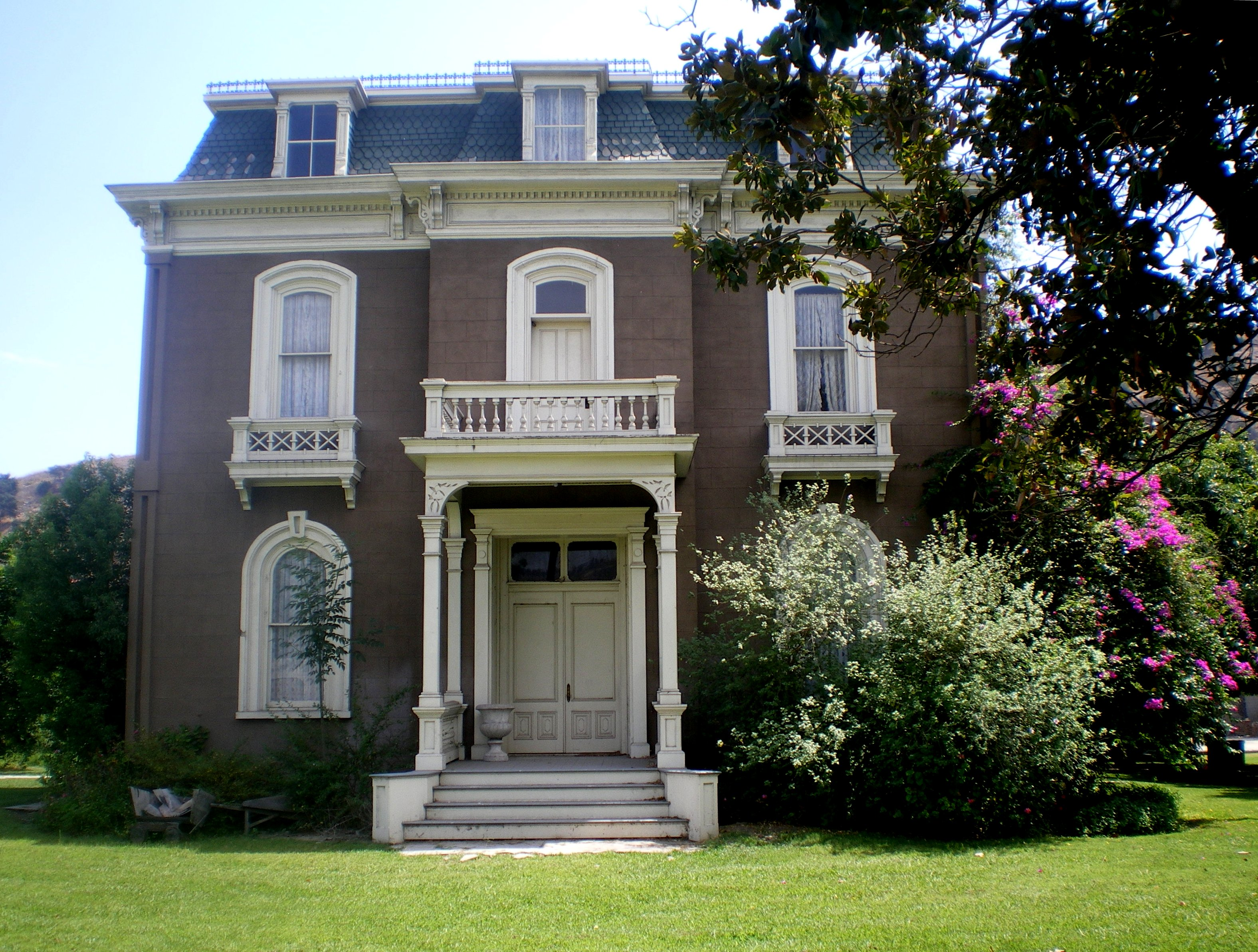
- Phillips Mansion, August 2008

- Location within the Los Angeles metropolitan area Location within California Location within the United States
- Location: 2640 W. Pomona Blvd., Pomona, California
- Coordinates: 34°3′22″N 117°47′44″W
- Built: 1875
- Architectural style: Second Empire
- NRHP reference No.: 74000525
- Added to NRHP: November 6, 1974

The Phillips Mansion is a Second Empire style historic house in Pomona, Los Angeles County, California. It was built in 1875 by Louis Phillips, who by the 1890s had become the wealthiest man in Los Angeles County. Situated along the Butterfield Stage route, the Phillips Mansion became a center of community activity in the Pomona and Spadra area. It was added to the National Register of Historic Places in 1974, making it among the first 25 sites in Los Angeles County to be so designated (there are now more than 450).

== Louis Phillips ==
The Phillips Mansion was built in 1875 by Louis Phillips (c. 1830 - 1900). Phillips was born Louis Galefsky to a Jewish family in Prussia (now Kempen, Poland) and moved to California in the early 1850s, changing his name to Phillips. He moved to Spadra (now part of Pomona) in 1862 and began engaging in sheep herding and cattle raising. In 1864, he purchased 12,000 acres (49 km^{2}) of the old Rancho San Jose for $30,000. In 1867, he married Esther Blake, with whom he had three sons (Charles, George and Louis Jr.) and two daughters (Mrs. Frank George and adopted daughter, Kate Cecil). He also acquired large land holdings in other parts of the county, including the Los Angeles business district where he owned the Phillips Block on Spring Street, a block on Los Angeles Street and another on Third Street. By 1892, the Los Angeles Times reported that Phillips, "who lives so quietly out at Spadra, near Pomona," was "the richest man in Los Angeles County." The Times noted that Phillips was worth "not a dollar less than $3,000,000" and stated that, in addition to his land holdings in Los Angeles, he had a ranch that produced wool, honey and wheat.

== Architecture of the house ==
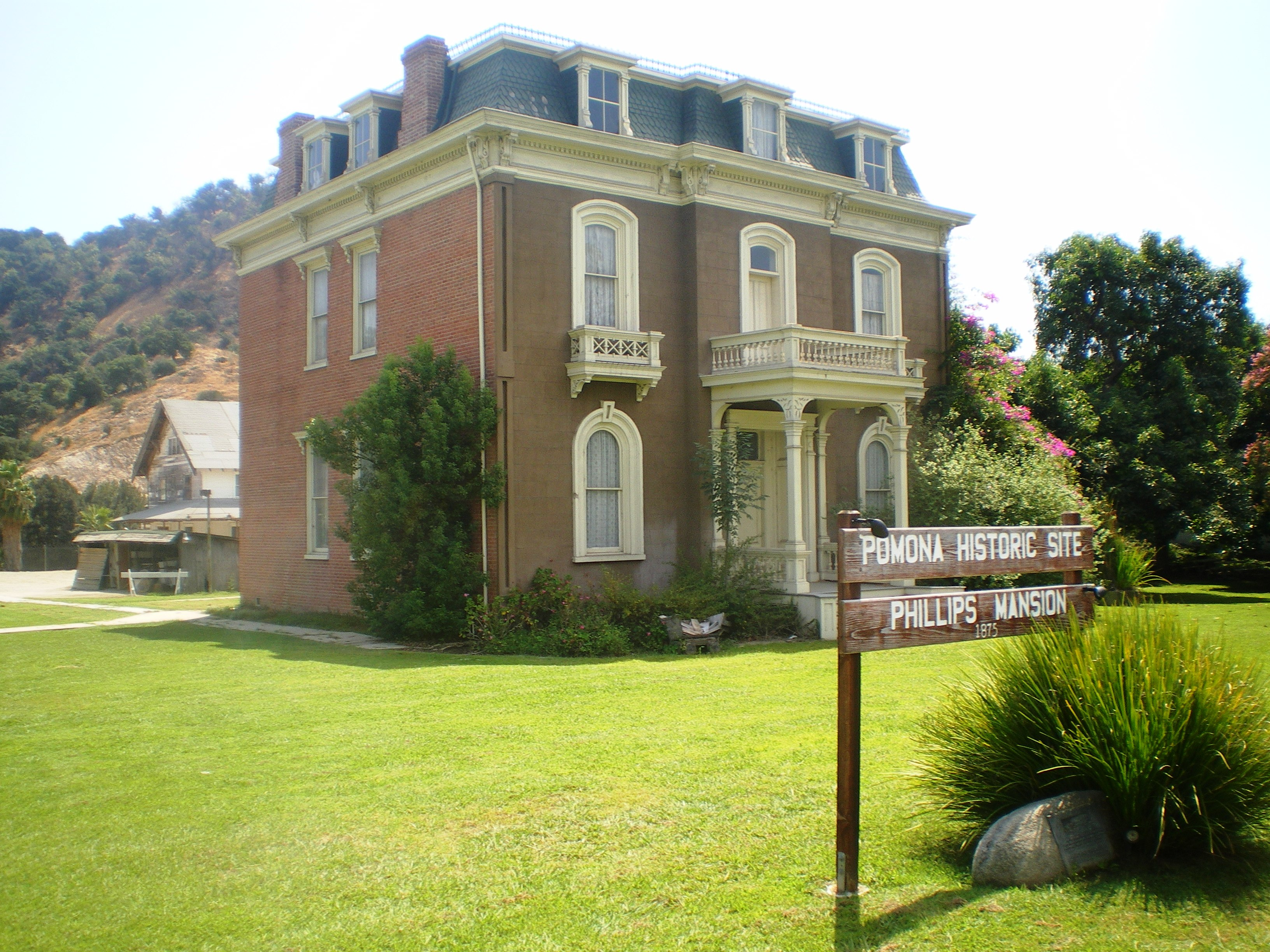
Phillips Mansion and grounds. Currier House in background

The Phillips Mansion was built in 1875 at a cost of over $20,000. It has been described as having been built in the "Second Empire" or "Classic Haunted Mansion architectural style." It was built with 16-foot (4.9 m) ceilings and six fireplaces. The bricks were made at the site by Joseph Mullally of Los Angeles. With its use of a mansard roof, some have described it as being "in the style of the New Orleans French homes." Another writer noted that it "looks as if it had been lifted bodily from the tree-lined street of a midwestern county seat," the "kind of house the banker of such a town would build for himself." The interior of the mansion is finished in cherry and maple wood that was hauled by horse and wagon from San Pedro. The mansion represented a number of firsts in the Pomona Valley, including the following:

- The first home built with fired bricks;
- The first home fitted with gas lighting; and
- The first example of mansard roof architecture.

Other than two Mexican-era adobe structures (the Ygnacio Palomares Adobe and the La Casa Primera de Rancho San Jose), the Phillips Mansion is also the oldest surviving house in the Pomona Valley. It has been named "one of the ten most stately mansions in Southern California."

== History ==
=== Rancho San Jose ===
The property on which the Phillips Mansion was built is part of the 22,000 acre Rancho San Jose land grant awarded in 1837 by Gov. Juan B. Alvarado to Ricardo Vejar and Ygnacio Palomares. The Phillips Mansion was preceded by an adobe built in the 1860s, when the property was still part of the Rancho San Jose. Even before the construction of the Phillips Mansion, it was said that "the cluster of buildings by San Jose Creek at the foot of the Spadra Hills" was the center of life on the rancho.

=== Use by Louis Phillips ===
In 1864, Schlesinger and Tischler acquired the ranch in a foreclosure, and Phillips, who had previously been a manager on the ranch, bought 12,000 acres (49 km^{2}) out of the foreclosure for $30,000. In January 1874, the Southern Pacific Railroad completed a rail line from Los Angeles to Spadra, spurring interest in land development in the area. In 1875, Phillips built the mansion and also sold most of his 12,000 acres (49 km^{2}) for subdivision into the Pomona Tract, thus beginning the formation of Pomona. Phillips was one of the local land promoters (along with Garey, Holt and Towne) who laid out the town of Pomona in the summer of 1875. The new community was named after the goddess of fruit trees. However, Phillips preferred Spadra to Pomona, and retained 2,241 acres (9.07 km^{2}) surrounding his mansion, which he operated as a cattle and sheep ranch.

It has been said that the Phillips Mansion "heralded the Yankee period" in the Pomona Valley. The mansion was a stage stop located where the Butterfield Stage Route intersected with the San Bernardino-Los Angeles Stage Road. Phillips also became postmaster for the Spadra area, and the mansion became both the post office and a center of social activities for the scattered settlers of the Pomona Valley in the late 19th century.

=== Changes in ownership ===
Phillips died from pneumonia at the mansion in 1900. His widow Esther lived at the mansion until 1916, and it remained in the Phillips family until 1931, when their grandson, Cecil George, sold it to Paul T. Boyle of Los Angeles. At that time, the property consisted of the house and 40 acres (160,000 m^{2}) with 4,000 feet (1,200 m) of frontage on Pomona Boulevard. George, who then lived in Hollywood, retained 200 acres (0.81 km^{2}) of walnut groves.

In 1942 the house was sold to C.H. Brandmyer, of Glendale, California. At that time, the property consisted of the house and 21 acres (85,000 m^{2}) of citrus, and the Los Angeles Times reported that the home had never been remodeled.

During World War II, the house was converted into an apartment house. At one time, the house was cut up like a rooming house into four apartments, and the dark interior woodwork was painted over. By 1959, ownership of the property had passed to Earl Isbil.

=== Acquisition and operation by Historical Society ===
During the 1960s, the area surrounding the Phillips Mansion had become largely industrial. In 1966, the mansion was heavily vandalized, and plans were announced to sell the property to a buyer who intended to build a paint factory on the site. At that time, the Historical Society of Pomona Valley, led by Fred W. Sharp, began a campaign to save the old mansion. The Historical Society ultimately purchased the mansion and restored it as a Yankee period museum to complement the Ygnacio Palomares Adobe, which was operated by the Historical Society as a museum focusing on the Mexican period. Pomona architect Amos W. Randall was in charge of the renovation master plan, and the restored mansion was opened for its first public viewings in 1978. Title to the mansion was later transferred to the City of Pomona, and the city and Historical Society now operate the mansion jointly.

In 1973, the house was used as a location in the movie, Lemora: A Child's Tale of the Supernatural, which also used the small jail structure on the property.

In 1981, a time capsule containing handmade bricks and squared nails from the Phillips Mansion was buried at the entrance to a master-planned community called "Phillips Ranch." The community consists of 3,000 new single-family homes and was built on the site of Louis Phillips' ranch.

The Phillips Mansion was damaged in the February 1990 Upland earthquake and the June 1991 Sierra Madre earthquake. The earthquakes caused the mansion's chimney to topple and resulted in cracks throughout the structure. The house was reopened on a limited basis for tours in October 1991, though visitors were required to wear hard hats.

Between 2002 and 2008, the Historical Society and the City of Pomona undertook extensive renovation work on the house, which was closed during this time. In July 2008, the mansion suffered a further setback when it was damaged in the Chino Hills earthquake. Though the house had been scheduled to reopen to the public in the fall of 2008, visible cracks in the front of the building and back porch pushed back the date of its reopening, but the Mansion is now open for events and tours.

== See also ==
- List of Registered Historic Places in Los Angeles County, California
