= CUSD =

CUSD is an acronym used to refer to the following school districts:

- Cambridge University Social Democrats
- Capistrano Unified School District
- Carlsbad Unified School District
- Carmel Unified School District
- Central Unified School District
- Chandler Unified School District
- Chico Unified School District
- Chinle Unified School District
- Chino Valley Unified School District (disambiguation), multiple districts
- Claremont Unified School District
- Clovis Unified School District
- Coronado Unified School District
- Cupertino Union School District
