= Locke Olson =

American basketball player

Personal information
- Born: February 10, 1926 Upland, California, U.S.
- Died: August 20, 2008 (aged 82) Buena Park, California, U.S.
- Listed height: 6 ft 7 in (2.01 m)
- Listed weight: 185 lb (84 kg)

Career information
- High school: Claremont (Claremont, California)
- College: Pomona-Pitzer (1945–1949)
- NBA draft: 1949: undrafted
- Playing career: 1949–1952
- Position: Center
- Number: 44

Career history

Playing
- 1949–1950: Santa Maria Golden Dukes
- 1951–1952: Los Angeles Fibber McGee & Mollys

Coaching
- 1955–1965?: Grossmont HS

Career highlights
- 3× First-team All-SCIAC (1947–1949)
Medals
Representing United States
Men's basketball
Pan American Games
Gold medal – first place	1955 Mexico City	Team competition

Locke Morford Olson (February 10, 1926 – August 20, 2008) was an American basketball player. He competed as part of the gold medal-winning American team at the 1955 Pan American Games in Mexico City.

== Early life and education ==
Olson was born on February 10, 1926. He attended Pomona College and played basketball for the Pomona-Pitzer Sagehens, where he became the first 1000-point scorer in the team's history.
