= Claremont High School (California) =

Claremont High School [CHS]
- Logo of Claremont High School

Location
- 1601 N. Indian Hill Blvd. Claremont, California 91711; United States; 34°06′46″N 117°43′25″W

Information
- Type: Public
- Motto: A Tradition of Excellence
- Established: 1890 (as Claremont Grammar School)
- School district: Claremont Unified School District
- CEEB code: 050590
- Principal: James Mitchell
- Faculty: 90.67 (FTE)
- Enrollment: 2,182 (2023-2024)
- Student to teacher ratio: 24.07
- Campus size: 20 acres
- Campus type: Suburban
- Colors: Maroon; Gray; White
- Slogan: "A Tradition of Excellence"
- Athletics conference: Palomares League
- Mascot: Wolf
- Team name: Wolfpack
- Rival: Damien High School Bonita High School
- Accreditation: Western Association of Schools and Colleges
- Newspaper: "The Wolfpacket"
- Yearbook: "El Espiritu"
- Website: Official site

Claremont High School is a public high school in Claremont, California, United States. Part of the Claremont Unified School District, it is a California Distinguished School, a two-time national Blue Ribbon School of Excellence (1986–1987, 1999–2000), and a nationally recognized International Baccalaureate (IB) World School. The school serves Claremont and a small section of Pomona, with a sizable amount of inter-district transfer students.

== History ==
What is now Claremont High School was founded in 1890 as the Claremont Grammar School. Originally situated on the site of present-day Sycamore Elementary School, the Grammar School had 61 pupils from Kindergarten to 8th Grade by 1891. Most high school–aged students attended Pomona College's preparatory department until it was shut down in 1911. Upon hearing the news, principal Herbert Patten rallied the local community to expand the Claremont Grammar School by opening a new high school on the corner of Indian Hill and Mesa (later Foothill) Boulevards. The newly-christened Claremont High School opened its doors on September 2, 1911. There were separate schools for children of Mexican descent, with school segregation being popular until the mid 1940s.

The original high school consisted only of the "H”-shaped building, initially built with three levels. Several additions and major remodeling projects changed the character of the original structure. A substantial addition to the north—providing classrooms, library and study hall, science labs, and auditorium was built in 1931. Seismic concerns following the Long Beach Earthquake led to removal of the third level of the “H” building in 1933, the most significant change to the original facade.

As the city evolved, so did the high school. In the late 1950s, the school board started construction of a new, more modern campus a few blocks above the old one, as it hadn’t passed the updated earthquake safety codes for public schools. They began construction in 1962. During construction, students took classes at both campuses while they operated in tandem. This ceased in 1971, when the new campus was completed and the old campus was sold. It is now a shopping center called the Old School House.

The current campus has a student population of about 2,300 students. The Dr. Brett O’Connor Student Center, named for the then-principal, opened in 2021 and houses classrooms, a cafeteria grade kitchen, and a multi purpose room. Dr. James Mitchell has been principal since the 2023-2024 school year.

== Athletics ==
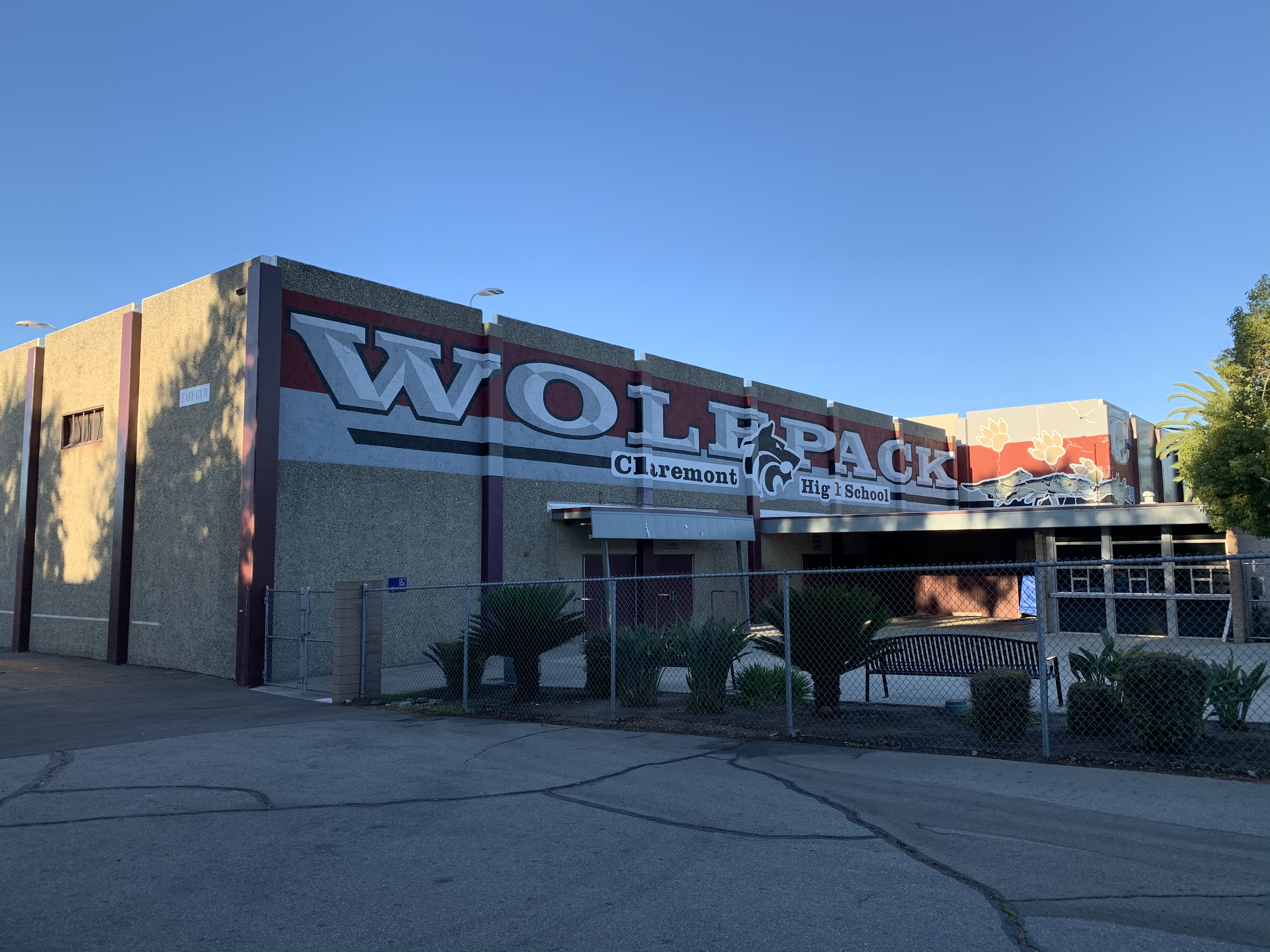
The east gymnasium

Claremont High School c. 1912

Claremont competes as part of the Palomares League and has 24 varsity athletic teams. Their sports programs include football, basketball, volleyball, golf, baseball, softball, water polo, swimming and diving, wrestling, tennis, soccer, track and field, and cross-country. The varsity football team has won 21 league championships, including 5 CIF titles. The cross-country team earned a fourth-place finish at the 2009 CIF State Meet and a third-place finish at the 2010 CIF State Meet. In recent years they have been dominant, with a 3rd place finish in 2011, 4th place finish in 2014, 4th place in 2015, 1st place State Champions in 2016, 4th place in 2017, 3rd place in 2018, and 3rd again in 2019 (All at the D2 State meets). The girls cross-country team won first-place in the 2016, 2017, and 2018 CIF State Meets, and made Nationals both in 2017 and 2018. In 2009 and 2010, the varsity tennis team won CIF titles. The soccer team won back to back league titles in 1993, 2001–2002 and 2011.

== Performing arts ==
Claremont High School is home to several performing arts programs. These include a theater department, which holds their spring musical at Pomona College’s Bridges Auditorium, as well as a dance team, improv comedy troupe, and choral groups.

=== Claremont High School Instrumental Music ===
Claremont High School's instrumental music programs include the Claremont High School Marching Wolfpack and Claremont High School Wind Ensemble, as well as a jazz band and string, chamber, and symphony orchestras. They are also home to a highly regarded color guard team, which competes as part of the band during the fall, and at winter guard competitions during the spring. The marching band competes in SCSBOA's 5A division, and has been especially competitive in the last few years, making it to championships in 2024 and 2025. The band hosts an annual marching band tournament, the Claremont Field Classic, to kick off the season. The music program also is known for its annual Battle of the Bands, where local bands compete for judges, with all proceeds benefiting the music program. The event also features student hosts performing stand-up comedy, along with sketches during intermission.

== Student journalism ==
Claremont High School offers a variety of student journalism programs and clubs in both video and print media. The Wolfpacket, the school's newspaper since 1930, publishes a monthly 12-page issue and runs a website covering school, community, and global events. While most contributors are enrolled in the journalism class, others participate outside of class. The Wolfcast, the student-run broadcast channel, focuses on school events and student interest stories, producing daily episodes. Contributors must be enrolled in the advanced video production class. Claremont’s Really Academic Paper, an online humor magazine founded in 2021, publishes monthly and is popular among students and staff. As of 2025, it has become a part of The Wolfpacket.

== Notable alumni ==
- Jessica Alba, actress, and businesswoman
- Ady Barkan, political activist and author
- Tony Beltran, MLS defender for the Real Salt Lake
- Jacob Bertrand, actor
- Jay Bhattacharya, Director of National Institutes of Health under Trump’s second term
- Brittany Brown, sprinter, 2024 Olympic bronze medalist in the 200m
- Kori Carter, NCAA and 2017 world champion in 400 meter hurdles
- Craig Colclough, operatic bass-baritone
- John Darnielle, musician and singer-songwriter, founding member of The Mountain Goats
- Malu Dreyer, German politician, Minister-President of the state of Rhineland-Palatinate, spent 1977 as an exchange student at Claremont
- Aundrea Fimbres, singer and dancer
- Justin Germano, baseball player in the U.S., Japan and Korea
- Rod Gilfry, leading American operatic baritone
- Elliot Graham, film editor
- Ben Harper, musician and singer-songwriter
- Conner Henry, former basketball player and current coach
- Martin Hewitt, actor
- Alex Hinshaw, MLB baseball player for the San Francisco Giants
- Hughes brothers, film directors, producers and screenwriters
- Todd Hughes, film director, producer and screenwriter
- Matt Jones, actor
- Dan McGwire, former NFL quarterback for the Seattle Seahawks
- Cameron Morrah, NFL tight end for the Seattle Seahawks
- Cameron Munter, U.S. Ambassador to Pakistan
- Locke Olson, gold medal-winning USA Basketball player at the 1955 Pan American Games
- Sam Quinones, journalist and former reporter for Los Angeles Times (2004-2014)
- Dileep Rao, actor
- Svetha Rao, aka Raja Kumari, singer, songwriter, and rapper
- Dave Rice, college basketball coach, UNLV
- Noah Song, professional baseball player
- Dillon Tate, baseball player
- Peter Thum, co-founder of Ethos Water
- Chad Tracy, professional baseball manager and former player
- Rozz Williams, founder of American gothic rock band Christian Death and pioneer of the American gothic rock scene.
