= CVUSD =

The abbreviation CVUSD can apply to multiple United States school districts:

- Chino Valley Unified School District (disambiguation), multiple districts
- Camp Verde Unified School District
- Castro Valley Unified School District
- Coachella Valley Unified School District
- Conejo Valley Unified School District
- Covina-Valley Unified School District
