= Bill Bertka =

American basketball coach and executive (born 1927)

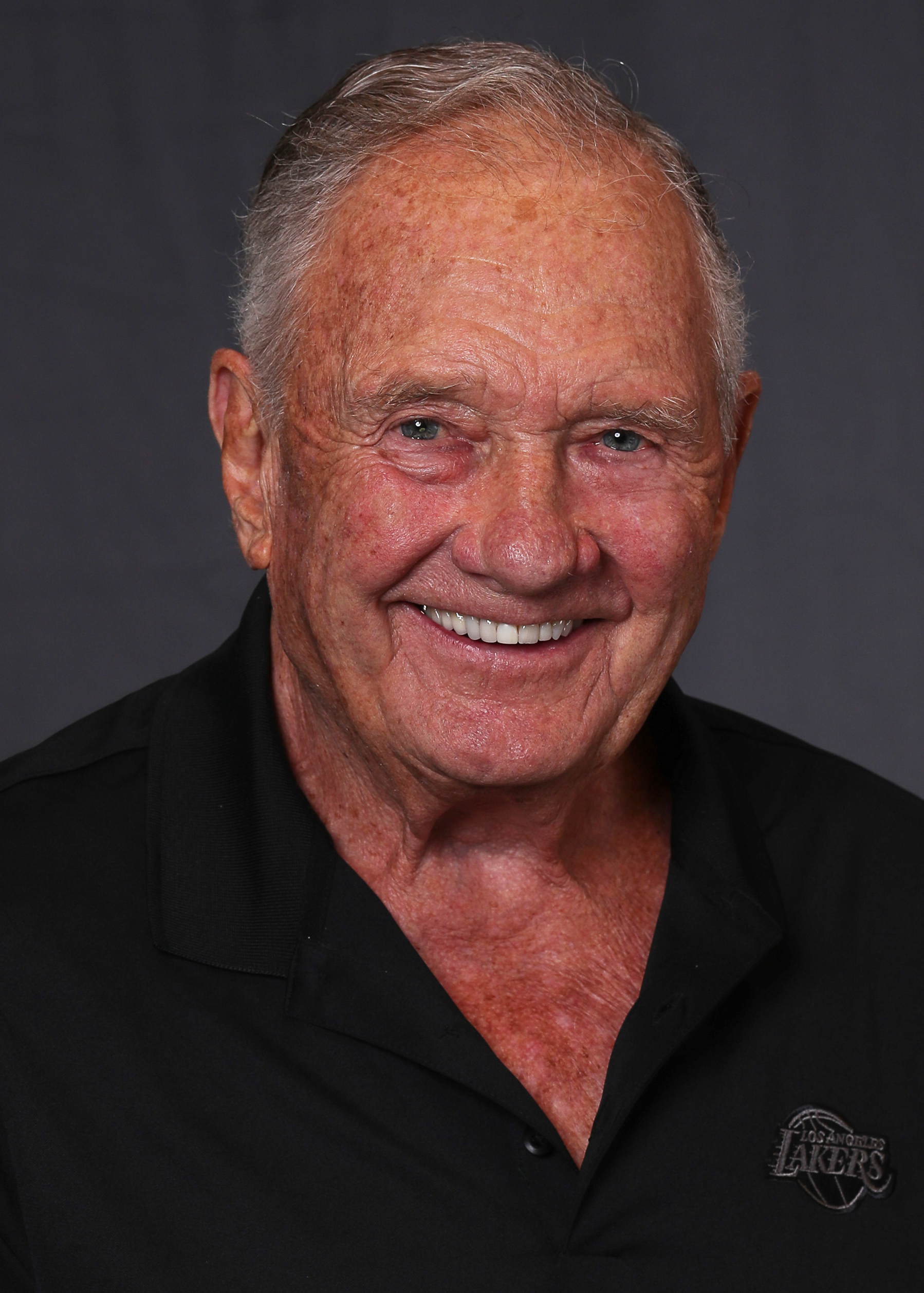
- Bertka in 2017

Personal information
- Born: August 8, 1927 (age 99) Santa Barbara, California, U.S.

Career information
- High school: Buchtel (Akron, Ohio)
- College: Kent State (1947–1951)
- Coaching career: 1951–1961, 1971–1974, 1977–2001

Career history

Coaching
- 1951–1952: Kent Roosevelt HS
- 1952–1954: Midland School
- 1954–1957: Hancock College
- 1957–1961: Kent State
- 1971–1974: Los Angeles Lakers (assistant)
- 1977–1981: New Orleans / Utah Jazz (assistant)
- 1981–2001: Los Angeles Lakers (assistant)
- 1994; 1999: Los Angeles Lakers (interim)

Career highlights
- As assistant coach: 7× NBA champion (1972, 1982, 1985, 1987, 1988, 2000, 2001); 2019 Tex Winter Assistant Coach Lifetime Impact Award; As executive: 3× NBA champion (2002, 2009, 2010)

William M. Bertka (born August 8, 1927) is a current basketball consultant/special assistant and a former National Basketball Association (NBA) assistant coach, scout and executive with the Los Angeles Lakers and New Orleans Jazz. A pioneering proponent of film study, advance scouting, player development and basketball analytics, Bertka has spent more than 50 years in the NBA and has been a part of 10 NBA championships with the Lakers, including seven as an assistant coach.

== Early life ==
Bertka was born and raised in Akron, Ohio, and credited the local Akron YMCA as the place where he developed a passion for the game of basketball. He played at nearby Buchtel High and won a city championship in 1945.

He went into the U.S. Army out of high school, serving in communications rebuilding efforts for two years in Salzburg, Austria, following the conclusion of World War II. Using the GI Bill to fund his education upon his return from Europe, Bertka attended Kent State University and played for the Division I basketball team from 1949–51.

== Pre-NBA career ==
After graduating, Bertka began a coaching journey that brought him to the West Coast. He coached at the high school level for three years before spending nine years at two different colleges. It was at that time, during a two-year span beginning in 1952, that Bertka played professionally for the Santa Maria Golden Dukes of the National Industrial Basketball League, a precursor to the NBA. In 1954, he took over in his first collegiate head coaching role at Hancock College (Santa Maria, CA), where he would later lead the Bulldogs to a 41-game winning streak and the state community college championship in 1957. Bertka also coached his alma mater of Kent State from 1957–61, where, at the age of 30, he was one of the youngest college head coaches in America.

He left coaching in 1961 to take a job as the director of community recreation for the city of Santa Barbara, where he served for a decade. It was during this time that he and his wife, Solveig, began an endeavor called "Bertka's Views" that became one of the most successful college scouting services in the country. Operating from 1961–1995, many of the nation’s premier college basketball programs utilized Bertka’s Views as their sole scouting service, which also served as a key starting point for a number of scouts and coaches that would eventually make it to the NBA. Additionally during this time, Bertka hosted Sports With Bertka, his own radio show in Santa Barbara that won three Golden Mike Awards in the 1970s.

== Professional coaching career ==
Bertka began his NBA career in 1968 when the Los Angeles Lakers followed the recommendation of former West Virginia great Rod Hundley and hired him to scout college players for the NBA Draft, making him the first full-time scout in league history. When Head Coach Bill Sharman took over the team in 1971–72, Bertka began working with players in an assistant coaching role while also adding advance scouting duties. In what was revolutionary at the time, he would compile film on upcoming opponents in order to prepare the team. That group would later go on a 33-game winning streak – still a professional sports record – en route to an NBA title, giving Bertka his first ring.

In 1974, Bertka left the Lakers to become the first general manager of the New Orleans Jazz (now the Utah Jazz) and also had an initial ownership stake in the franchise through his company, Invest West Sports. He would later serve as a Jazz assistant coach under Elgin Baylor beginning in the 1977–78 season.

In 1981, Pat Riley became head coach of the Lakers and brought Bertka back as his first assistant. Together, the duo constructed what came to be known as the Lakers “Showtime” era, guiding the team to seven NBA Finals appearances in nine seasons and winning four NBA titles (1982, 1985, 1987, 1988). During this time, Bertka and Riley created their own measure of player performance – the plus-minus system – in what became one of the league’s earliest preludes to modern basketball analytics.

Bertka remained as an assistant coach with the Lakers for two decades, later winning back-to-back championships under Head Coach Phil Jackson in 2000 and 2001, his final season on the Lakers bench. Bertka then transitioned to a primary role as Director of Scouting, a position in which he served through the 2011–12 season, winning three more league titles. He continues to advise the Lakers as a basketball consultant.

Bertka has twice served as interim coach of the Lakers. His first stint, in relief of Randy Pfund toward the end of the 1993–94 season, lasted two games. The Lakers went 1–1, winning at Dallas, 112–109, and losing at Houston, 113–107. He also replaced Del Harris in the 1998–99 season, defeating the Clippers by a score of 115–100. At 71 years of age, the interim stint made Bertka the oldest person to ever coach an NBA game.

Throughout his career, Bertka has coached some of the best players in the game’s history – including Wilt Chamberlain, Jerry West, Kareem Abdul-Jabbar, Earvin “Magic” Johnson, Shaquille O’Neal and Kobe Bryant, among others. Overall, he has 10 NBA Championship rings, including seven as an assistant coach with the Lakers and three in other roles with the team.

== Head coaching record ==
=== NBA ===
Team	Year	G	W	L	W–L%	Finish	PG	PW	PL	PW–L%	Result
LA Lakers	1993–94	2	1	1	.500	Interim coach	—	—	—	—	Interim
LA Lakers	1998–99	1	1	0	1.000	Interim coach	—	—	—	—	Interim
Career		3	2	1	.667		0	0	0	–	

== Awards and honors ==
Bertka is a member of several halls of fame, including the Santa Barbara Sports Hall of Fame (1989), the Summit County (OH) Sports Hall of Fame (1989), the Kent State University Sports Hall of Fame (2004) and the Santa Barbara Basketball Court of Champions (2014).

In July 2019, he received the prestigious Tex Winter Lifetime Achievement Award from the National Basketball Coaches Association, an honor recognizing Bertka’s extraordinary contributions to the sport throughout his career by building a body of work that has had a positive and powerful impact on the NBA coaching profession.

== Personal life ==
Bertka and wife Solveig were married in 1956 and have two daughters – Britt, who is married to veteran NBA assistant coach Jim Eyen, and Kris, married to Yankees scout Bill Pintard – and they live on a 50-acre avocado farm in Santa Barbara.
