= Santa Maria Golden Dukes =

- Nickname: The Dukes
- Leagues: AAU 1946-1956; NIBL 1952–54
- Founded: 1946
- Folded: 1954
- Arena: Old Armory Building, at the Santa Maria Fairpark
- Ownership: community-sponsored

The Santa Maria Golden Dukes were a community-run amateur club located in Santa Maria, California which competed in the Amateur Athletic Union (AAU) and the National Industrial Basketball League (NIBL) in the 1940s and 1950s. The Dukes, though they were not corporate-sponsored, were members of the amateur National Industrial Basketball League for two years, between 1952 and 1954. It was the time that the National Basketball Association was in its infancy.For the town of Santa Maria, a Golden Dukes home basketball game was an always community happening. They played their home games in the old Armory Building at the Santa Maria Fairpark on the corner of Stowell and Thornburg in Santa Maria.

== History ==
=== Duke Webster and AAU ===
Duke Webster, a Santa Maria individual who owned a service station cater corner from the Santa Maria Inn founded the team. He used to organize one campaign or another to keep the team afloat. For 4–5 years prior to the team joining the NIBL, Webster would sponsor the team, bringing in college players and becoming the Dukes' first coach.
The Golden Dukes became champions of the Santa Maria City Basketball League in 1947-48, when Santa Maria was a small town back then and just about every adult who lived here went to a Dukes home game. The team soon grew popularity though its function was strictly amateur. "The Armory Building which hosted the Dukes' games always was packed. Joe White was the leading player of the Dukes and later became a long-time Hancock College Bulldogs men's basketball coach and athletic director, with the College renaming their gym to Joe White Memorial Gymnasium in 2003.
The Dukes ran through the smoke well enough to be successful from a won-loss standpoint as well as an entertainment one. They were a very competitive team, but they did not manage to win any NIBL title, with the Phillips 66ers dominating the league. Joe White was followed by other great players like 6-9 big man William Madison Stratford a Mississippi native, who previously played for Akron Wingfoots relocated to Santa Maria and never left, Kenny Milo, Bill Bertka, while Lawrence "Hop" Findlay was the team' coach.

=== 1952-1954: NIBL ===
In 1952 Duke Webster decided to step things up, with team joining the NIBL, and acquiring good players like point guard Patty Sims. The competition was tough. The Santa Maria franchise was very unusual being only community-sponsored team in the league. The other NIBL teams were corporate-sponsored, meaning their players would have jobs with the companies that sponsored them. But the fact that California had a community-sponsored team was unique in itself. The Dukes finished third in their first season and fifth in the second.
The population of Santa Maria back then was around 18,000, but local prominent rancher families such as he Ferrinnis, the Elks and the Tognazzinis helped to keep the Dukes alive. In 1953 the Dukes signed Quentin Sims who had a significant career with the team.
After their career with the Dukes, several players thrived in the town. Kenny Milo became Superintendent of Schools, Dale Hyatt became a principal, teacher and superintendent in Orcutt, Paul Howard was a prominent man in town, and Roger Brown was a prominent civic guy in Santa Maria.

== Notable players ==
- Bill Bertka
- Bob McCutcheon
- Kenny Milo
- Joe White
- William Madison Stratford
- Quentin Sims
- Gene Snyder
- Paul Howard
- Omer Meeker
- Roger Brown
- Dale Hyatt
- Harvey Huber
- Sherman Nearman
- Gus Rischer
- Fred Nelson
- Hal Rayborn
