= Torojoatngna =

Tongva village in California

Coordinates: 34.1117°N 117.7168°W

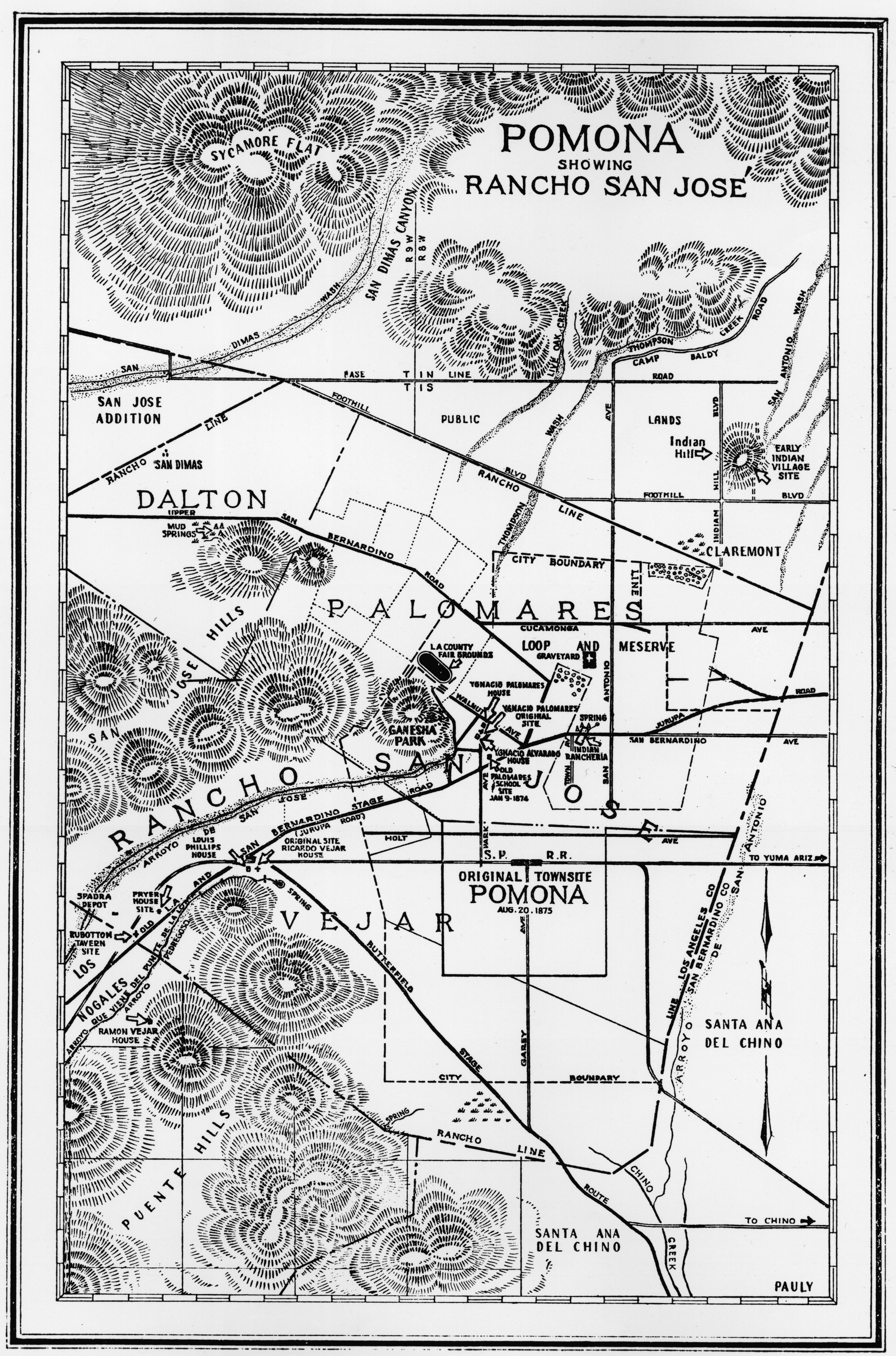
An early twentieth century map showing the former Tongva village called "Indian Hill" (top right).

Torojoatngna ("the place below Joat" or "the place below snowy mountain") was a Tongva village located in what is now Claremont, California. The name of the village referred the place below Mount San Antonio as the place of snow. Archaeological investigations in the Claremont area have found evidence of village artifacts near the "Indian Hill" area of the city, located near the Rancho Santa Ana Botanic Gardens.

== History ==
The Tongva had established villages in the area as early as 7000 B.C.

The land came under the influence of Spanish colonizers with the establishment and growth of Mission San Gabriel in 1771.

The First Mexican Republic secularized the missions in 1833, dissolving its lands into ranchos. Rancho San Jose was established in the area by 1837.

In 1870, the village was still active with over 200 residents, many of whom worked at local ranchos such as Spadra and Puente to survive. In 1873 however a smallpox outbreak ravaged the village and by 1883 it was noted that it had been abandoned.

The village site was recorded on a map published in the early twentieth century.
