= Padua Hills Theatre =

- U.S. National Register of Historic Places
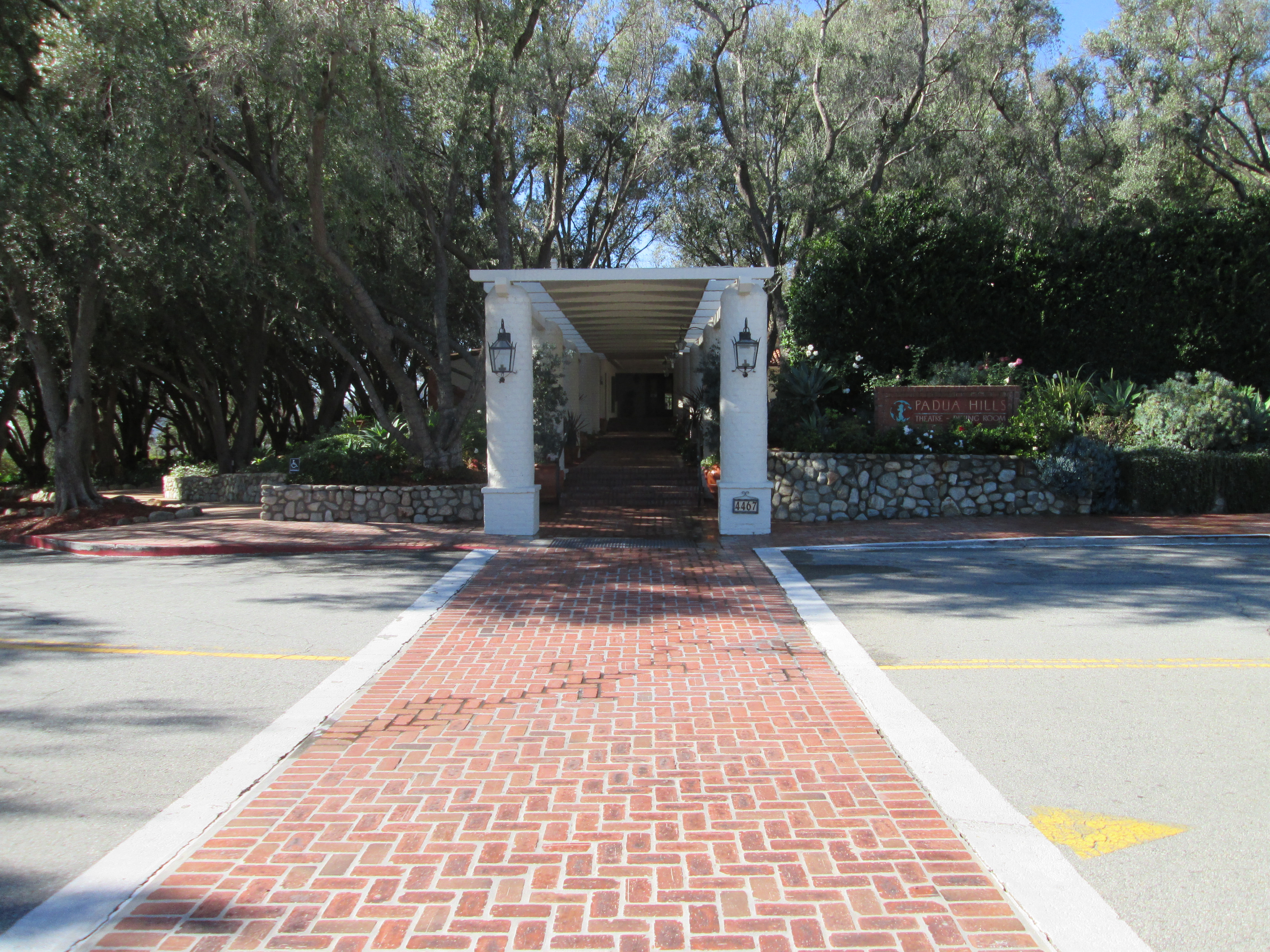
- Entrance to the theater

- Location within the Los Angeles metropolitan area Location within California Location within the United States
- Location: 4467 Via Padova, Claremont, California
- Coordinates: 34°9′4″N 117°42′3″W
- Area: 6.6 acres (2.7 ha)
- Architect: Marston & Maybury; Storm & Manhoney
- Architectural style: Mission/Spanish Revival
- NRHP reference No.: 97001660
- Added to NRHP: January 23, 1998

Padua Hills Theatre (1931–1974) was the longest running theater featuring Mexican-theme musicals in the United States. It operated as a non-profit business promoting intercultural understanding between European Americans and those of Mexican-descent.

== History ==
Padua Hills was a 2,000-acre tract of land directed by Bess Garner and Herman Garner. It was subdivided into a 6-acre artist colony called the Little Theater Association with a central dining room, artist studio, shops, and a small theatre. Located three miles north of Foothill Boulevard in the City of Claremont, the Spanish Revival buildings were nestled at the base of the mountains and surrounded by lush trees and shrubs. As described by the National Register of Historic Places, "The complex is situated on six acres of land and includes three buildings--a theater and restaurant building, an adjacent apartment, and a studio/residence--grouped around a central courtyard. The landscaping of olive trees and rock walls and curbing, along with an outdoor stage structure are contributing site features. A 'Padua Hills Theatre' sign with a pair of Mexican folk dancers and a life-sized statue of an Indian maiden add to the mood of the setting." The theatre was operated by the Padua Institute, a non-profit educational corporation. Offering courses in Mexican folk music, dance, and Spanish, the institute was advertised for its work in preserving the Spanish and Mexican heritage of early California.

== Theatre ==
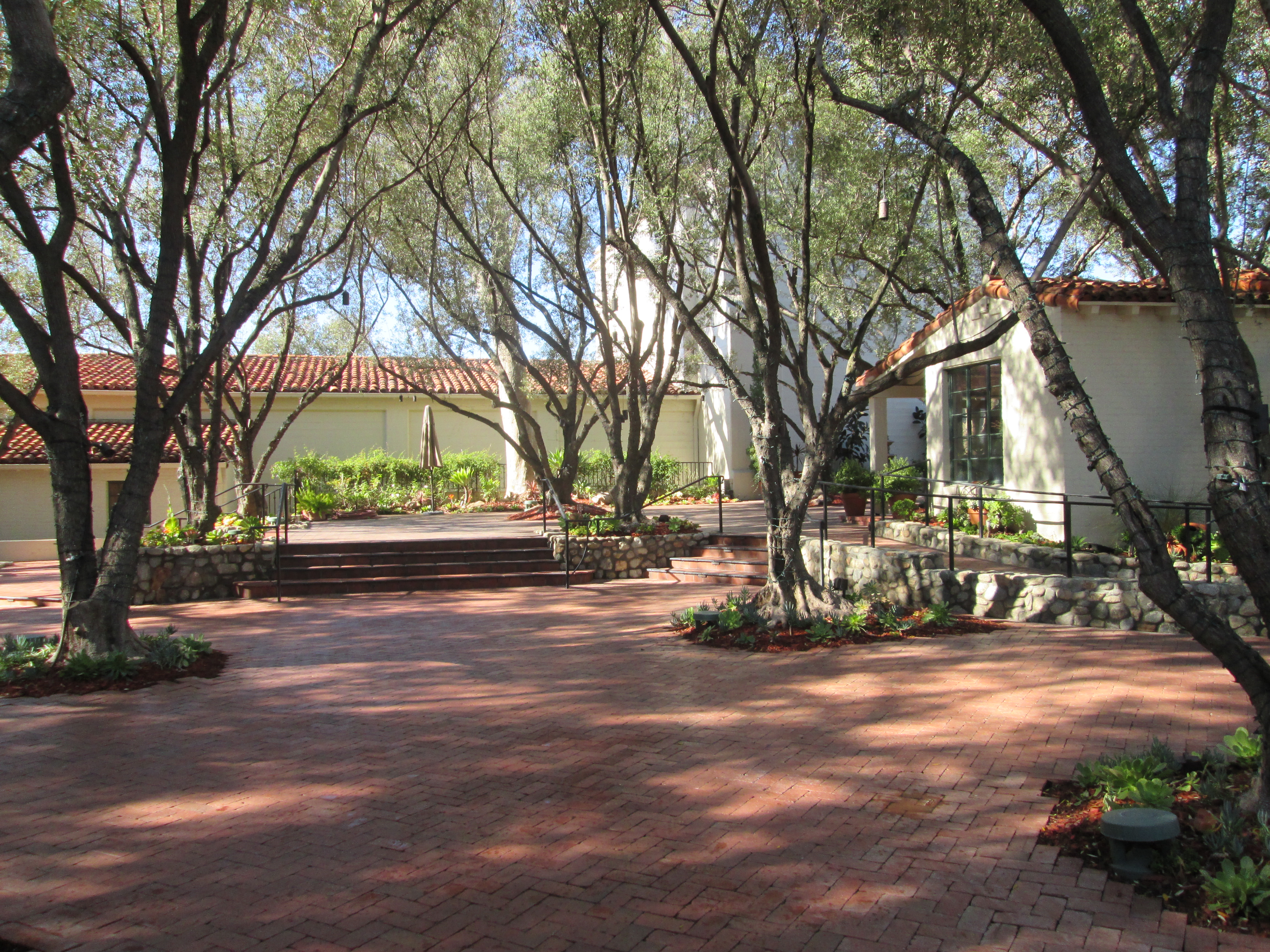
Theater courtyard

Although originating as a small community theater featuring the Claremont Community Players in the hills of Claremont in southern California, by the depression years Padua Hills featured dinner theatre by the "Mexican Players." The group presented plays, songs, and dances for theatre patrons from 1931 to 1974. Although performing in Spanish, the performances drew primarily an Anglo audience. These efforts were consistent with a larger move towards what has been called the Spanish Fantasy Past, a nostalgic remembering of a bygone pre-Anglo past. Other examples of this regional mythology that are popularly recognized by historians include the San Gabriel Mission Play, Los Angeles Olvera Street, and Helen Hunt Jackson's popular novel Ramona.

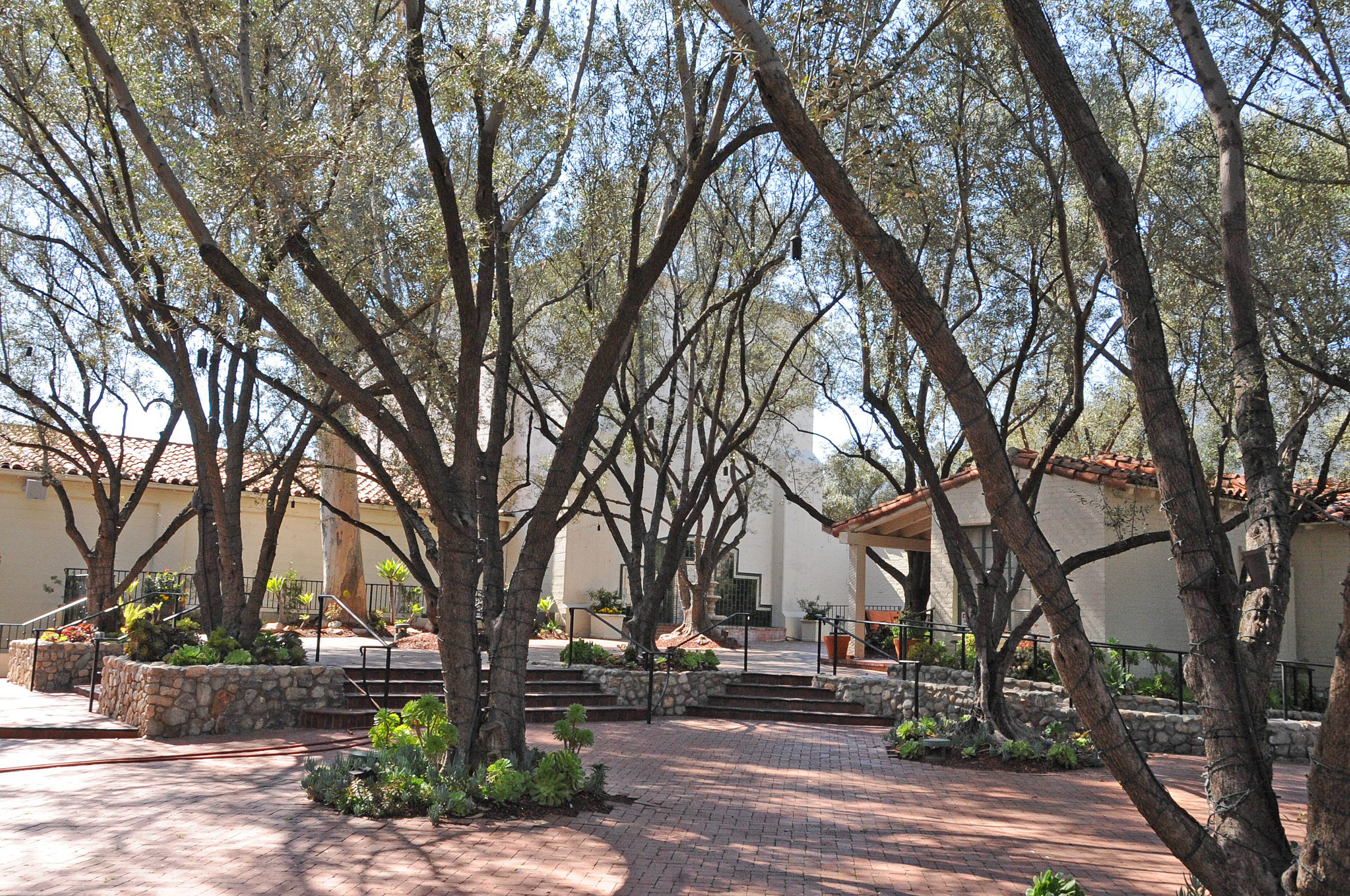
Theater courtyard

The Padua plays were unique in their blending of this "pastoral pageantry" with the more lauded "ethnic theater," whose purpose was to inform and educate the general public about the cultural attributes of Mexican, Spanish and early Californian life.

== Mexican Players (Paduanos) ==
The focus of the Padua experience were the Mexican Players. The Garners largely recruited the players from the nearby Claremont neighborhood. Although their most visible task was to provide entertainment, they were also responsible for cooking, maintaining the property, and waiting on tables. Each performance was followed by a jamaica (a post-production party) in which theatre patrons and the Paduanos (as the Mexican Players referred to themselves) interacted in a festive setting. The expressed intent of the business was to form an "intercultural understanding" between Anglo-Americans and Mexican/ Mexican-Americans. Although seeking to positively portray Mexican culture, the institute's efforts have since been critiqued for distorting California history and replacing old stereotypes of Mexicans as threatening with new stereotypes of Mexicans as politically benign.

Despite the political criticisms of Mexican American folk theater, Paduanos found opportunities for self-discovery, to forge strong relationships, and to achieve successful careers in theatre and beyond. Participation in the plays allowed the players to share their artistic talents where elsewhere there were few opportunities for Latino/a actors. For the larger community, it created an atmosphere in which negative attitudes towards Mexican Americans were temporarily averted. And, it created a space where Mexican American youth received training in song and dance resulting in their theatrical advancement. Bess Garner was primarily responsible for working with the players and has been remembered both fondly and as a well-intentioned woman who, consistent with racial attitudes of the time, could be maternalistic towards the players, actively discouraging movement to Hollywood studios, and act condescendingly towards youth housed on the Padua grounds.

=== Notable List of Players ===
- Natividad Vacío, film and television actor
- Maximina Zuñiga
- Lilly & Manuel Aguilar of Lilly Aguilar Dancers. Lilly Aguilar Pioneer Award for bringing Mexican folk dance to Los Angeles County

== Current Uses ==
After the theater's closing in the 1980s, the main dining room and grounds have been used to host weddings and special events under the management of Chantrelles Fine Catering, later Padua Weddings.
