= Claremont Unified School District =

School district in California, United States

Location
- San Gabriel Valley region USA

District information
- Grades: Kindergarten to 12th
- Superintendent: Dr. James Elsasser
- Schools: 11 schools total; 7 elementary schools, 1 middle school, 2 high schools.
- NCES District ID: 0608760

Students and staff
- Students: 7,113

Other information
- Website: cusd.claremont.edu

Claremont Unified School District is a Los Angeles County school district in Claremont, California. It consists of 7 elementary schools, 1 intermediate and 2 high schools.

== Schools ==
=== Elementary ===
- Chaparral Elementary
- Condit Elementary
- Danbury Elementary
- Mountain View Elementary
- Oakmont Elementary
- Sumner Danbury Elementary
- Sycamore Elementary
- Vista Del Valle Elementary

=== Intermediate ===
- El Roble Intermediate School

==== Former ====
- La Puerta Intermediate School (Closed in 1978)

=== High Schools ===
- Claremont High School
- San Antonio High School (continuation school)

== Areas Served ==
The district serves Claremont and a section of Pomona.
