= Claremont, California =

City in California, United States

- City
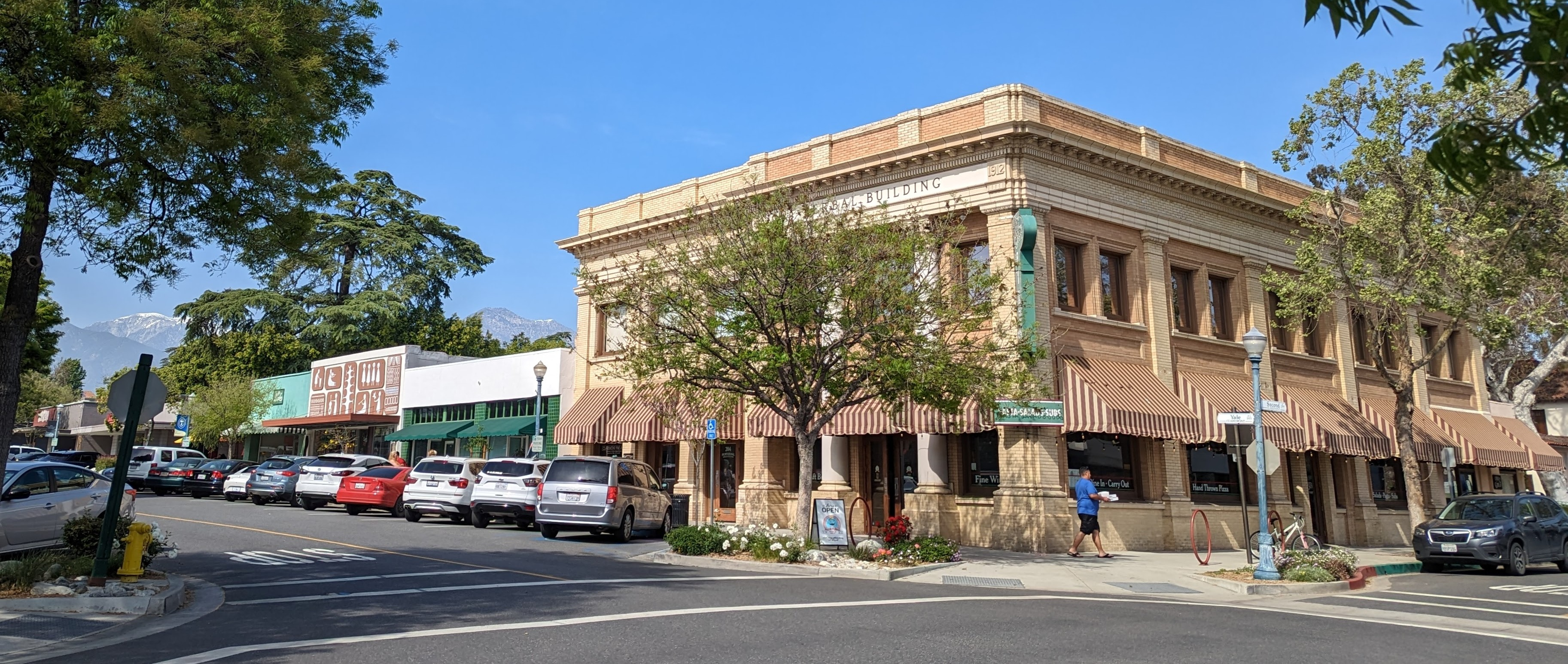
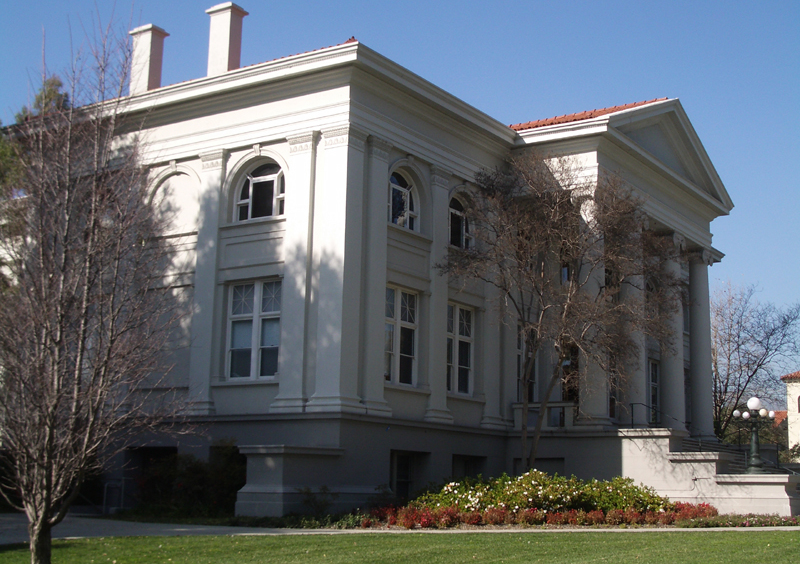
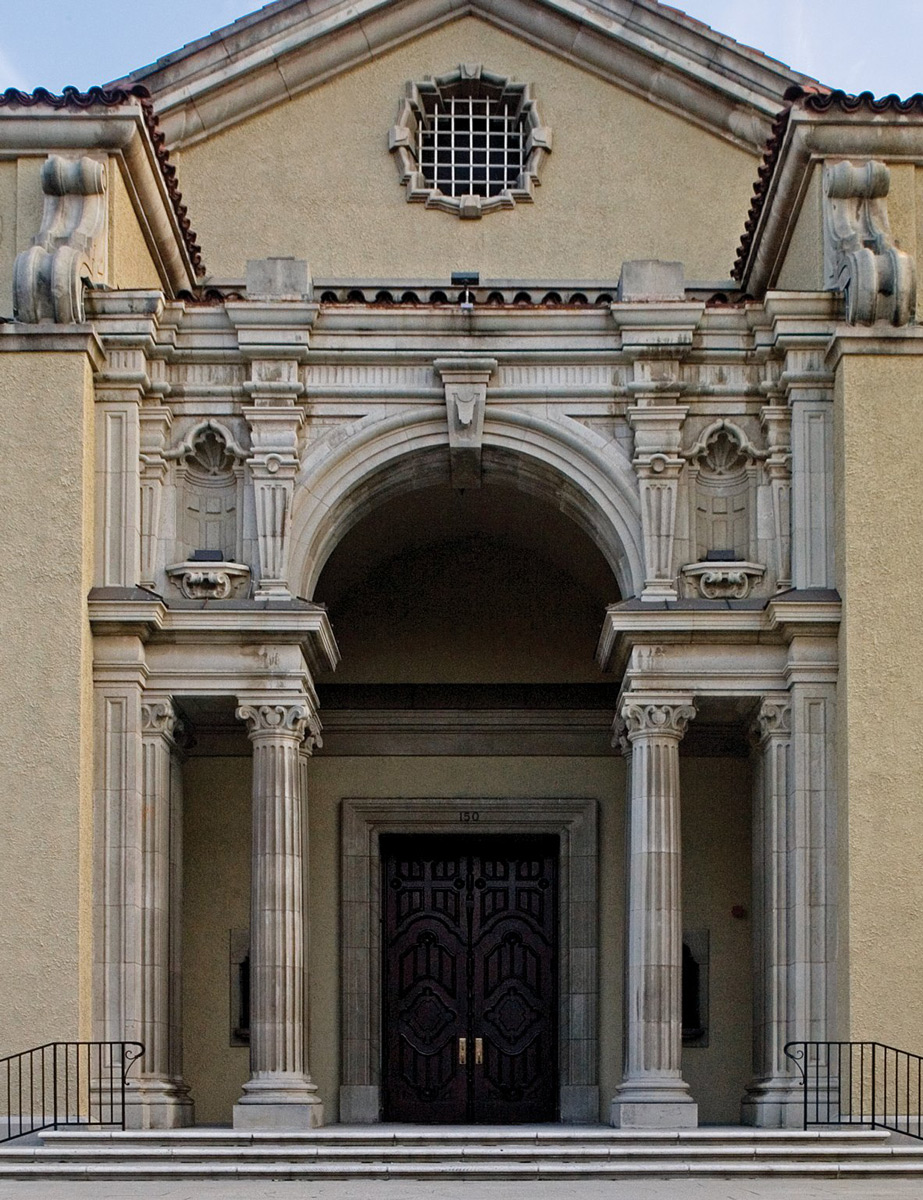
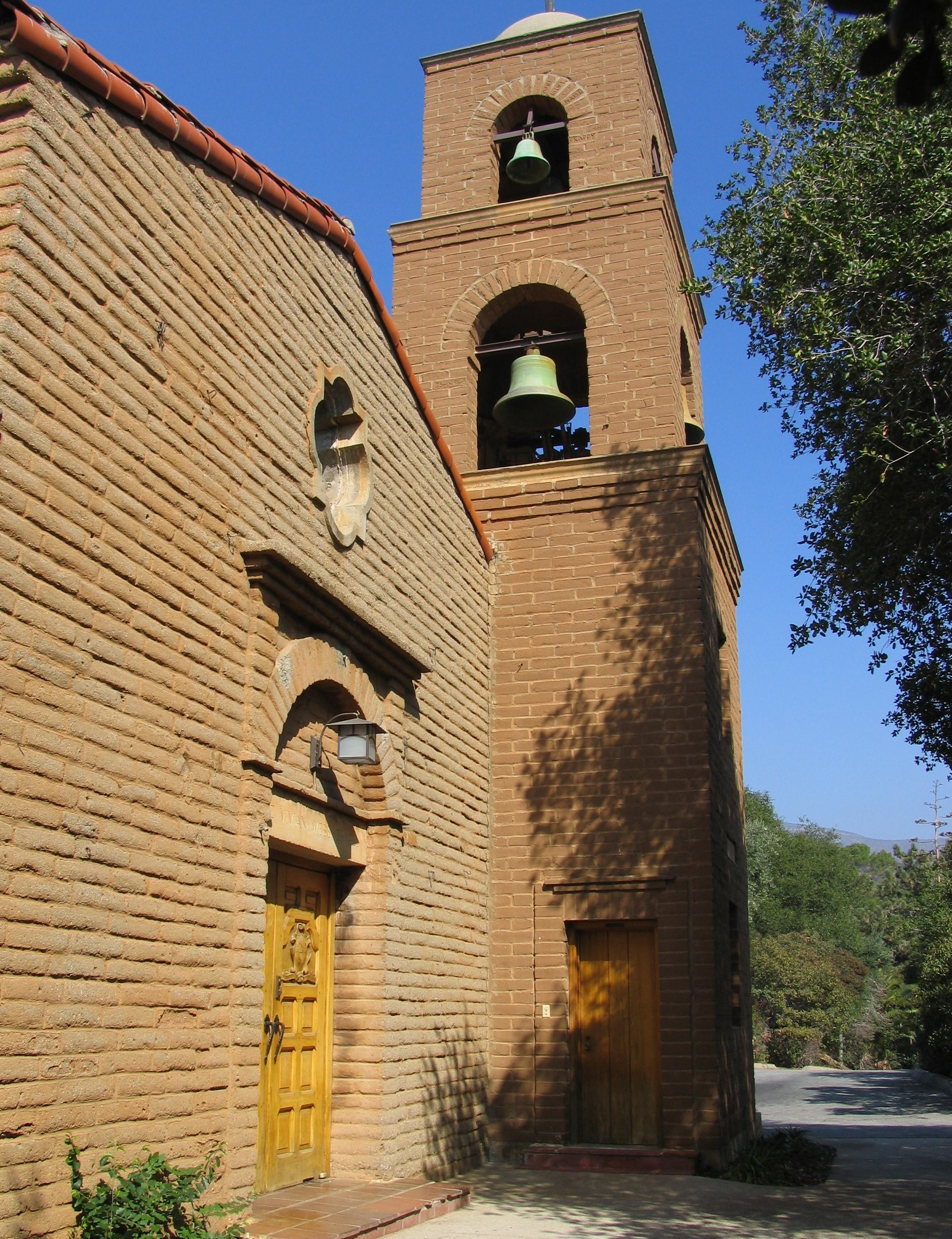
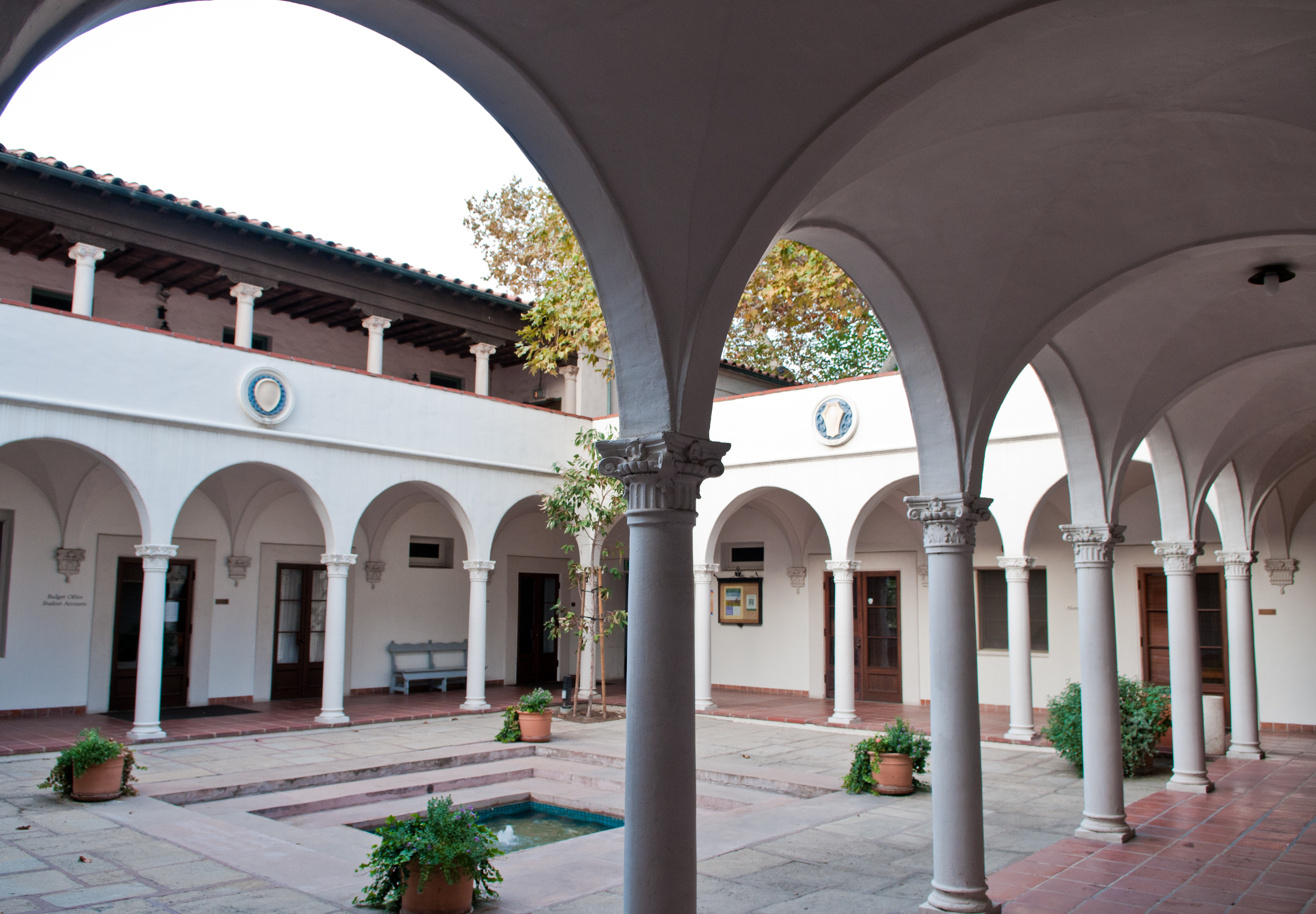
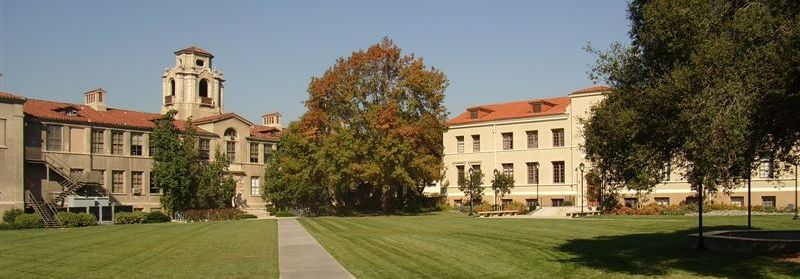
- Clockwise from top: Verbal Building in the Claremont Village; Bridges Hall of Music at Pomona College; Scripps College; Pomona's academic quad; The Webb Schools; Pomona's Carnegie Library

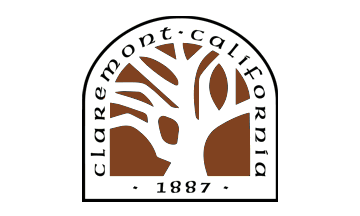
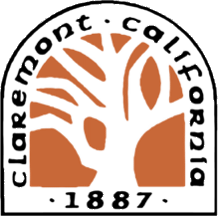
- Flag Seal
- Nickname: City of Trees and PhDs
- Interactive map of Claremont, California
- Location of Claremont in Los Angeles County, California Location of Claremont in California Location of Claremont in the USA
- Coordinates: 34°6′36″N 117°43′11″W
- Country: United States
- State: California
- County: Los Angeles
- Incorporated: October 3, 1907

Government
  - Type: Council–manager
  - Mayor: Corey Calaycay
  - Mayor Pro Tem: Jennifer Stark
  - City Council: Ed Reece; Jed Leano; Sal Medina
  - City Manager: Adam Pirrie

Area
  - Total: 13.47 sq mi (34.89 km^{2})
  - Land: 13.34 sq mi (34.54 km^{2})
  - Water: 0.14 sq mi (0.35 km^{2}) 1.03%
- Elevation: 1,168 ft (356 m)

Population (2020)
  - Total: 37,266
  - Density: 2,794.6/sq mi (1,079.01/km^{2})
- Demonym: Claremontian
- Time zone: UTC−8 (PST)
  - Summer (DST): UTC−7 (PDT)
- ZIP Code: 91711
- Area code: 909
- FIPS code: 06-13756
- GNIS feature IDs: 1652685, 2409465
- Commuter rail: Claremont
- Website: claremontca.gov

Claremont (/ˈklɛərmɒnt/ KLAIR-mont) is a suburban city in eastern Los Angeles County, California, United States, 30 miles (48 km) east of Los Angeles. It lies in the San Gabriel Valley at the foothills of the San Gabriel Mountains. As of the 2010 census, it had a population of 34,926, and in 2020 the population was 37,266.

Claremont is home to the seven Claremont Colleges and several other educational institutions and is known for its tree-lined streets with numerous historic buildings. Because of this, it is sometimes referred to as "The City of Trees and Ph.Ds." It was named the best suburb in the West by Sunset Magazine in 2016, which described it as a "small city that blends worldly sophistication with small-town appeal." In 2018, Niche rated Claremont as the 17th-best place to live in the Los Angeles area out of 658 communities it evaluated, based on crime, cost of living, job opportunities, and local amenities.

The city is primarily residential, with a significant portion of its commercial activity located in "The Village," a popular collection of street-front small stores, boutiques, art galleries, offices, and restaurants adjacent to and west of the Claremont Colleges. The Village was expanded in 2007 with a multi-use development that included a cinema, a boutique hotel, retail space, offices, and a parking structure on the site of an old citrus packing plant west of Indian Hill Boulevard. Claremont also hosts several large retirement communities.

Claremont has been a winner of the National Arbor Day Association's Tree City USA award for 22 consecutive years. When the city incorporated in 1907, local citizens started what has become the city's tree-planting tradition. Claremont is one of the few remaining places in North America with American elm trees that have not been exposed to Dutch elm disease. The stately trees line Indian Hill Boulevard in the vicinity of the city's Memorial Park.

== History ==
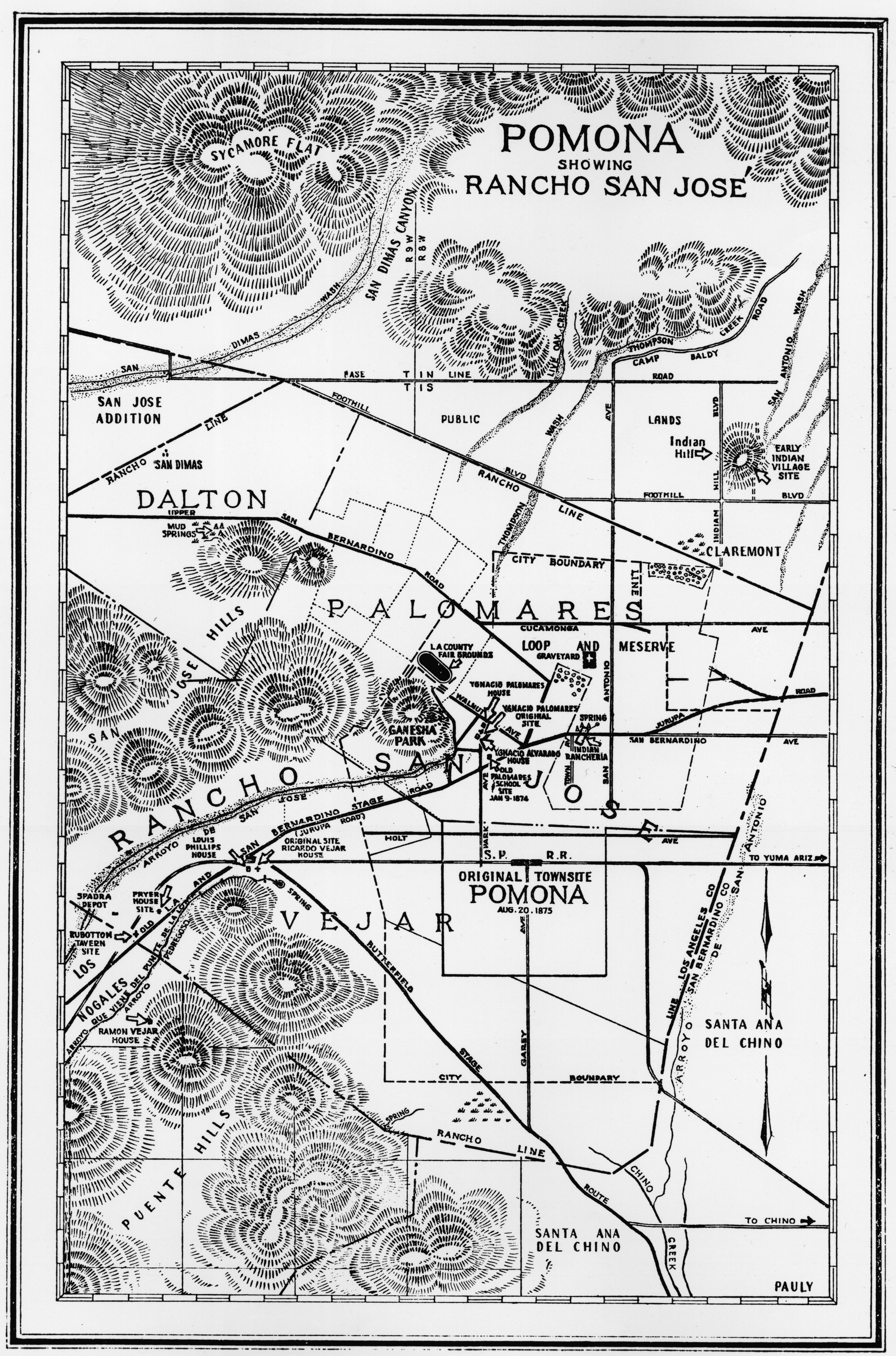
An early twentieth century map showing the city of Claremont and the site of the former Tongva village called "Indian Hill" (top right)

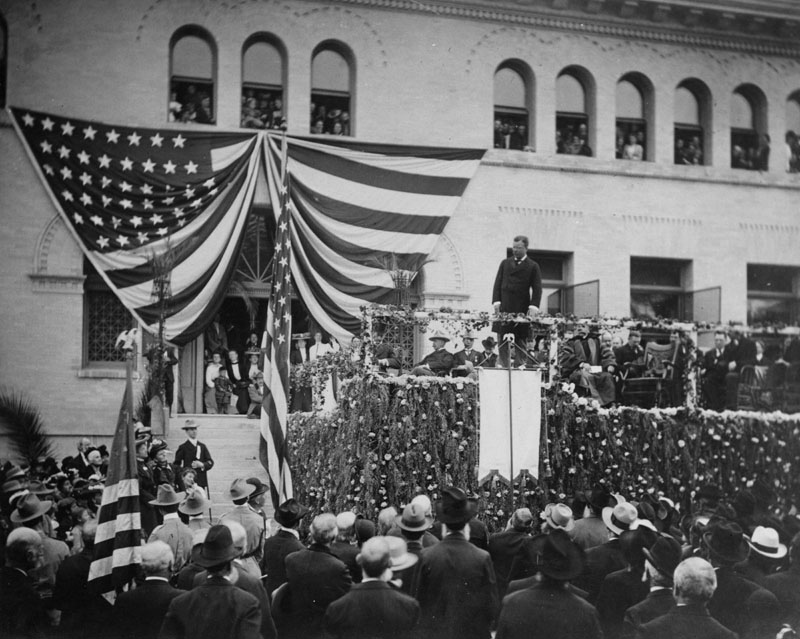
President Theodore Roosevelt speaks at Pomona College in 1903.

Prior to the establishment of the city of Claremont, the area was frequented by the Serrano, Cahuilla, and Tongva for thousands of years. The Tongva established villages in the area as early as 7000 B.C. and thrived from the freshwater of what the Spanish would call the San Antonio Creek. One well-documented Tongva village, known as Torojoatngna, was located at a place called "Indian Hill" by early American settlers. The village was active until the nineteenth century, housing nearly 200 residents in 1870, yet was eventually abandoned after being ravaged by a smallpox epidemic by 1883.

The city of Claremont was first mapped out by developers in a land boom precipitated by the arrival of transcontinental railroads to Southern California. It was likely named after Claremont, New Hampshire. The early history of the city was closely tied to that of Pomona College, which moved there in early 1890. In 1902, a town meeting vote established that east–west streets would be numbered and north–south streets named after colleges and universities. The city was incorporated in 1907.

The citrus groves and open space which once dominated the northern portion of the city have been replaced by residential developments of large homes. Construction of Stone Canyon Preserve, one of the final residential tract developments in the north of the city, commenced in 2003 as part of a complicated agreement between Pomona and the City of Claremont which resulted in the creation of the 1,740-acre (7.0 km^{2}) Wilderness Park. The foothill area also includes the Padua Hills Theatre (a historic site constructed in 1930) and the Claraboya residential area.

== Geography ==
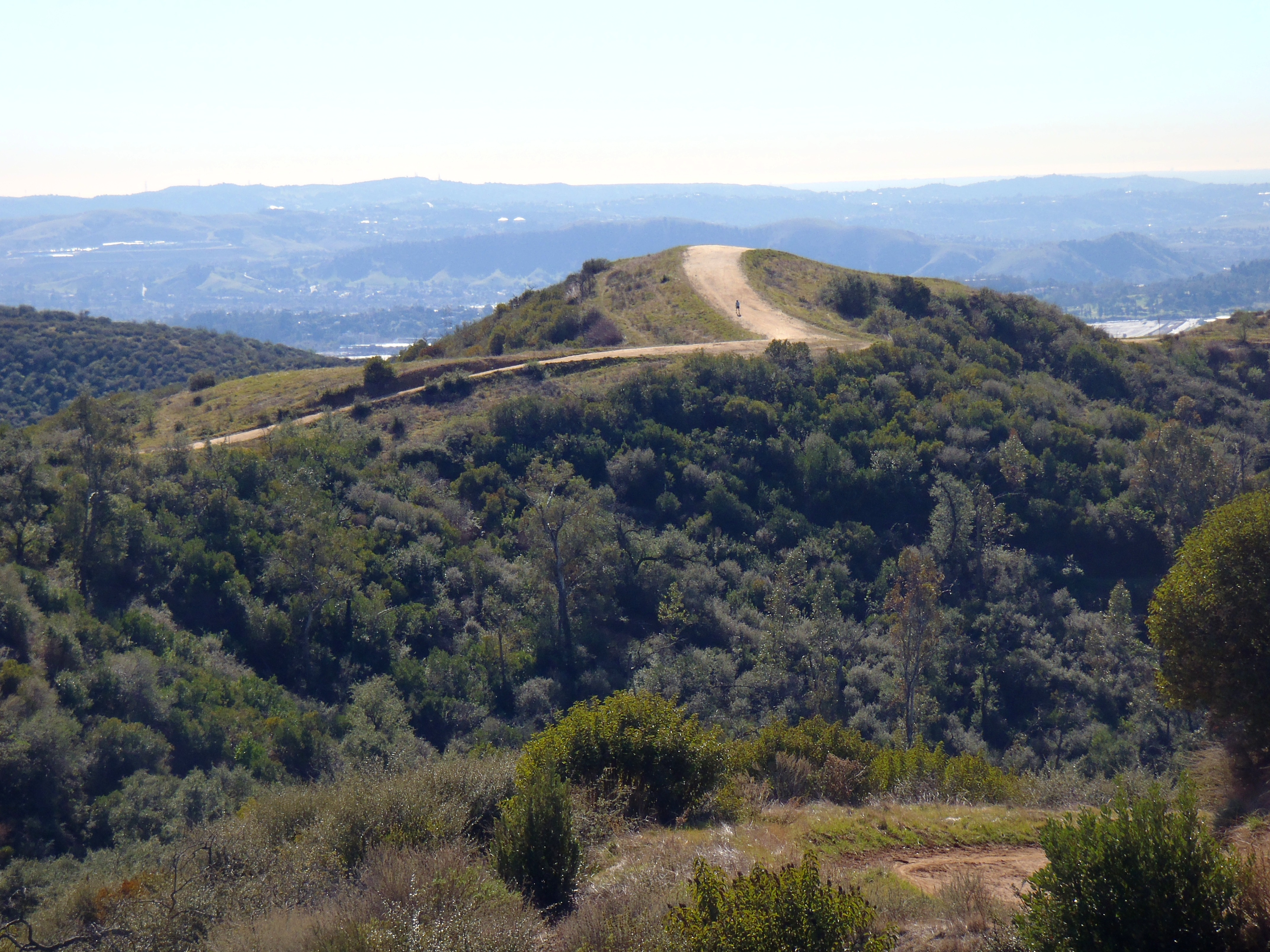
Claremont Hills Wilderness Park

According to the United States Census Bureau, the city has a total area of 13.35 square miles (34.6 km^{2}), of which 13.3 square miles (34 km^{2}) is land and 0.05 square miles (0.13 km^{2}) (1.03%) is water. Claremont is located at the eastern end of Los Angeles County and borders the cities of Upland and Montclair in San Bernardino County, as well as the cities of Pomona and La Verne in Los Angeles County. It is geographically located in the Pomona Valley. Claremont is approximately 30 miles (48 km) east of downtown Los Angeles.

=== Climate ===
Claremont has a Mediterranean climate (Köppen climate classification Csa). During the summer, temperatures may rise above 100 °F (38 °C). In the autumn, Claremont can experience the gusty "Santa Ana Winds", which can bring fire danger to nearby foothill areas. As winter comes, most of the city's annual rainfall occurs, which is typical of the Los Angeles metropolitan area given the climate. Snow is rare in Claremont, but can be viewed in the nearby San Gabriel Mountains in the winter. In the late spring, Claremont can receive many overcast days due to the strong onshore flow from the ocean. This is typically called "May Gray" or "June Gloom" in the region.

Climate data for Claremont, California
Month	Jan	Feb	Mar	Apr	May	Jun	Jul	Aug	Sep	Oct	Nov	Dec	Year
Mean daily maximum °F (°C)	68 (20)	69 (21)	71 (22)	76 (24)	79 (26)	84 (29)	90 (32)	92 (33)	89 (32)	80 (27)	74 (23)	68 (20)	78.0 (25.6)
Mean daily minimum °F (°C)	43 (6)	45 (7)	47 (8)	49 (9)	54 (12)	58 (14)	62 (17)	62 (17)	60 (16)	55 (13)	47 (8)	42 (6)	52 (11)
Average precipitation inches (mm)	3.11 (79)	4.76 (121)	2.63 (67)	1.20 (30)	0.23 (5.8)	0.09 (2.3)	0 (0)	0.03 (0.76)	0.15 (3.8)	1.05 (27)	1.62 (41)	2.45 (62)	17.32 (439.66)

== Demographics ==
Historical population
Census	Pop.	Note	%±
1910	1,114		—
1920	1,728		55.1%
1930	2,719		57.3%
1940	3,057		12.4%
1950	6,327		107.0%
1960	12,633		99.7%
1970	24,776		96.1%
1980	31,028		25.2%
1990	32,503		4.8%
2000	33,998		4.6%
2010	34,926		2.7%
2020	37,266		6.7%
U.S. Decennial Census; 1860–1870 1880-1890; 1900 1910 1920; 1930 1940 1950; 1960 1970 1980; 1990 2000 2010; 2020

Claremont first appeared as a city in the 1910 U.S. census as part of the now defunct San Jose Township (pop 7,696 in 1900). It became part of the larger East San Gabriel Valley Division in the 1960 U.S. census and since 2000, as the East San Gabriel Valley Census County Division (CCD).

=== Racial and ethnic composition ===
Claremont city, California – Racial and ethnic composition Note: the US Census treats Hispanic/Latino as an ethnic category. This table excludes Latinos from the racial categories and assigns them to a separate category. Hispanics/Latinos may be of any race.
Race / Ethnicity (NH = Non-Hispanic)	Pop 1980	Pop 1990	Pop 2000	Pop 2010	Pop 2020	% 1980	% 1990	% 2000	% 2010	% 2020
White alone (NH)	25,816	24,742	22,098	20,568	17,628	83.41%	76.12%	65.00%	58.89%	47.30%
Black or African American alone (NH)	1,356	1,568	1,642	1,560	1,793	4.38%	4.82%	4.83%	4.47%	4.78%
Native American or Alaska Native alone (NH)	76	104	81	80	90	0.25%	0.32%	0.24%	0.23%	0.24%
Asian alone (NH)	1,294	2,717	3,851	4,500	5,809	4.18%	8.36%	11.33%	12.88%	15.59%
Native Hawaiian or Pacific Islander alone (NH)	1,294	2,717	44	35	49	4.18%	8.36%	0.13%	0.10%	0.13%
Other race alone (NH)	92	38	87	71	272	0.30%	0.12%	0.26%	0.20%	0.73%
Mixed race or Multiracial (NH)	x	x	974	1,193	2,219	x	x	2.86%	3.42%	5.95%
Hispanic or Latino (any race)	2,316	3,334	5,221	6,919	9,416	7.48%	10.26%	15.36%	19.81%	25.27%
Total	30,950	32,503	33,998	34,926	37,266	100.00%	100.00%	100.00%	100.00%	100.00%

=== 2020 census ===
As of the 2020 census, Claremont had a population of 37,266, with a population density of 2,794.6 inhabitants per square mile (1,079.0/km^{2}). The racial makeup was 52.8% White, 5.1% African American, 0.8% Native American, 15.8% Asian, 0.1% Pacific Islander, 8.8% from other races, and 16.5% from two or more races; Hispanic or Latino people of any race were 25.3% of the population.

The census reported that 83.4% of the population lived in households, 15.6% lived in non-institutionalized group quarters, and 1.1% were institutionalized. In addition, 98.2% of residents lived in urban areas, while 1.8% lived in rural areas.

There were 12,050 households, of which 29.4% had children under the age of 18 living in them. Of all households, 53.1% were married-couple households, 4.6% were cohabiting couple households, 14.4% had a male householder with no spouse or partner present, and 27.9% had a female householder with no spouse or partner present. About 25.4% of households were one-person households, and 13.5% had someone living alone who was 65 years of age or older. The average household size was 2.58. There were 8,363 families (69.4% of all households).

The age distribution was 16.4% under the age of 18, 21.5% aged 18 to 24, 19.1% aged 25 to 44, 23.3% aged 45 to 64, and 19.7% who were 65 years of age or older. The median age was 38.5 years. For every 100 females, there were 86.1 males, and for every 100 females age 18 and over there were 82.5 males age 18 and over.

There were 12,752 housing units at an average density of 956.3 units per square mile (369.2 units/km^{2}); 12,050 (94.5%) were occupied and 702 (5.5%) were vacant. Of the occupied units, 63.6% were owner-occupied and 36.4% were renter-occupied. The homeowner vacancy rate was 1.0%, and the rental vacancy rate was 5.1%.

=== 2023 ACS 5-year estimates ===
In 2023, the US Census Bureau estimated that the median household income was $122,127, and the per capita income was $54,163. About 4.0% of families and 5.9% of the population were below the poverty line.

=== 2010 census ===
The 2010 United States census reported that Claremont had a population of 34,926. The population density was 2,589.7 inhabitants per square mile (999.9/km^{2}). The racial makeup of Claremont was 24,666 (70.6%) White (58.9% Non-Hispanic White), 1,651 (4.7%) African American, 172 (0.5%) Native American, 4,564 (13.1%) Asian, 38 (0.1%) Pacific Islander, 2,015 (5.8%) from other races, and 1,820 (5.2%) from two or more races. Hispanic or Latino people of any race were 6,919 persons (19.8%).

The Census reported that 29,802 people (85.3% of the population) lived in households, 4,926 (14.1%) lived in non-institutionalized group quarters, and 198 (0.6%) were institutionalized.

There were 11,608 households, out of which 3,576 (30.8%) had children under the age of 18 living in them, 6,305 (54.3%) were opposite-sex married couples living together, 1,223 (10.5%) had a female householder with no husband present, 397 (3.4%) had a male householder with no wife present. There were 429 (3.7%) unmarried opposite-sex partnerships, and 138 (1.2%) same-sex married couples or partnerships. 2,957 households (25.5%) were made up of individuals, and 1,556 (13.4%) had someone living alone who was 65 years of age or older. The average household size was 2.57. There were 7,925 families (68.3% of all households); the average family size was 3.1.

The population was spread out, with 6,459 people (18.5%) under the age of 18, 6,778 people (19.4%) aged 18 to 24, 6,940 people (19.9%) aged 25 to 44, 8,979 people (25.7%) aged 45 to 64, and 5,770 people (16.5%) who were 65 years of age or older. The median age was 38.6 years. For every 100 females, there were 88.4 males. For every 100 females age 18 and over, there were 84.7 males.

There were 12,156 housing units at an average density of 901.3 units per square mile (348.0 units/km^{2}), of which 7,700 (66.3%) were owner-occupied, and 3,908 (33.7%) were occupied by renters. The homeowner vacancy rate was 0.9%; the rental vacancy rate was 5.5%. 21,209 people (60.7% of the population) lived in owner-occupied housing units, and 8,593 people (24.6%) lived in rental housing units.

During 2009–13, Claremont had a median household income of $87,324, with 7.2% of the population living below the federal poverty line.

German (12.0%) and English (11.6%) were the most common ancestries according to the 2000 census. Mexico (12.7%) and Taiwan (11%) were the most common foreign places of birth.

== Economy ==
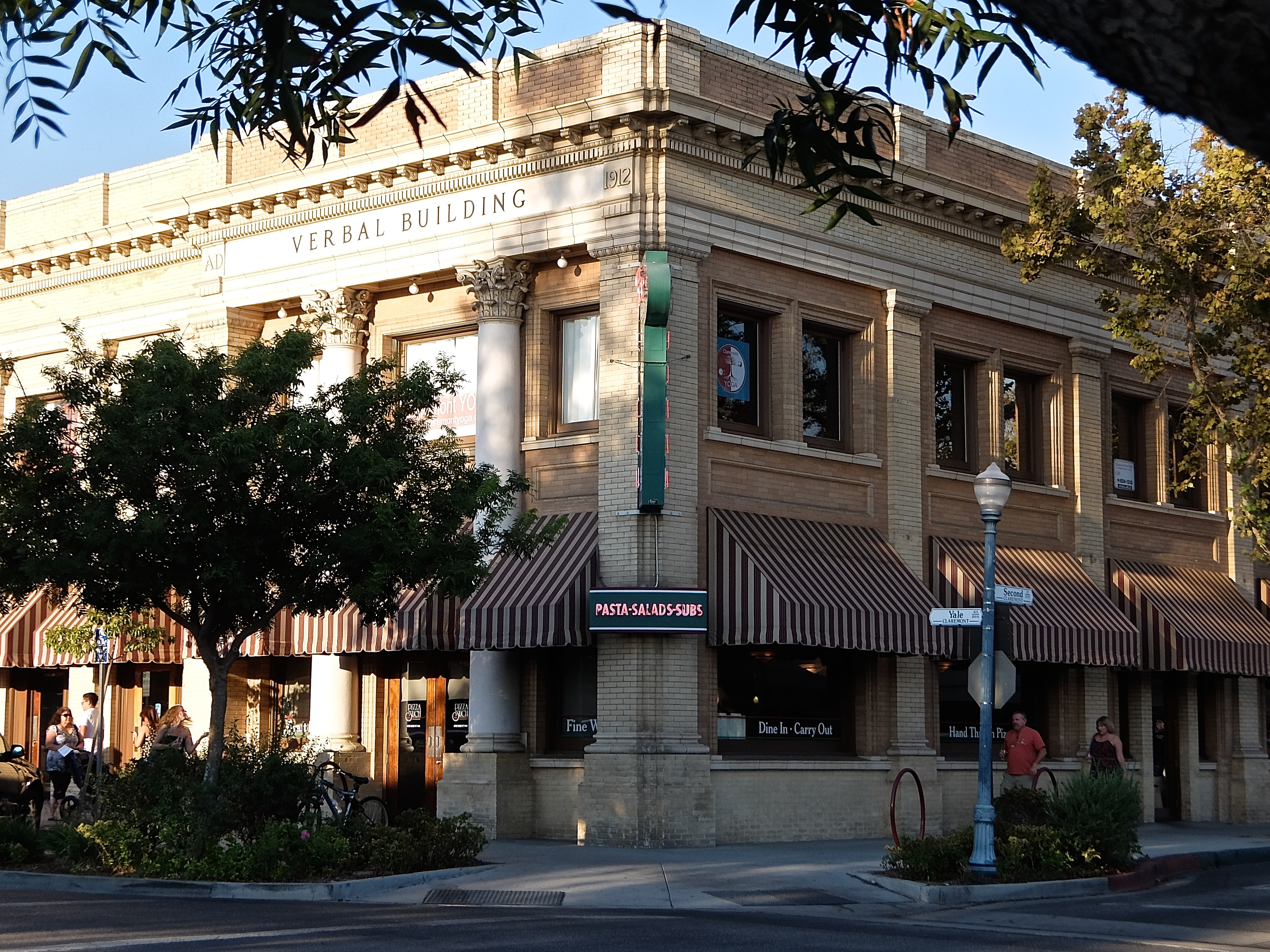
The Verbal Building in the Claremont Village, used today as a restaurant

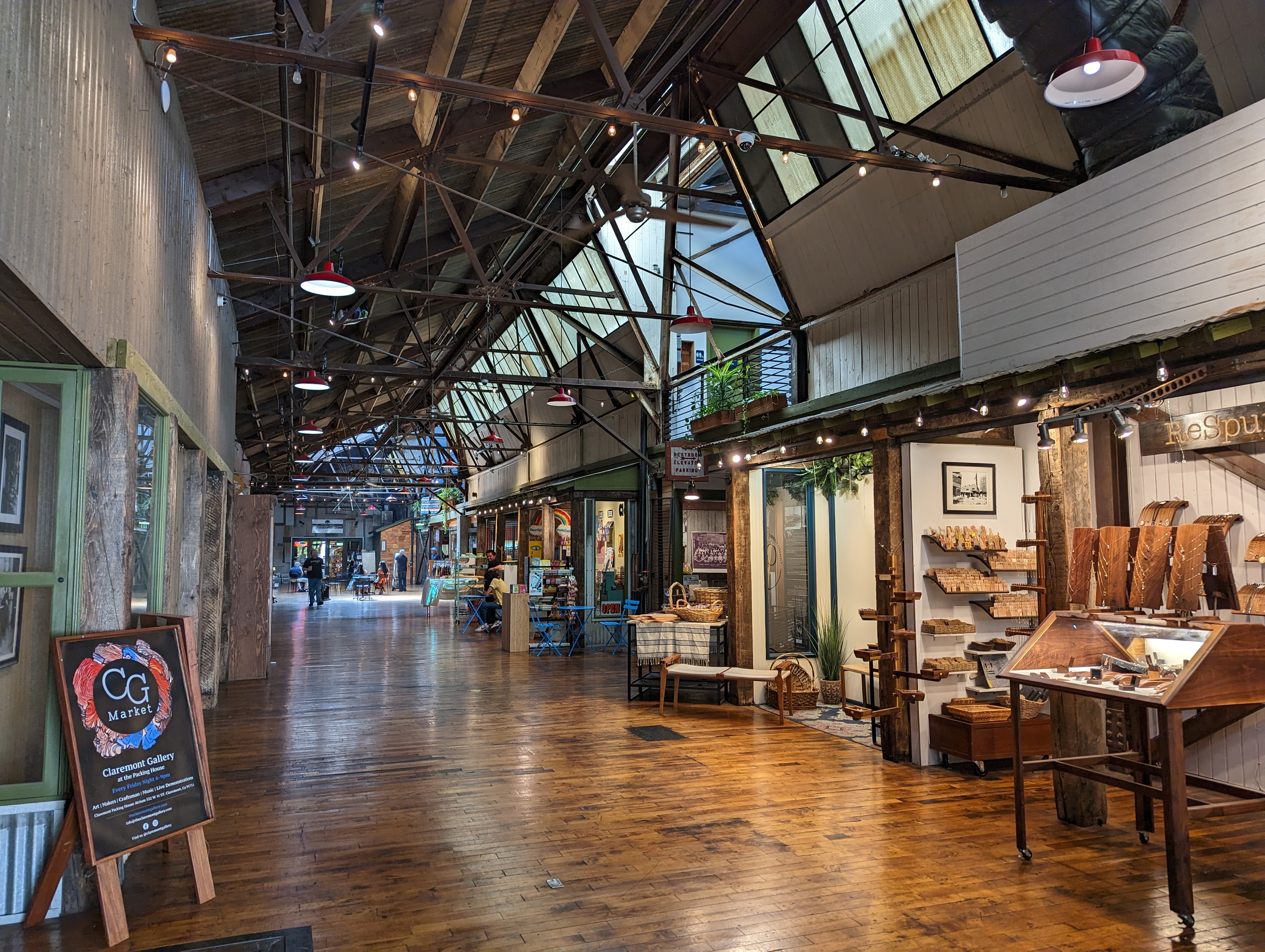
The Claremont Packing House, a former citrus packing facility now filled with shops

=== Top employers ===
According to the city's 2009 Comprehensive Annual Financial Report, the top employers in the city are:

#	Employer	# of employees
1	Claremont Colleges	3,000
2	Claremont Unified School District	750
3	HiRel Connectors	300
4	City of Claremont	259
5	Claremont Auto Center	240
6	Claremont Manor	230
7	Technip Energies	205
8	Pilgrim Place	180
9	Indian Hill Nursing	124
10	The Webb Schools	119

== Arts and culture ==
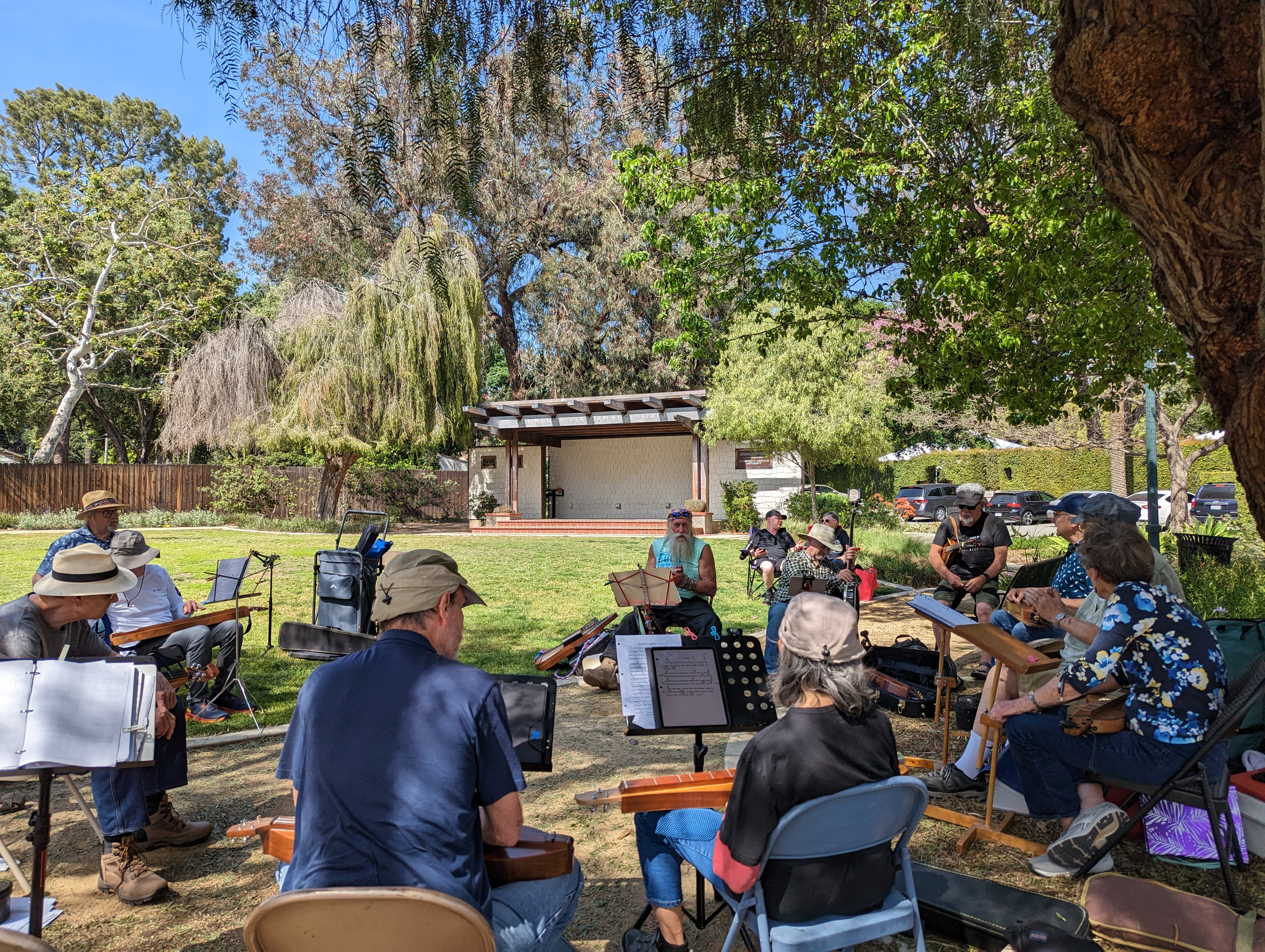
A mountain dulcimer jam in Shelton Park

Claremont has been praised for its vibrant arts and culture scene.

Each year, Claremont holds a springtime folk music festival, hosted by the Folk Music Center Store and Museum. The 35th event took place in May 2018.

Local museums include the Raymond M. Alf Museum of Paleontology at The Webb Schools (the only high school in the United States to own and host a nationally accredited museum on campus) and the Benton Museum of Art at Pomona College.

Each July, Ophelia's Jump Productions presents their annual Midsummer Shakespeare Festival at The Sontag Outdoor Theatre in Pomona College. Productions are performed in repertory with local community and civic events and festivities.

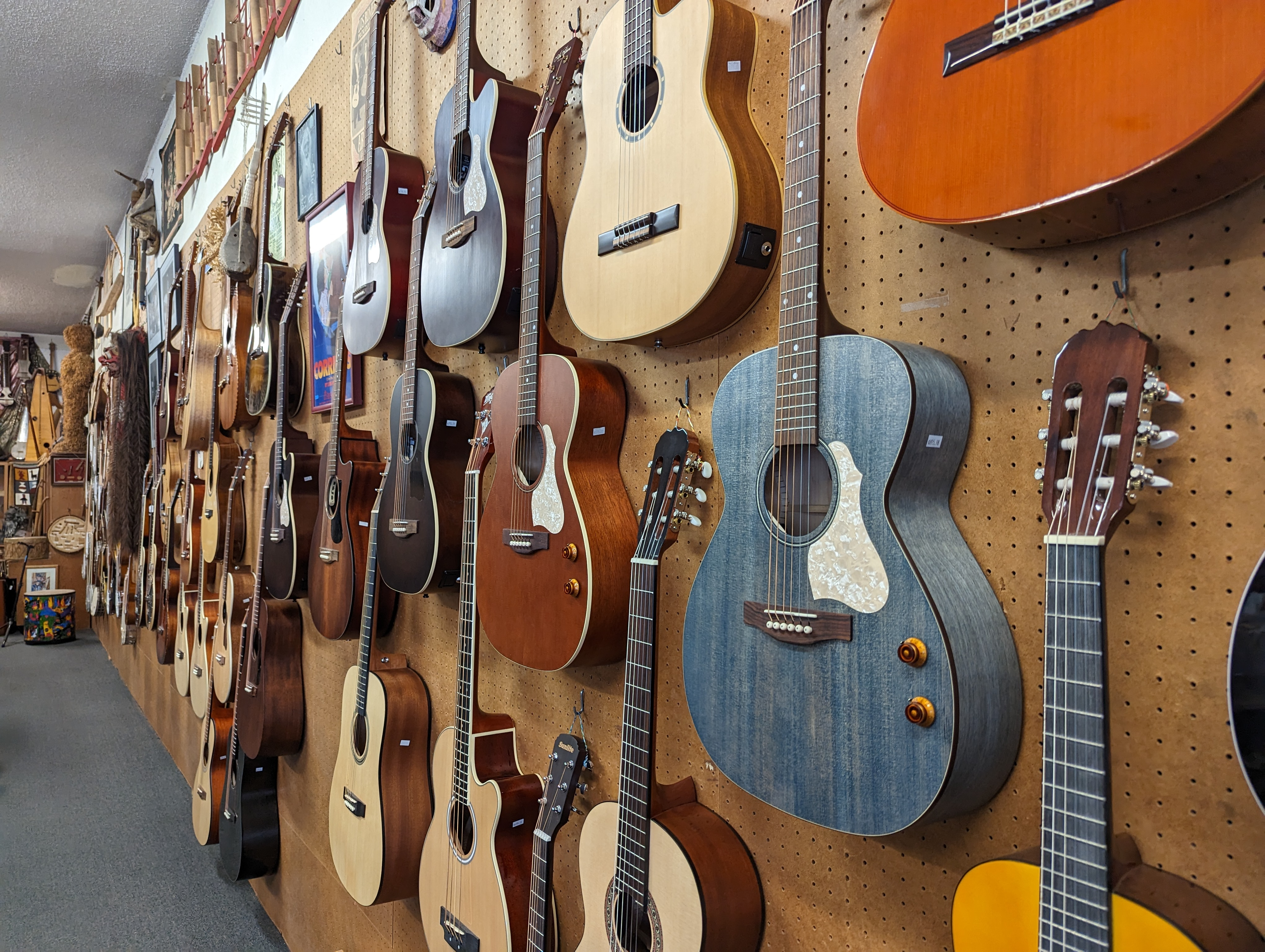
Guitars at the Claremont Folk Music Center

The Claremont Village hosts a Pie Day Festival every March 14. In past years, attendees could collect pie recipes as they walked around downtown Claremont and checked out different stores.

In 2019, Claremont made national news after the Claremont United Methodist Church unveiled a nativity scene depicting Joseph, Mary, and baby Jesus separated and locked up in individual chain-link pens. This was done to reflect the plight of immigrants and asylum seekers on the U.S. Southern Border in 2019. The church had constructed similarly non-traditional nativity scenes in prior years.

=== Points of interest ===
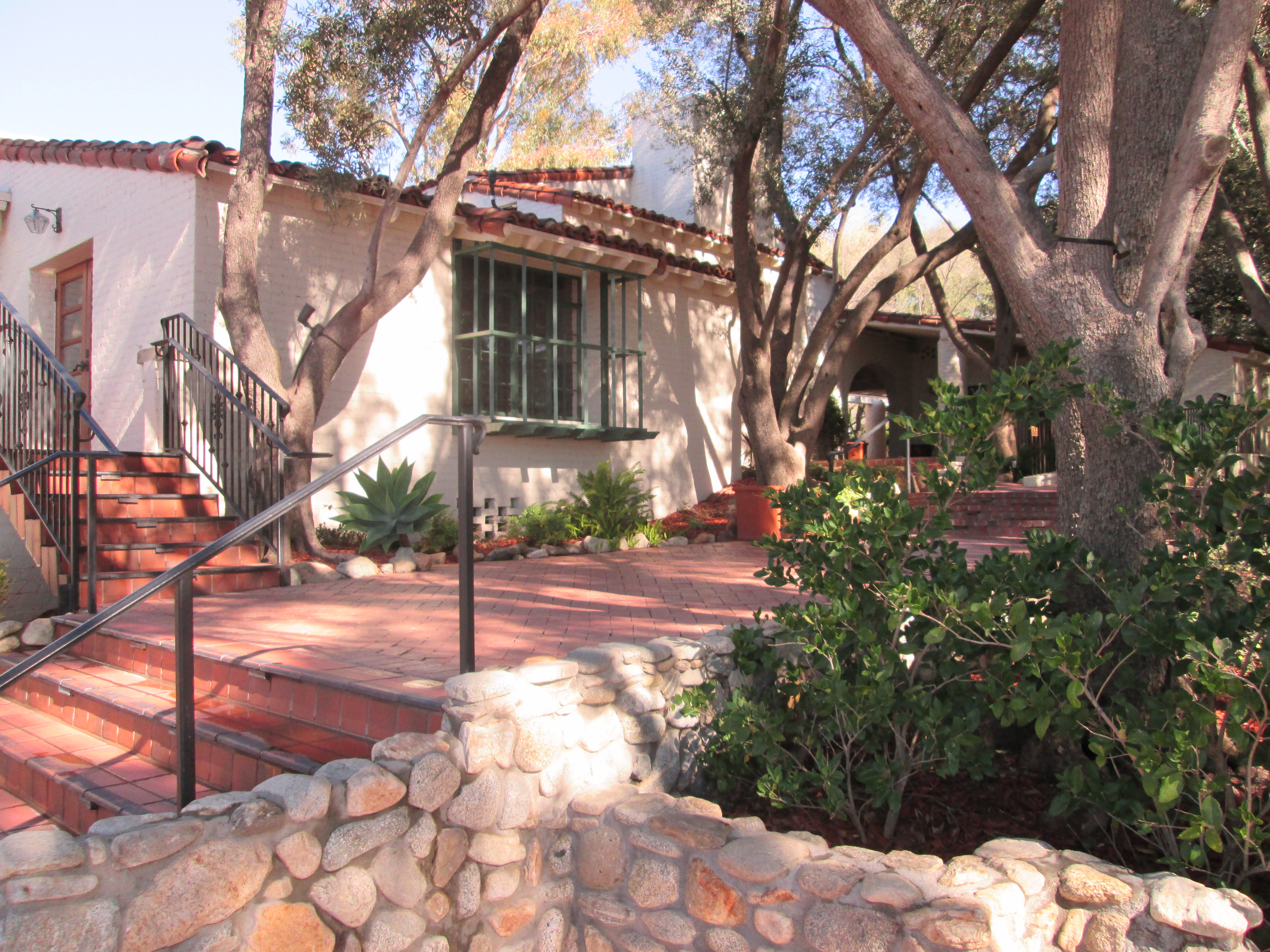
Padua Hills Theatre

- The Claremont Colleges
- The California Botanic Garden (formerly Rancho Santa Ana Botanic Garden) contains a very large and diverse collection of California native plants, and is open daily for self-guided walking tours.
- Padua Hills Theatre
- Folk Music Center Museum
- Claremont Museum of Art
- Ophelia's Jump Theater
- Benton Museum of Art, Pomona College

== Government ==
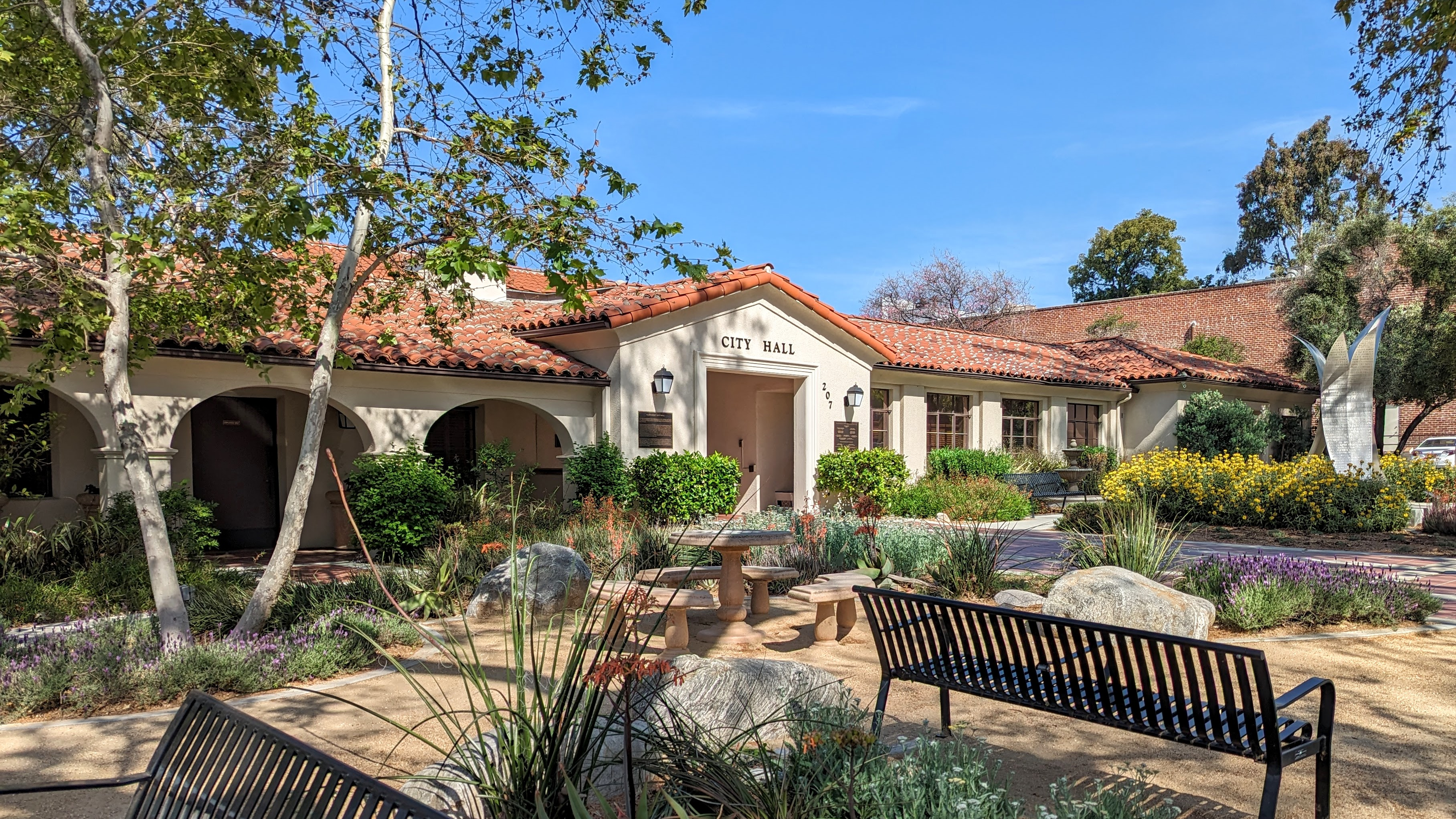
City Hall

In the Los Angeles County Board of Supervisors, Claremont is in the Fifth District, represented by Kathryn Barger.

In the California State Legislature, Claremont is in the 25th senatorial district, represented by Democrat Sasha Renée Pérez, and in the 41st Assembly district, represented by Democrat John Harabedian.

In the United States House of Representatives, Claremont is in California's 28th congressional district, represented by Democrat Judy Chu following 2022 redistricting. Claremont was previously represented by Republican David Dreier, who served from 1981 to 2013. Claremont was also represented by President Richard Nixon when he was a member of the House of Representatives from 1947 to 1950, prior to his becoming a United States senator.

== Education ==
=== Public schools ===
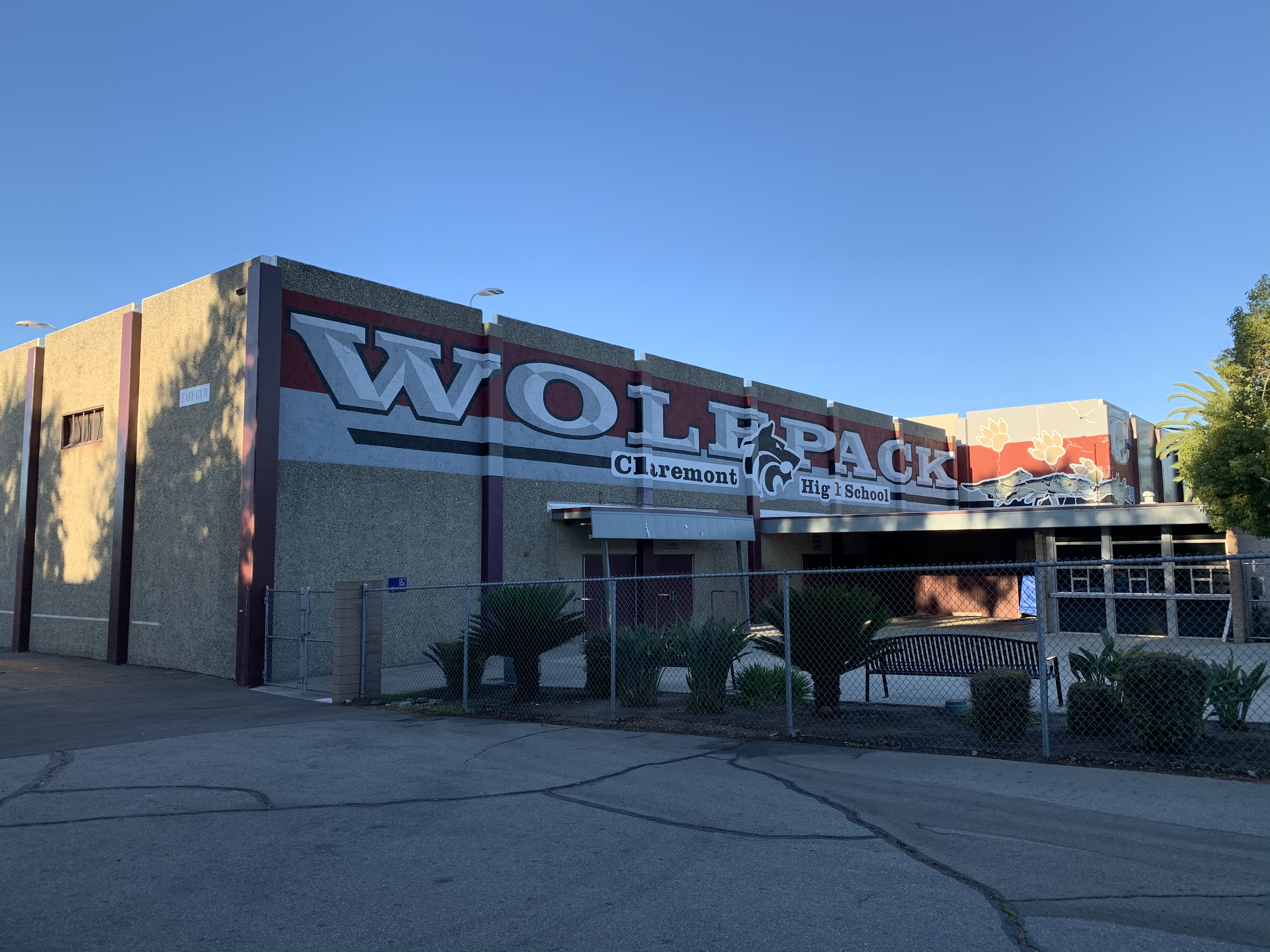
Claremont High School's gymnasium

Claremont's school district is known as the Claremont Unified School District (CUSD). It has seven elementary schools, one intermediate school, El Roble, one adult school and two high schools, Claremont High School (CHS) and San Antonio High School.

=== Private schools (non-tertiary) ===
The other high school in Claremont is The Webb Schools, a collective name for two private college preparatory schools for grades 9–12, founded by Thompson Webb in 1922. The two schools, officially the Webb School of California (boys' school) and the Vivian Webb School (girls' school), share the same campus in northwest Claremont. Within the campus is the Vivian Webb Chapel, which began initial construction in 1939. It was built by the founder for his wife, Vivian. The Kimberly Bell Tower was added to the chapel in 1955. The Webb Schools is also home to the Raymond M. Alf Museum of Paleontology, America's only accredited museum located on a high school campus.

=== Post-secondary ===
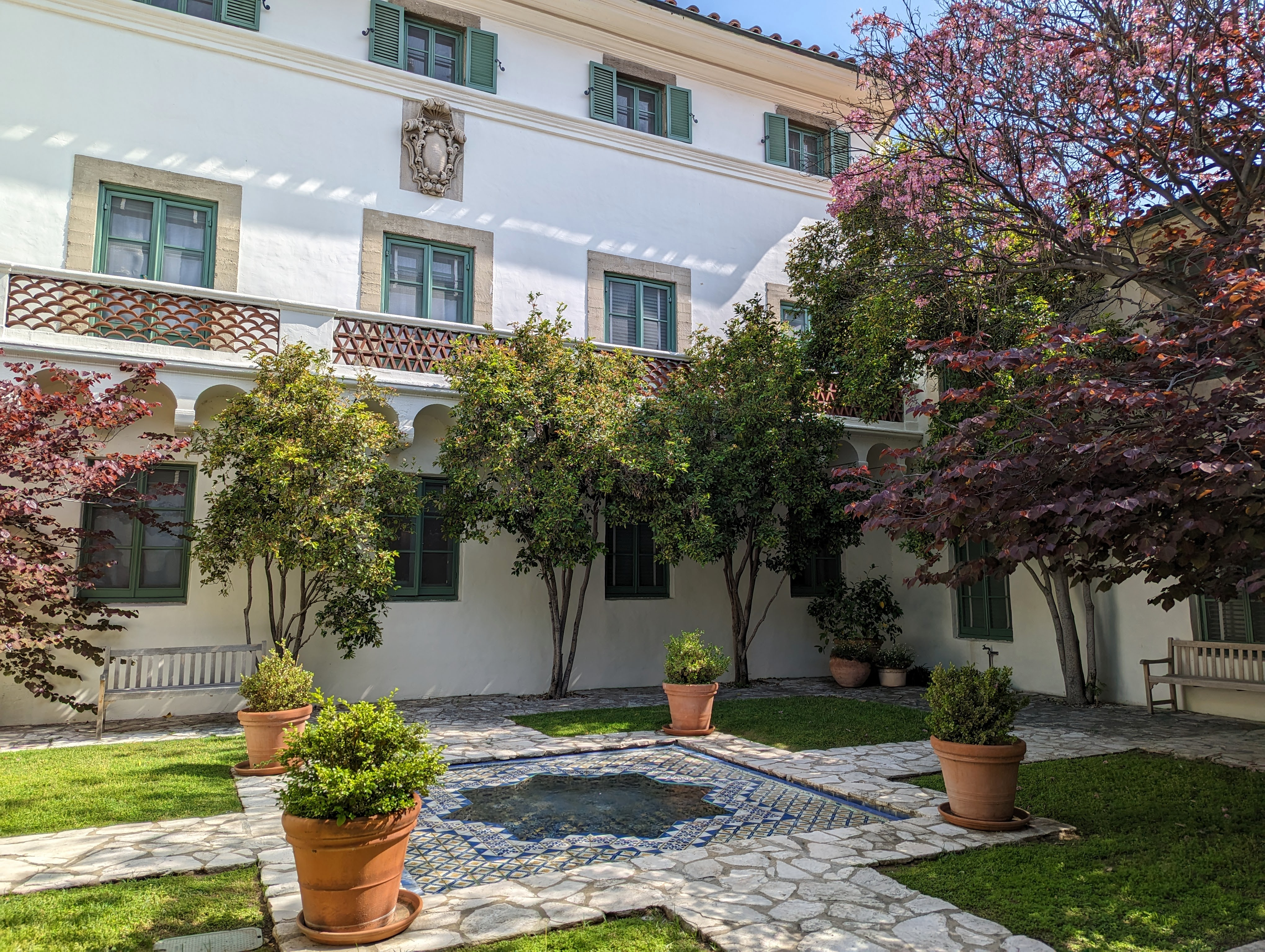
Courtyard in a dormitory at Scripps College, the women's college of the Claremont Colleges

Private educational institutions host approximately 6,500 students every year from across the country and around the world. The Claremont Colleges, a consortium of seven schools of higher education, include five undergraduate institutions—Pomona College (founded in 1887), Scripps College (1926), Claremont McKenna College (1946), Harvey Mudd College (1955), and Pitzer College (1963)—and two graduate institutions—Claremont Graduate University (1925) and the Keck Graduate Institute of Applied Life Sciences (1997). All of these schools are consistently rated among the best in the nation.

Just north of Foothill Boulevard is the college-owned Robert J. Bernard Field Station, which preserves natural coastal sage scrub on its property. Claremont Lincoln University shares some resources with the Claremont Colleges, but is a separate entity. After leaving the University of Southern California, the Claremont School of Theology moved to Claremont in 1957. After financial struggles and a transition to online education, the school attempted to sell part of its campus, prompting a dispute with the Claremont Colleges over the sale of the land. After an almost decade long legal battle, the Claremont School of Theology moved to Westwood Methodist Church in Los Angeles in 2023 and sold its campus to The Claremont Colleges Services in 2024.

== Media ==
The Claremont Courier is widely regarded as Claremont's newspaper of record. In 2018, the Courier was named the top community newspaper in California by the California News Publisher's Association. In addition, Claremont High School's students produce the student newspaper The Wolfpacket, with support and printing services from the Courier.

There are also several media outlets based at the Claremont Colleges, including The Student Life, the oldest college newspaper in Southern California, and the radio station KSPC.

== Infrastructure ==
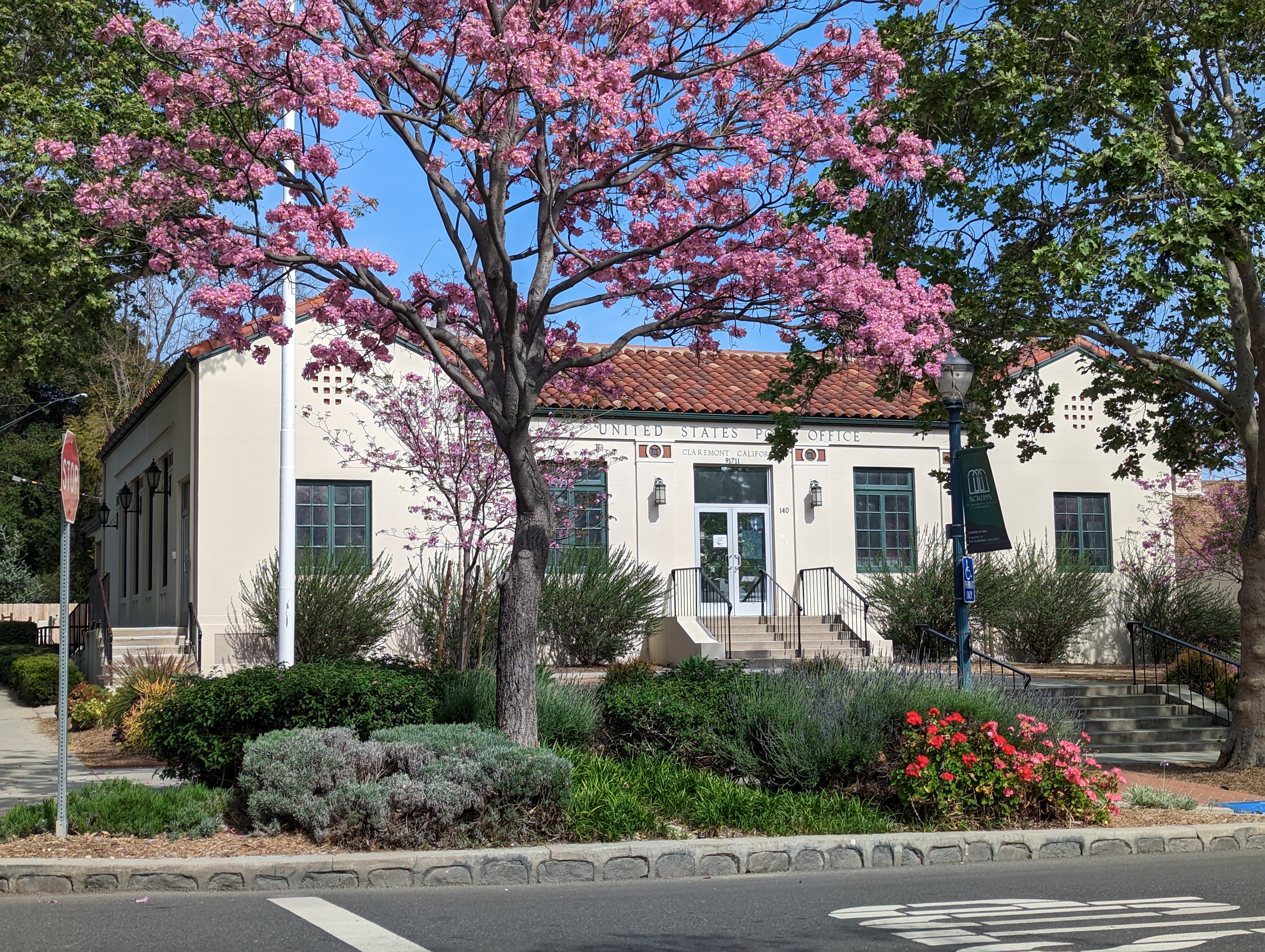
Post office

=== Transportation ===
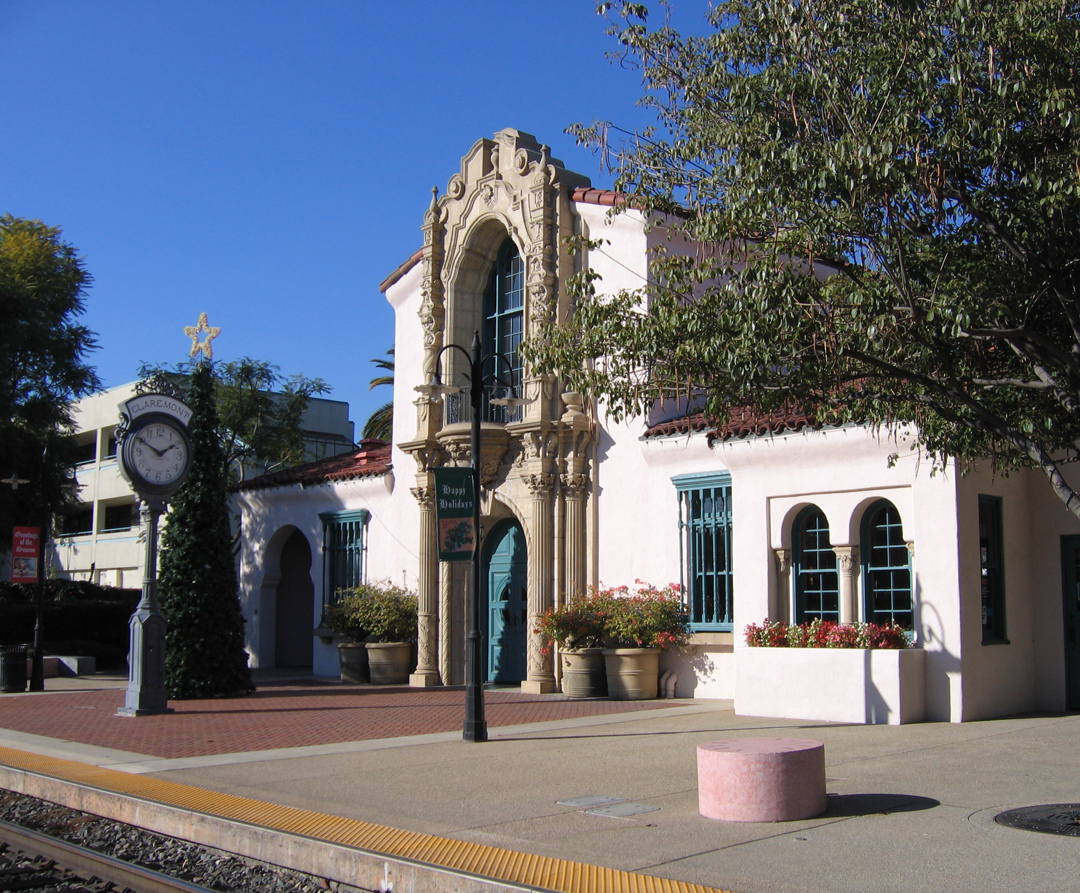
Former train depot, now an art museum

Commuter train service to Claremont is provided by Metrolink from the Claremont Metrolink Station. The station is on the San Bernardino Line, with trains traveling to Los Angeles Union Station (west) and San Bernardino – Downtown (east) 19 times on weekdays (20 on Fridays), 10 times on Saturdays, and seven times on Sundays. Claremont's train station is known as the Claremont Depot.

Claremont is also planned to eventually connect with the Metro A Line on the Foothill Extension Project, funded in 2024 and planned for completion in 2030. This extension will also provide service to L.A. Union Station via Pasadena.

FlixBus utilizes a stop adjacent to the Claremont Metrolink Station.

The local transit bus service Foothill Transit covers Claremont and several other cities in the eastern San Gabriel Valley.

== Notable people ==
- Jessica Alba – actress
- Matthew Arias – musician and film editor
- Richard Armour – writer, English professor
- Tony Beltran – soccer player
- Arthur T. Benjamin – mathematician
- Karl Benjamin – artist
- Jacob Bertrand – actor
- Amanda Blake – actress
- Julian Bravo – soccer player
- Brittany Brown – Olympic sprinter
- Buckethead – musician
- Robert Buckley – actor
- Kori Carter – hurdler
- John B. Cobb – theologian, philosopher, and environmentalist
- Ray Collins – musician
- John Darnielle – musician and novelist
- Glenn Davis – football player
- David Dreier – former member of the U.S. House of Representatives (1981–2013) and chairman of the House Rules Committee (1999–2007, 2011–2013)
- Peter F. Drucker – management consultant, educator and author
- Bob Earl – racing driver
- B. H. Fairchild – poet and college professor
- Justin Germano – baseball pitcher
- Elliot Graham – film editor and producer
- Ben Harper – musician and humanitarian
- Alex Hinshaw – baseball pitcher
- Raja Kumari – rapper
- Maud Hart Lovelace – author
- Sam Quinones – journalist and author
- Dileep Rao – actor
- Kristin Rossum – murderer
- Millard Sheets – artist and designer
- Paul Soldner – artist
- Noah Song – professional baseball pitcher
- Ruth Suckow – author
- David Foster Wallace – author and professor
- Carleton H. Wright – United States Navy admiral
- Frank Zappa – musician
