= Craig Colclough =

American opera singer

Craig Colclough is an internationally acclaimed American operatic bass-baritone. Initially trained as a cellist, Colclough started acting in musical theater and comedic improv in high school. Colclough attended the Johnston Center at the University of Redlands, in Redlands, California, where he earned an integrative liberal arts degree followed by a Masters of Music through the University of Redlands Conservatory of Music. Colclough began his career at the Los Angeles Opera.

== Career ==
Colclough completed tenures as both a Florida Grand Opera Young Artist and Filene Young Artist at the Wolf Trap Opera Company in 2013.

The title role in Giuseppe Verdi’s Macbeth has served as Colclough’s debut at the Metropolitan Opera, Lyric Opera of Chicago, Bayerische Staatsoper and the Grand Théâtre de Luxembourg.Colclough’s Macbeth at the Lyric Opera of Chicago was the company's first production following an 18-month hiatus during the COVID-19 pandemic.

Throughout his career Colclough has appeared most often at the Los Angeles Opera. Notably as Figaro in The Marriage of Figaro and Peter in Hansel and Gretel.

Additional significant appearances include Telramund in Wagner’s Lohengrin at the Royal Opera House Covent Gardens, Scarpia in Tosca with the Canadian Opera Company and English National Opera, Storyteller in A Flowering Tree with Opera Queensland Australia, Kurwenal in Tristan und Isolde at the English National Opera, the title role in Don Pasquale at the Minnesota Opera, Arizona Opera and Berkshire Opera Festival and Falstaff at Opera Ballet Vlaanderen directed by Christoph Waltz.

Colclough's European debut was with the English National Opera as Jack Rance in La fanciulla del West in 2014–2015.

Musical theatre credits include Mr. Lindquist in A Little Night Music at the Riverside Light Opera as well as the title character in Stephen Sondheim’s Sweeney Todd at Opera Saratoga starring alongside Carolee Carmello.
