= Bob McCutcheon =

Scottish author and historian

- McCutcheon in his bookstore in 1999
- Born: 21 October 1939
- Died: 31 August 2002 (aged 62)
- Occupations: Author, historian, publisher
- Spouse: Barbara
- Writing career
- Years active: 1960s–2000

Robert McCutcheon (21 October 1939 – 31 August 2002) was an author, publisher and historian from Stirling, Scotland. He wrote and had published several books on the history of Stirling, including Notes for a New History of Stirling (1985), Stirling's Neebour Villages (1986) and Pictures from the Past (1989). In 1986, he wrote a history of Stirling which was published in the Stirling Observer for its 150th anniversary.

He was also a book dealer, and owned an antiquarian bookshop.

== Career ==
Known as "an oracle for the history of Stirling", McCutcheon opened an antiquarian bookshop in the city in the 1960s. Its first location was in the Craigs, then in Spittal Street and, finally, at 55 Baker Street. In July 1999, he was interviewed in its final location, The Bookshop, for A Stirling Performance, a documentary which followed the city's preparation for R.E.M.'s three-night stand at Stirling Castle. The documentary was included on the band's 2004 DVD Perfect Square. "My interest in music tended to stop when Buddy Holly and the Big Bopper were killed. And when Eddie Cochran went, that was it; I'm strictly kind of a '50s person." He also noted that shows at the castle adversely affected businesses such as his because locals tend to "shy away" from the top of the town, the area near the castle, and shop in the city centre or outlying areas. "People going to a pop concert, even if they've got an interest, are not going to come in to buy a book and then carry it to the concert with them."

The shops included local memorabilia, prints, paintings, rare chapbooks and a bust of Sir Walter Scott. He also loaned items, including photographs, from his personal collection to local museums and historical societies. The photographs were sourced from publications such as Vues Pittoresques de l'Ecosse (F. A. Pernot), 1827; Pictorial History of Scotland (James Taylor), 1859; Border Antiquities of England and Scotland (Walter Scott), 1814; and Scotland Illustrated (Dr William Beattie, T. Alcom, W. H. Bartlett and H. McCulloch), 1838.

=== Selected bibliography ===
- Notes for a New History of Stirling (1985)
- Stirling's Neebour Villages (1986)
- Stirling (1986)
- Pictures from the Past (1989)
- Tempus 2000 (2000)

== Personal life ==
McCutcheon was born on 21 October 1939. He traced his family back to the 17th century in the Bannockburn area of Stirling. A maternal ancestor, a blacksmith, had premises near the Borestone and would hire out a hammer and chisel to tourists to break off parts of the boulder to have as keepsakes.

He was married to Barbara, who sought out stock for the bookshop. The couple, who lived in Bannockburn, became historical advisers for several exhibitions that took place at the Stirling Smith Art Gallery and Museum.

McCutcheon retired due to ill health in 2000.

== Death ==
McCutcheon died on 31 August 2002, aged 62. He was interred in Stirling's Bannockburn Cemetery. A year after his death, a 1930s tricycle which McCutcheon had restored was gifted to the Stirling Smith Art Gallery and Museum by his widow. The trike had been used by the Stirling's Cosy End Cafe, which was owned by the Giannandrea family, who used it to deliver ice-cream throughout the city during the summer seasons.

=== Legacy ===
In 2004, historian David R. Ross dedicated his book Desire Lines to McCutcheon:

But most of all I humbly dedicate this book to the late Bob McCutcheon, historian of Stirling, who helped me in my early quests, and to whom, due to my own shortcomings, I never got to say cheerio.

— David R. Ross, Desire Lines, Acknowledgements

Ross died six years after McCutcheon, from a heart attack. He was 51.
