= Chino Valley Unified School District =

Chino Valley Unified School District or Chino Valley School District may refer to:

- Chino Valley Unified School District (California)
- Chino Valley Unified School District (Arizona)
