= La Casa Alvarado =

Historic house in California, United States

- U.S. National Register of Historic Places
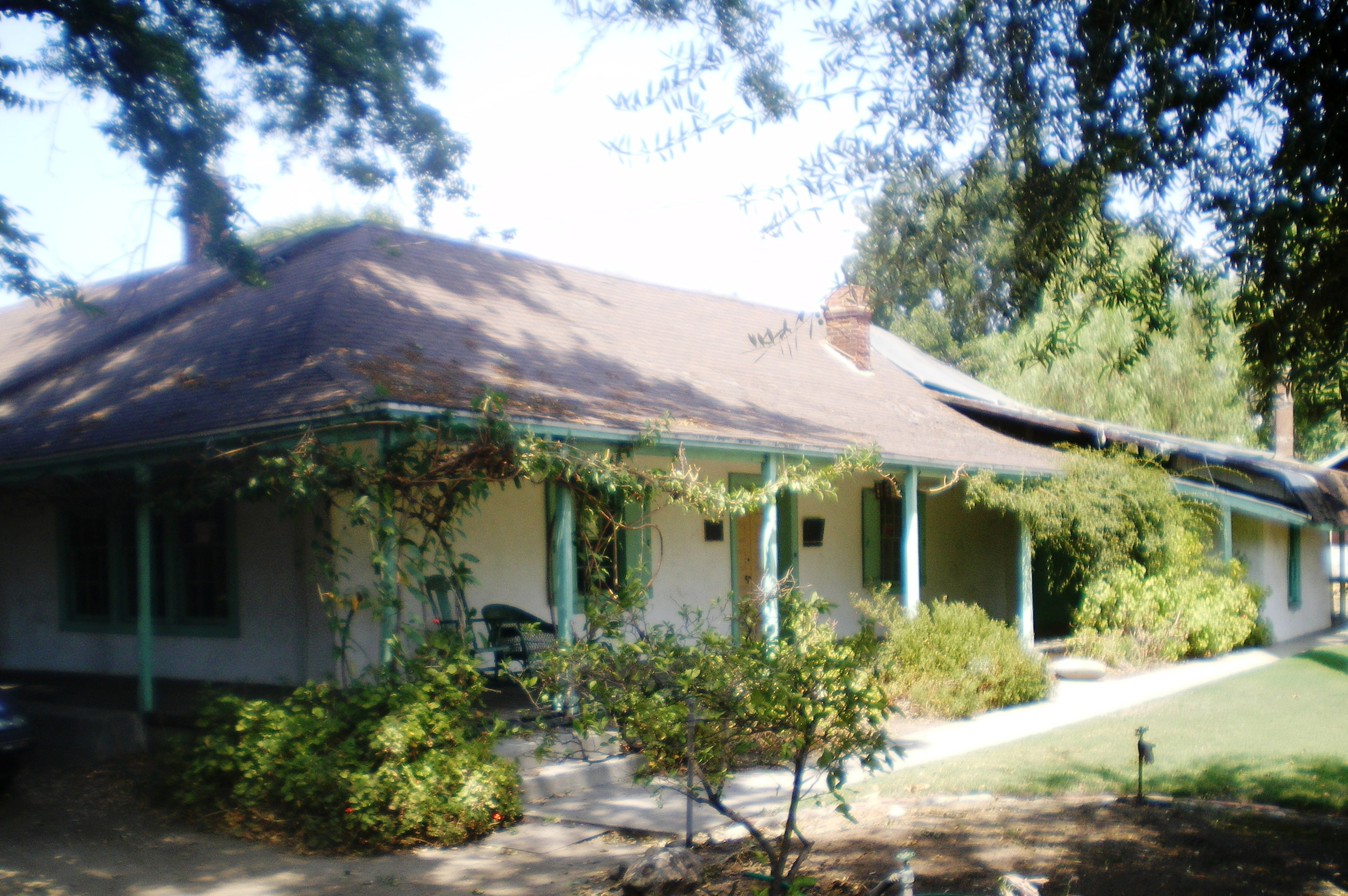
- La Casa Alvarado, August 2008

- Location within the Los Angeles metropolitan area Location within California Location within the United States
- Location: 1459 Old Settlers Lane, Pomona, California
- Coordinates: 34°4′26″N 117°45′19″W
- Area: 0.8 acres (0.32 ha)
- Built: 1840
- Architectural style: Mexican adobe
- NRHP reference No.: 78000698
- Added to NRHP: April 4, 1978

La Casa Alvarado, also known as the Alvarado Adobe, is a historic adobe structure built in 1840 and located on Old Settlers Lane in Pomona, California. It was declared a historic landmark in 1954 and added to the National Register of Historic Places in 1978.

== History ==
The Casa Alvarado is located on a portion of the 22,000-acre (8,900 ha) Rancho San Jose granted to Ygnacio Palomares and Ricardo Vejas in 1837. In 1840, Palomares invited his close friend, Ygnacio Alvarado, to live on the ranch and gave him a plot of land near Palomares' own home, La Casa Primera de Rancho San Jose. The land was given to Alvarado with the stipulation that Alvarado would build a chapel in his home to be used for church services when padres visited from the Mission San Gabriel Arcángel. The large 18-foot (5.5 m) by 42-foot (13 m) living room (or "sala") of the Casa Alvarado was used for church services for 45 years. The Alvarado's adobe living room was also the site of the first public school classes in the Pomona Valley, starting in 1870 or 1871.

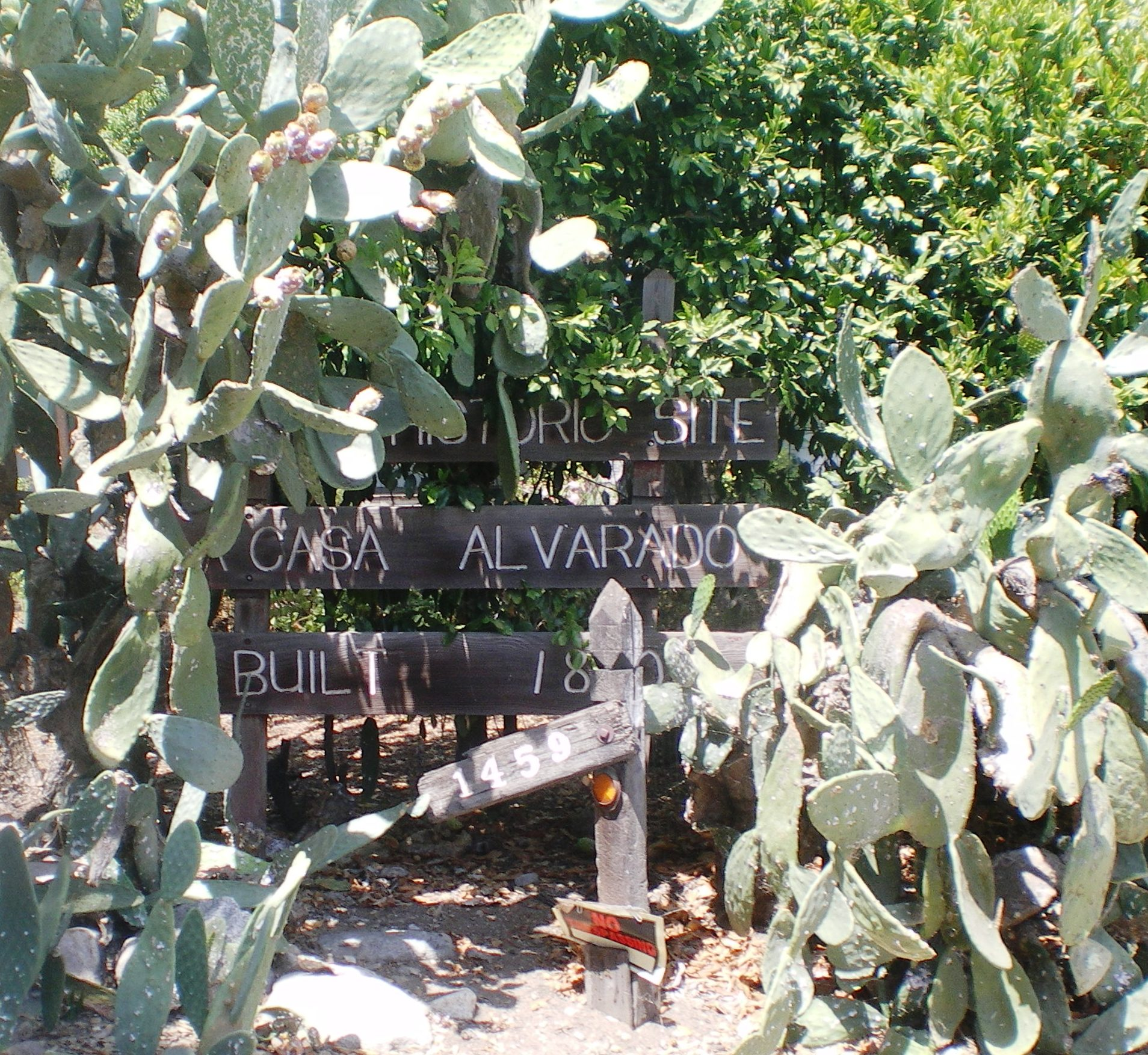
Sign marking La Casa Alvarado

For more than 120 years, the house had only three owners. It remained in the Alvardo family from 1840 to 1886, when it was purchased and occupied by Dr. Benjamin S. Nichols and his family. Prior to 1900, Dr. Nichols added redwood frame additions to the house; of the 14 rooms in the house, five are part of the original adobe. The house remained in the Nichols family for 65 years.

In 1951, Alphonse and Isabel Fages purchased the home. Alphonse was born in Pomona and a descendant of Ricardo Vejar, who in 1837 was the co-grantee of the Rancho San Jose along with Ygnacio Palomares. Isabel was also the descendant of Spanish settlers and had served as the president of the Historical Society of Pomona Valley and the editor of the official publication of the Native Sons and Daughters of the Golden West. The Fages bought the adobe with plans to restore and preserve it. The house originally included two-and-a-half acres of land, but the Fages sold several lots reducing it to approximately one acre.

== Historic designation ==
In 1954, the Native Daughters of the Golden West declared the Casa Alvarado to be a historic landmark and dedicated a historical marker on the site. The site was added to the National Register of Historic Places in 1978. Though designated as a historic site, the Casa Alvarado remains a private home and is not open to the public. It is currently for sale (November 2009).

== See also ==
- List of Registered Historic Places in Los Angeles County, California
- Rancho San Jose
- Ygnacio Palomares Adobe
- La Casa Primera de Rancho San Jose
