= Maria Concepcion Lopez de Palomares =

Maria Concepcion de Palomares

Maria Concepcion Lopez de Palomares, or "Dona China" as she is referred to at the Palomares Adobe, is often linked to her marriage to Ygnacio Maria Palomares (died 1864).

== Property and marriage ==
According to a hand written marriage certificate, on May 26 in 1832, Concepcion and Ygnacio Palomares were married in the San Gabriel Mission. Rancho San Jose was granted to Ygnacio Palomares and Ricardo Vejar in 1837 by Governor Juan B. Alvarado. The Palomares couple lived in an adobe house after its build was finished in 1854 and it is known as (Ygnacio) Palomares Adobe. After his death, Ygnacio planned to leave what is known as La Casa Primera to his son Francisco Palomares and as for the Palomares Adobe house and remaining property were to be left to his wife, Concepcion; which, soon after his death in 1864 she later abandoned the property allowing for the wisteria to grow out of control resulting in a portion of the roof to completely cave in. The building was restored in 1939 and finally was registered as a historical landmark on April 21, 1941.

Concepcion Palomares was in charge of the botanicals on the Palomares property, growing different plants, trees, and crops as a means for food and medicine.
