= La Casa de Carrión =

- Location within the Los Angeles metropolitan area
- 34°05′47″N 117°47′19″W
- Location: La Verne, California

History
- Built: 1839

California Historical Landmark
- Designated: Dec. 14 1945
- Reference no.: 386

La Casa de Carrión is an Adobe home built in 1868 by Saturnino Carrión (27 Nov 1831 – 25 Jun 1868). It is currently located in La Verne, California. The La Casa de Carrión was designated a California Historic Landmark (No. 386) on Dec. 14 1945. When La Casa de Carrión was built it was on the Rancho San Jose land. The Casa de Carrion the land was owned by Carrion's uncle Ygnacio Palomares and his business partner Ricardo Vejar. Ygnacio Palomares had built his own home, Ygnacio Palomares Adobe, near by in what is now Pomona, California in 1855. The land of Casa de Carrion was gifted to Saturnino Carrión by Ygnacio_Palomares. The adobe home was built in a "L" shape with the front of the house facing north. Saturnino Carrión, his wife, Dolores (b. 11 Aug 1843 in Santa Barbara), and their three sons moved into La Casa de Carrión at completion. The three sons were: Ramon del Refugio (b. 4 Jul 1865), Julian (b. 5 Nov 1866) and Frank. Saturnino and Dolores married on 15 May 1865 at the Plaza Church in Pueblo Los Angeles. Born at La Casa de Carrión to Saturnino and Dolores were daughters: Josefa, Agatha and Louise. Saturnino Carrión raise livestock on his ranch at La Casa de Carrión. Saturnino Carrión grew up in the City of Los Angeles, the only child of Casiano Carrión and Josefa (Lopez) Carrión. Julian continued to run the ranch after his father died.

Carrion's uncle Ygnacio Palomares was elected the last Mexican California mayor of Los Angeles in 1848, but held the position briefly due to Colonel Jonathan Stevenson considering him intolerable and anti-American, following the Treaty of Guadalupe Hidalgo on February 2, 1848.

The Rancho San Jose consisted of land taken from the Mission San Gabriel in 1834 as part of the Mexican government's secularization decree of 1833. In 1837, Mexican Governor Juan Bautista Alvarado granted the land to Ygnacio Palomares and Ricardo Vejar, both Californio sons of New Spain natives. The Rancho San Jose operated by Dons Palomares and Vejar covered land that now forms the communities of Pomona, LaVerne, San Dimas, Diamond Bar, Azusa, Covina, Walnut, Glendora, and Claremont.

In 1887 La Casa de Carrión became part of the new town call Lordsburg, named after the new owner, Isaac W. Lord, of the land around the ranch. The house is still a private residence in La Verne, California. Paul E. Traweek restored the old home in 1951.

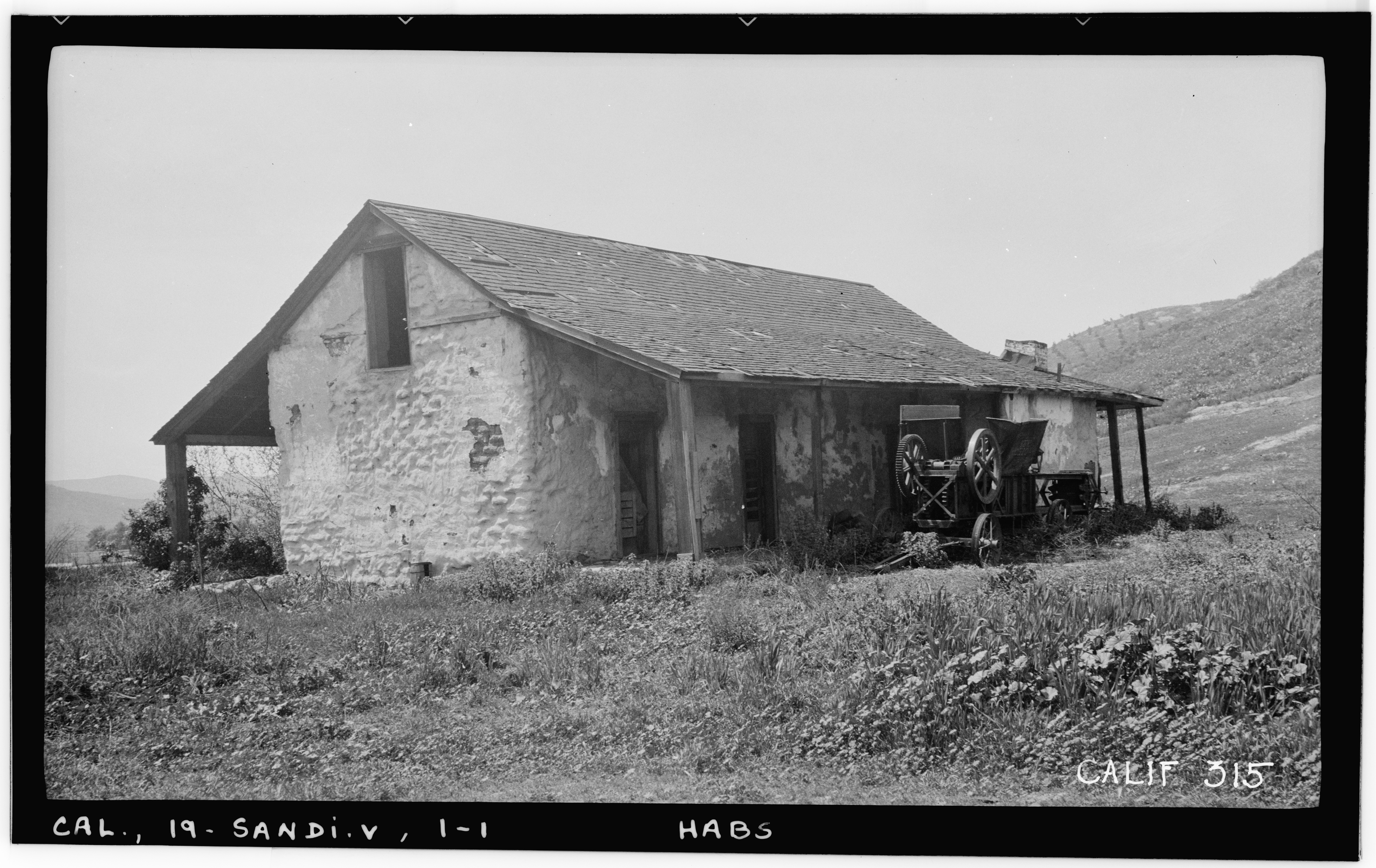
November 1934

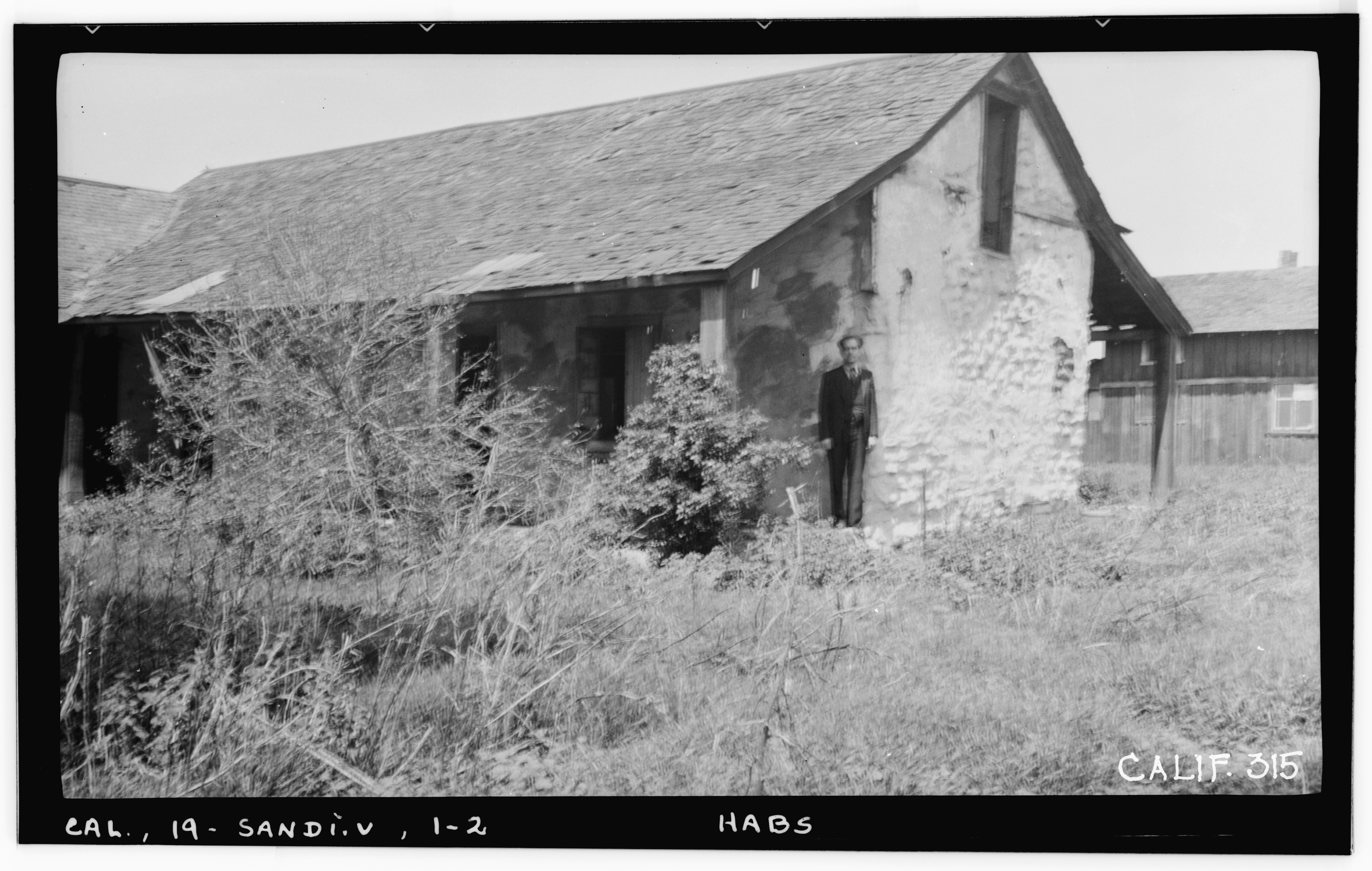
November 1934

== Marker ==
The state marker reads:

- This house, built in 1868 by Saturnio Carrion, was restored in 1951 by Paul E. Traweek.

== See also ==
- California Historical Landmarks in Los Angeles County
- List of California Ranchos
- Ranchos of Los Angeles County, California
