= La Verne, California =

City in California, United States

- City
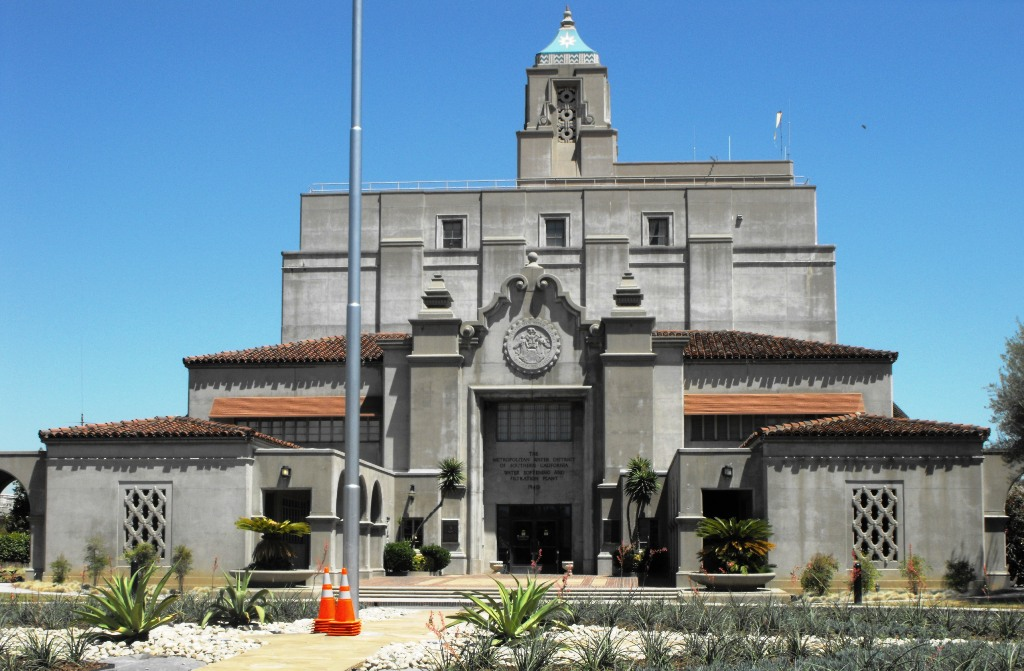
- Weymouth Treatment Plant

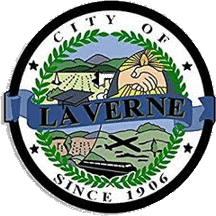
- Seal
- Interactive map of La Verne, California
- Location in the United States
- Coordinates: 34°6′52″N 117°46′17″W
- Country: United States
- State: California
- County: Los Angeles
- Incorporated: August 20, 1906

Government
  - Type: Council-Manager government
  - Mayor: Tim Hepburn
  - Mayor Pro Tem: Meshal "Kash" Kashifalghita
  - City Council: Steven F. Johnson; Rick Crosby; Wendy M. Lau

Area
  - Total: 8.53 sq mi (22.10 km^{2})
  - Land: 8.42 sq mi (21.81 km^{2})
  - Water: 0.11 sq mi (0.29 km^{2}) 1.30%
- Elevation: 1,060 ft (323 m)

Population (2020)
  - Total: 31,334
  - Density: 3,791/sq mi (1,463.9/km^{2})
- Time zone: UTC-8 (PST)
  - Summer (DST): UTC-7 (PDT)
- ZIP code: 91750
- Area code: 909
- FIPS code: 06-40830
- GNIS feature IDs: 1660868, 2411584
- Website: www.laverneca.gov

La Verne is a suburban city in the San Gabriel Valley of Los Angeles County, California, United States. The population was 31,334 at the 2020 census.

== History ==
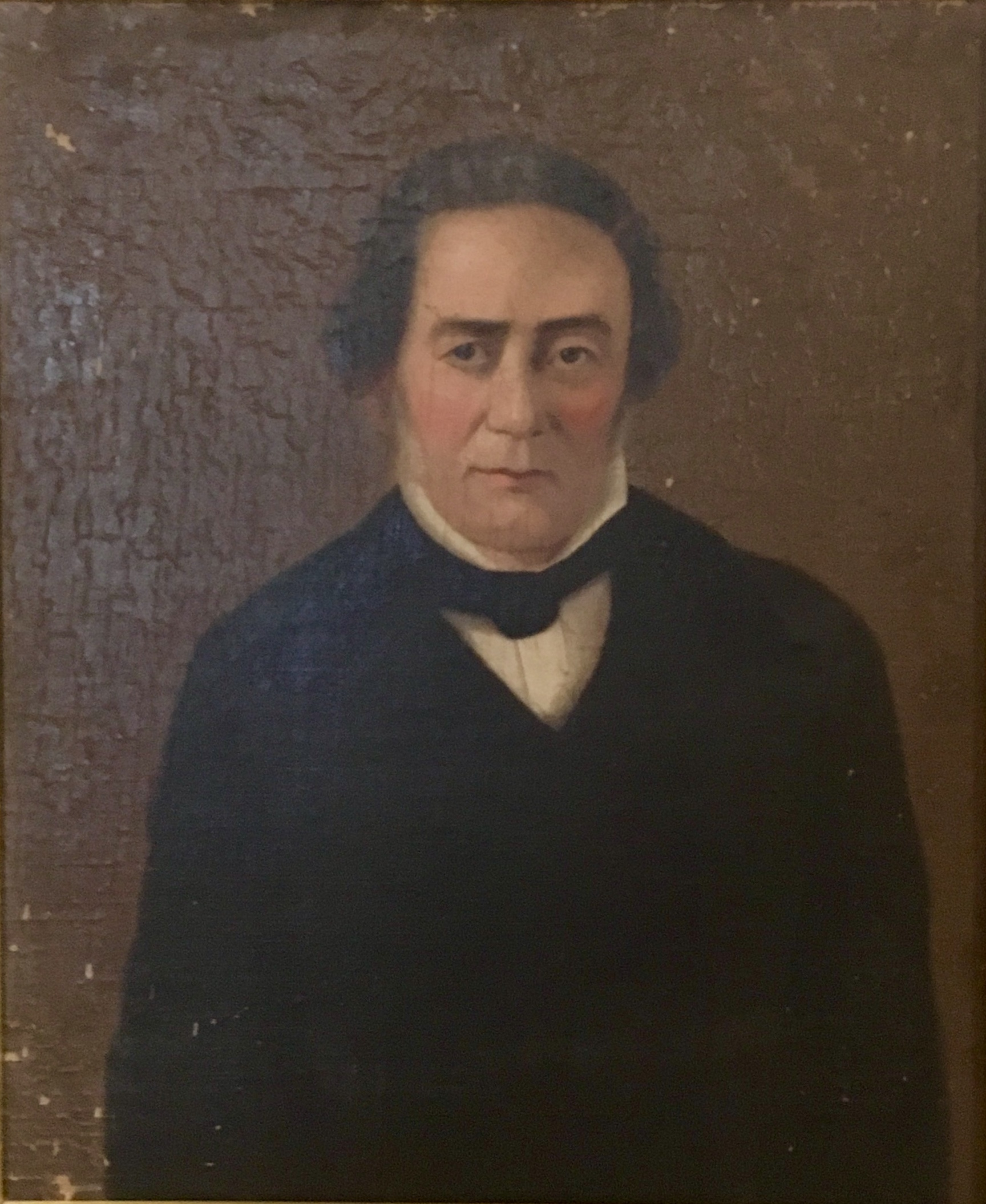
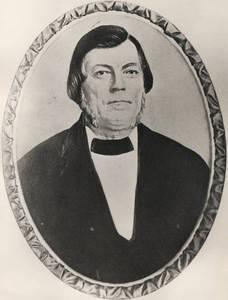
Rancho San José was granted in 1837 to Californio rancheros Ygnacio Palomares (left) and Ricardo Véjar (right), encompassing all of La Verne.

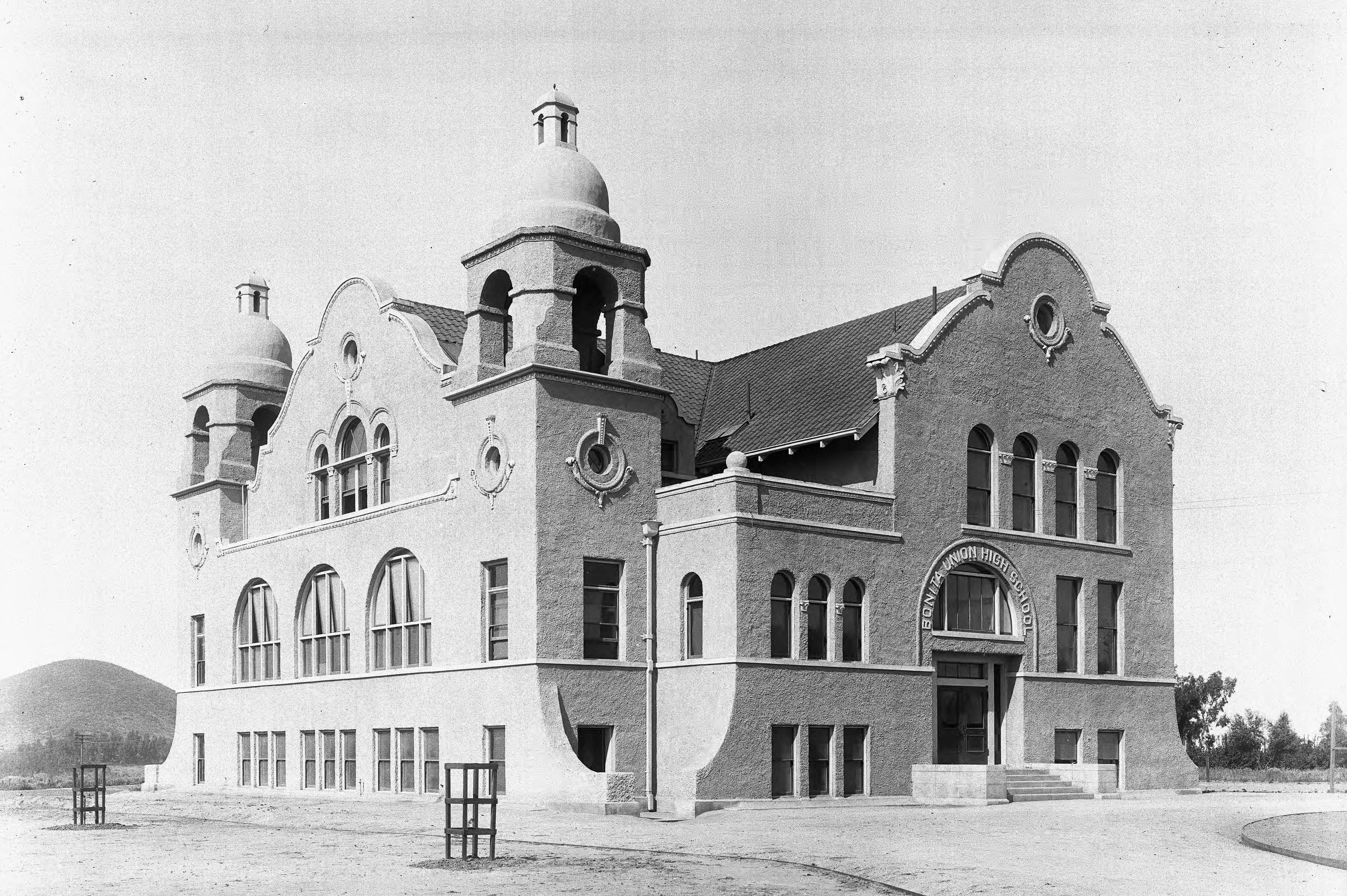
Bonita High School, c. 1900.

The area was home to Native Americans.

The European history of the area dates back to the 1830s when Ygnacio Palomares and Ricardo Véjar received the 15,000-acre (61 km^{2}) Rancho San Jose land grant from Governor Juan Bautista Alvarado in 1837. The land included the present day cities Pomona, Claremont, San Dimas, Glendora, and La Verne. The adobe that Palomares built in 1837 is still preserved in Pomona as La Casa Primera de Rancho San Jose (The First House). Palomares soon moved a mile or so northeast and constructed the Ygnacio Palomares Adobe. He ensured that a nephew, Jose Dolores Palomares, secured a tract of land a mile west.

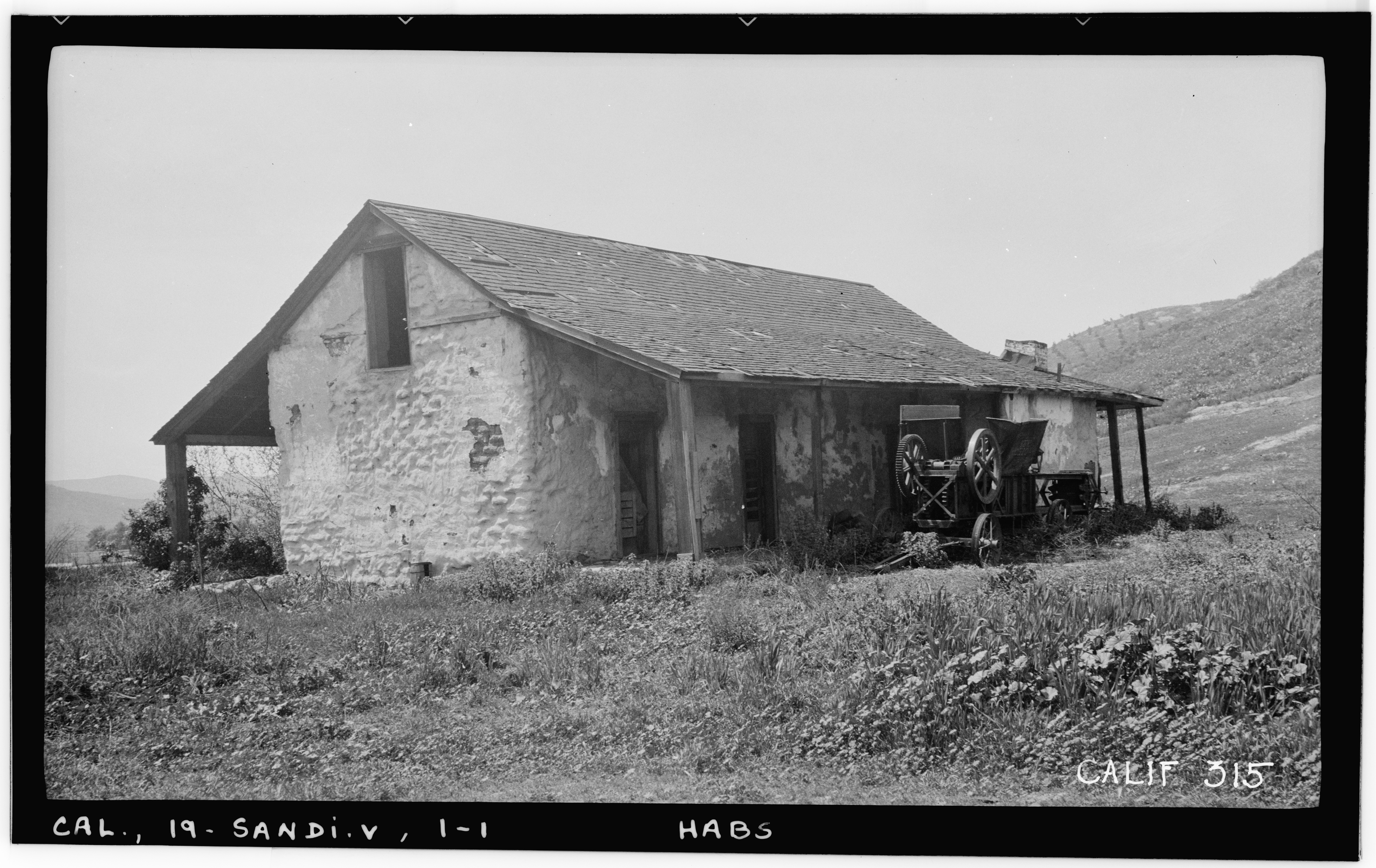
La Casa de Carrión, November 1934

In the mid-1880s, entrepreneur Isaac W. Lord purchased a tract of Jose Palomares' land and convinced the Santa Fe Railroad company to run its line across towards Los Angeles. Lord had the land surveyed for building lots and in 1887 had a large land sale, naming the new town 'Lordsburg' after himself. He also had a large Lordsburg Hotel constructed, but the land boom was over when it was completed. It sat empty for several years until sold to four members of the German Baptist Brethren Church, who persuaded others of that denomination that it would be an excellent site for a new institution of higher learning. Lordsburg College was founded in 1891.

In 1906 the town was incorporated as "Lordsburg." Residents grew field crops, and then began planting citrus trees, which flourished. Lordsburg became known as the "Heart of the Orange Empire." The city of La Verne flourished as a center of the citrus industry until after World War II, when the citrus industry slowly faded away. A surviving, and still producing, orange grove is on the grounds of La Verne Heritage Park.

== Geography ==
La Verne is a suburb 30 miles (48 km) east of Los Angeles, located in the Pomona Valley below the foothills of the San Gabriel Mountains part of the Angeles National Forest, a habitat known to support black bears. According to the United States Census Bureau, the city has a total area of 8.533 square miles (22.10 km^{2}), of which 8.422 square miles (21.81 km^{2}) is land and 0.11 square miles (0.28 km^{2}) is water. It is to the east of San Dimas and to the west of Claremont. The city of Pomona lies to the south. California State Route 210 bisects La Verne in an east–west direction, and Historic U.S. Route 66 also passes through the city.

=== Climate ===
According to the Köppen Climate Classification system, La Verne has a warm-summer Mediterranean climate, abbreviated "Csb" on climate maps.

== Demographics ==
Historical population
Census	Pop.	Note	%±
1910	954		—
1920	1,698		78.0%
1930	2,860		68.4%
1940	3,092		8.1%
1950	4,198		35.8%
1960	6,516		55.2%
1970	12,965		99.0%
1980	23,508		81.3%
1990	30,897		31.4%
2000	31,638		2.4%
2010	31,063		−1.8%
2020	31,334		0.9%
U.S. Decennial Census; 1860–1870 1880–1890; 1900 1910 1920; 1930 1940 1950; 1960 1970 1980; 1990 2000 2010; 2020

La Verne first appeared as a city in the 1910 U.S. census as part of the now defunct San Jose Township (pop 7,696 in 1900). It became part of the larger East San Gabriel Valley Division in the 1960 U.S. census and since 2000, as the East San Gabriel Valley Census County Division (CCD).

=== Racial and ethnic composition ===
La Verne city, California – Racial and ethnic composition Note: the US Census treats Hispanic/Latino as an ethnic category. This table excludes Latinos from the racial categories and assigns them to a separate category. Hispanics/Latinos may be of any race.
Race / Ethnicity (NH = Non-Hispanic)	Pop 1980	Pop 1990	Pop 2000	Pop 2010	Pop 2020	% 1980	% 1990	% 2000	% 2010	% 2020
White alone (NH)	18,340	22,038	20,129	17,197	14,373	78.02%	71.33%	63.62%	55.36%	45.87%
Black or African American alone (NH)	562	876	975	992	906	2.39%	2.84%	3.08%	3.19%	2.89%
Native American or Alaska Native alone (NH)	132	130	110	98	81	0.56%	0.42%	0.35%	0.32%	0.26%
Asian alone (NH)	758	2,129	2,244	2,310	3,379	3.22%	6.89%	7.09%	7.44%	10.78%
Native Hawaiian or Pacific Islander alone (NH)	758	2,129	41	54	47	3.22%	6.89%	0.13%	0.17%	0.15%
Other race alone (NH)	29	49	44	58	183	0.12%	0.16%	0.14%	0.19%	0.58%
Mixed race or Multiracial (NH)	x	x	780	719	1,180	x	x	2.47%	2.31%	3.77%
Hispanic or Latino (any race)	3,687	5,675	7,315	9,635	11,185	15.68%	18.37%	23.12%	31.02%	35.70%
Total	23,508	30,897	31,638	31,063	31,334	100.00%	100.00%	100.00%	100.00%	100.00%

=== 2020 census ===
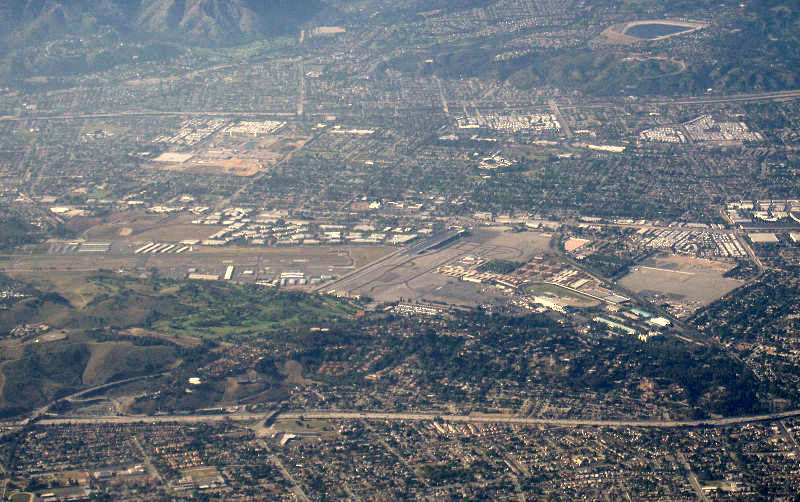
Aerial view of La Verne. Brackett Field is on the center left and Live Oak Reservoir is in the far right.

As of the 2020 census, La Verne had a population of 31,334. The population density was 3,720.5 inhabitants per square mile (1,436.5/km^{2}).

The age distribution was 19.2% under the age of 18, 8.0% aged 18 to 24, 21.8% aged 25 to 44, 27.5% aged 45 to 64, and 23.5% who were 65 years of age or older. The median age was 45.9 years. For every 100 females, there were 90.0 males, and for every 100 females age 18 and over there were 86.8 males age 18 and over.

The census reported that 99.4% of the population lived in households, 0.4% lived in non-institutionalized group quarters, and 0.2% were institutionalized. 100.0% of residents lived in urban areas, while 0.0% lived in rural areas.

There were 11,844 households in La Verne, of which 29.1% had children under the age of 18 living in them. Of all households, 53.5% were married-couple households, 4.2% were cohabiting couple households, 13.7% were households with a male householder and no spouse or partner present, and 28.7% were households with a female householder and no spouse or partner present. About 24.0% of all households were made up of individuals, and 14.7% had someone living alone who was 65 years of age or older. The average household size was 2.63. There were 8,439 families (71.3% of all households).

There were 12,218 housing units at an average density of 1,450.7 units per square mile (560.1 units/km^{2}), of which 11,844 (96.9%) were occupied. Of these, 71.1% were owner-occupied, and 28.9% were occupied by renters. The homeowner vacancy rate was 0.5%, and the rental vacancy rate was 4.7%.

=== 2023 ACS 5-year estimate ===
In 2023, the US Census Bureau estimated that the median household income was $104,565, and the per capita income was $50,951. About 6.3% of families and 8.2% of the population were below the poverty line.

=== 2010 census ===
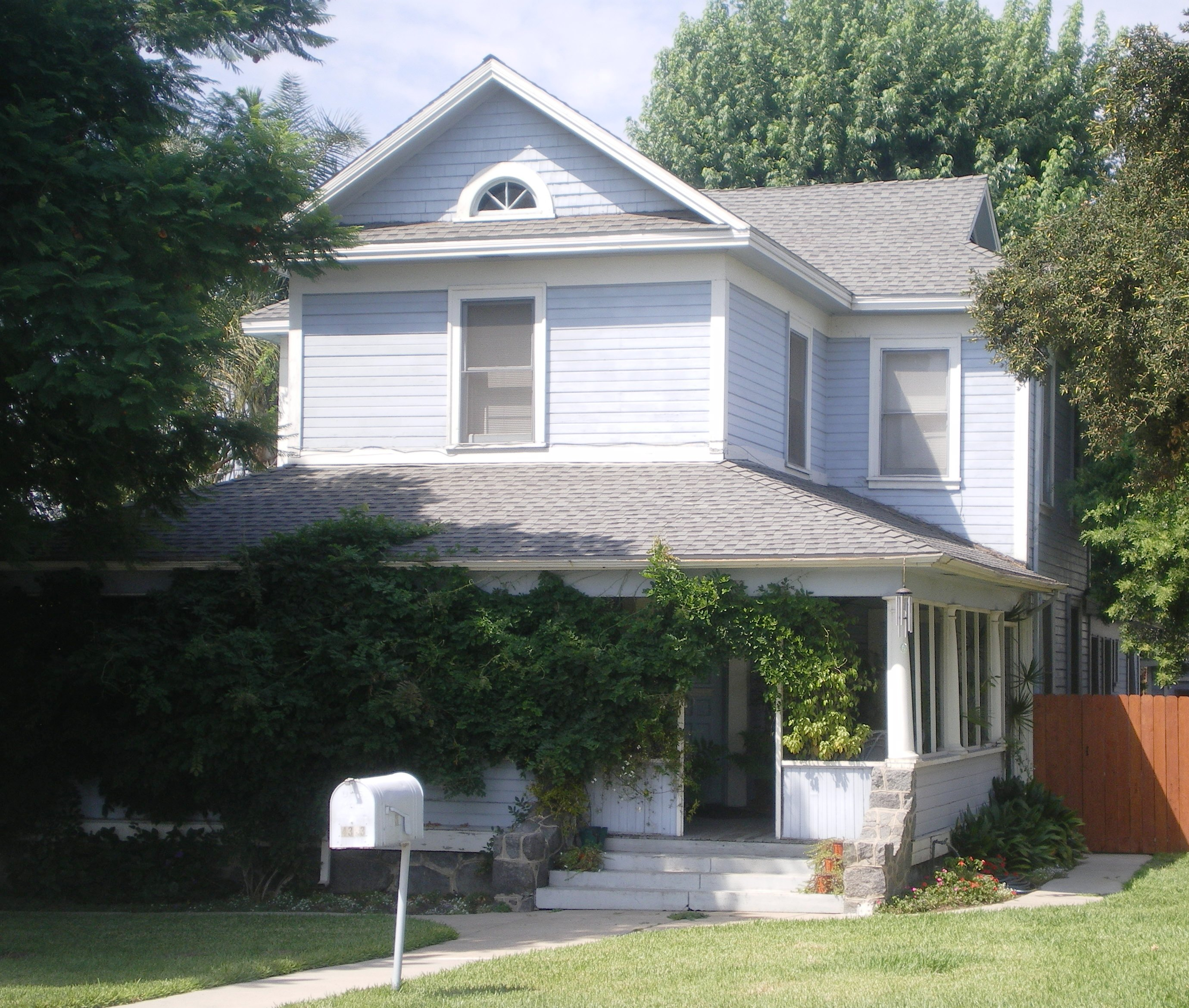
The Charles E. Straight House is listed on the National Register of Historic Places

At the 2010 census La Verne had a population of 31,063. The population density was 3,628.0 inhabitants per square mile (1,400.8/km^{2}). The racial makeup of La Verne was 23,057 (74.2%) White (55.4% Non-Hispanic White), 1,065 (3.4%) African American, 265 (0.9%) Native American, 2,381 (7.7%) Asian, 61 (0.2%) Pacific Islander, 2,822 (9.1%) from other races, and 1,412 (4.5%) from two or more races. Hispanic or Latino of any race were 9,635 persons (31.0%).

The census reported that 30,387 people (97.8% of the population) lived in households, 501 (1.6%) lived in non-institutionalized group quarters, and 175 (0.6%) were institutionalized.

There were 11,261 households, 3,582 (31.8%) had children under the age of 18 living in them, 6,286 (55.8%) were married couples living together, 1,438 (12.8%) had a female householder with no husband present, 489 (4.3%) had a male householder with no wife present. There were 420 (3.7%) unmarried couples living together, and 74 (0.7%) homosexual partners living together. 2,517 households (22.4%) had one person and 1,429 (12.7%) had someone who was 65 or older living alone. The average household size was 2.70. There were 8,213 families (72.9% of households); the average family size was 3.16.

The age distribution was 6,605 people (21.3%) under the age of 18, 3,106 people (10.0%) aged 18 to 24, 6,678 people (21.5%) aged 25 to 44, 9,417 people (30.3%) aged 45 to 64, and 5,257 people (16.9%) who were 65 or older. The median age was 42.9 years. For every 100 females, there were 89.9 males. For every 100 females age 18 and over, there were 87.2 males.

There were 11,686 housing units at an average density of 1,364.9 per square mile, of the occupied units 8,388 (74.5%) were owner-occupied and 2,873 (25.5%) were rented. The homeowner vacancy rate was 1.7%; the rental vacancy rate was 5.4%. 22,995 people (74.0% of the population) lived in owner-occupied housing units and 7,392 people (23.8%) lived in rental housing units.

During 2009–2013, La Verne had a median household income of $77,040, with 7.9% of the population living below the federal poverty line.

=== 2000 census ===
Mapping L.A. reported that in 2000, Mexican (17.7%) and German (12.2%) were the most common ancestries. Mexico (22.3%) and the Philippines (11.8%) were the most common foreign places of birth.

== Government ==
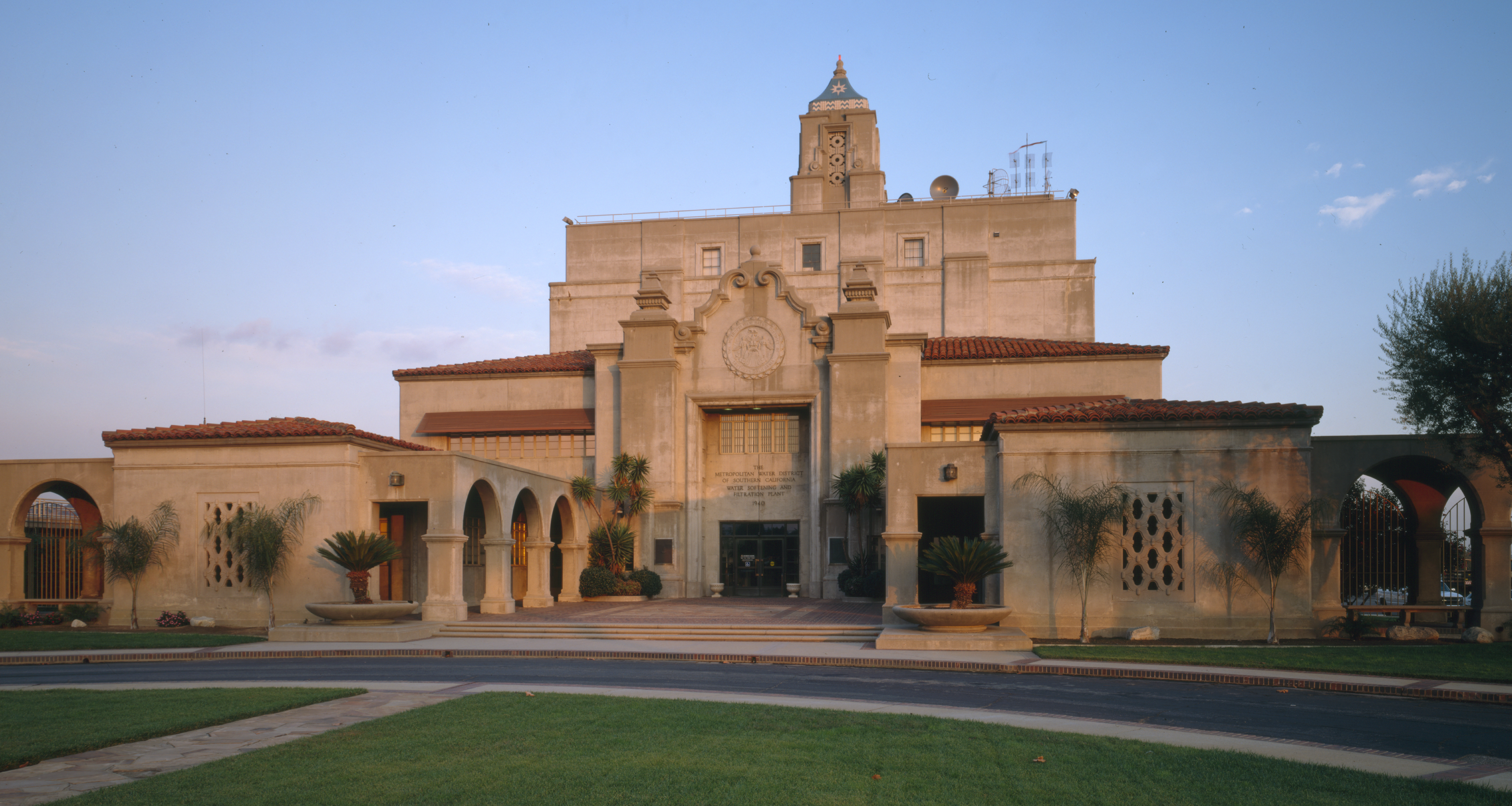
The historic Spanish Colonial Revival style Weymouth Treatment Plant, constructed 1938–1940.

La Verne is located in the 5th district of Los Angeles County, and is represented by supervisor Kathryn Barger.

In the state legislature, La Verne is in the 22nd Senate District, represented by Democrat Susan Rubio. and in the 41st Assembly district, represented by Democrat John Harabedian.

In the United States House of Representatives, La Verne is in the 31st District represented by Democrat Gil Cisneros

In the United States Senate, California is represented by Alex Padilla (D) and Adam B. Schiff (D).

The Los Angeles County Department of Health Services operates the Pomona Health Centre in Pomona, serving La Verne.

=== Public safety ===
The La Verne Police Department provides law enforcement services for the city of La Verne.

In 2018, the La Verne Police Department appointed its first woman captain, Colleen Flores.

Samuel Gonzalez is the current chief of police.

The La Verne Fire Department provides fire protection and emergency medical services for the city of La Verne.

== Education ==
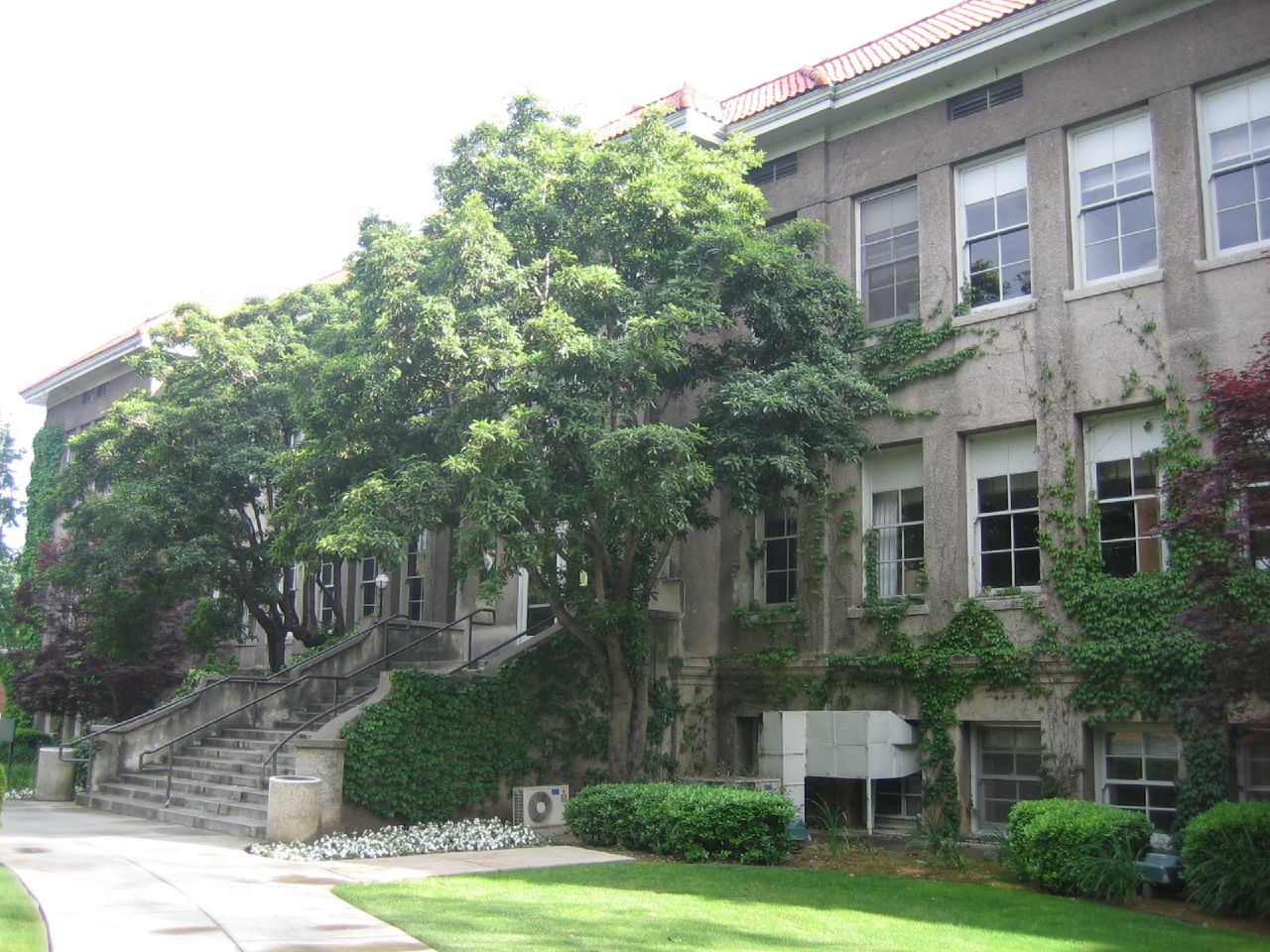
The University of La Verne.

The University of La Verne is located on 3rd Street in La Verne.

The Bonita Unified School District serves the city. Bonita High School is located on D Street.

Lutheran High School was located on Fruit Street and closed in 2024. Damien High School is a Catholic boys' school located at the intersection of Damien and Bonita Avenues. Calvary Baptist Schools is located at the intersection of Damien Avenue and Forestdale Street.

== Transportation ==
Regional train service is provided by Metrolink at the Pomona–North station, while local bus service is provided to the Pomona–Downtown station by Foothill Transit. A shuttle operates to Cal Poly Pomona. The Los Angeles Metro Rail A Line has been extended east from its current terminus in Azusa to Pomona. Light rail service at La Verne/Fairplex station, located between the University of La Verne and the Pomona Fairplex, commenced on September 19, 2025.

== In popular culture ==
In the 1967 film The Graduate, the finale wedding scene was shot in La Verne (not Santa Barbara as presented in the movie) at the United Methodist Church of La Verne.

The wedding scene in Wayne's World 2 was also filmed at the United Methodist Church of La Verne.

In 1998, actor Christian Slater was sentenced to 90 days in the La Verne jail for domestic assault

== Notable people ==
- Ewell Blackwell - Major League Baseball pitcher, Bonita High School alumnus
- Noah Clarke - professional hockey player
- Glenn Davis - American football player, Heisman Trophy winner, Bonita High School alumnus, class of 1943
- Jason David Frank - MMA fighter, Bonita High School alumnus
- Jeffrey Garcia - comedian, voice actor, radio DJ, had a house in La Verne
- Erin Gruwell - author of The Freedom Writers Diary, Bonita High School alumnus
- Sugar Shane Mosley - professional boxer, lives in La Verne
- Paula Jean Myers-Pope - diver, four-time Olympic medalist
- Ryan Stonehouse - American football player
- Roger Cumberland - Presbyterian missionary martyr in Kurdistan (1894-1938), the first American to ever set up home among the Iraqi Kurds
