= Calvary Baptist School =

Calvary Baptist School can refer to:

- Calvary Baptist School (Pennsylvania)
- Calvary Baptist School (Wisconsin)
- Calvary Baptist Schools in La Verne, California
