= Pomona Valley =

Valley in Los Angeles and San Bernardino counties in California

Coordinates: 34.076°N 117.657°W

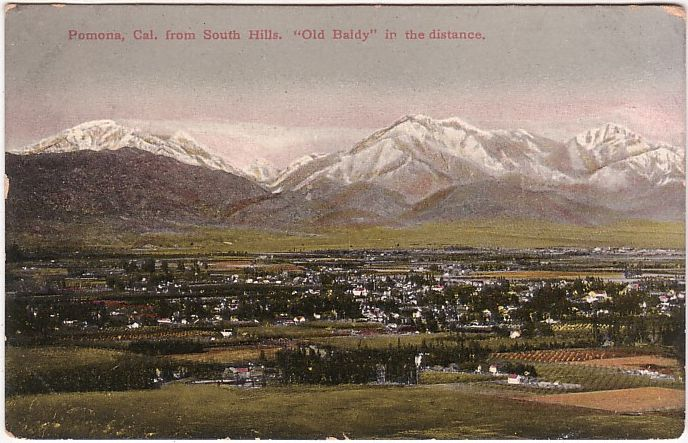
1910 postcard image of Pomona, California with Mount San Antonio (Mt. Baldy) in distance.

The Pomona Valley is located in the Greater Los Angeles Area between the San Gabriel Valley and San Bernardino Valley in Southern California. The valley is approximately 30 miles (48 km) east of downtown Los Angeles.

== History ==
The earliest inhabitants of Pomona Valley were the Gabrielino (Tongva) and Serrano Indigenous tribes.

== Geography ==
The alluvial valley is formed by the Santa Ana River and its tributaries. The Pomona Valley is separated from San Gabriel Valley to the west by the northeastern end of the San Jose Hills, running approximately along State Route 57. The eastern boundaries are the Jurupa Hills and the Cajon Pass, (the eastern end of the San Gabriel Mountains) running near Interstate 15, which separates the Pomona Valley from the San Bernardino Valley. The northern boundary is the San Gabriel Mountains. The Chino Hills are the southern boundary that separates the Pomona Valley from northern Orange County. Historic U.S. Route 66 runs east-west across the north side of Pomona Valley. San Antonio Creek runs right through the center of the valley dividing the valley into west and east, and also acts as a section of the border between Los Angeles County and San Bernardino County. It originates from the San Gabriel Mountains watershed around Mount San Antonio (known locally as Mt. Baldy) and joins the Santa Ana River south of Chino. The Pomona Valley ranges from the city of San Dimas from the far west to Rancho Cucamonga to the far east portion of the valley.

=== Climate ===
The Pomona Valley experiences a Mediterranean Climate. In contrast to much of the Greater Los Angeles Area, The Pomona Valley can get much hotter summers with high temperatures ranging from the triple digits. Due to its elevation ranging from 800 to 2200 feet, winters in the Pomona Valley can also get cold. Trace amounts of snowfall can occur anywhere above 1500 feet. On the valley floor, average rainfall amounts range anywhere from 12 to 16 inches. Foothill communities can get anywhere from 14 to 18 inches of rain a year. In the fall (fire season), Santa Ana Winds can occur giving strong offshore winds from the Cajon Pass.

Climate data for Pomona Fairplex, California
Month	Jan	Feb	Mar	Apr	May	Jun	Jul	Aug	Sep	Oct	Nov	Dec	Year
Record high °F (°C)	91 (33)	94 (34)	100 (38)	104 (40)	106 (41)	117 (47)	113 (45)	110 (43)	113 (45)	107 (42)	97 (36)	93 (34)	117 (47)
Mean daily maximum °F (°C)	65.5 (18.6)	67.6 (19.8)	70.1 (21.2)	74.2 (23.4)	77.8 (25.4)	84.1 (28.9)	91.0 (32.8)	91.1 (32.8)	88.4 (31.3)	80.6 (27.0)	73.2 (22.9)	66.4 (19.1)	77.5 (25.3)
Daily mean °F (°C)	51.8 (11.0)	54.0 (12.2)	56.2 (13.4)	59.9 (15.5)	63.9 (17.7)	68.8 (20.4)	74.4 (23.6)	74.6 (23.7)	71.9 (22.2)	65.2 (18.4)	57.9 (14.4)	52.4 (11.3)	62.6 (17.0)
Mean daily minimum °F (°C)	38.1 (3.4)	40.3 (4.6)	42.3 (5.7)	45.6 (7.6)	50.0 (10.0)	53.4 (11.9)	57.7 (14.3)	58.1 (14.5)	55.3 (12.9)	49.8 (9.9)	42.6 (5.9)	38.4 (3.6)	47.6 (8.7)
Record low °F (°C)	21 (−6)	22 (−6)	26 (−3)	29 (−2)	31 (−1)	38 (3)	41 (5)	42 (6)	38 (3)	29 (−2)	24 (−4)	22 (−6)	21 (−6)
Average precipitation inches (mm)	3.56 (90)	3.49 (89)	2.82 (72)	1.22 (31)	0.35 (8.9)	0.10 (2.5)	0.01 (0.25)	0.07 (1.8)	0.26 (6.6)	0.78 (20)	1.56 (40)	2.77 (70)	16.99 (432.05)
Source: Western Regional Climate Center

== Demographics ==
The residents of the Pomona Valley are predominantly Latino and white. In contrast to the San Gabriel Valley, the population of Asian Americans is much smaller. Northern areas of the valley that contain the cities of San Dimas, Claremont, La Verne and Upland have large Caucasian populations. Central portions of the valley that contain the cities of Pomona, Montclair, Chino, and Ontario have large Hispanic populations. Southern portions of the Pomona Valley such as Chino Hills, and Ontario Ranch contain rather large Asian populations. Rancho Cucamonga, a city in the north west of the valley is very diverse, with large groups of Hispanics, whites, Asians, and Black people.

== Points of interest ==
- American Museum of Ceramic Art, Pomona
- Fairplex, annual Los Angeles County Fair - Pomona
- California State Polytechnic University, Pomona - Pomona
- University of La Verne - La Verne
- Montclair Plaza - Montclair
- Pomona Valley Air Fair - Upland
- Pomona Valley Art Association - Gallery SOHO (located in the Pomona Arts Colony, Pomona)
- The Shoppes at Chino Hills - Chino Hills
- Raging Waters, water park - San Dimas
- Rancho Santa Ana Botanic Garden - Claremont
- Claremont Village - Claremont
- Claremont Colleges - Claremont
- Mt. San Antonio College - Walnut
- Ygnacio Palomares Adobe, List of Registered Historic Places in Los Angeles County, California - Pomona
- La Casa Primera de Rancho San Jose, List of Registered Historic Places in Los Angeles County, California - Pomona
- Victoria Gardens - Rancho Cucamonga
- Ontario Mills - Ontario
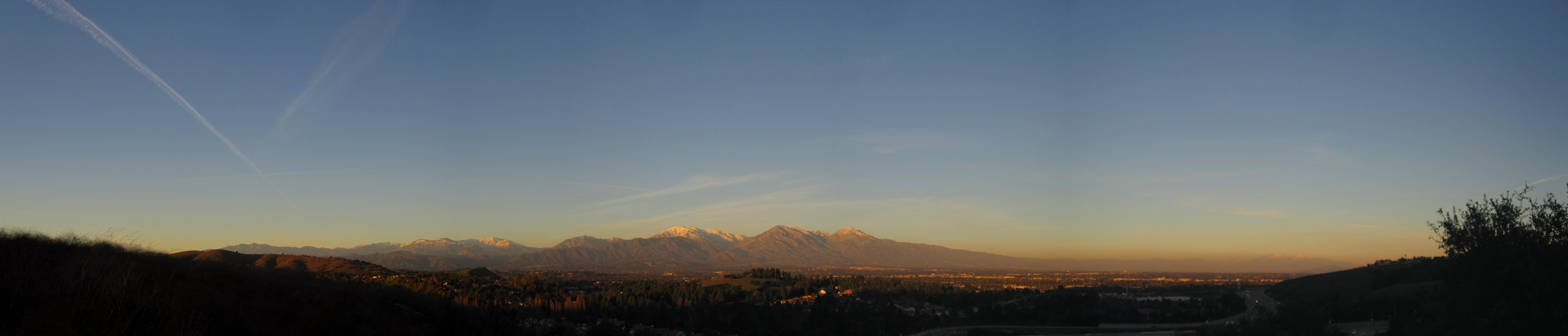
Pomona Valley from Diamond Ranch High School

== Communities ==
- Los Angeles County
  - Claremont
  - La Verne
  - Pomona
- San Bernardino County
  - Chino
  - Chino Hills
  - Montclair
  - Ontario
  - Rancho Cucamonga
  - San Antonio Heights
  - Upland

== Institutions of higher learning ==
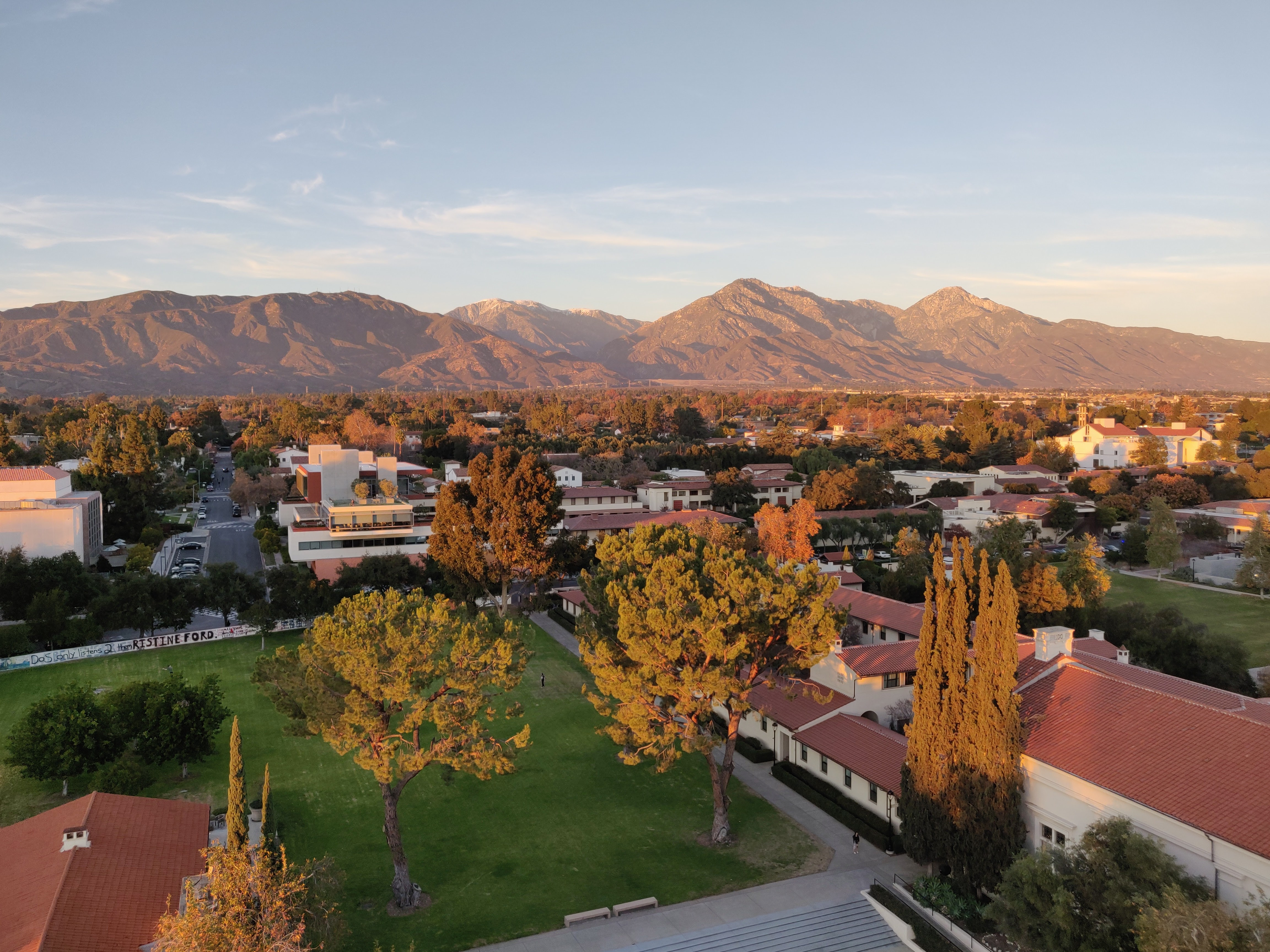
The Claremont Colleges

- California State Polytechnic University, Pomona (Cal Poly Pomona), public - Pomona
- Chaffey College, community college - Rancho Cucamonga
- Citrus College, community college - Glendora
- Claremont Colleges, liberal arts and engineering - Claremont
  - Pomona College
  - Claremont Graduate University
  - Scripps College
  - Claremont McKenna College
  - Harvey Mudd College
  - Pitzer College
  - Keck Graduate Institute
- Claremont School of Theology
- DeVry University, technical institute - Pomona
- Mt. San Antonio College, community college - Walnut
- University of La Verne, private - La Verne
- Western University of Health Sciences, private - Pomona

== Transportation ==
=== International Airports ===
- Ontario International Airport
- Los Angeles International Airport

=== Public transit ===
- Foothill Transit
- Omnitrans
- Amtrak (Sunset Limited, Texas Eagle)
- Metrolink (San Bernardino Line, Riverside Line)
- Los Angeles Metro Rail (A Line)

=== Highways ===
The Pomona Valley is served by several freeways:

- Interstate 10 (San Bernardino Freeway) - connects to San Bernardino and Los Angeles
- State Route 210 (Foothill Freeway) - connects to Pasadena and San Bernardino
- Interstate 15 (Ontario Freeway) - connects to Las Vegas, Nevada and San Diego
- State Route 60 (Pomona Freeway) - connects to Riverside and Los Angeles
- State Route 71 (Chino Valley Freeway)- connects to Corona
- State Route 57 (Orange Freeway) - connects to Anaheim

=== Major surface thoroughfares ===
- Central Ave. (Chino, Montclair, Upland)
- Mountain Ave. (Upland, Ontario, Chino)
- Euclid Ave. (Ontario, Upland, Chino)
- Archibald Ave. (Rancho Cucamonga, Ontario)
- Chino Hills Pkwy. (Diamond Bar, Chino Hills, Chino)
- Haven Ave. (Rancho Cucamonga, Ontario)
- Milliken Ave. (Rancho Cucamonga, Ontario)
- Monte Vista Ave. (Claremont, Upland, Montclair, Chino)
- Foothill Blvd. (San Dimas, La Verne, Claremont, Upland, Rancho Cucamonga, Pomona)
- Bonita Ave. (San Dimas, La Verne, Pomona, Claremont)
- Base Line Rd. (San Dimas, La Verne, Claremont, Rancho Cucamonga; becomes 16th St. through Upland)
- Indian Hill Blvd. (Claremont, Pomona)
- Grand Ave. (Chino Hills, Diamond Bar, Walnut)
- Towne Ave. (Claremont, Pomona)
- Garey Ave. (Chino Hills, Pomona, Claremont)
- Arrow Hwy. (San Dimas, La Verne, Pomona, Claremont, Montclair)
- Arrow Rte. (Upland, Rancho Cucamonga)
- Holt Ave. (Pomona, Montclair, Ontario; becomes Valley Blvd from Pomona to Los Angeles; Eastern end merges with the 10 Fwy)
- Valley Blvd. (Walnut, Pomona)
- Holt Blvd. (Pomona, Montclair, Ontario)
- Mission Blvd. (Pomona, Montclair, Ontario)
- Mount Baldy Road (Claremont, San Antonio Heights, Mount Baldy, and Mt. San Antonio)

In Claremont, Mt. Baldy Road leads into the Mt. Baldy Ski Lifts of Mount San Antonio in the San Gabriel Mountains.

== Media ==
- Claremont Courier a community newspaper for Claremont
- Inland Valley Daily Bulletin, with its offices located in Ontario, serving the Pomona/Ontario area

== See also ==
- Inland Empire
- San Gabriel Valley
