= Roger Cumberland =

Pioneering Protestant missionary among the Kurds, killed in Duhok in 1938

- Born: Roger Craig Cumberland; November 16, 1894; La Verne, California, U.S.
- Died: June 12, 1938 (aged 43); Mosul, Iraq
- Education: Occidental College (BA), McCormick Theological Seminary (BDiv)
- Occupation: Presbyterian missionary
- Years active: 1923–1938
- Known for: Pioneering philanthropy in Iraqi Kurdistan; correspondence and writings on interwar Kurdistan; martyrdom in Dohuk
- Notable work: Letters and articles on Kurdish culture and interwar Iraq
- Spouse: Harriet Gilbert Gunn
- Children: 2 daughters

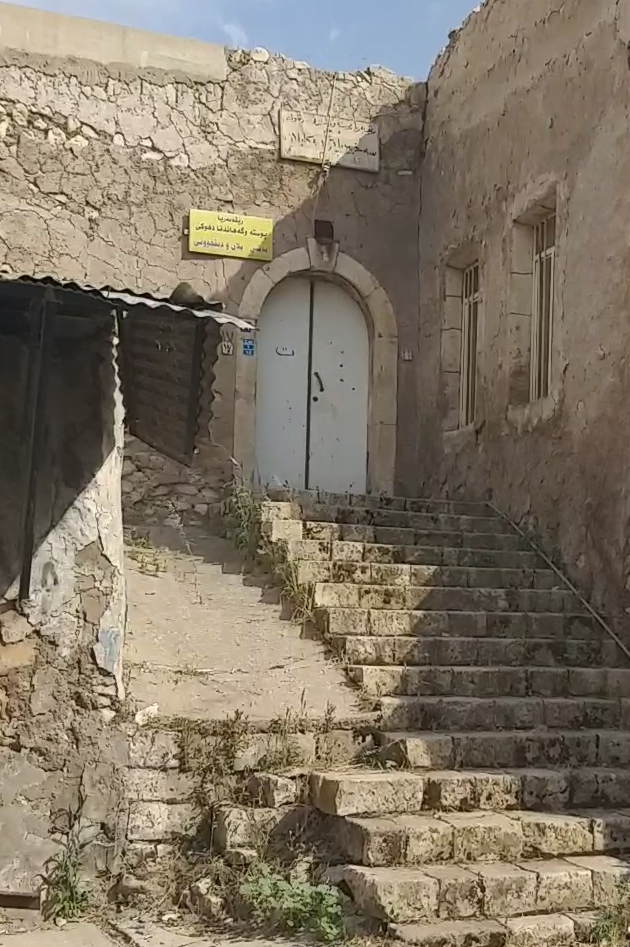
Cumberland's home where he was mortally shot on June 12, 1938

Roger C. Cumberland (November 16, 1894 – June 12, 1938) was an American Presbyterian missionary who was killed while living in Duhok in the Kurdistan region of Iraq.

Cumberland was born on November 16, 1894, in La Verne, California. He served as a field artillery officer for a year between his junior and senior year of college, and enlisted to serve in the First World War in 1917, but the war ended before he was deployed. He graduated in 1919 from Occidental College in Los Angeles and then 1922 from McCormick Theological Seminary. He arrived in Iraq in April 1923 to work as a missionary. His work began with the East Persia Mission, from where he went to Mosul, and afterwards to Dohuk. His New York Times obituary noted that he "made long trips to the villages of tribesmen, lived with the people and established Christian centers among them."

The United Mission in Mesopotamia was founded in 1924 by the Presbyterian Church in the U.S.A., the Reformed Church in America, and the Reformed Church in the United States. The mission had two schools: Baghdad High School Mansour, a girls' school in West Baghdad; and the School of High Hope, a boys' school in Basra. In the 1960s, the United Mission established a relief fund in Cumberland's name.

His wife Harriet Gilbert Gunn, who he married in 1927, was the daughter of missionaries to the Philippines. They had two daughters. Cumberland considered himself a man of the American West. He is reported to have said, "The blood of the pioneer is in me. I love the frontier."

Cumberland left behind numerous letters describing his life in Iraq, which describe meetings with figures including "the Patriarch of the Nestorian Church, the American Consul Thomas Owens, and an official with the Anglo-Persian Oil Company". His early time in Iraq coincided with the Barzanji Revolt of 1922–24, whose upheavals he reported in his letters. His summary observations about the Kurds were published in a missionary journal in 1926.

By 1926, Cumberland had bought a thousand acres of land, including the Assyrian village of Babillu, ten miles east of Duhok. The village reportedly cost $500.

By 1936 a military coup had taken place and was followed with the overthrow of that military officer by Nuri al-Said in 1937. Religious liberties began to decline and Cumberland received threats. On June 12, 1938, Cumberland was visited by two men who he talked to for an hour. One was the son of the agha of the village of Besifki, an hour's drive away. When Cumberland turn to pick up some CHristian literature at their request, they shot and killed Cumberland, and later his servant Musa. According to Dunn, "The murder was attributed to religious fanaticism, but the specific motives of the killers were more ambiguous."

There is some controversy over the rightful ownership of lands which Cumberland gave to Assyrian Christians in the area.

It is possible to visit the house in Duhok where Cumberland lived.

== Writings ==
Among Cumberland's published writings are the following, though his as-yet unpublished letters have also been much commented on by historians who have consulted them:

- "The Kurds", The Moslem World (Apr 1926).
- "A Voice from Kurdistan", World Dominion (Apr 1927).
- "Assyrians in Iraq", World Dominion (Apr 1933).

== Bibliography ==
- Young, Herrick B. (1939). Roger Craig Cumberland (1894–1938). New York: Board of Foreign Missions of the Presbyterian Church in the United States of America.
- Crescent Library's 7-page summary of his life, drawing on his unpublished letters (anon & undated, but c.2023)
- Robert Blincoe, Ethnic Realities and the Church: Lessons from Kurdistan. a History of Mission Work, 1668-1990 (Second Edition), Pasadena, CA: William Carey Publishing, 2019.
- Charles A. Dana and Joe P. Dunn, A Death in Dohuk: Roger C. Cumberland, Mission and Politics among the Kurds in Northern Iraq, 1923-1938 Journal of Third World Studies. 32 (1): 245–271.
- Tijmen C. Baarda (2023) Missionary involvement with the Simele massacre in 1933: the end of American sympathy for the Assyrians, British Journal of Middle Eastern Studies, DOI: 10.1080/13530194.2023.2233218
