= Rancho San José (Palomares) =

Land grant in California

Coordinates: 34.150°N 117.790°W

Rancho San Jose was a 15,000-acre (61 km^{2}) Mexican land grant in northeastern Los Angeles County given in 1837 by Governor Juan Bautista Alvarado to Ygnacio Palomares and Ricardo Véjar. Today, the communities of Pomona, LaVerne, San Dimas, Diamond Bar, Azusa, Covina, Walnut, Glendora, and Claremont are located in whole or part on land that was once part of the Rancho San Jose.

== History ==
Ygnacio Palomares and Ricardo Véjar, owned a considerable number of horses and cattle, which they kept at Rancho Rodeo de las Aguas owned by Maria Rita Valdez de Villa. The place was too crowded for the livestock of three families, so Palomares and Véjar sought their own land. In 1837, Mexican Governor Alvarado granted Rancho San Jose to Palomares and Véjar. The Rancho was created from land from the secularized Mission San Gabriel Arcángel. The boundaries were laid out by Palomares and Véjar on March 19, 1837, the feast day of Saint Joseph, thus leading the men to name the ranch after the saint. Father José Maria de Zalvidea accompanied the party from the San Gabriel Mission, performing the first Christian religious ceremony in the Pomona Valley when he performed a benediction for settlers of the rancho under an oak tree located at what is now 458 Kenoak Place in Pomona.

Luis Arenas, Ygnacio Palomares' brother-in-law, joined up with Palomares and Véjar, and they petitioned Governor Alvarado for additional grazing lands. They were granted the one square league addition (7500 acres), which became known as the Rancho San Jose Addition, in 1840. This increased the size of the Rancho San Jose to 22,000 acres. In 1846, Arenas sold his one third share of Rancho San Jose to Henry Dalton of Rancho Azusa de Dalton. This brought the Ranch back down to 15,000 acres in size.

With the cession of California to the United States following the Mexican–American War, the 1848 Treaty of Guadalupe Hidalgo provided that the land grants would be honored. As required by the Land Act of 1851, a claim for Rancho San Jose was filed with the Public Land Commission in 1852, and the grant was patented at 22,340 acres (90.4 km^{2}) to Dalton, Palomares and Véjar in 1875. A claim for the Rancho San Jose Addition was filed with the Land Commission in 1852, and the grant was patented at 4,431 acres (17.9 km^{2}) to Dalton, Palomares and Véjar in 1875.

Palomares and Véjar conducted sheep and cattle operations on Rancho San Jose, also growing crops for consumption by the residents of the rancho. In the early 1860s the west coast experienced an epic flood, followed by several years of severe drought which decimated the ranch's population of sheep and cattle. On top of which a smallpox epidemic claimed the lives of 3 of the Palomares' children. Ygancio Palomares died in 1864, and his widow began selling the ranch land in 1865, finally selling the Adobe in 1874 and moving in with her children. Véjar lost his share by foreclosure to two Los Angeles merchants, Isaac Schlesinger and Hyman Tischler, in 1864. The merchants took advantage of Véjar's inability to read English and his belief that what they told him the documents he was asked to sign actually meant. In 1866, Schlesinger and Tischler sold the ranch to Louis Phillips.

== Historic sites of the rancho ==
Due in part to the slower growth of eastern Los Angeles County, and the early activities of the Historical Society of Pomona Valley, many of the historic buildings of the Rancho San Jose remain in existence today, several of them operated by the Historical Society. Historic sites of Rancho San Jose include the following:

- La Casa Primera de Rancho San Jose – the original adobe home of Ygnacio Palomares built in 1837; now operated by the Historical Society of Pomona Valley
- La Casa Alvarado – an adobe home built in 1840 by Palomares' close friend, Yganacio Alvarado, near the Casa Primera
- Ygnacio Palomares Adobe – the second and larger adobe home built by Ygnacio Palomares between 1849 and 1854; now operated by the Historical Society of Pomona Valley
- Phillips Mansion – mansion built in 1875 by Louis Phillips, who bought 12,000 acres (49 km^{2}) consisting of the southern part of the Rancho in 1864; Phillips went on to become the richest man in Los Angeles County; the mansion is now operated by the Historic Society of Pomona Valley
- San Dimas Hotel – railroad hotel built by the San Jose Ranch Company in 1887 in anticipation of a land boom that went bust; the hotel never had a paying guest and became a private residence; now operated by the City of San Dimas

== Ygnacio Palomares ==
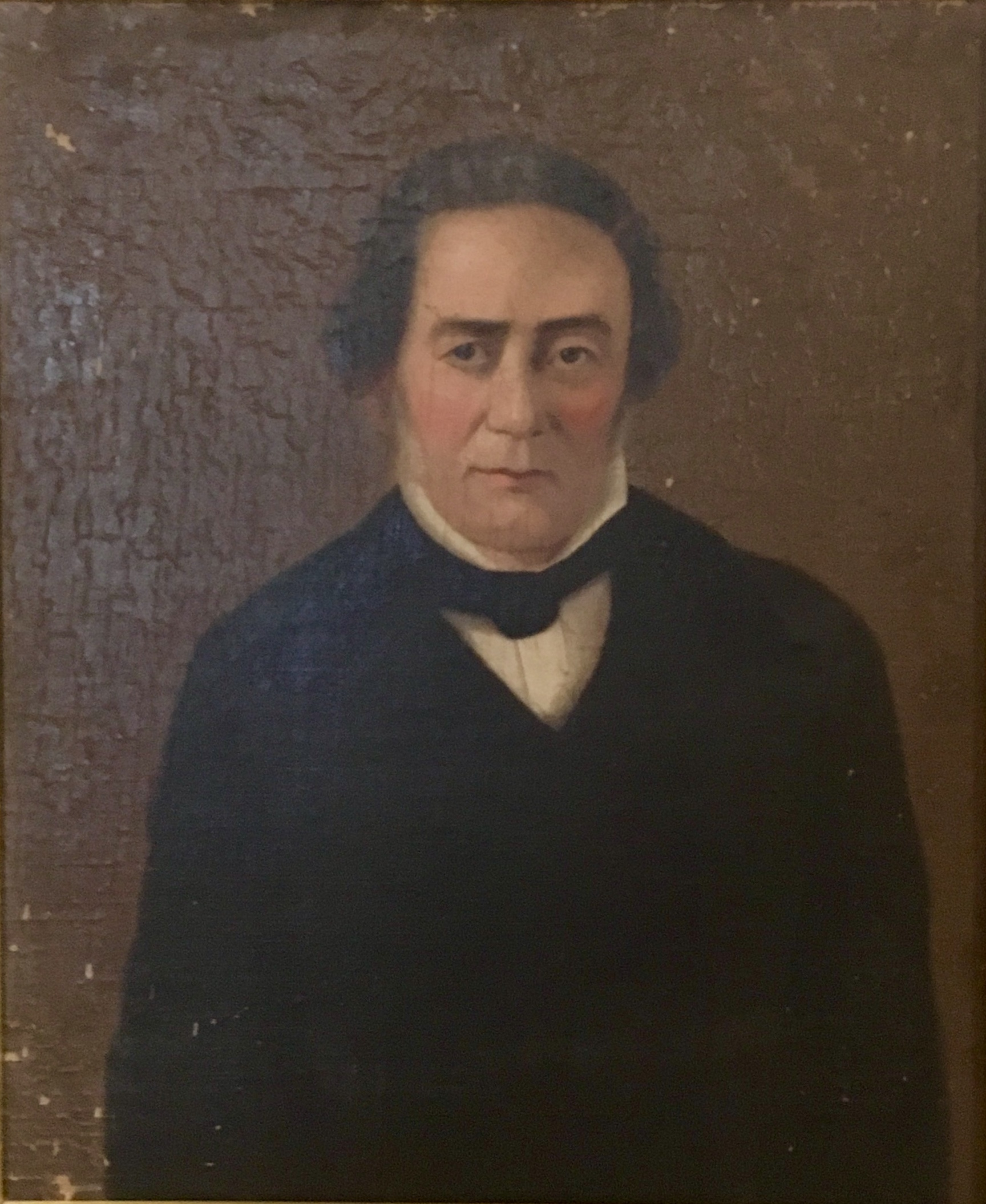
1850 portrait of Ygnacio Palomares

Ygnacio Palomares (February 2, 1811 – November 25, 1864) was a Californio, born near Mission San Fernando in Alta California, one of thirteen children. He was the son of José Cristobal Palomares and Maria Benedicta Saez, one of Los Angeles' most prominent families and considered Spanish aristocracy. Ygnacio Palomares married Maria Concepcion Lopez in 1832 and they had eight children: Luis José, José Tomas, Teresa, Francisco, Maria Josefa, Maria de Jesus, Manuel, and Carolina Concepcion. Ygnacio Palomares was active in Los Angeles politics in the 1830s and 1840s. He served as Juez de Campo (Country Judge) in 1834, and in 1840. He served as Juez de Paz (Justice of the Peace) in 1841 and during this time made some unpopular decisions, including a controversial verdict in the murder of Nicolas Fink. His investigation led to the arrest of a woman, who in turn provided three male accomplices that were found guilty. In the lead up to the trial, he issued a ban on public meetings, declared a nightly curfew and posted soldiers to guard the jail. He was a regidor (councilman) in 1835, and again in 1838. He was an elector in 1843, voting for Santa Ana for the President of Mexico. In 1844, he was Captain of the Defensores (militia) and the following year he served as an alternate in the assembly. He was elected the last Mexican California mayor of Los Angeles in 1848, but held the position briefly due to Colonel Jonathan Stevenson considering him intolerable and anti-American. After his tenure as mayor, he settled into his Rancho San José adobe. Among his contributions to the new American landscape was the capture of the Alvitre brothers, sought for the murder of American James Ellington.

== Ricardo Véjar ==
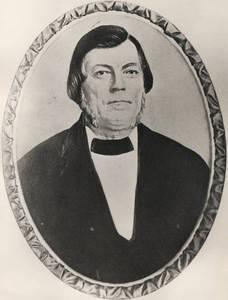
Ricardo Véjar.

Nepomuceno Ricardo Véjar (1805–1882) was born in San Diego, the son of Francisco Salvador Véjar, a soldier in San Diego. The family moved to Los Angeles (Rancho Rodeo de las Aguas) in 1810. Ricardo Véjar served as Juez de Campo (Country Judge) in Los Angeles in 1833. Véjar's sister, Magdalena Véjar, was married to Jorge Morrillo, grantee of Rancho Potrero de Felipe Lugo. Ricardo Véjar married Maria Bendita Soto. Véjar owned a one third share of Rancho San Jose and was also the owner of Rancho Los Nogales. Vejar was offered assistance to feed his cattle in the face of a long term drought. It is well documented that Véjar was grossly misinformed about the nature of a document he was asked to sign after being told it was only an agreement to pay for feed and supplies for his cattle with Interest. In fact the 2 New York "merchants" who offered him the feed gave him a Mortgage, written in English, and interest on the mortgage compounded monthly. He was unable to pay one of the installments and the merchants foreclosed. He lived the rest of his years in the Spadra area with his family. He died in poverty in 1882.

== Luis Arenas ==
Luis Arenas came to California, possibly in 1834, with a group of colonists. He was married to Josefa Palomares (1815–1901), the sister of Ygnacio Palomares. He was the alcalde of Los Angeles in 1838. On November 8, 1841, Luis Arenas received the Rancho El Susa land grant from Governor (pro-tem) Manuel Jimeno. In 1844 Henry Dalton purchased El Susa from Arenas, and also Arenas one third interest in Rancho San Jose. Arenas was a grantee of Rancho Pauba in 1844, and Rancho Los Huecos in 1846. His son, Cayetano Arenas, was secretary to Governor Pio Pico and was the grantee of Rancho San Mateo.

== See also ==
- Ranchos of California
- List of Ranchos of California
- Ranchos of Los Angeles County
