= Calvary Baptist Schools =

Private school in California, United States

Calvary Baptist Schools is a Pre-Kindergarten through grade 12 private Baptist school in La Verne, California, in the Los Angeles metropolitan area. It serves levels preschool through senior high school. It was established in 1953.
