= La Casa Primera de Rancho San José =

Historic house in California, United States

- Casa Primera de Rancho San Jose
- U.S. National Register of Historic Places
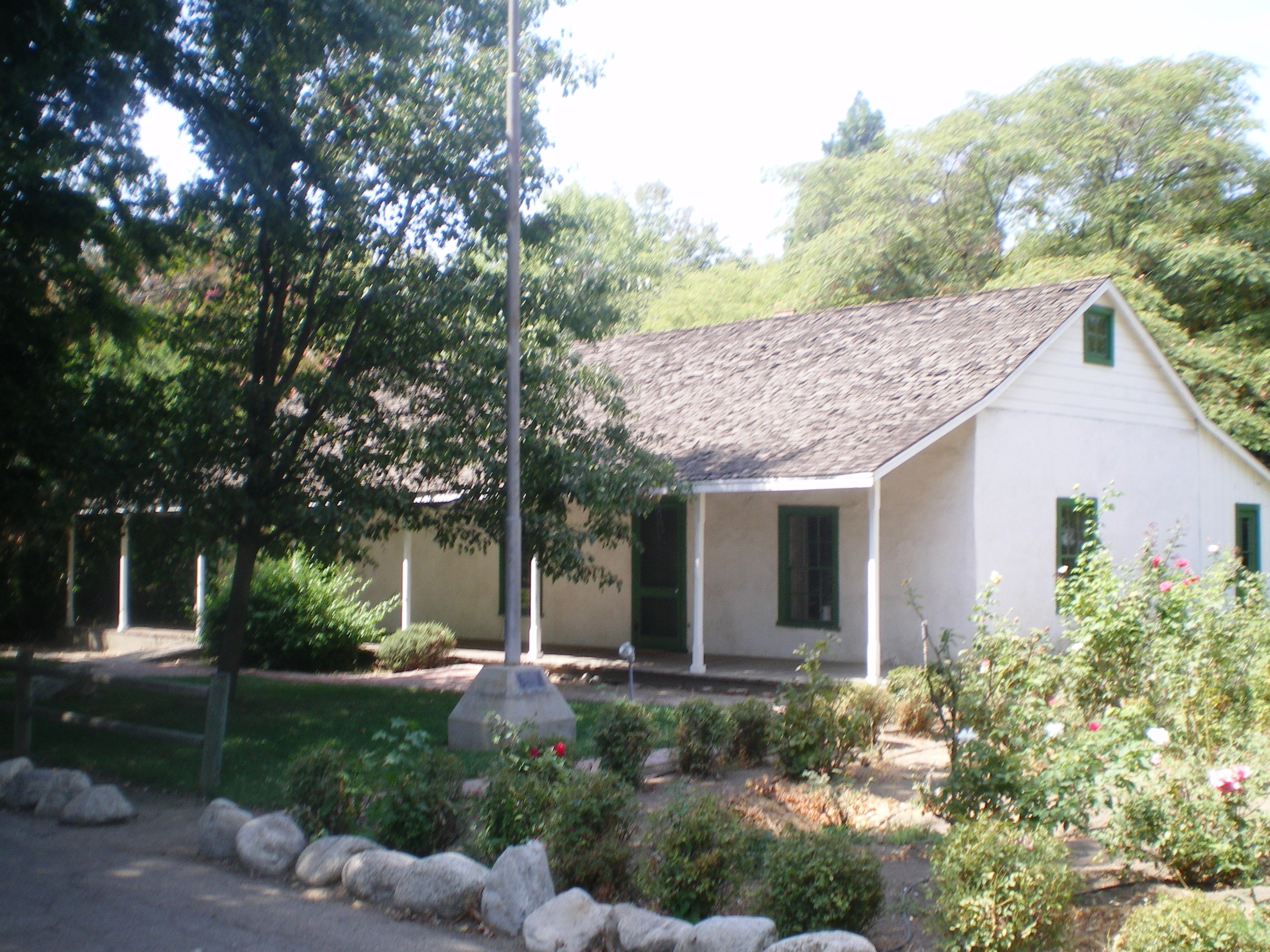
- Casa Primera de Rancho San Jose, August 2008

- Location within the Los Angeles metropolitan area Location within California Location within the United States
- Location: 1569 N. Park Ave., Pomona, California
- Coordinates: 34.075214°N 117.755078°W
- Area: 1.6 acres (0.65 ha)
- Built: 1837
- NRHP reference No.: 75000436
- Added to NRHP: April 3, 1975

La Casa Primera de Rancho San Jose is a historic adobe structure built in 1837 in Pomona, California. It is the oldest home located in the Pomona Valley and in the old Rancho San Jose land grant. It was declared a historic landmark in 1954 and added to the National Register of Historic Places in April 1975.

== History ==
The Rancho San Jose was created out of land seized from the Mission San Gabriel Arcángel in 1834 as part of the Mexican government's decree of secularization. In 1837, Mexican Governor Juan Bautista Alvarado granted the land to Ygnacio Palomares and Ricardo Vejar. The Rancho, covering 15,000 acres (61 km^{2}) to 22,000 acres (89 km^{2}) and much of eastern Los Angeles County, was operated by Palomares and Vejar as a sheep and cattle ranch.

After receiving the land grant, Palomares built his initial adobe homestead in 1837 on land that is now part of Pomona. The simple five-room adobe, which is known as the Casa Primera, was the first home in the Pomona Valley and was built in the Mexican adobe style with thick walls made of adobe brick. Palomares and his family lived at the Casa Primera for approximately seventeen years. Between 1850 and 1855, Palomares built a much larger adobe home for himself, known as the Ygnacio Palomares Adobe.

In 1867, Palomares' son, Francisco Palomares, moved into the Casa Primera with his wife, Lujardo Alvarado. Francisco discovered an artesian well on the grounds of the adobe, the first such well discovered in the Pomona Valley. The well provided an ample supply of water, allowing Francisco to plant the area with orange trees, some of which were still thriving in the 1970s. Taking advantage of the area's water resources, Francisco and his partners also formed the Old Settlement Water Company in 1874. Portions of an old stone-lined canal built by the water company can still be seen in the area. Francisco Palomares lived in the Casa Primera until he died in 1882.

After Francisco's death, the Casa Primera was purchased by Dr. Benjamin S. Nichols, who also acquired the nearby La Casa Alvarado. Nichols, who had moved to Pomona from New York, became the President of the Pomona Land and Water Company.

In 1947, Roscoe Hart purchased the property and remained the owner until 1972. In 1972, Hart sold the Casa Primera at a public auction. He told the Los Angeles Times that "the work of keeping it up became too much." At that time, the home consisted of four bedrooms, two baths, a dining room, three fireplaces and a pool on 1.7 acres (6,900 m^{2}). Hoping to preserve the Casa Primera, the Historical Society of Pomona Valley raised funds to purchase the property for a price up to $80,000. When the bidding went above $80,000, the auctioneer halted the bidding for two minutes to allow Historical Society representatives to confer. The Historical Society ultimately placed the winning bid, purchasing the home for $85,000. Another bidder said afterward she had been prepared to go to $100,000 but agreed not to raise the bid on learning she was bidding against the Historical Society.

After acquiring the Casa Primera, the Historical Society restored it with period furniture and opened it to the public as a historic museum. Since 1973, it has been a frequent location for traditional Mexican and Spanish folklorico celebrations, including Spanish shawl displays, music and dancing. In 1987, a celebration was held at the Casa Primera celebrating the 150th anniversary of the signing of the Rancho San Jose land grant. The celebration included Mexican dancers, strolling musicians, a parade of the descendants of early Mexican families, and a staged wedding ceremony with the principals and guests dressed in period costume.

== Historic designation ==
The site was added to the National Register of Historic Places in 1975. The building is operated as a museum by the Historical Society of Pomona Valley.

== See also ==
- List of Registered Historic Places in Los Angeles County, California
- Rancho San Jose
- Ygnacio Palomares Adobe
- La Casa Alvarado
