= Ygnacio Palomares Adobe =

Historic house in California, United States

- U.S. National Register of Historic Places
- California Historical Landmark
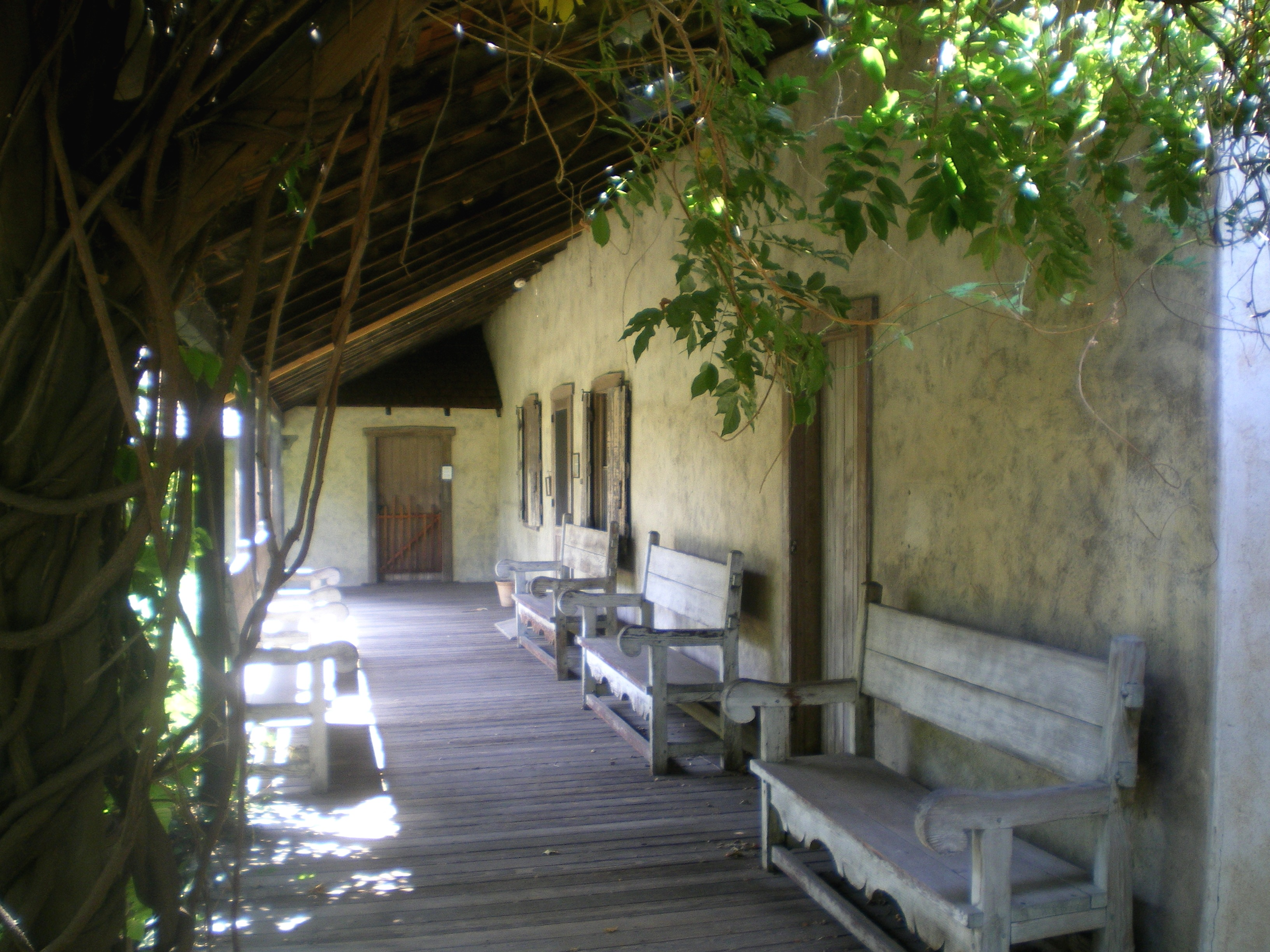
- Ygnacio Palomares Adobe, August 2008
- Location: 491 East Arrow Highway, Pomona, California
- Coordinates: 34.09046°N 117.74299°W
- Built: 1855
- Architectural style: adobe
- NRHP reference No.: 71000156
- CHISL No.: 372
- Added to NRHP: March 3, 1971

The Ygnacio Palomares Adobe, also known as Adobe de Palomares, is a one-story adobe brick structure in Pomona, California, built between 1850 and 1855 as a residence for Don Ygnacio Palomares. It was abandoned in the 1880s and was left to the elements until it was acquired by the City of Pomona in the 1930s. In 1939, the adobe was restored in a joint project of the City of Pomona, the Historical Society of Pomona Valley and the Works Project Administration. Since 1940, it has been open to the public as a museum on life in the Spanish and Mexican ranchos. It was listed on the National Register of Historic Places in 1971. Of the more than 400 sites in Los Angeles County that have been listed on the National Register, fewer than ten received the distinction prior to the Ygnacio Palomares Adobe.

== History and architecture ==
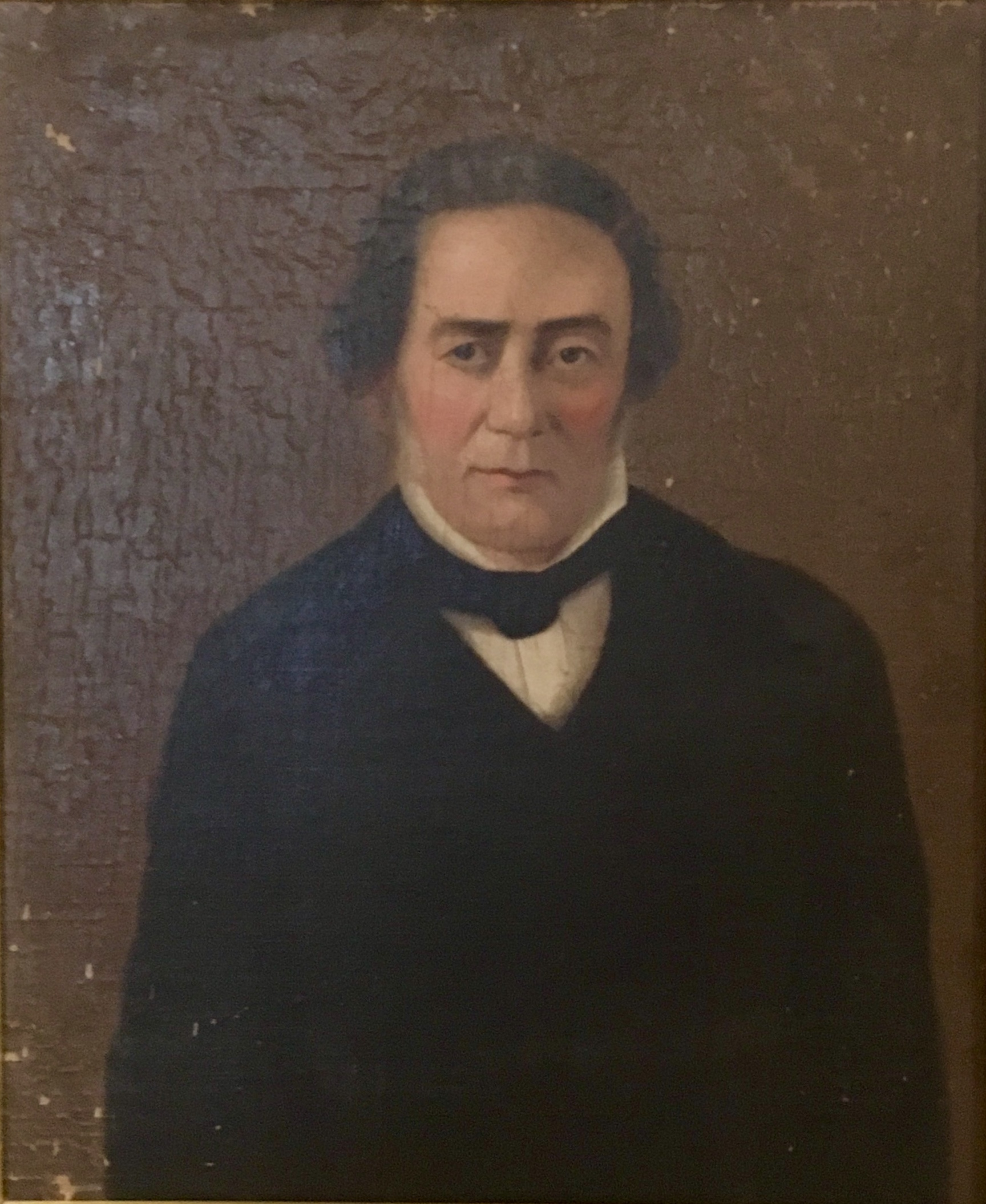
Don Ygnacio Palomares

=== Rancho San Jose ===
The Ygancio Palomares Adobe, built between 1850 and 1855, was once the center of the sprawling 22,000-acre (89 km^{2}) Rancho San Jose. The Rancho San Jose consisted of land taken from the Mission San Gabriel in 1834 as part of the Mexican government's secularization decree. In 1837, Mexican Governor Juan Bautista Alvarado granted the land to Ygnacio Palomares and Ricardo Vejar, both Californio sons of New Spain natives. The Rancho San Jose operated by Dons Palomares and Vejar covered land that now forms the communities of Pomona, La Verne, San Dimas, Diamond Bar, Azusa, Covina, Walnut, Glendora, and Claremont. Palomares initially lived in "La Casa Primera", an earlier adobe which is also operated by the Historical Society of Pomona Valley.

=== Construction and architecture ===
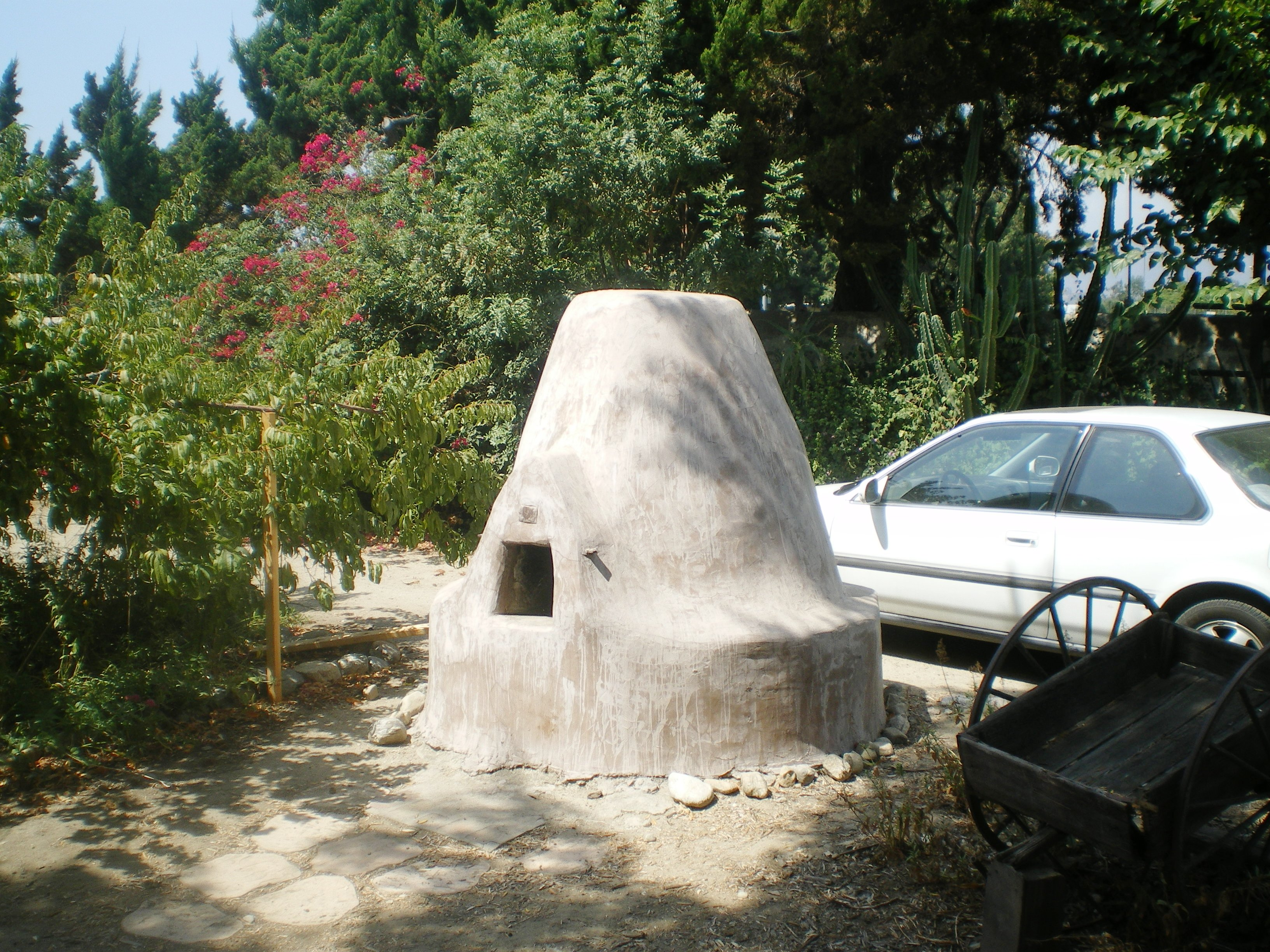
Horno at the Palomares Adobe

Between 1850 and 1855, Palomares built a new home, which is the present historic site. The 13-room adobe was built in a T-shape with a courtyard. The living room and master bedroom were located at the stem of the T, and the adobe also had four more bedrooms, a dining room, kitchen, storeroom, tienda (or store), and storage chambers. The kitchen was located at the north end of the T, close to the outdoor oven (or "horno"). The house has been said to represent the blending of Mexican adobe construction and American styles, with the use of wood-shake roofing and milled-wood flooring on the adobe structure.

=== Use by the Palomares family ===
The Palomares Adobe was used for a time as an overnight stagecoach stop at the midway point between Los Angeles and San Bernardino. The Palomares home was reportedly "the heart of the rancho," with its doors open to travelers and a store that provided goods to settlers. The large living room served for many years as a meeting place and a chapel where padres from the San Gabriel Mission would travel once a month to say mass. Ygnacio Palomares and his wife operated the land as a sheep and cattle ranch, grew their own crops, and raised five children at the adobe. The ranch prospered for many years, but a severe drought devastated the ranch in the early 1860s. Smallpox also claimed the lives of three of the Palomares' children, and Don Ygnacio died in 1864.

Don Ygnacio's widow, Dona Concepcion Lopez de Palomares (also known as "Dona China"), began selling off the ranch land in 1865. In 1874, another of the Palomares' children died, and Dona China sold the remaining 2,000 acres (8.1 km^{2}), including the adobe, at $8 an acre, to John R. Loop and Alvin R. Meserve. The new owners, the Meserve family, continued to maintain the adobe as a community gathering place after acquiring it in 1874. Prominent Los Angeles attorney Edwin A. Meserve, later recalled coming to the adobe as "a sickly youngster of 13" in 1877, regaining his health while living in the old adobe. However, by the mid-1880s, the old adobe had been deserted.

=== Deterioration ===
From the 1880s through the 1920s, the adobe was left to the elements and fell into severe disrepair, with whole wings of the house being washed away and the walls and roof crumbling. The dilapidated condition of the adobe is shown in 1938 photographs seen here and here.

== Restoration and museum ==
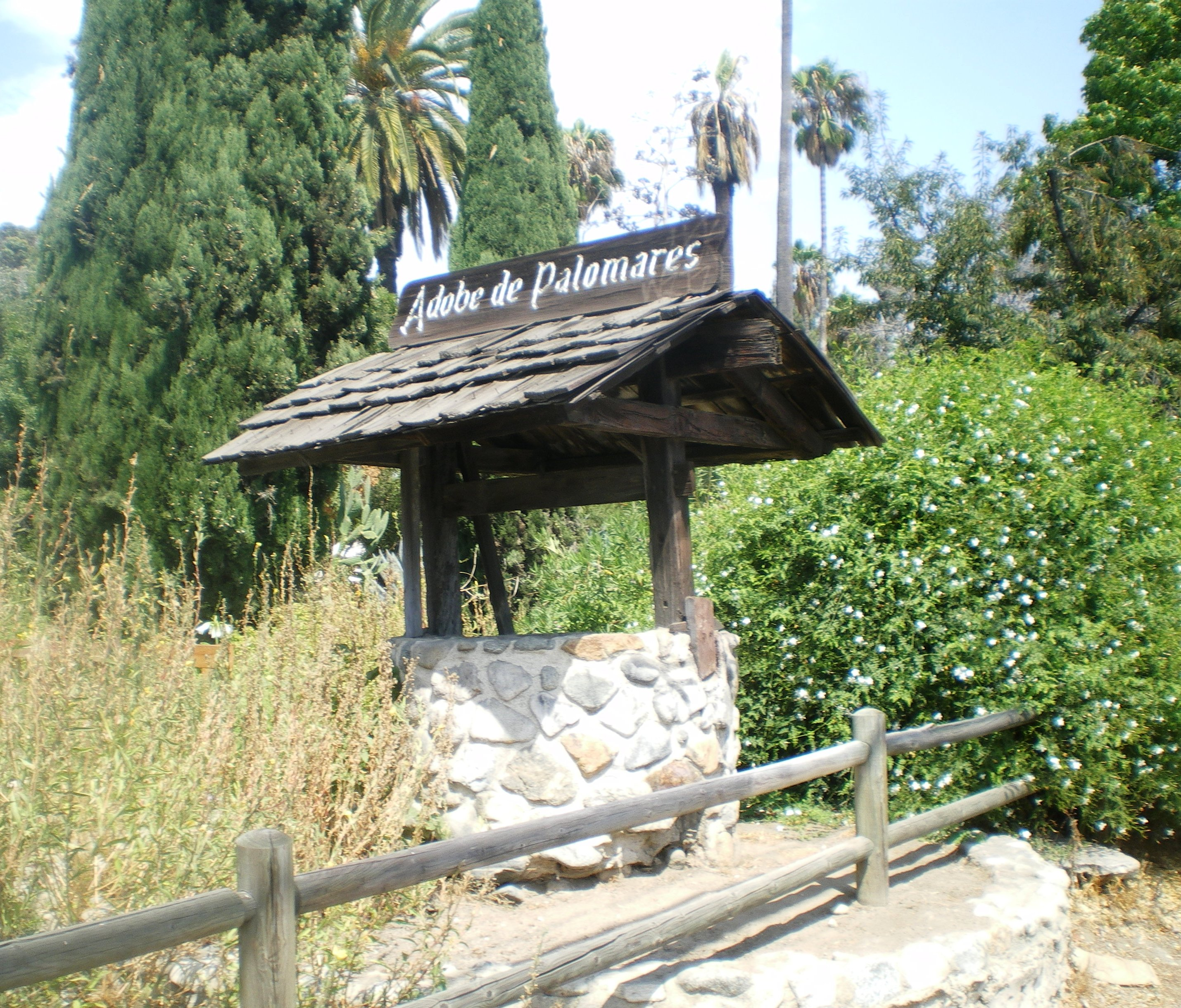
The adobe's well

In 1934, the City of Pomona purchased the land for a reservoir, and the Historical Society of Pomona Valley began plans for restoration of the adobe and surrounding site. In the spring and summer of 1939, seventy WPA workers began the process of restoring the adobe. Following the traditional method, the workers molded the adobe bricks by hand using dirt from the Ganesha Hills and straw as the only binder, and cured the bricks in the sun. Approximately 25,000 new adobe bricks were used in the restoration process. The cost of the restoration was placed at $54,000. Many of the bricks were also made from the broken original adobe bricks - the new bricks used shorter lengths of straw, while the old bricks showed the use of longer marsh grass.

The restoration was completed in December 1939, followed by its furnishing with period furniture typical of the California ranchos, This effort was led by the head of the Furnishing Committee, Mrs. Harry Walker of San Dimas. The original landscaping was also restored with wisteria vines and wild cherry, black walnut, pomegranate, and poplar trees. Charles Gibbs Adams oversaw the landscaping restoration, with tree plantings, shrubs and rosebushes located close to where they had been in the mid-19th century.

The adobe was dedicated and opened to the public in April 1940 as a museum focusing on life in the early California ranchos. At the dedication ceremony, the keys were presented by Pomona's mayor to the Historical Society of Pomona Valley, and Ygancio Palomares, grandson of Don Ygnacio, "danced the dances taught him by his grandmother, his granddaughter Hilda Ramirez, being his dancing partner." The restoration was well-received, with commendation from Ed Ainsworth of the Los Angeles Times writing: "The example of this restoration ought to inspire other communities and families to do the same. This adobe has now become an imperishable glorification of early California, and an irresistible lure for modern visitors." Two years later, the Los Angeles Times reported: "The structure has become famous throughout the nation as a permanent museum housing many relics and equipment of the early Spanish days in California." In 1968, it was called "one of the pleasantest and most complete of the rancho restorations."

Members of the Palomares family were invited to move into the restored adobe as caretakers. In December 1939, Porfiero R. Palomares (c. 1871–1942), who was born in the adobe and was the grandson of Don Ygnacio, moved into the restored structure as caretaker with his wife and daughter. Porfiero lived at the adobe until he died there in October 1942. Porfiero's widow, Hortensia Yorba Palomares, continued to live in the adobe until her death in July 1958.

=== Rebuilding of the Palomares Adobe mural (1941) ===
Artist and filmmaker Frank Stauffacher created a 16.5-foot long oil-on-fabric mural depicting construction on the Palomares Adobe, which is mounted on the west wall of the former Santa Fe Rail Station, now the Pomona Transit Center, Pomona. The mural's workers and spectators are depicted in 19th century attire, suggesting a nostalgic perspective.

== California Historical Landmark ==
The California Historical Landmark Marker NO. 372 at the site reads:

- NO. 372 ADOBE DE PALOMARES - Completed about 1854 and restored in 1939, this was the family home of Don Ygnacio Palomares. Governor Juan B. Alvarado granted Rancho San Jose to Don Ygnacio and Don Ricardo Vejar in 1837.

== See also ==
- List of Registered Historic Places in Los Angeles County, California
- La Casa de Carrión land gifted by Ygnacio Palomares to Saturnino Carrión a Historic Place.
