= North Hills League =

High-school athletic league in California

The North Hills League is a high school athletic league. It is part of the CIF Southern Section. Members are located in Orange County and are part of the Century Conference which is composed of team that were previously part of the Century League.

== Members ==
- Brea Olinda High School
- El Dorado High School
- El Modena High School
- Esperanza High School
- Foothill High School (Football, Track and Field, Wrestling and Boys Volleyball only)
- Villa Park High School
- Yorba Linda High School
