= Crestview League =

High school athletic league in Orange County, California

The Crestview League is a high school athletic league that is part of the CIF Southern Section. Members are located in Orange County and are part of the Century Conference which is composed of team that were previously part of the Century League.

== Members ==
- Canyon High School
- El Dorado High School (Baseball, LaCrosse, Soccer, Volleyball and Girls Tennis only)
- El Modena High School (Baseball, Football and LaCrosse only)
- Esperanza High School
- Foothill High School
- Yorba Linda High School
