= Symbol Six =

American band

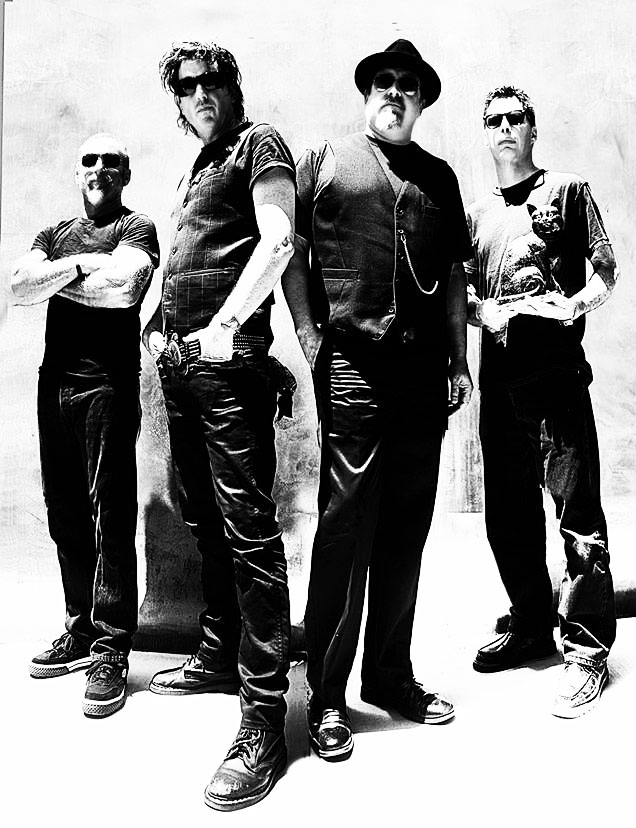
- Symbol Six in 2015

Background information
- Origin: Santa Monica, California, United States
- Genres: Punk rock, rock and roll
- Years active: 1980–1982, 2010–present
- Labels: Dr Strange Records, Posh Boy, Jailhouse Records, Symbol Six Music
- Members: Eric Leach; Phil George; Evan Shanks; Tony Fate
- Past members: Donny Brook; Mark Conway; Steve Cooper; Taz Rudd
- Website: www.symbolsix.com

Symbol Six is an American rock and roll band formed in Santa Monica, California, United States, in 1980 by Eric Leach, Phil George, Mark Conway, Donny Brook (original bass player for Necros), Taz Rudd, and Steve Cooper. Originating in Los Angeles and Orange County, when the band started the average age of the band members was 15 years old. The band has played clubs such as the Cuckoo's Nest (Costa Mesa, Ca.), Godzillas (Sun Valley, Ca.), and Bards Apollo (South Central, Los Angeles). Symbol Six has played with Social Distortion, Bad Religion, T.S.O.L., 45 Grave, Youth Brigade, Descendents, RF7 and Agent Orange.

== History ==
=== First years ===
In December 1981, Robbie Fields, owner and founder of Posh Boy Records, went to a band rehearsal and booked Symbol Six in the studio to record and produce their self-titled debut EP,Symbol Six. The album was recorded at Brian Elliot studios in North Hollywood, California, with engineer David Hines and co-producer Jay Lansford. The album was completed in three days with front cover artwork by Jim Evans of Skateboarder. Back cover photos were taken by music photographer Edward Colver. The EP debuted on KROQ-FM's Rodney Bingenheimer show in April 1982. The album was named a top pick in Billboard Magazine in 1982:

Full of sound and fury is SYMBOL SIX, a new five-man band from Southern California. They play the four songs here with punk exuberance, keeping everything simple but with high excitement quotient.

Symbol Six was distributed world-wide by Green World but the group broke up shortly after the record was released. In 1988, the EP was re-ISSUED on the compilation titled Split, with Agent Orange's album Living in Darkness.

=== Hiatus activity ===
In 1984, Eric Leach and Taz Rudd formed the short-lived Hollywood sleaze band Stahlin with Izzy Stradlin of Guns N' Roses. Shortly afterwards, Leach and Rudd, along with Brent Muscat, Patrick Muzingo, and Todd Muscat, formed the rock n’ roll punk band Shanghai.

The group was spotted by Kim Fowley, producer of The Runaways, Kiss, and Alice Cooper at The Troubadour. Shanghai played the re-opening of the Whisky a Go Go in April 1986 with Guns N' Roses and Faster Pussycat.

Taz Rudd formed the band the Wrecklords consisting of members of Chantee's (Pipeline), Jim Gordon of Derek and the Dominos. He went on to play in Atoms, Der Stab, Funeral, Flower Leperds, Voodoo Church, Decry, Pirates of Venus, Shanghai, Rock City Angels, and Aces & Eights (formed with Phil George and Evan Shanks) which performed at The Viper Room in August 2009 joined on stage by Slash and Steven Adler of Guns N' Roses. Mark Conway is the guitarist of Neighborhood Watch, a Venice California punk band formed in 1983. Rapidfire was a metal band that Mark played guitar in also. Neighborhood Watch is active as of 2021.

=== Reformation ===
The band reformed in 2010 with all the original members. They met at That British Place Rehearsal Studios in Santa Monica and started writing and playing new material. Working with engineer Jimmy Sloan they released their self produced debut LP, Monsters 11 on Symbol Six Music. Donny Brook was soon replaced by Evan Shanks on bass and Mark Conway was replaced by Tony Fate and then by Grey Spikes in 2011. Symbol Six joined The Crowd for Rhino Entertainment - Warner Music Group Posh Boy Night at Rhino Records pop-up store in Los Angeles, California in June 2011 to help raise money for the charitable organization MusiCares.

In 2012, Symbol Six played with acts including Fear, Jello Biafra, Lower Class Brats, and The Adicts. Symbol Six went back into studio with Phillip (Philco) Raves of Mystic Records to record their third album Dirtyland in summer 2012. Symbol Six appeared live in Hollywood on November 15, 2012, with Nick Oliveri of Dwarves (band), Mondo Generator, and Queens of the Stone Age performing Turbonegro's "Back To Dungaree High" In 2011, Dr. Strange Records in Alta Loma, California, negotiated with Posh Boy Records and re-released original and unreleased tracks on 12" vinyl in February 2013. The released album also included a version of The Weirdos' The Hideout. Symbol Six was signed to Jailhouse Records March 1, releasing a compilation split with Fang (band), 2013, a compilation split with Rikk Agnew, 2015 and their third studio album, Dirtyland, in 2014.

== Band members ==
Current members

- Eric Leach - Vocals (1980–1982, 2010–present)
- Phil George - Drums (1980–1982, 2010–present)
- Evan Shanks - Bass (2011–present)
- Tony Fate - Guitar (2011–present)

Former members

- Donny Brook - Bass (1980–1982, 2010–2011)
- Steve Cooper - Guitar (1980–1981)
- Mark Conway - Guitar (1980–1982, 2010–2011)
- Taz Rudd - Guitar (1980, 2010–2014)

== Discography ==
- 1982 Symbol Six Debut EP Catalog #PBS 1030 (Posh Boy Records)
- 1987 The Future Looks Brighter Compilation Catalog #PBS 120 (Posh Boy Records)
- 1988 Living in Darkness Symbol Six Bonus Tracks Catalog #PBCD 88122-2 (Posh Boy Records)
- 1991 Ego/Taxation 7" SINGLE Catalog #PBS 37 (Posh Boy Records)
- 1993 The Posh Boy Story (More Or Less) CD (U.K. Release) Catalog #PBCD 8160 (Posh Boy Records)
- 2010 Monsters 11 (Symbol Six Music)
- 2011 Scare America Records Compilation (Scare America Records)
- 2012 Chaotic Reasoning, Volume One Compilation (Kaos Records)
- 2012 Get Fucked, Let's Rock Compilation (Olystis Music & Production)
- 2012 Underground Comp - Volume I) Compilation (Suicide Kings Records)
- 2013 Dr. Strange Records Re-Release Posh Boy E.P. W/ Bonus Tracks Catalog DSR-128 (Dr Strange Records)
- 2013 Dirty Old Punks Compilation Radio Athens Greece - Volume 2 (Canadian Ensign Records)
- 2013 Jailhouse Records 7" COMP with The Scarred, Violent Affair, & Tenebrae (Jailhouse Records)
- 2014 Symbol Six/Fang (band) Split Release Date April 19, 2014 Catalog #JHR 047 (Jailhouse Records)
- 2014 Dirtyland LP Catalog #JHR 049 (Jailhouse Records)
- 2014 The Posh Boy Story (More Or Less) CD Catalog #8160-2 / Damgood 11 (Damaged Goods Records)
- 2015 Symbol Six/Rikk Agnew Split Catalog #JHR 055 (Jailhouse Records)

== Films ==
1982, Symbol Six was interviewed and performed in the documentary The Slog Movie shot and directed by Dave Markey with Circle One, Wasted Youth, Red Cross, TSOL, The Chiefs, SIN 34, Fear, Circle Jerks, and members of Black Flag.
