= Aaron Boone =

American baseball player & manager (born 1973)

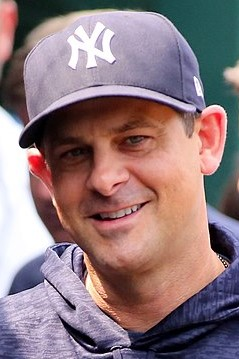
- Boone with the New York Yankees in 2018

New York Yankees – No. 17
- Third baseman / Manager
- Born: March 9, 1973 (age 53); La Mesa, California, U.S.
- Batted: Right Threw: Right

MLB debut
- June 20, 1997, for the Cincinnati Reds

Last MLB appearance
- October 4, 2009, for the Houston Astros

MLB statistics (through July 31, 2026)
- Batting average: .263
- Home runs: 126
- Runs batted in: 555
- Managerial record: 759–545
- Winning %: .582
- Stats at Baseball Reference
- Managerial record at Baseball Reference

Teams
- As player: Cincinnati Reds (1997–2003); New York Yankees (2003); Cleveland Indians (2005–2006); Florida Marlins (2007); Washington Nationals (2008); Houston Astros (2009); As manager: New York Yankees (2018–present)

Career highlights and awards
- All-Star (2003)
Medals
Men's baseball
Representing United States
World Junior Baseball Championship
Bronze medal – third place	1991 Brandon	Team

Aaron John Boone (born March 9, 1973) is an American professional baseball manager and former infielder who is the manager of the New York Yankees of Major League Baseball (MLB). He previously played in MLB for 13 seasons from 1997 to 2009. As a player, Boone is most recognized for his 2003 campaign with the Yankees, during which he hit the winning walk-off home run of the 2003 American League Championship Series.

Following the conclusion of his playing career, Boone was an analyst for ESPN's Sunday Night Baseball and Baseball Tonight from 2010 to 2017. He began serving as the Yankees' manager in 2018, leading the team to the postseason in seven of his eight seasons and one World Series appearance in 2024.

== Early life ==
Aaron John Boone was born on March 9, 1973, in La Mesa, California. Boone attended Villa Park High School in Villa Park, California. He batted .423 with 22 stolen bases for the school's baseball team in his senior year, and was named the Century League's co-player of the year. The California Angels selected Boone on the third day of the 1991 MLB draft, but he had no intention to sign a professional contract.

== College career ==
He attended the University of Southern California (USC) and played college baseball for the USC Trojans. In 1993, he played collegiate summer baseball for the Orleans Cardinals of the Cape Cod Baseball League, where he was named a league all-star and helped lead Orleans to the league championship.

== Professional career ==
=== Cincinnati Reds (1997–2003) ===
The Cincinnati Reds selected Boone in the third round of the 1994 MLB draft. Boone made his MLB debut in June 1997, and was ejected from the game after being called out sliding into home. On the last day of the 1998 season, the Reds started the only MLB infield composed of two sets of brothers: first baseman Stephen Larkin, second baseman Bret Boone, shortstop Barry Larkin, and third baseman Aaron Boone.

On September 22, 2002, Boone hit the last home run in Riverfront Stadium in the eighth inning of the Reds' 4–3 loss to the Philadelphia Phillies, a solo home run off reliever Dan Plesac. Boone hit a career-high 26 home runs in 2002, playing in all 162 games. The Reds named Boone their team's most valuable player. He appeared in the 2003 MLB All-Star Game.

=== New York Yankees (2003) ===
The New York Yankees acquired Boone from the Reds for Brandon Claussen, Charlie Manning, and cash on July 31, 2003. In 54 games after the trade, he hit .254 with a .720 OPS, six home runs and 31 RBIs.

During Game 7 of the 2003 American League Championship Series (ALCS), Boone hit a walk-off home run in the 11th inning, off Tim Wakefield, which gave the Yankees a 6–5 victory over the Boston Red Sox, thus prolonging the Curse of the Bambino. The New York Daily News dubbed the play the "Curse of the Boonebino". This home run was rated the ninth-best home run of all time on Baseball Tonight. Afterward, some Red Sox fans called Boone "Aaron Fucking Boone," much as they called Bucky Dent "Bucky Fucking Dent."

In January 2004, Boone tore the anterior cruciate ligament in his left knee during a pick-up basketball game. The game violated the standard MLB player contract, which forbids taking part in off-season basketball, skiing, and surfing. The Yankees immediately hinted that they would terminate his contract. Soon after trading for Alex Rodriguez to play third base, the Yankees released Boone on February 27, 2004.

=== Cleveland Indians (2005–2006) ===
Boone signed a two-year contract with the Cleveland Indians in June 2004. He earned $600,000 for 2004, $3 million for the 2005 season, and a club option for the 2006 season worth $4.5 million. After missing the entire 2004 season, Boone played 154 games in 2005. He batted .243 with 16 home runs and 60 RBIs. The Indians exercised an option on Boone's contract for the 2006 season. In his second season with Cleveland, he batted .251 with seven home runs.

=== Florida Marlins (2007) ===
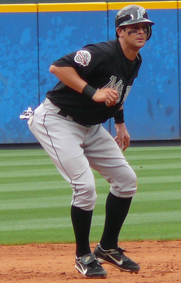
Boone with the Marlins in 2007

On December 29, 2006, Boone signed a one-year contract with the Florida Marlins worth $925,000. He batted .286 in 69 games for the Marlins in 2007.

=== Washington Nationals (2008) ===
On December 6, 2007, Boone signed a one-year, $1,000,000 contract with the Washington Nationals. In 104 games, Boone hit .241 with 6 home runs and 28 RBIs in 2008.

=== Houston Astros (2009) ===
On December 18, 2008, Boone signed a one-year $750,000, plus incentives, deal with the Houston Astros. He played in only 10 games in 2009, reaching base only once—on a hit by pitch—in 14 plate appearances.

In March 2009, Boone underwent open-heart surgery to replace a bicuspid aortic valve, a condition that he has been aware of since childhood, but which routine tests indicated had recently worsened. Boone stated that doctors told him he could play baseball when he recovered, but he was not sure if he would choose to do so. Boone returned to baseball on August 10, when he began his rehabilitation with the Corpus Christi Hooks, the Astros' Double-A minor league affiliate. He played five innings and was hitless in two plate appearances. Boone stated after the game that his goal was to return to the major leagues by September 1, the date that major league rosters expand. Boone was activated on September 1, and added to the Astros' expanded roster. On September 2, Boone made his season debut, playing at first base and going 0 for 3. On September 16, Boone stated that he was leaning towards retirement, and on October 4, he played his last game.

== Broadcasting career ==
Boone served as a guest analyst for the MLB Network coverage of the 2009 ALCS between the New York Yankees and Los Angeles Angels of Anaheim.

On February 23, 2010, Boone announced his retirement and that he would become an analyst for ESPN. Boone appeared on Monday Night Baseball and for Baseball Tonight's pregame show on Sunday night. Boone called the 2014 and 2015 World Series for ESPN Radio with play-by-play announcer Dan Shulman. Jessica Mendoza and he became color commentators on Sunday Night Baseball with Shulman in 2016. Boone and Shulman continued to call World Series games for ESPN Radio through 2017.

== Managerial career ==
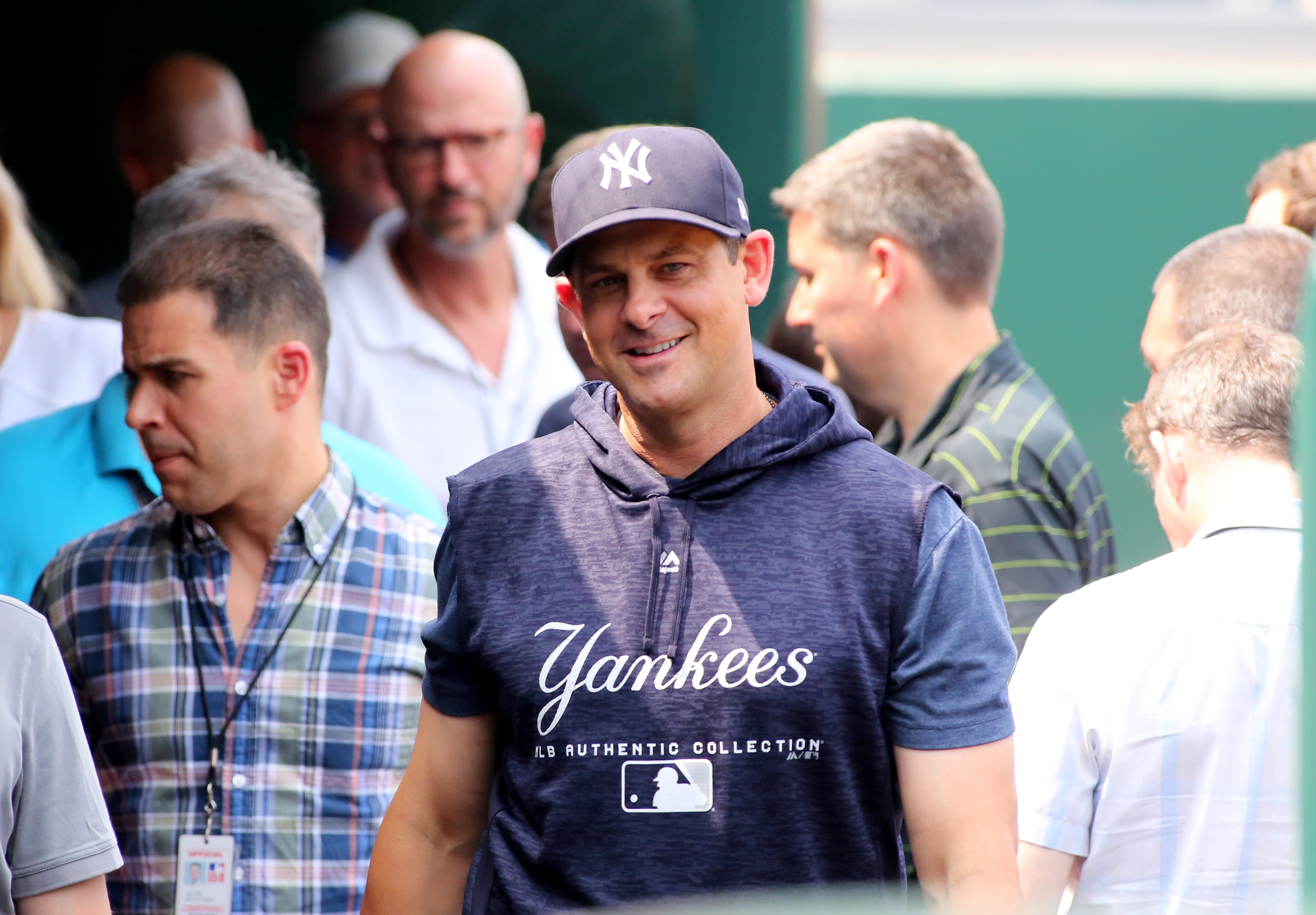
Boone in June 2018

=== 2018 season ===
After the 2017 season, the Yankees decided not to retain Joe Girardi as their manager; they hired Boone to succeed him on December 4, 2017. The Yankees started the 2018 season with a 6–1 win against the Toronto Blue Jays on March 29, 2018. On September 2, 2018, Boone was suspended for one game for making illegal contact with an umpire. He finished his first season with a 100–62 record, good for second in the American League East, and led the Yankees to the wild card game against the Oakland Athletics, despite losing star outfielder and team leader Aaron Judge for two months with a wrist injury. On October 3, 2018, the Yankees defeated the Athletics 7–2 to advance to the American League Division Series, giving Boone his first postseason win as a manager. The Boston Red Sox eliminated the New York Yankees three–games–to–one in the American League Division Series en route to a World Series victory.

=== 2019 season ===
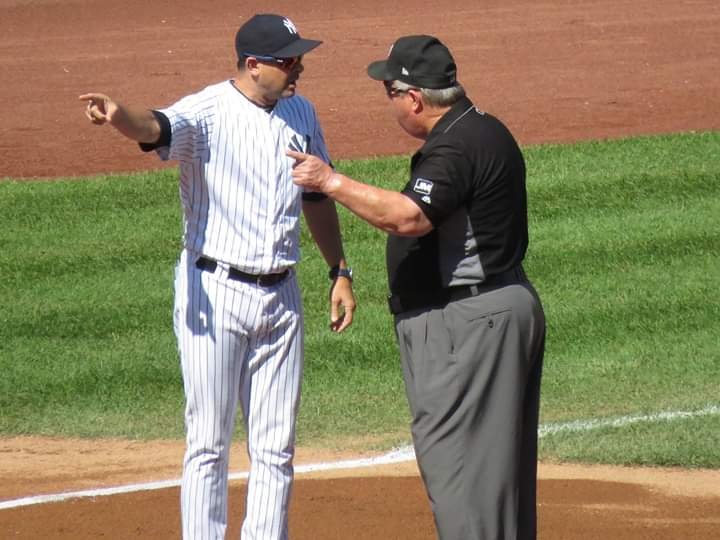
Boone arguing with Joe West in 2019

The Yankees started the 2019 season with a 7–2 win against the Baltimore Orioles on March 28, 2019. On September 19, after winning against the Los Angeles Angels 9–1, the Yankees clinched the American League East, becoming AL East Division Champions for the first time since 2012 and also earning their 100th win. Boone became the first manager in MLB history to have 100 or more wins in each of his first two seasons. The Yankees went on to lose to the Houston Astros in the American League Championship Series.

Following the 2019 season, Boone was named a finalist for American League Manager of the Year award. He finished runner-up to Minnesota Twins manager, Rocco Baldelli.

=== 2020 season ===
Due to the COVID-19 pandemic, the Yankees and the other 29 Major League Baseball teams only played a 60-game regular season. The Yankees started off the shortened season with a hot 16–6 start, but then lost 15 of their next 20 games, evening their record at 21–21. The Yankees then won 10 straight to finish the season second in their division with a 33–27 record, seven games behind the division-champion Tampa Bay Rays, who they lost eight of 10 games to in the regular season, in the AL East, but good enough for the fifth seed in the American League due to MLB's postseason expansion for the season. The Yankees swept the Cleveland Indians in a best-of-three wild card series to advance to the ALDS against the Tampa Bay Rays, but their struggles against the Rays continued, as they were eliminated in five games.

=== 2021 season ===
During the 2021 season, the Yankees had what was called one of the "streakiest [teams] in recent memory. Through July 4, the team struggled to a 41–41 record with half of the season left to play, then went on a 51–29 run to end the season at 92–70. Between August 14 and 28, the Yankees won 13 consecutive games, tied for fifth-longest in franchise history. Following the winning streak, the team stumbled, going 3–12 between August 28 and September 12, and finished tied for second in the American League East behind the Tampa Bay Rays, but lost the wild card game to the Boston Red Sox 6–2.

Following the season, Boone signed a three-year contract with the Yankees with a club option for 2025.

=== 2022 season ===
In 2022, Boone was ejected from nine games. He was ejected four times more often than any other MLB manager. The Yankees were 64–28 in the first half of the season by the All-Star Game and potentially headed to 100 wins. They proceeded to win 35 of their next 70 games to finish with a 99–63 record and an AL East title. They earned home-field advantage in Games 1, 2, and 5 of the ALDS. They beat the Cleveland Guardians in five games, but got swept by the Houston Astros in the ALCS, marking Boone's fifth-straight playoff exit.

=== 2023 season ===
MLB suspended Boone for one game on May 26, 2023, for his conduct towards umpires after his fourth ejection of the season, and second in four days, the prior day. As of June 9, Boone has the third-highest ejection rate in MLB history among managers, behind only Paul Richards and Frankie Frisch, and ahead of Earl Weaver, Bobby Cox, and Ron Gardenhire, managers who were all known for their proclivity for getting ejected.

On September 24, 2023, the Yankees were eliminated from playoff contention for the first time under Boone's management. The team finished the season 82–80.

=== 2024 season ===
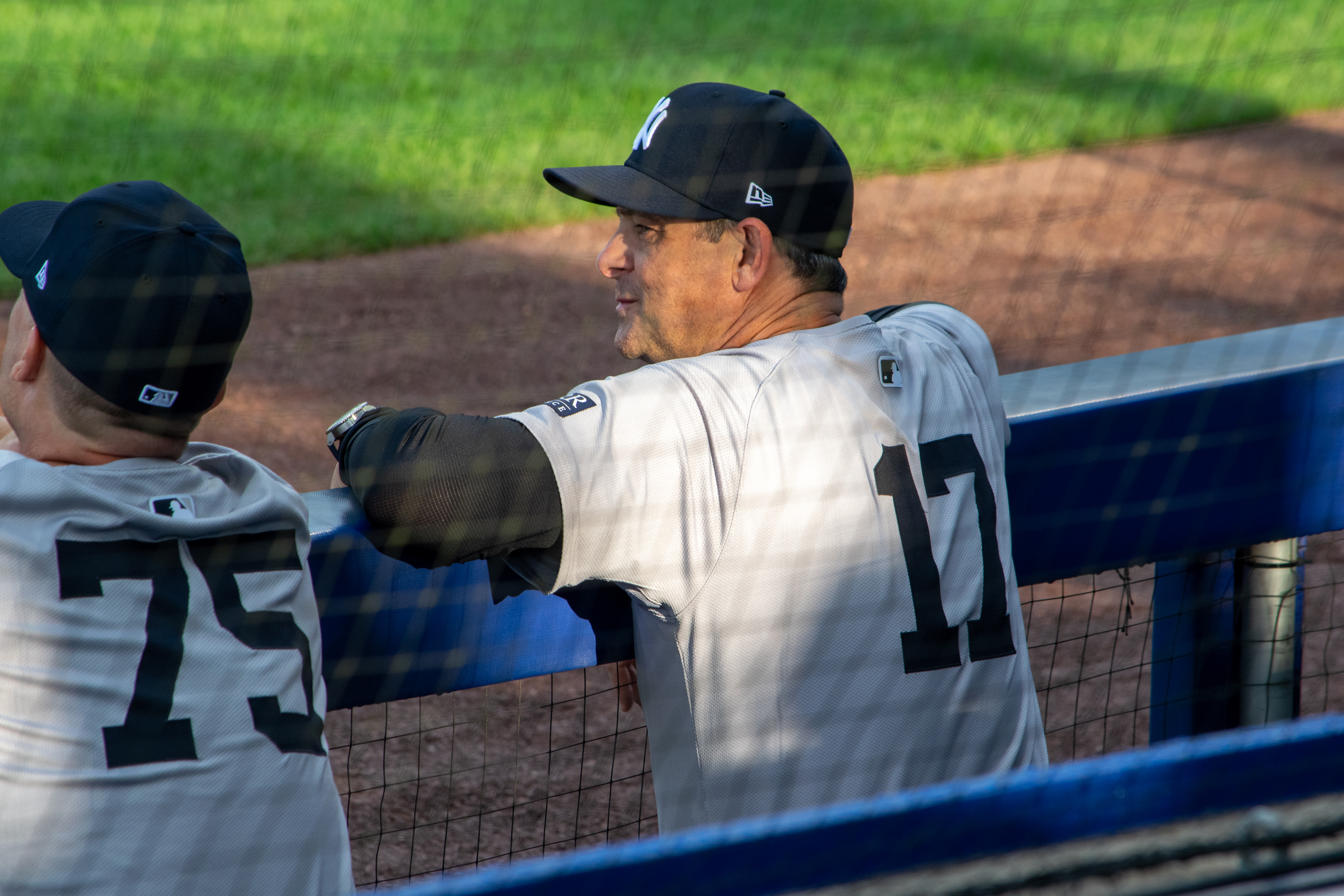
Boone in 2024

The Yankees finished the season first in the American League East at 94–68, beat the Kansas City Royals in four games in the ALDS and Cleveland Guardians in five games in the ALCS for their first AL Pennant and World Series appearance since 2009, where they subsequently lost to the Los Angeles Dodgers in five games. On November 8, 2024, the Yankees exercised the 2025 option clause for Boone.

=== 2025 season ===
Before the 2025 regular season began, Boone and the Yankees agreed to a two-year contract extension through 2027.

The Yankees finished second in the AL East with a 94–68 record, narrowly behind the Toronto Blue Jays, who held the tiebreaker. They advanced past the Boston Red Sox by winning the Wild Card Series 2–1. They would go on to lose the Division Series to the Toronto Blue Jays 3–1.

=== Managerial record ===
As of October 7, 2026

Team	Year	Regular season					Postseason			
Team	Year	Games	Won	Lost	Win %	Finish	Won	Lost	Win %	Result
NYY	2018	162	100	62	.617	2nd in AL East	2	3	.400	Lost ALDS (BOS)
NYY	2019	162	103	59	.636	1st in AL East	5	4	.556	Lost ALCS (HOU)
NYY	2020	60	33	27	.550	2nd in AL East	4	3	.571	Lost ALDS (TB)
NYY	2021	162	92	70	.568	3rd in AL East	0	1	.000	Lost ALWC (BOS)
NYY	2022	162	99	63	.611	1st in AL East	3	6	.333	Lost ALCS (HOU)
NYY	2023	162	82	80	.506	4th in AL East	–	–	–	–
NYY	2024	162	94	68	.580	1st in AL East	8	6	.571	Lost World Series (LAD)
NYY	2025	162	94	68	.580	2nd in AL East	3	4	.429	Lost ALDS (TOR）
NYY	2026	161	93	68	.578	2nd in AL East	2	3	.400	Lost ALDS (TB)
Total		1,355	790	565	.583		27	30	.473	

== Personal life ==
Boone is the son of former catcher and manager Bob Boone, the brother of All Star and four-time Gold Glove winner and current Texas Rangers hitting coach Bret Boone, the brother of former Cincinnati Reds minor leaguer Matt Boone, and the grandson of former major leaguer Ray Boone. As children, Aaron and Bret spent time in the Phillies clubhouse with fellow sons of other major league players, including Pete Rose Jr. Boone is a descendant of pioneer Daniel Boone. Boone is a fan of the Philadelphia Eagles football team.

Boone's wife, Laura Cover, was a Playboy Playmate (Miss October 1998). Boone lived in Scottsdale, Arizona until becoming Yankees manager, when he moved to Greenwich, Connecticut. Boone and Cover have four children—two biological children and two adopted.

Boone had open-heart surgery in 2009 and had surgery to implant a pacemaker in March 2021. Boone was quoted as feeling "awesome" after being on the bench for two weeks following the procedure.

== See also ==
- Third-generation Major League Baseball families
