= Von Franco =

- Born: San Jose, CA
- Education: Self-taught
- Movement: Lowbrow, Kustom Kulture

Von Franco (born May 29, 1952) is a self-taught American artist associated with the Lowbrow art movement and Kustom Kulture. He became involved at an early age in the burgeoning hot rod and Kustom Kulture scene of Southern California. His skill at drawing hot rod and monster art, popular in Kustom Kulture, caught the attention of Ed "Big Daddy" Roth, for whom Von Franco later worked. Von Franco became a builder of custom automobiles, gaining notoriety for building clones of Norm Grabowski's Kookie, Kookie II and Lightning Bug t-buckets, as well as a clone/expansion of the Golden Rod. Von Franco is also known for his distinctive pinstriping and hand-lettering techniques. He was also the guitarist in the surf band The Bomboras and played the vibraphone in The Hyperions.

He designed two bicycles for GT Bicycles, The Von Franco (orange) and the Taboo Tiki.

He is a member of the Beatniks Koolsville car club.

Von Franco was featured in the 1995 documentary Desperate Generation and is the subject of the biographical documentaries I Was a Teenage Monster Shirt Painter and "The Car That Ate My Brain" and featured in the Kustom Kulture documentary Flake and Flames. He is featured on the cover and interior of My Freedamn! Volume 6, a vintage collectibles series by Rin Tanaka.

35 of his airbrushed sweatshirts were promoted by Levi's "Kustom Monster" in a multinational clothing tour.
