= Marlene Sandoval =

American-born Mexican footballer

Personal information
- Full name: Rubí Marlene Sandoval Nungaray
- Date of birth: 18 January 1984 (age 42)
- Place of birth: Santa Ana, California, U.S.
- Height: 5 ft 9 in (1.75 m)
- Position: Defender

Youth career
- Valencia High School
- 2002–2005: Cal State Fullerton Titans

Senior career*
Years	Team	Apps	(Gls)
2012	Santa Clarita Blue Heat	3	(0)

International career
2002–2011	Mexico	85	(5)
- * Club domestic league appearances and goals

Rubí Marlene Sandoval Nungaray (born January 18, 1984) is an American-born Mexican former football defender and member of the Mexico women's national football team. She was allocated to the Portland Thorns FC for the NWSL league, but later removed by the Mexican Football Federation due to injury.

== Early life ==
Sandoval was born in Santa Ana, California. She holds citizenship in both the U.S. and Mexico.

Sandoval attended Valencia High School in Placentia, California, where she was a two-time first-team all-league selection, a two-time league MVP and a two-time All-CIF selection as a sophomore and junior. She was also a two-time all-league selection and an All-CIF selection in volleyball.

=== Cal State Fullerton ===
Sandoval attended California State University, Fullerton and majored in kinesiology.

During her senior year, she helped the Titans finish with a school-record 19 wins and a trip to the "Sweet 16" of the NCAA Tournament following wins over UNLV and USC. She started 22 of 23 matches, finishing with four goals and three assists to stand tied for fifth on the team in scoring (11 points). She was named NSCAA Second-Team All-American, an NSCAA First-Team All-West Region selection, and earned second-team All-America honors from Soccer Buzz and SoccerTimes.com. She was also named Big West Conference Defensive Player of the Year. She was twice named Big West Player of the Week. She set the foundation of the defensive lineup that helped Fullerton set school records for fewest goals allowed (15), fewest shots allowed (161) and most shutouts (12). Sandoval finished her college career with 71 appearances, eight goals, and seven assists.

== Playing career ==
=== International ===
In 2003, Sandoval scored a goal for Mexico in a Women's World Cup qualifier against Japan and won a bronze medal at the Pan American Games in the Dominican Republic. She also scored a goal with Mexico in a 5–1 win over Panama at the 2002 Gold Cup and competed for Mexico's U-19 squad at the Youth World Cup in Canada in the summer of 2002. Sandoval also competed for Mexico at the 2004 Summer Olympics in Athens, Greece, where she finished in 8th place with the Mexico women's national football team. She was also a member of Mexico's 2011 FIFA Women's World Cup squad. Overall, she has earned 85 caps and scored 5 goals with the Mexico national team.

=== Club ===
In 2012, Sandoval was signed by the Santa Clarita Blue Heat of the now-defunct USL W-League.

==== Portland Thorns FC ====
In January 2013, Sandoval was included in a list of 55 players from the U.S., Canada, and Mexico national teams that were allocated to the eight teams in the new National Women's Soccer League. Sandoval was allocated to Portland Thorns FC, but was later removed by the Mexican Football Federation due to injury.
