= Cavaliere (surname) =

Cavaliere, the Italian word for "knight" and a common surname, can refer to:

- Alik Cavaliere (1926–1998), Italian sculptor
- Felix Cavaliere (1944), American singer, songwriter, record producer, and musician
- Jake Cavaliere (1972), American musician, singer, songwriter, producer and tattoo artist
- Léopold Cavalière (1996), French basketball player
- Massimo Cavaliere (1962), Italian fencer
- Nicholas Cavaliere (1899–1995), American cinematographer
