= Zombie-A-Go-Go Records =

- Founder: Rob Zombie
- Distributor: Geffen Records
- Genre: Surf; psychobilly
- Country of origin: United States

Zombie A Go-Go Records is the music artist and film director Rob Zombie's record label. It has released CDs from such artists as The Bomboras and The Ghastly Ones, together with the compilation CD of various artists - Halloween Hootenanny.

== History ==
Rob Zombie started Zombie A Go-Go after watching a performance by The Ghastly Ones upon returning from a tour with his band White Zombie. The first albums released under Zombie's label were Head Shrinkin' Fun by The Bomboras and A Haunting We Will Go-Go by The Ghastly Ones in June 1998.

== Albums ==
The label, a subsidiary of Geffen Records, released the following albums:

- Head Shrinkin' Fun (1998) by the Bomboras
- A-Haunting We Will Go-Go (1998) by the Ghastly Ones
- Halloween Hootenanny (1998), a compilation with tracks by Rob Zombie, Reverend Horton Heat, the Bomboras, Southern Culture On The Skids, Satan's Pilgrims, Frenchy, Rocket From The Crypt, The Amazing (Royal) Crowns, Los Straitjackets, Swingin Neckbreakers, The Phantom Surfers, Deadbolt, Dead Elvi, The Born Losers, The Legendary Invisible Men, Davie Allan, the Ghastly Ones, and television horror host Zacherle.
- Rob Zombie Presents The Words & The Music Of Frankenstein (1999)
- Rob Zombie Presents: Captain Clegg and the Night Creatures (2009).
