= Deke Dickerson =

American singer, guitarist, composer, and writer (born 1968)

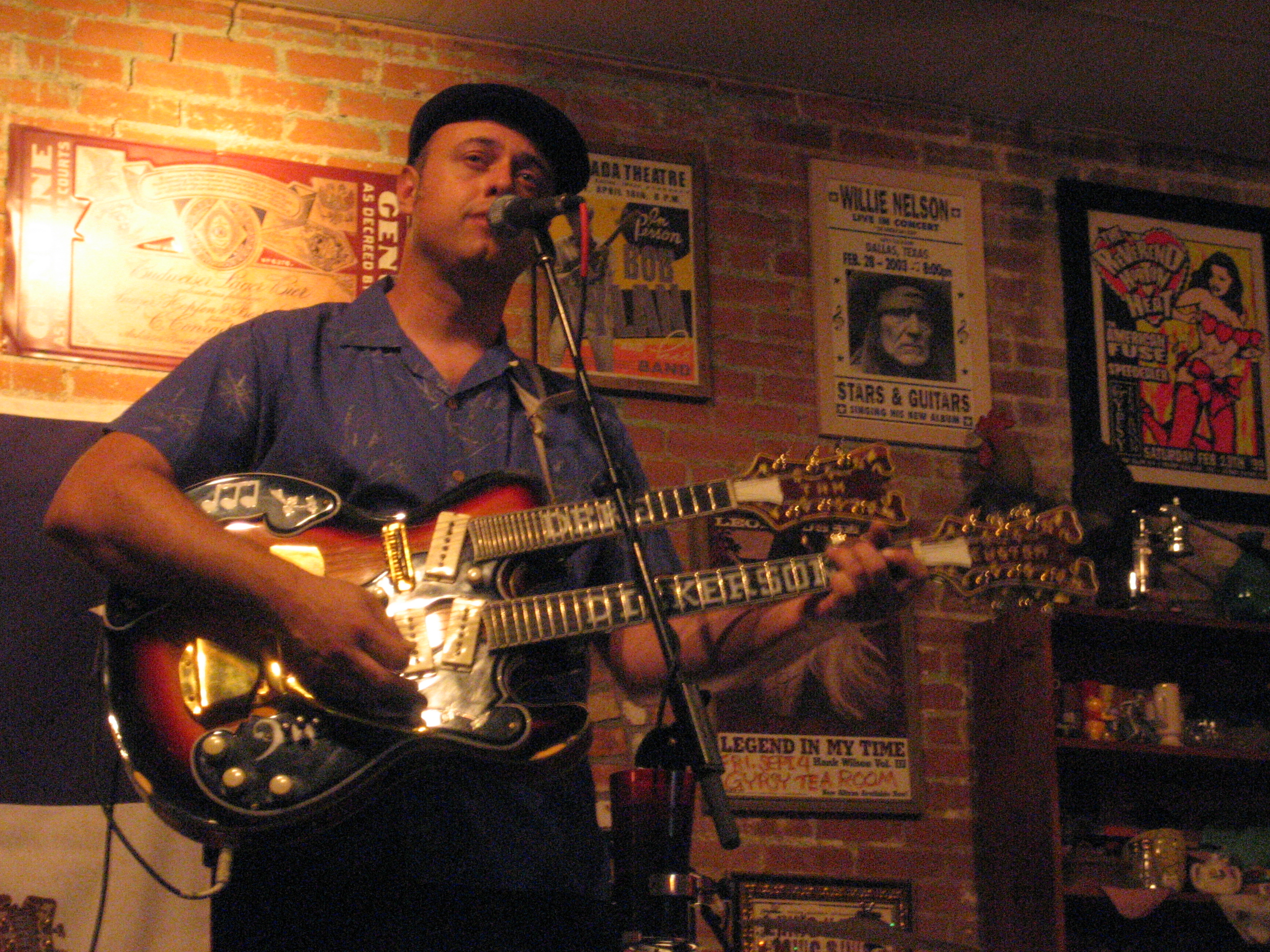
- Deke Dickerson in 2008.

Background information
- Also known as: "Blind" Rage, The Olde Lamplighter, The Donut Prince
- Born: Derek Dickerson; June 3, 1968 (age 58); St. Louis, Missouri, United States
- Genres: Rockabilly; Rock 'N' Roll; Country; Hillbilly; Jug Band; Blues; Rock
- Occupations: Musician; Writer
- Instruments: Guitar; Vocals
- Years active: 1985–present
- Labels: Estrus, Ecco-Fonic, Spinout, Hightone, Major Label, Sleazy, Yep Roc, Gas, Preston, Shove, Part, Retroworld, Muleskinner, Goofin', Muddy Roots Music, Rock & Roll Inc., Retro Recording Services
- Member of: Deke Dickerson and the Whippersnappers
- Formerly of: The Untamed Youth, The Ecco-Fonics, Dave & Deke Combo, The Go-Nuts
- Website: dekedickerson.com

Derek "Deke" Dickerson (born 1968) is an American singer, songwriter, guitarist, film composer, and writer. His style incorporates country, alternative country, rockabilly, hillbilly, blues, western swing and rock 'n' roll.

== Biography ==
Dickerson was born in St. Louis, Missouri, but grew up in Columbia. He moved to Los Angeles, California, in 1991. He is known as an avid collector of vintage vinyl records. As of 2025, Dickerson still lives in Los Angeles.

=== Music ===
After playing in several local rockabilly bands as a teenager, Dickerson formed The Untamed Youth at age 17 in his hometown of Columbia. The Untamed Youth have periodically reunited for live shows. In 1991 Dickerson moved to Los Angeles and joined Dave Stuckey to form the Dave & Deke Combo, a partnership that yielded two albums and a 2005 reunion at major rockabilly festivals. Joining the Ecco-Fonics in 1998, Dickerson toured, signed to HighTone Records and released three albums for the label. In 1994 he formed a novelty "snack rock" band called The Go-Nuts with members of The Phantom Surfers and The Bomboras. Dickerson’s most recent band venture is Deke Dickerson and the Whippersnappers. He also performs and tours regularly as a solo artist, and has played with rockabilly legends such as Sonny Burgess, Scotty Moore and Duane Eddy.

The Reverend Horton Heat has stated that, "Deke Dickerson is the best rockabilly guitarist in the world!" In 2019 Dickerson won the Ameripolitan Music Award for Musician of the Year. He has performed at The Country Music Hall of Fame.

Dickerson partnered with Hallmark Guitars to produce the Deke Dickerson model guitar. He owns a Ray Butts EchoSonic, serial number 24, a rare amplifier with built-in tape echo that used to belong to Scotty Moore. In 2018, Dickerson composed the soundtrack for the film Action Point. Dickerson also organizes an annual "Guitar Geek Festival" held in Anaheim, California, every January, during the NAMM Show.

=== Writing ===
Dickerson writes a regular column in Guitar Player magazine, and feature articles in Vintage Guitar magazine and The Fretboard Journal. He has also written for the punk culture website Please Kill Me. Dickerson is the author of Sixteen Tons: The Merle Travis Story, the first-ever full-length biography devoted to Country Music Hall of Fame member Merle Travis. Dickerson has also had two books published by Voyageur Press, The Strat in the Attic and The Strat in the Attic 2. He also authored a guide to Los Angeles' rock n' roll history, titled Boss Angeles!: A Map and Guide to LA Rock 'n' Roll Landmarks 1955-1965. Dickerson has also contributed liner notes to reissue projects for such labels as Capitol, RCA, Bear Family, and Sundazed.
