= Josh Samuels =

American water polo player (born 1991)

Personal information
- Full name: Joshua Martin Kugler Samuels
- Born: 8 July 1991 (age 34) Newport Beach, California
- Height: 193 cm (6 ft 4 in)
- Weight: 93 kg (205 lb)

Sport
- Sport: Water polo
- Club: New York Athletic Club
Medal record
Representing United States
Pan American Games
Gold medal – first place	2015 Toronto	team

Joshua Martin Kugler Samuels (born 8 July 1991) is a water polo player from the United States. He played for the United States men's national water polo team that won a gold medal in water polo at the 2015 Pan American Games, and competed for the team in the 2016 Summer Olympics, which finished in tenth place.

In high school, he was the 2008 Orange County Register Boys Water Polo Player of the Year, 2009 Century League Male Athlete of the Year, Century League Player of the Year in 2007 and 2008, and 2009 Orange County Register Male Athlete of the Year. In college at UCLA, he scored 176 career goals for the water polo team, 3rd all-time at the school.

== Personal life ==
Samuels was born in Newport Beach, California, lives in Villa Park, California, and is Jewish. His parents are Elizabeth Kugler (who played softball for U.C. Berkeley and U.C. Davis) and Martin Samuels. He has an older brother, Albert (who competed for the Loyola Marymount men's water polo team), and older sister, Angela (who competed for the Loyola Marymount women's swimming team). He now works as an associate for Orion Property Partners.

== Water polo career ==
=== High school ===
Samuels attended Villa Park High School in Orange County. There, playing water polo, he was the 2008 Orange County Register Boys Water Polo Player of the Year, 2009 Century League Male Athlete of the Year, Century League Player of the Year in 2007 and 2008, 2009 Orange County Register Male Athlete of the Year, first-team All-County, first-team California-Hawaii All-America, and National Interscholastic Swim Coaches Association (NISCA) All-America in 2006, 2007, and 2008, and 2008 All-California Interscholastic Federation (CIF) Division II co-MVP. He was a two-year team captain, and ended his career as Villa Park's all-time leading scorer (408 career goals) and with the school record for career assists (541).

On the school swimming team, Samuels was captain of the team for two years and was Century League MVP in 2008 and 2009, the 2009 CIF Division II 50 m freestyle champion, and NISCA All-American in the 50 and 100 freestyle in 2009, and set the school record in the 50 freestyle (20.71 seconds). In basketball, he also played two seasons for the school team. In college at UCLA he scored 176 career goals for the water polo team, 3rd all-time at the school.

=== College ===
Samuels attended UCLA ('13), where he studied Political Science and played for the UCLA Bruins water polo team. He scored 176 career goals for the water polo team, 3rd all-time at the school. In his sophomore year in 2010 he was named an honorable mention Association of Collegiate Water Polo Coaches (ACWPC) All-American, in his junior year in 2011 he was named a first-team ACWPC All-American and a second-team All-Mountain Pacific Sports Federation (MPSF) selection, and in his senior year in 2012 he was named a first-team All-MPSF selection. His 2012 season total of 68 goals was the 8th-highest ever for the school, and that season he received the school's Jack Bariteau Most Inspirational Award.

=== National team ===
Samuels played for the U.S. Junior National Team from 2004-09 (Cadet, Youth, and Junior National Teams), was a three-year team captain, and helped the USA Men's Junior National Team win the gold medal at the 2008 Junior Pan-American Games.

He played for the United States men's national water polo team in the 2014 FINA World Cup, where the team came in 4th, the 2014 FINA World League Super Final (5th), the 2015 FINA Men's Water Polo World League Super Final (4th), and the 2016 FINA World League Super Final (silver medal).

Samuels played for Team USA as a "driver" at the 2015 World Championships (where the team came in 7th), and in water polo at the 2015 Pan American Games (where the team won a gold medal).

He was part of the American team at the 2016 Summer Olympics in water polo, which finished in tenth place.

=== International ===
Samuels competed professionally in the Italian Series A League for SS Lazio, and in the Regional Water Polo League for VK Budva.

=== Honors ===
In 2018 Samuels was inducted into the Southern California Jewish Sports Hall of Fame.
