= Century Conference =

The Century Conference is a co-operative group of California high school athletic leagues that formerly made up the Century League. Its member schools now comprise the Crestview League and the North Hills League. It is part of the CIF Southern Section. Members are located in Orange County. (New member schools not qualified for league play until 2024 season.)

== Members ==
- Brea Olinda High School
- Canyon High School
- Crean Lutheran High School
- Cypress High School
- El Dorado High School
- El Modena High School
- Esperanza High School
- Foothill High School
- La Habra High School
- Pacifica High School
- Sonora High School
- Sunny Hills High School
- Troy High School
- Villa Park High School
- Yorba Linda High School
