= The Go-Nuts =

American novelty band

- Origin: San Francisco, California, USA
- Genres: Novelty, Bubblegum, Rock, Pop Punk
- Years active: 1994–2016
- Labels: Planet Pimp Records, Lookout! Records, Estrus Records
- Members: Deke Dickerson, Jake Cavaliere, Mel Bergman, Russell Quan, et al.

The Go-Nuts (not to be confused with a 1960s garage rock band of the same name), were a novelty band from San Francisco, California, active in the 1990s and early 2000s, which was composed of members of The Ecco-Fonics, The Phantom Surfers, and The Bomboras. The band's schtick was that they were four superheroes: Kap'n Korn-nut (Mel Bergman), the Donut Prince (Deke Dickerson), the Donut Hole (Jake Cavaliere), and the Korn Dogg (Russell Quan, et al.), who—along with their Go-Go Gorillas sidekicks—attempted to make the world "safe for snacking."

Members of the Go-Nuts all wore spandex bodysuits and helmets or masks adorned with real donuts and other snack food items. Their music (which they dubbed "snak rock") was a mix of rock, bubblegum, and pop punk, with rockabilly and rock n' roll influences. The lyrics to Go-Nuts songs were mostly about junk food, snacking, the Go-Nuts as superheroes, the band's sidekicks the Go-Go Gorillas, and the glorification of overeating and obesity (the band paid homage to Robert Earl Hughes, the heaviest human being recorded during his lifetime, with an eponymous single).

All of The Go-Nuts' recordings featured a rendition (or multiple renditions) of their song "Go-Nuts Theme" which declared repeatedly, "The Go-Nuts are your favorite band." Their second album featured a cover of Van Halen's "Hot for Teacher," restyled as "Hot for Twinkies." At Go-Nuts live shows, audiences were assaulted by airborne food items projected from the stage by various launching devices such as the "Snak Storm" and "Snak Cannon" – often creating major messes at venues and leading to the band being banned from various clubs in California.

The Go-Nuts' music was released by Estrus Records, Planet Pimp Records, and Lookout! Records. The band released two full-length albums, three 7" vinyl singles, and appeared on multiple compilations. The Go-Nuts logo and most of the band's merchandise (t-shirts, buttons, coffee mugs, et cetera) were designed or illustrated by the hot rod and pinup artist Coop.

The Go-Nuts were active in the 1990s but have not released any new music since 2000. They periodically re-form to perform one-off appearances at music festivals such as Spain's Funtastic Drácula Carnival, but are not a regular touring live act. In 2013 they performed at a benefit for Norton Records, at Los Angeles venue The Echo. Their most recent documented performance appears to have occurred on August 27, 2016. The Go-Nuts' use of costumes has been cited as an influence on The Aquabats.

As of early 2026, The Go-Nuts' music does not appear to be available on any major streaming platforms, or even on the artist-focused platform Bandcamp; however, selected Go-Nuts tracks have been uploaded to YouTube.

== Discography ==
=== 7" vinyl singles ===
- Go Nuts With... The Go-Nuts!!, Estrus Records,1994.
- The Donut Prince And The Pauper, Planet Pimp Records, 1995.
- Robert Earl Hughes, Lookout! Records, 1997.

=== Full-length albums ===
- World's Greatest Super Hero Snak Rock And Gorilla Entertainment Revue, Planet Pimp Records, 1997.
- Dunk And Cover!, Lookout! Records, 2000.

=== Compilation appearances ===
- Goode Tyme Jhambhoree, Planet Pimp Records, 1995.
- Happy Birthday, Baby Jesus (Volumes 1 & 2), Sympathy For The Record Industry, 1995.
- (You're Only As Good As) The Last Great Thing You Did, Lookout! Records, 1997.
- Tigermask: Trash Au Go-Go, Dionysus Records, 1998.
- Lookout! Freakout Episode 2, Lookout! Records, 2001.
- Greasy Kid Stuff: Songs From Inside The Radio, Confidential Recordings, 2002.
