= The Lords of Altamont =

American rock band

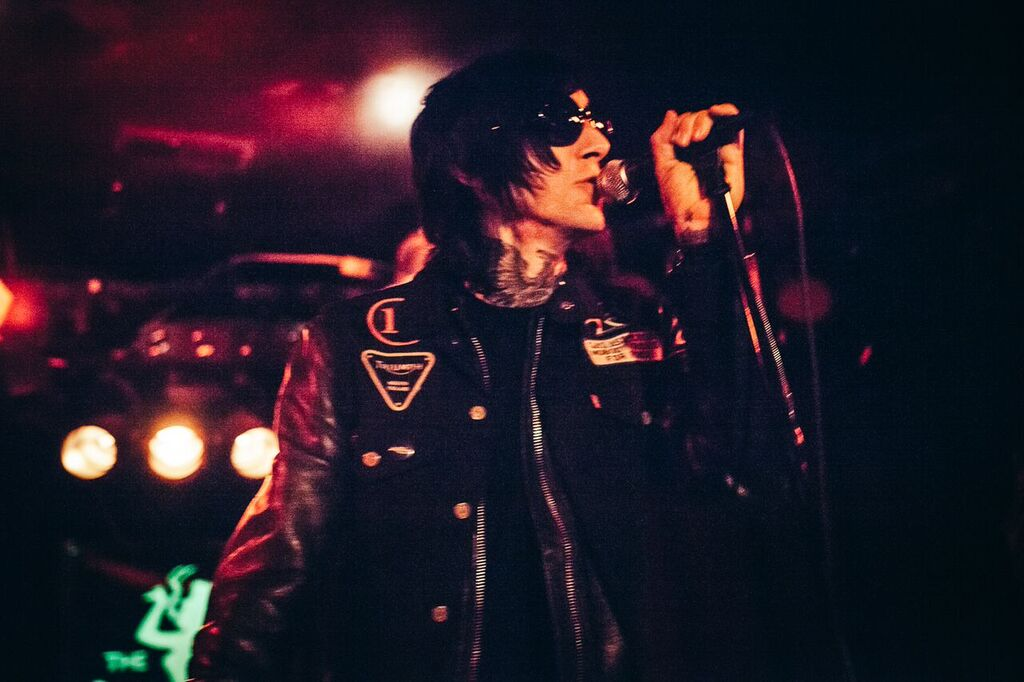
- Singer Jake Cavaliere performing in December 2015

Background information
- Origin: Los Angeles, California
- Genres: Garage rock, psychedelic rock
- Years active: 2000–present
- Label: Heavy Psych Sounds
- Members: Jake "The Preacher" Cavaliere – vocals, organ Dani Sin – guitar Rob Zim – bass Barry "the Hatchet" van Esbroek – drums
- Past members: John "Big Drag" Saletra; Shawn "Sonic" Medina; Harry " Full Tilt" Drumdini; Johnny "Stiggs" Devilla; Spencer "Dirty" Robinson; Kevin "The Phantom" Starr; Michael Davis
- Website: lordsofaltamont.com

The Lords of Altamont are a rock band from Los Angeles, California. The band mixes the sounds of '60s garage and psychedelic rock, American punk rock, British rhythm and blues and glam combined with B-movie biker exploitation imagery. Past and present line-ups of The Lords of Altamont have included members of The Bomboras, The Fuzztones, The MC5 and The Cramps. As of 2017 the band has released six albums on various labels including the newest, To Hell With Tomorrow, Lords Are Now, on Heavy Psych Sounds Records.

== Background ==
The current lineup consists of Jake "The Preacher" Cavaliere, lead vocalist and Farfisa organ, Dani Sin, guitar, Rob "The Garbageman" Zim, bass guitar, and Barry 'the Hatchet' van Esbroek on drums.

The story of the band has its proper start in late 1999. Veterans of the SoCal music scene Jake Cavaliere and Johnny Devilla, late of the instro/surf juggernaut The Bomboras, were looking to form something new. Max Eidson, Doran Shelley, and Gabriel Hammond rounded out the original lineup known as "The First Five". Their first show was at The Garage in Hollywood. Through personnel changes and various challenges over the last 17 years The Lords of Altamont have continued to release albums and play for fans around the world. High points include touring as the support act for their primitive rock n roll idols The Cramps and counting Michael Davis of the MC5 as a past member.

== Reception ==
SoundsXP stated: "There’s not a touch of subtlety or originality but for a rabble-rousing 35 minutes, or as the soundtrack to The Wild One, this can’t be beat." The band has been featured on numerous compilation CDs, notably with the lead track on MOJO's Hendrix tribute with a version of Can You See Me. They have toured extensively, including a performance as part of the 2006 SXSW festival.

== Discography ==
Albums (available on CD & LP)

- To Hell With The Lords (2003) Sympathy for the Record Industry
- Lords Have Mercy (2005) Gearhead/Fargo
- The Altamont Sin (2008) Phantom Sound & Vision
- Midnight To 666 (2011) Fargo Records
- The Lords Take Altamont (2014) Gearhead/Fargo
- The Wild Sounds of The Lords of Altamont (2017) Heavy Psych Sounds Records
- Tune In Turn On Electrify (2021) Heavy Psych Sounds Records
- To Hell With Tomorrow The Lords Are Now (2023) Heavy Psych Sounds Records

Singles and EPs

- "The Split" b/w "She Cried" (2005) (Fargo Records), 7" Single
- "Getting High (On My Mystery Plane)" b/w "(Please) Get Back in the Car" & "Faded Black" (2009), 7" Single/EP
- "Burn Me Out" b/w "Black Eyed Girl" (2011), released on the band's personal "vinyl only" label "Hard Ride Records", 7" Single
- "Going Downtown" b/w "Evil ( Is Goin' On )" (2017), 7" Single/EP label "Hard Ride Records"
