= Till Kahrs =

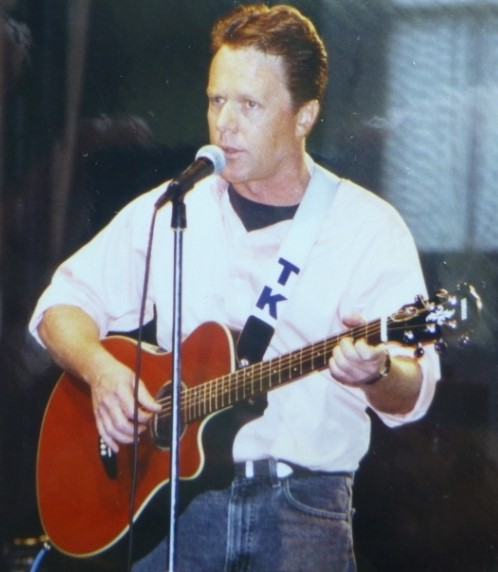
Till Kahrs at Fan Fest LA in 1995

Till Kahrs is a recording artist, singer-songwriter, trainer, speaker, author, and business communication skills expert.

== Early life ==
Kahrs was born in Hamburg, Germany. He is the only son of two German-born parents. When he was one year old, his parents emigrated to the United States, where his father became a professor of political science.

Kahrs graduated from El Dorado High School (Placentia, California) and subsequently attended University of California, Irvine where he received his BA degree in social science. He later received a master's degree in business administration from Pepperdine University. Kahrs has held various positions in sales and marketing for three Fortune 500 Companies in the beverage alcohol industry including Gallo Wine Company, Seagrams, and Heublein before pursuing his musical and speaking/training career. Till became the youngest district manager ever at the Gallo Wine Company at age 22, and the youngest regional manager in history at Seagrams at age 25. He resides in Southern California.

== Musical career ==
Kahrs started playing the Orange County coffee house circuit in the early 1990s playing cover songs as well as his own self-penned compositions. His constant playing and huge following provided him the opportunity to headline The Crazy Horse Saloon, in Santa Ana, California, which he sold out twice in the mid-1990s. The Los Angeles Times called him "the master of hooks" and mentioned further "his greatest asset is his winning baritone", after reviewing one of his shows. This led to his being signed to a six-album record deal by Autogram Records.

In 1994 Kahrs had a Top Ten Country hit in Europe called "Playin’ for Keeps", followed by another Country Top Ten hit titled "Slow Burn Woman" in 1995.

In September 2017 Till's song "The Lights of Hamburg" hit the charts and a 'live' interview was conducted in German on the world's oldest radio station NDR in his hometown of Hamburg.

Kahrs co-wrote the song "By Your Side" with Dirk Schlag and Craig Lackey, released by Nashville-based recording artist Craig Lackey. This trio also wrote the song "Sleepless Nights" for the "Young & The Restless" TV Show Soap Opera on CBS in September of 2024. Kahrs has co-written two songs for German singer Rene Krebs (“German Idol” finalist) and co-written two songs for Greek born German singer Jimmy Makulis (Considered to be the “Sinatra of Germany”). He has also written songs for other European artists like CLEO.

In 2024 Kahrs wrote the title track for the award-winning animated short film “Shanghai Sin”, which he also wrote, produced, and directed. This film was an adaptation based on the novel by Karl Zelinski “Shanghai Sin in Newport Beach”.

Kahrs has also been the lead singer and lyricist for the musical group Blue Moon, signed by Marabu Records. Blue Moon has had several minor hits in Europe and "A Little on the Side" was released in the summer of 2023. In early 2024 the two albums “Till Kahrs 33 Greatest Hits-Triple Tilltanium Box Set” and “Till Kahrs LIVE at The Crazy Horse” were released. In 2026 Till wrote the song "Snowy Night" for the film "A Snowflake Christmas" and he also has 2 songs coming out in a new superhero movie in 2027.

== After music ==
After several years of touring in Europe, Till Kahrs started working as a trainer and advisor on public speaking. In 2000 his book Enhancing Your Presentation Skills was published.

In July 2006 an article appeared in Fitness Magazine and MSN: Get-A-Grip Guide to Conquering Your Phobias and Kahrs explained the secrets of maintaining composure during public speaking. Till has also appeared on national television as a communication expert.

Kahrs has been featured in articles by the Orange County Register, The John Tesh Radio Program, Irvine World News MSN and USA Today.

== Discography ==
- Playin' For Keeps ASIN B001BBW546

== Bibliography ==
- Aktuelle US-Verkaufspraktiken (1987), Freiburg im Breisgau, Haufe ISBN 978-3-448-01724-3 (in German)
- Enhancing Your Presentation Skills (September 2000), iUniverse (self), ISBN 978-0-595-12481-7
