= Dave Klein (musician) =

American drummer

Dave Klein is an American producer, composer and musician with over 25 years' experience as a drummer, bassist and keyboardist. He recorded and toured throughout North America, Europe, Asia and South America with Agent Orange, Sky Saxon and The Seeds, The Ghastly Ones, Woolly Bandits and The Bomboras and has worked with Rob Zombie and producers Scott Humphrey, Barry Adamson and Christopher Wade Damerst. He is the owner and operator of Dave Klein Recording, his private studio located in the hills of Highland Park, California.

== Production, recording, and mixed projects ==
Artists Dave Klein has worked with:

- The Faction
- Decry
- The Bomboras
- Agent Orange
- 45 Grave
- Mac Sabbath
- Guttermouth
- Radioactive Chicken Heads
- Headnoise
- Messer Chups
- Tony Valentino of The Standells
- Sky Saxon
- Powerflex 5
- Didi Wray
- False Confession
- The Clap
- PRV13
- Destruction Made Simple
- Bitch Boys
- Enemy Proof
- Micheal Fordays
- Hear Say
- No Refunds
- Brook Hoover
- Candy Smokes
- Sky Lee Vague
- Baptized In Sin
- Los Mercs
- Cleary Country
- Lewis Bailey
- Charlie Overbey
- Kapali Long
- Devin Barryhill
- Parallel 2 Hell
- Par Avion
- Mortalis
- Creature Preachers
- King Archie
- Cashew & Cleary
- Pandemic Unleashed
- Throw The Goat
- Gamblers Mark
- Soraia
- The Love Me Nots
- The Ghastly Ones
- The Droogs
- In The Whale
- Chuck Treece
- Chris Strompolos
- Ami Canaan Mann
- Daaman Krall
- Rikk Agnew
- Kim Shattuck
- Casey Royer
- Tony Reflux
- The Step Daughters
- Lonely Stars
- Stay Out
- Koi Division
- Celebrity Stalker
- Frozen Charlottes
- Southpaw
- LA's Forgotten
- Spice Pistols
- Justin Paul Sanders
- Vince Conrad (Smart Pills, The Aliens)
- John Rosewall (The Last, Trotsky Icepick)
- Los Grainders (Mexico)
- Blaklist
- SWINE
- The Intros
- Sewerside Bombers
- Johnny Two Chords
- Haze
- Empty Tactics
- Jabbermouth
- The Tiki Creeps
- The Ruffolos
- The LessOffs
- Skarletto and the Apocalypse
- The Tankerays
- The Slithers
- Haymaker (Prague CZ)
- Vegas Death Ray
- The Blanks
- Wick
- Shawn Preston
- The Whining Pussys
- Unpresidented
- John Ciulik
- The Curse
- C:28
- 45 Spider
- The Ultra 4
- Shubees
- Haiz
- Off The Wall
- Scurvy Kids
- The Hellflowers
- The Bots
- The Sound Reasons
- Good Whales
- The Green Machines
- The Nathaniel Johnstone Band
- The Green Ghosts
- The Cherry Drops
- The Aquaholics
- The Atom Age
- The Sirens
- The Unclaimed
- Palmyra Delran and Bubble Gun
- Moonchasers
- The Sloths
- The Vooduo
- The Thingz
- Prost!
- The Seriouslys
- Feral Kizzy
- The Tammy Olea Band
- Unextraordinary Gentlemen
- Galactic Romance
- The Last Wolves
- BloodPenny
- FroBro and Friends
- Insect Surfers
- Kiss Kiss Bang Bang
- The Darklings
- The Odd Squad
- The 20 Grand Club
- The Ghosts of Searchlight
- The Beat Killers
- Ding Dong Devils
- The Rough Boys
- The Returners
- The Spanks
- The Hitz
- Thee Spectors
- The Headless Hearsemen.
- Frozen Charlottes
- The Me Gustas

Dave has also recorded with Rob Zombie and Producers Scott Humphrey, Barry Adamson and Christopher Wade Damerst.

== Touring ==
Dave has variously recorded and toured throughout North America, South America, Europe and Asia with:

- Agent Orange
- Sky Saxon
- The Seeds
- Ghastly Ones
- The Bomboras
- The Witchdoctors
- The Finks
- The Legendary Invisible Men

== Film and game credits ==
Dave's television, film and game credits include:

- Thrasher Magazine King of the Road series (intro theme)
- Speed Traveler (intro theme)
- The Adventures of Crash Tucker (theme)
- Music featured in The Vampire Diaries (DVD)
- FOX Television's "Raising Hope"
- 2009 release of Night of the Demons
- Los Campeones De La Lucha
- Starship Troopers
- SpongeBob SquarePants
- Board Heads
- Music featured in Tony Hawk 2 for iPhone
- I Was A Teenage Monster Shirt Painter
- Additional sound for Bryan Birge's Urban Nomads.

== Discography ==
=== Agent Orange ===
- Halloween Single - This house Is Haunted b/w Whistling Past The Graveyard, 2010

=== Woolly Bandits ===
- Say Hello To My Little Friend, 2004

=== Bomboras ===
- Savage Island, 1995
- Swingin' Singles!, 1996
- Organ Grinder, 1995/1997
- Starship Troopers, 1997
- It Came from Pier 13!, 1997
- Board Headz movie, 1998
- Head Shrinkin' Fun, 1998

=== The Finks ===
- Fill er up and Go

=== Ghastly Ones ===
- A Haunting We Will Go-Go, 1998
- Target: Draculon, 2006
- Unearthed, 2007
- SpongeBob Scaredy Pants, SpongeBob SquarePants: Original Theme Highlights, 2001
- "Flying Saucers Over Van Nuys", green vinyl 45", 2006

=== The Legendary Invisible Men ===
- Who's Sorry Now?, 2000
- Come Get Some, 2002

=== The Seeds ===
- Red Planet, 2004

=== The Witchdoctors ===
- Witchdoctor A Go Go
