= Placentia-Yorba Linda Unified School District =

School district in California, United States

Address
- 1301 E. Orangethorpe Ave. California Placentia, Orange County, California, 92870; United States

District information
- Type: Public
- Grades: TK–12
- Established: 1874
- Superintendent: Dr. Kymberly LeBlanc-Esparza Ed.D.
- School board: Carrie Buck, Marilyn Anderson, Leandra Blades, Todd Frazier, and Tricia Quintero
- Chair of the board: Carrie Buck
- Schools: 34
- NCES District ID: 0630660
- District ID: CA-3066647

Students and staff
- Enrollment: ~22500
- Faculty: ~2000

Other information
- Teachers' unions: Association of Placentia Linda Educators (APLE)
- Website: www.pylusd.org

The Placentia-Yorba Linda Unified School District (PYLUSD) is a public school district that serves Placentia, Yorba Linda, and parts of Anaheim, Brea, and Fullerton located in northeast Orange County, California. The school district covers 45 square miles (120 km^{2}) and employs 3,200 people.

Its student enrollment is approximately 24,000, and the District's 34 school sites include 20 elementary schools, 5 middle schools, 1 K-8 school, 4 comprehensive high schools, 1 special education school, 1 continuation high school, 1 TK-12 home school, and 1 K-12 online school, alongside 5 state preschools.

The district is led by Kymberly LeBlanc Esparza, Ed.D., Superintendent of Schools. The Board of Education includes Carrie Buck, Marilyn Anderson, Leandra Blades, Todd Frazier, and Tricia Quintero.

Twenty-five schools have been designated California Distinguished Schools, eight have been named National Blue Ribbon Schools, seventeen have been honored as California Gold Ribbon Schools, one has earned the title of California Model Continuation High School, and another has received California's Exemplary Independent Study recognition.

The district has also been placed on the College Board’s AP District Honor Roll three times since the program's inception in 2011. The high schools featured are consistently named to "America's Best High Schools" rankings issued by Newsweek, U.S. News & World Report, and other news organizations.

== Academics ==
Academically, the District's students excel on standardized tests, outpacing both state and county averages. Students have won high honors in the county, state, and national competitions, including Academic Decathlon and Science Olympiad tournaments, Mock Trial, and both visual and performing arts competitions. The District averages 30 National Merit and Commended Scholars each year. Graduating classes traditionally earn millions of dollars in academic and athletic scholarships. Graduates attend the most prestigious colleges and universities and often receive appointments to the Air Force Academy, Annapolis and West Point. Notably, Olympic gold medal winners Janet Evans and Michele Granger are among these graduates, as are former state senator John Lewis, world-renowned opera soprano Deborah Voigt, nationally recognized physician Dr. William Schoolcraft, baseball stars Dan Petry, Phil Nevin, and Brett Boone, and NASA astronaut Joe Acaba.

== History ==
The school district dates back to 1874 and has always maintained a rich, historical tradition. A portion of the 1912 Bradford schoolhouse still stands at one of the high school sites, which opened in 1933. The remainder of the district's existing schools were built primarily in the 1960s and 1970s. Thanks to two community bond measures, four new schools opened between 2004 and 2009. The bonds also provided for the renovation of every school in the district and resulted in modernized classrooms equipped with the latest teaching technology tools, new libraries, school offices, science labs, computer pods between classrooms, expanded parking lots, playgrounds, gyms, training and locker rooms.

The Placentia-Yorba Linda Unified School District obtained its name after the 1989 merger between the school districts serving the established community of Placentia and the growing area of Yorba Linda. In 2002 and 2008, the community approved school bond measures to renovate existing schools and build new ones.

== District Leadership & Administration ==
=== Executive Cabinet ===
Kymberly LeBlanc-Esparza, Ed.D., Superintendent
Candace Perez, Ed.D., Deputy Superintendent, Academic Leadership Team (consolidates Student Support Services & Educational Services)
John Pappalardo, Ed.D., Chief Officer, Business Services
Chad McGough, Assistant Superintendent, Human Resources

== Schools and Asst./Principals ==
=== Elementary schools ===
- Brookhaven: Laura Fisher
- Bryant Ranch: Shannon Robles
- Fairmont: Anne San Roman, Principal
  Katie Visconti, Assistant Principal
- George Key: Rebecca Allan
- Glenknoll: Teresa Mulcahy
- Glenview: Jane Roh
- Golden: Kristin McDonald, Principal
  Stephanie Dempsey, Assistant Principal
- Lakeview: Stephanie Given
- Linda Vista: Kristen Petrovacki
- Mabel Paine: Kristi Cooan
- Melrose: Janie Yoo
- Morse: Kelly Farrell
- Rio Vista: Pablo Jimenez
- Rose Drive: Kathleen Escaleras-Nappi
- Ruby Drive: Trisha Gray
- Sierra Vista: Debbie Kojima
- Topaz: Bilma Bermudez Ed.D.
- Travis Ranch: Kristen Petrovacki
- Tynes: Christa Borgese Ed.D.
- Van Buren: David Cammarato
- Wagner: Janice Weber
- Woodsboro: Melanie Carmona

=== Middle schools ===
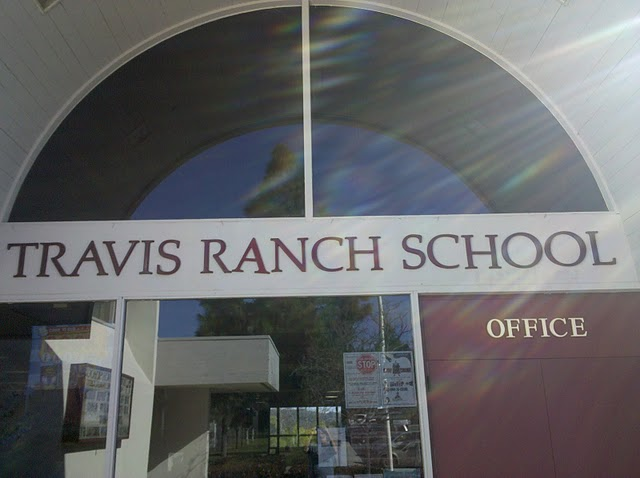
Main entrance of the Travis Ranch campus, a building that houses the school's administrative offices, library, and some elementary classrooms

- Orange County School of Computer Sciences at Bernardo Yorba:
  Jeffrey Williamson, Principal; Vacant, Assistant Principal
- Kraemer:
  Matthew Callaway, Principal;
  Kathryn Ghalambor Poole, Assistant Principal
- Travis Ranch K-8:
  Kristen Petrovacki, Principal; Vacant, E.S. Assistant Principal;
  Brian Plunkett, M.S. Assistant Principal
- Tuffree:
  Takiyah Rogers, Principal;
  Hannah Chapman, Assistant Principal
- Valadez:
  William Truong, Principal;
  Genessis Melendrez, Assistant Principal
- Yorba Linda:
  Richard Nagy, Interim Principal;
  Cheralynn Johnston, Assistant Principal

=== High schools ===
- El Dorado:
  Michael Zides, Principal;
  James Goodwin, Assistant Principal;
  Sage Newman, Assistant Principal
- Esperanza:
  Kelly Molina, Principal;
  Joshua Lay, Assistant Principal;
  Kimberly Barraza Lyons, Ph.D., Assistant Principal
  Chad Greendale, Assistant Principal
- Valencia:
  Paige Stills, Interim Principal
  Jinasha Udeshi, Assistant Principal
  Paola Suchsland, Ed.D., Assistant Principal
  Vacant, Assistant Principal
- Yorba Linda:
  Bird Potter, Principal
  Michael Ciecek, Assistant Principal
  Stephanie Nguyen, Assistant Principal

=== Alternative education schools ===
- El Camino Real (9–12 continuation): Gina Aguilar, Principal
- Parkview (K–12 home school/independent study): Dominique Polchow, Principal
- Buena Vista Virtual Academy (K-12): Dominique Polchow, Principal
