= Joe Hawley =

American football player (born 1988)

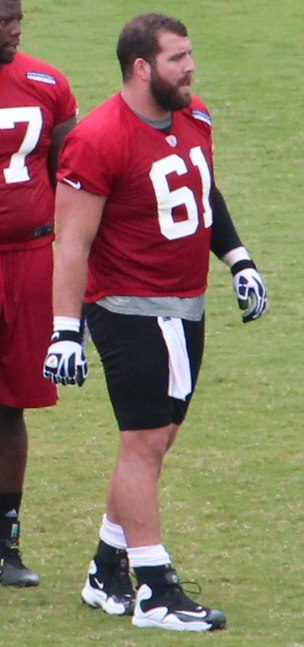
- Hawley with the Atlanta Falcons in 2013

No. 61, 68
- Position: Center

Personal information
- Born: October 22, 1988 (age 38); Bakersfield, California, U.S.
- Listed height: 6 ft 3 in (1.91 m)
- Listed weight: 302 lb (137 kg)

Career information
- High school: Esperanza (Anaheim, California)
- College: UNLV
- NFL draft: 2010: 4th round, 117th overall pick

Career history
- Atlanta Falcons (2010–2014); Tampa Bay Buccaneers (2015–2017)

Career NFL statistics
- Games played: 91
- Games started: 54
- Stats at Pro Football Reference

Joseph Kelly Hawley (born October 22, 1988) is an American former professional football player who was a center for the Atlanta Falcons and Tampa Bay Buccaneers of the National Football League (NFL). He played college football for the UNLV Rebels and was selected by the Falcons with the 117th pick in the fourth round of the 2010 NFL draft.

== Early life ==
Hawley attended Esperanza High School in Anaheim, California. He began playing football as a freshman, and in his senior year, was named MVP and Male Athlete of the Year. He was a three-year letter winner and received Prep Star All West Region Honors. He was regarded as a three-star recruit.

Hawley recorded a school record 48 decleats as the Aztecs racked up an astounding 5,535 yards rushing, 7th most in California history, en route to the Division 1 CIF Championship game in 2005. He played in the Cali-Florida Bowl and the Orange County and LA Shriners All-Star games in 2006. Joe was Sunset League Offensive Lineman of the Year in 2004 and 2005; All-State Underclass, CalHiSports in 2004; All-State, First-team, CalHiSports in 2005; LA Times All-Star, First-team, in 2004 and 2005; All-Orange County, First-team, OC Register in 2004 and 2005; All-CIF Southern Section, All Divisions, First-team in 2005; and, All-CIF Southern Section, Division 1, First-team in 2004 and 2005.

== Professional career ==
=== Atlanta Falcons ===
Hawley was selected in the fourth round of the 2010 NFL draft by the Atlanta Falcons. On September 7, 2015, he was released by the Falcons.

=== Tampa Bay Buccaneers ===
On September 14, 2015, Hawley was signed by the Tampa Bay Buccaneers.

On March 15, 2017, Hawley signed a two-year contract with the Buccaneers. During 2017, the team moved Ali Marpet to center from his original guard position, replacing Hawley.

On February 26, 2018, the Buccaneers declined the second-year option on Hawley's contract, making him a free agent in 2018.

=== Retirement ===
Hawley spent eight years in the NFL and retired after becoming a free agent in 2018 to pursue a passion project. He donated most of his belongings to Metropolitan Ministries of Tampa Bay and planned to live out of a custom 2007 Ford E-350 diesel cargo van as he explores the country with his rescue dog named Freedom. He departed the Tampa Bay area on April 5, 2018 to document his journey on YouTube, Instagram, and Twitter using the handle "ManVanDogBlog".
