= Ty Benefield =

American football player (born 2005)

No. 2 – LSU Tigers
- Position: Safety
- Class: Senior

Personal information
- Born: September 4, 2005 (age 21); Vancouver, British Columbia, Canada
- Listed height: 6 ft 3 in (1.91 m)
- Listed weight: 208 lb (94 kg)

Career information
- High school: Crean Lutheran (Irvine, California, U.S.)
- College: Boise State (2023–2025); LSU (2026–present)

Awards and highlights
- First-team All-Mountain West (2025)
- Stats at ESPN

Ty Benefield (born September 4, 2005) is a Canadian college football safety for the LSU Tigers. He previously played for the Boise State Broncos.

== Early life ==
Benefield attended Crean Lutheran High School in Irvine, California. During his senior season, he racked up 90 receptions for 1,404 yards and 20 touchdowns. Coming out of high school, Benefield was rated as a three-star recruit by 247Sports and committed to play college football for the Boise State Broncos over offers from other schools such as Washington, Washington State, Oregon State, BYU, Colorado State, and Stetson.

== College career ==
=== Boise State ===
As a freshman in 2023, Benefield recorded 46 tackles. In 2024, he started all 14 games, notching 82 tackles, two interceptions, and two fumble recoveries. In 2025, Benefield started all 14 games, recording 105 tackles, three pass deflections, two interceptions, a forced fumble, and a fumble recovery, earning first-team all-Mountain West honors. After the season, he entered his name into the NCAA transfer portal.

== Personal life ==
Benefield is the son of former CFL linebacker Daved Benefield.
