= Crean Lutheran High School =

Lutheran high school in Irvine, California

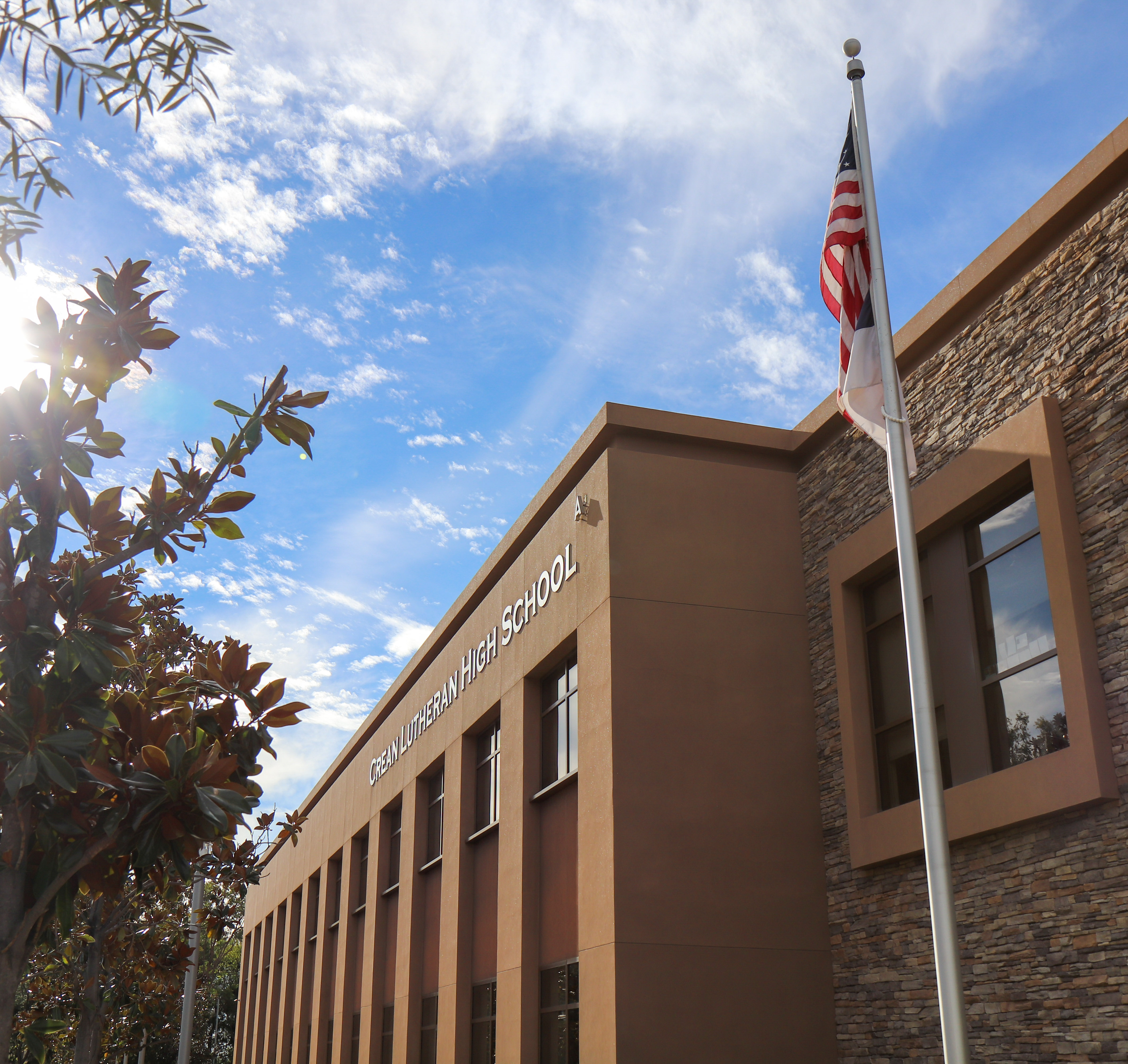

Location
- 12500 Sand Canyon Avenue; Irvine, California 92618; United States; 33°42′08″N 117°43′55″W

Information
- Former names: Lutheran South High; Crean Lutheran South High School
- Type: Private
- Motto: Proclaiming Jesus Christ through Excellence in Education
- Religious affiliation: Lutheran Church–Missouri Synod
- Established: 2007
- Grades: 9 to 12
- Enrollment: 1125
- Campus size: 30 acres (12 ha)
- Campus type: Suburban
- Colors: Navy; Gold
- Athletics conference: Century Conference
- Mascot: Saints
- Accreditations: WASC, NLSA
- Publication: The Mirror
- Yearbook: Canon
- Website: www.creanlutheran.org

Crean Lutheran High School is a private Lutheran high school in Irvine, California. The school was founded in 2007 as Lutheran South High School and had its initial campus at St. Paul's Greek Orthodox Church in the Woodbridge neighborhood of Irvine. In 2010, Crean Lutheran opened its own campus in southeastern Irvine near the Woodbury neighborhood. The school was renamed after John and Donna Crean, local philanthropists who donated US$10,000,000 to the school in its first year.

Crean Lutheran is accredited by the Western Association of Schools and Colleges as well as the National Lutheran Schools Accreditation. The school was accredited as a National Blue Ribbon School in 2023.

== Athletics ==
Crean Lutheran sponsors 26 varsity teams across 15 different sports. The teams compete in the CIF Southern Section in the Century Conference. The school was a member of the Academy League from 2009 until 2017 and the Empire League from 2017 to 2024. Crean's girls swimming and diving team won a state title in 2016. The boys basketball team won a CIF Division 3AA state championship in 2018 and a Division 2A state championship in 2021.

== Notable alumni ==
- Ty Benefield, college football safety for the Boise State Broncos
