= This Is the Voice =

Studio album by Agent Orange
- Released: June 27, 1986
- Genre: Punk rock, post punk
- Length: 34:23
- Label: Enigma Records

Agent Orange chronology
Living in Darkness (1981)	This Is the Voice (1986)	Virtually Indestructible (1996)

Professional ratings
Review scores
Source	Rating
AllMusic	4.5/5 stars
Los Angeles Times	unfavourable
Trouser Press	favourable

This Is the Voice is the second studio album by American punk rock band Agent Orange, released in 1986 by Enigma Records.

A retrospective AllMusic review said, "The long-delayed second Agent Orange album isn't quite Living in Darkness part two, though it's little different from that album in many ways -- same nuclear-strength attack that's equal parts surf and punk intensity, catchy and threatening all at once".

== Track listing ==
No.	Title	Writer(s)	Length
1.	"Voices (In the Night)"	Agent Orange	2:23
2.	"It's in Your Head"	Agent Orange	2:59
3.	"Say It Isn't True"	Agent Orange	2:49
4.	"Fire in the Rain"	Agent Orange	3:19
5.	"In Your Dreams Tonight"	Agent Orange	5:02
6.	"Tearing Me Apart"	Agent Orange	3:09
7.	"...So Strange"	Agent Orange	2:19
8.	"Bite the Hand That Feeds (Part 1)"	Agent Orange	5:30
9.	"I Kill Spies"	Agent Orange	2:45
10.	"This Is Not the End"	Agent Orange	4:08
Total length:			34:23
