= Evan Shanks =

Musical artist (born 1964)

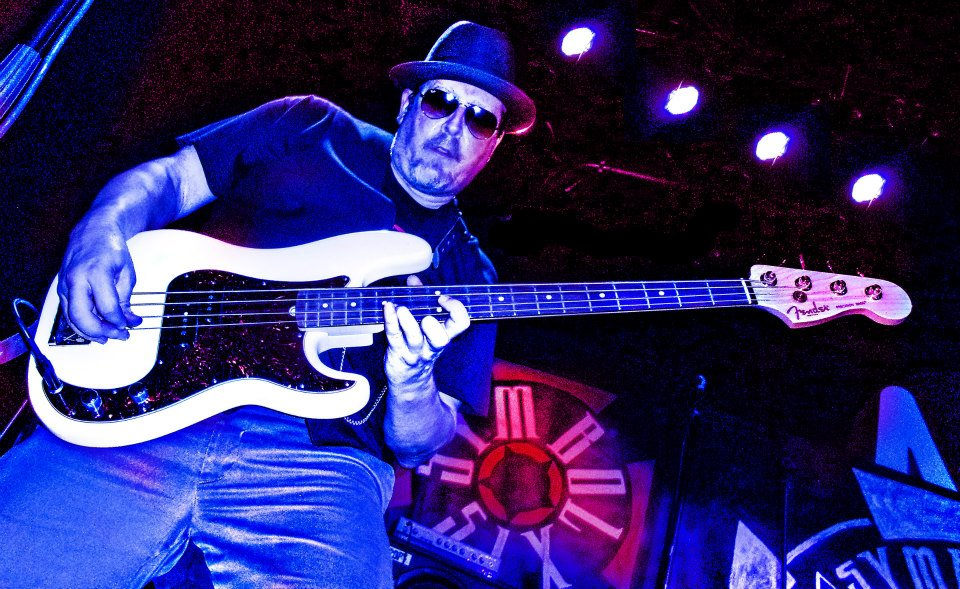
- Evan Shanks, Symbol Six

Background information
- Born: Evan Shanks; October 10, 1964 (age 61); Los Angeles
- Origin: Los Angeles
- Genres: Punk rock, Rock & roll
- Occupations: Songwriter, bassist
- Instrument: Bass
- Years active: 1983–present
- Labels: Jailhouse Records, Symbol Six Music, Bad Idea Music
- Website: https://www.symbolsix.com

Evan Shanks (born October 10, 1964) is an American rock bassist for Symbol Six and Entropy.

== Career ==
In the early 1980s, Entropy played such venues as Grand Olympic Auditorium and Cathay de Grande right in the heart of Los Angeles / Orange County Punk rock. They went on to play a steady stream of shows for Goldenvoice: 45 Grave, The Circle Jerks, NOFX, The Melvins, The Minutemen, The Butthole Surfers, 7 Seconds, DI, The Toy Dolls, The Effigies, Wasted Youth, English Dogs, D.R.I., Detox, The Dickies, Conflict, and The Dead Kennedys.

In 2009, Ace & Eights performed with Slash and Steven Adler of Guns N' Roses.

Shanks is currently the bassist for the Los Angeles rock band Symbol Six.

== Musicians collaborated with ==
- Eric Leach, Tony Fate, Phil George, Taz Rudd: Symbol Six
- Phil George, Patrick Stone, Taz Rudd: Aces N' Eights
- Entropy

== Discography ==
- 1985 Gross National Product EP - ENTROPY Catalog #BI-001 (Bad Idea Music)
- 1986 Kaaos Zine Presents - ENTROPY Catalog #BCT 21 (Bad Compilation Tapes)
- 2005 Farewell To Venice - ENTROPY (BDF Records)
- 2006 Post-Industrial Hardcore - ENTROPY
- 2010 Monsters 11 - SYMBOL SIX (Symbol Six Music)
- 2014 Dirtyland - SYMBOL SIX Catalog #JHR 049 (Jailhouse Records)
- 2014 SYMBOL SIX/Fang Split Catalog #JHR 047 (Jailhouse Records)
- 2015 SYMBOL SIX/Rikk Agnew Split Catalog #JHR 055 (Jailhouse Records)

== Gallery ==
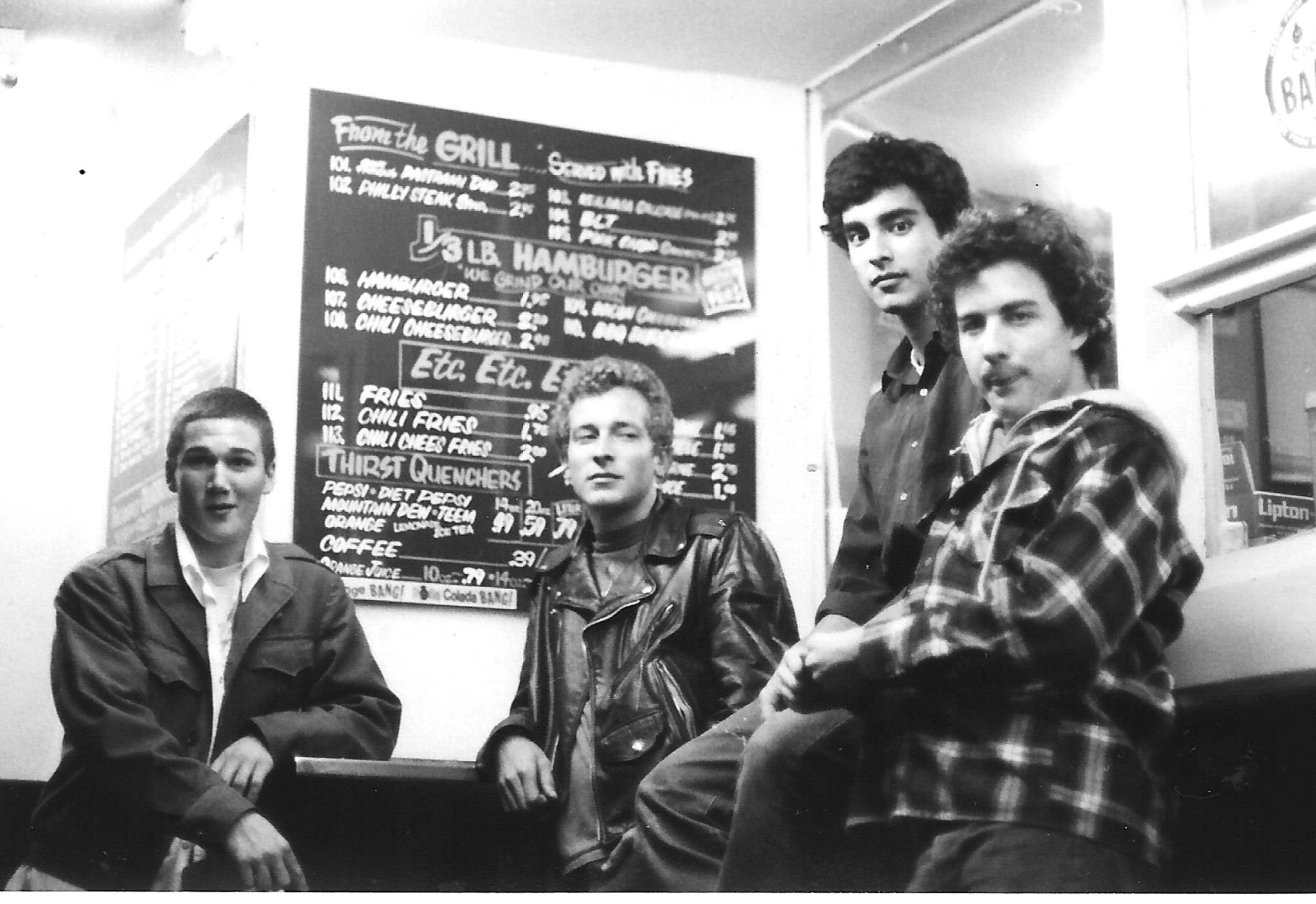
Evan Shanks, Entropy

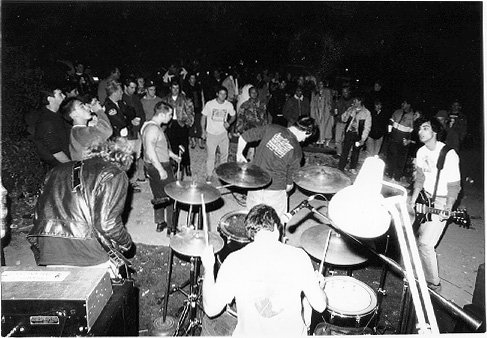
Evan Shanks, Entropy

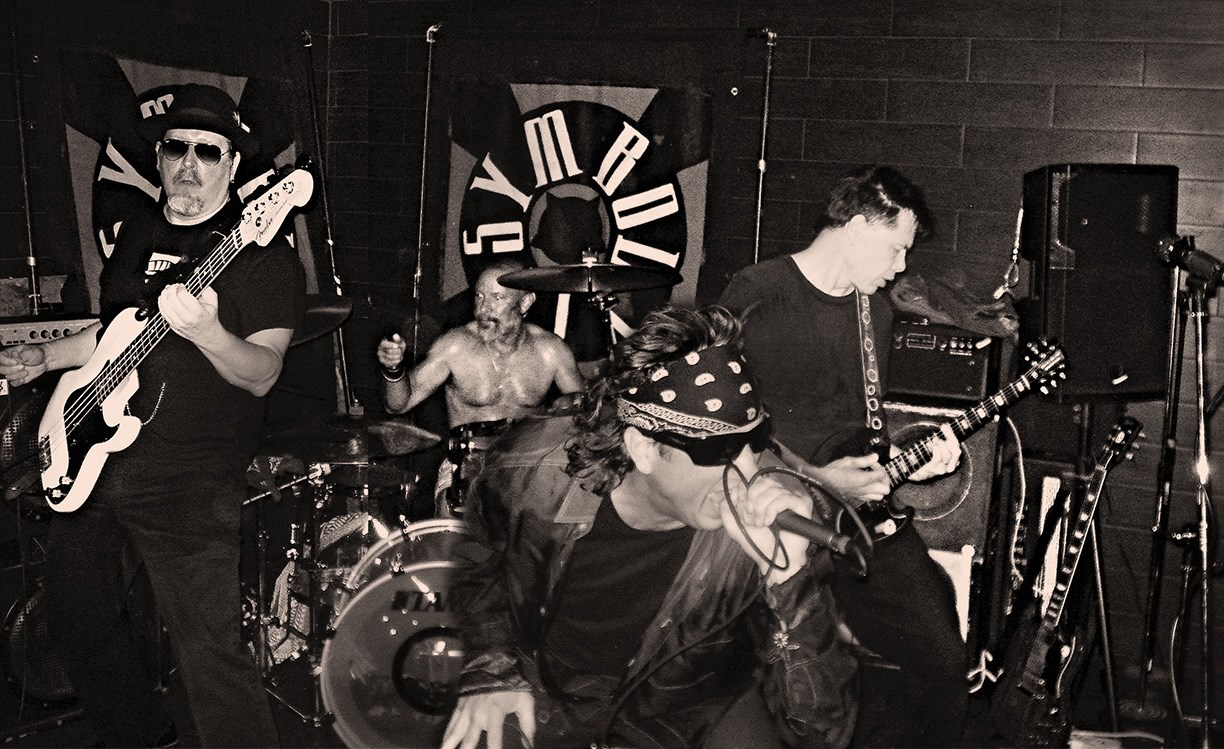
Evan Shanks, Symbol Six
