= Agent Orange (band) =

American punk rock band

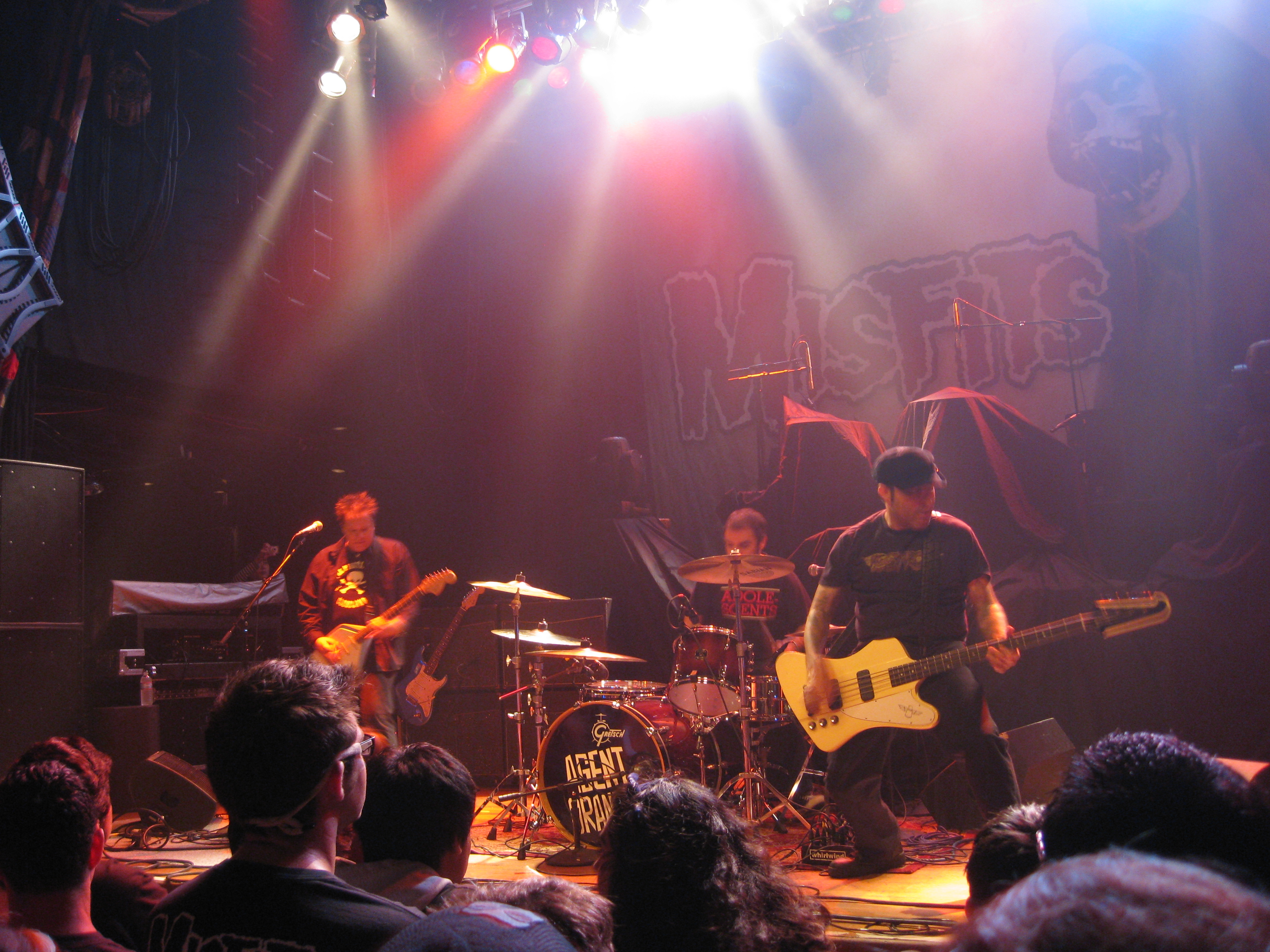
- Agent Orange performing at the San Diego House of Blues in 2011

Background information
- Origin: Placentia, California
- Genres: Punk rock, surf punk, skate punk
- Years active: 1979–present
- Labels: Posh Boy; Enigma; Restless; Invisible; Gunka Disc; Anarchy
- Members: Mike Palm; Perry Giordano; Sandy Hanson
- Past members: Scott Miller; Steve Soto; James Levesque; Brent Liles; Derek O'Brien; Tim Riley; Scotty Lund; Sam Bolle; Charlie Quintana; Steve Latanation; Dusty Watson; Dave Klein
- Website: agentorange.net

Agent Orange is an American punk rock band formed in Placentia, California in 1979. The band was one of the first to mix punk rock with surf music.

A power trio, the band was founded by frontman and guitarist Mike Palm who has remained the band's sole constant member. The lineup of Palm, James Levesque (bass) and Scott Miller (drums) recorded Agent Orange's first two albums, Living in Darkness (1981) and This Is the Voice (1986), interspersed with a number of singles and EP’s. Their third album, Virtually Indestructible (1996) was released with Sam Bolle on bass and Charlie Quintana on drums. The band has not released any new material since. As of 2019, the band consists of Palm, Perry Giordano (bass) and Sandy Hanson (drums).

== History ==
=== 1980s ===
The power trio's original lineup was Mike Palm on guitar and vocals, Steve Soto on bass and Scott Miller on drums.

They first gained attention for their song "Bloodstains", originally appearing on their self-released debut 7-inch EP in 1980. A demo version of the song was given to Rodney Bingenheimer, a DJ at Pasadena radio station KROQ-FM, who placed it on his seminal 1980 compilation album, Rodney on the ROQ, on Posh Boy Records.

With James Levesque on bass (replacing Soto, who left to form the Adolescents), the group recorded their debut Living In Darkness album with Brian Elliot, best known for composing Madonna's hit "Papa Don't Preach". The record was released by Posh Boy in November 1981 and included another, newer version of "Bloodstains" (later used in Tony Hawk's Pro Skater 4). A 12-inch EP, Bitchin' Summer, followed in 1982 on Posh Boy that featured a recording of the Chantays tune "Pipeline" and other surf rock instrumentals.

Signing to Enigma Records, the band covered The Jefferson Airplane’s "Somebody to Love" for 1983's When You Least Expect It... 12-inch EP and eventually a second full length album, This Is the Voice, released in 1986.

In 1988, former Social Distortion bassist Brent Liles replaced Levesque, and the following year, Derek O'Brien (also a former member of Social Distortion as well as D.I.) replaced Miller on drums.

=== Subsequent activity ===
In 1990, the band was featured as the nightclub performers in the Direct-to-Video film, Pale Blood. Songs included were Fire and the Rain, Bite the Hand That Feeds, and So Strange. In 1991, Restless Records released the Real Live Sound live album, recorded at The Roxy in Hollywood on July 21, 1990. It was the only Agent Orange recording to feature the Palm/Liles/O'Brien line-up. Sam Bolle replaced Liles in January 1992, remaining with the band until May 2003, when he left to join Dick Dale's band.

A third studio album, Virtually Indestructible, was released in 1996 on the Gunka Disc label. The album featured drummer Charlie Quintana, formerly of the Plugz and later of Social Distortion.

Greatest & Latest – This, That-N-The Other Thing a compilation of rerecorded older material and new songs, was released in 2000 on Cleopatra Records, and featured Bolle on bass and Steve Latanation on drums. Latanation as well as Dusty Watson alternately played drums through 2008. In 2006, Perry Giordano joined on bass. In 2009, the band added drummer Dave Klein, who had previously recorded with numerous bands including the Bomboras, Ghastly Ones and the Seeds/Sky Saxon. In 2019, Sandy Hanson joined on Drums.

Former bassist Liles died on January 18, 2007 and former bassist Levesque died on October 19, 2014. Founding member and former bassist Steve Soto died on June 27, 2018.

== Band members ==
Current

- Mike Palm – guitars, lead vocals (1979–present)
- Perry Giordano – bass, backing vocals (2006–present)
- Sandy Hanson - drums (2019–present)

Former

- Scott Miller – drums (1979–1989)
- Steve Soto – bass (1979; died 2018)
- James Levesque – bass (1979–1988; died 2014)
- Brent Liles – bass (1988–1991; died 2007)
- Derek O'Brien – drums (1989–1991)
- Scotty Lund – drums (1991–1995)
- Sam Bolle – bass (1992–2003)
- Charlie Quintana – drums (1996; died 2018)
- Steve Latanation – drums (1997–2003)
- Dusty Watson – drums (2004–2008)
- Dave Klein – drums, backing vocals (2009–2018)
- Bruce Taylor – bass (2004–2005)

== Discography ==
=== Studio albums ===
- Living in Darkness (1981, Posh Boy Records)
- This Is the Voice (1986, Enigma Records)
- Virtually Indestructible (1996, Gunka Disc)

=== EPs ===
- Bloodstains 7-inch EP (1980, self-released)
- Bitchin' Summer 12-inch EP (1982, Posh Boy Records)
- When You Least Expect It... 12-inch EP (1983, Enigma Records)

=== Singles ===
- "Everything Turns Grey" 7-inch (1981, Posh Boy Records)
- "Secret Agent Man" 7-inch (1986, Invisible Records)
- "Eldorado" Found: The Lost 12th Song 7-inch (1990, Posh Boy Records)
- "The Electric Storm" 7-inch (1992, self-released)
- "Bloodstains" 7-inch (1997, Anarchy Music)
- "This House Is Haunted - Whistling Past The Graveyard" (2010, self-released)

=== Live albums ===
- Real Live Sound (1991, Restless Records)

=== Compilation albums ===
- Greatest & Latest – This, That-N-The Other Thing (2000, Cleopatra Records)
- Sonic Snake Session (2003, Restless Records)
- Blood Stained Hitz (2004, Anarchy Music)
- Surfing to Some F#*ked Up S@!t (2008, Anarchy Music)

=== Selected compilation appearances ===
- "Bloodstains" on Rodney on the ROQ (1980, Posh Boy Records)
- "Mr. Moto" on Rodney on the ROQ – Volume 2 (1981, Posh Boy Records)
- "Everything Turns Grey" on Posh Hits Vol. 1 (1982, Posh Boy Records)
- "Out of Limits" and "Surf Beat" on What Surf (1983, What Records?)
- "Bloodstains" on Blood on the ROQ! (1983, Quiet)
- "Shakin' All Over" on Flipside Vinyl Fanzine Vol 2 (1984, Flipside Records/Gasatanka)
- "Surfbeat '85" on What Surf II (1985, Iloki Records)
- "Fire in the Rain" on River's Edge (1987, Enigma Records)
- "It's in Your Head" on Under Cover Original Motion Picture Soundtrack (1987, Enigma Records)
- "Pipeline" on The Allnighter – Original Soundtrack (1987, Chameleon Records)
- "Out of Limits" on What Surf III (1988, Iloki Records)
- "Bloodstains" and "Misirlou" on The Best of Rodney on the ROQ (1989, Posh Boy Records)
- "Everything Turns Grey" and "Pipeline" on Posh Boy • The Singles Vol. One (1990, Posh Boy Records)
- "Tiki Ti" on Attack of the New Killer Surf Guitars (1997, Shanachie Records)
- "On a Plain" on Smells Like Bleach – A Punk Tribute to Nirvana (2000, Cleopatra Records)
- "Seek & Destroy" on A Punk Tribute to Metallica (2001, Cleopatra Records)
- "Everything Turns Grey" on Freddy Got Fingered (2001, Restless Records)
- "Bloodstains" on Punk and Disorderly (2001, Cleopatra Records)
