= Living in Darkness =

Studio album by Agent Orange
- Released: November 1981
- Recorded: 1979 – September 1981
- Studio: Brian Elliot Recording (Hollywood)
- Genre: Punk rock; surf punk; hardcore punk; skate punk
- Length: 19:53
- Label: Posh Boy
- Producer: Daniel VanPatten

Agent Orange chronology
| Living in Darkness (1981) | This Is the Voice (1986) |

Professional ratings
Review scores
| Source | Rating |
|---|---|
| AllMusic | 4.5/5 stars |

Living in Darkness is the debut studio album by American punk rock band Agent Orange, released in 1981 on Posh Boy Records. The album showcased the band's innovative mixture of punk, surf rock and skate punk, and was also listed on Phoenix New Times' list of the "10 Best Skate Punk Records of All Time".

The original album consisted of eight tracks. In 1992, it was expanded to include three unreleased tracks from the album sessions ("Pipeline", "Breakdown" and "Mr. Moto") as well as the 1979 recordings that won them their Posh Boy contract ("Bloodstains", "America", "Bored of You" and "El Dorado"). A 1981 interview and liner notes written by guitarist Mike Palm were also included in the reissue. In 1988, Agent Orange recorded an as-yet unreleased version of the album, titled Living in Total Darkness.

Three songs are covers of classic surf instrumentals: "Pipeline" by the Chantays, "Miserlou" by Dick Dale and "Mr. Moto" by the Bel-Airs.

== In popular culture ==
"Everything Turns Grey" was featured in the 2001 film Freddy Got Fingered, as well as the 2001 video game Mat Hoffman's Pro BMX and the 2025 video game Tony Hawk's Pro Skater 3 + 4. It was also covered by punk rock band Lagwagon for their fifth album Let's Talk About Feelings, and the song also appeared in the third episode of the season two of the TV show 13 Reasons Why. "Bored of You" was featured in the 2013 open world video game Grand Theft Auto V, on the Channel X punk rock radio station. "Bloodstains" was featured in the skateboarding games Tony Hawk’s Pro Skater 4 and Skate 3. "No Such Thing" was featured in the skateboarding game Skate.

== Track listing ==
All songs written by Mike Palm, except for where noted.

=== LP original release: Posh Boy Records PBS 122 (US) - released in 1981 ===
Side one
| No. | Title | Length |
|---|---|---|
| 1. | "Too Young to Die" | 2:04 |
| 2. | "Everything Turns Grey" (Palm, Levesque) | 2:00 |
| 3. | "Miserlou" (traditional, arranged by Palm) | 2:07 |
| 4. | "The Last Goodbye" | 2:49 |

Side two
| No. | Title | Length |
|---|---|---|
| 5. | "No Such Thing" | 2:47 |
| 6. | "A Cry for Help in a World Gone Mad" | 2:09 |
| 7. | "Bloodstains" | 1:44 |
| 8. | "Living in Darkness" (Palm, Levesque) | 4:13 |
| Total length: | | 19:53 |

=== CD reissue: Posh Boy Records R2 71092 (US) - released in 1992 ===
| No. | Title | Length |
|---|---|---|
| 1. | "Bloodstains (Original Version)" | 1:53 |
| 2. | "Too Young to Die" | 2:04 |
| 3. | "Everything Turns Grey" (Palm, Levesque) | 2:00 |
| 4. | "Miserlou" (traditional, arranged by Palm) | 2:07 |
| 5. | "The Last Goodbye" | 2:49 |
| 6. | "No Such Thing" | 2:47 |
| 7. | "Cry for Help in a World Gone Mad" | 2:09 |
| 8. | "Bloodstains (Darkness Version)" | 1:44 |
| 9. | "Living in Darkness" (Palm, Levesque) | 4:13 |
| 10. | "Pipeline" (Brian Carmen, Bob Spickard) | 3:54 |
| 11. | "Breakdown" (Palm, Soto) | 2:54 |
| 12. | "Mr. Moto" (Richard Delvy, Paul Johnson) | 1:59 |
| 13. | "America" | 1:20 |
| 14. | "Bored of You" | 1:48 |
| 15. | "El Dorado" | 1:44 |
| 16. | "Interview 1981" (Interview conducted by Chris Marlowe) | 9:21 |
| Total length: | | 44:46 |

- Track 1 originally from the Rodney on the Roq compilation album from Posh Boy Records, PBS 106 (US), released in 1980.
- Tracks 10, 11, 12 originally from the Bitchin' Summer 12-inch EP from Posh Boy Records, PBS 1037 (US), released in 1982.
- Tracks 13, 14 originally from the Agent Orange 7-inch EP, self-released in 1980.
- Tracks 15, 16 originally from the Eldorado 7-inch single from Posh Boy Records, PBS 30 (US), released in 1990.

== Personnel ==
- Mike Palm: guitar, lead vocals
- James Levesque: bass
- Scott Miller: drums
- Steve Soto: bass (on 1979 tracks)
