= Valencia High School (Placentia, California) =

Public secondary school in Placentia, California, United States

- 500 North Bradford Avenue; Placentia, CA 92870

Information
- Type: Public
- Established: 1933
- School district: Placentia-Yorba Linda Unified School District
- Principal: Paige Stills
- Staff: 129
- Grades: 9-12
- Enrollment: 2,424 (2023-2024)
- Color: Blue Gold
- Athletics conference: Empire League
- Mascot: Tiger
- Newspaper: El Tigre
- Yearbook: Tesoros
- Website: vhstigers.org

Valencia High School is a high school in Placentia, California under the Placentia-Yorba Linda Unified School District.

Many of Valencia's buildings, including the auditorium and cafeteria, were built during the Great Depression by the WPA.

As of 2024, the school serves a student body of approximately 2,500 students living in southern Placentia and northeast Anaheim. Beginning in the summer of 2010, Valencia underwent a series of renovations and construction projects, including a new 17-classroom building, modernized school breezeway and administration building, and new bleachers at Bradford Stadium. A modernized "quad" was also among the list of projects, serving as a center of campus life and a common location of school activities. Funding for these improvements was provided by Measure A, which was approved by local voters in 2008.

Valencia is the International Baccalaureate (IB) magnet school in PYLUSD. The school's website claims it is one of the best IB programs in Orange County, CA. The school also hosts an advanced technology program called Val Tech, in which students must complete an internship during the summer between their junior and senior years.

The school's mascot is the Tiger, and its team colors are blue and gold.

Kraemer Middle School is near the campus, with a long, narrow parking lot separating the two.

== Athletics ==
The girl's water polo team won the CIF-SS water polo championship in 2023. Scoring 51 goals in their CIF run, allowing only 15 goals scored against.

The boy's tennis team won the 2012 and 2015 CIF Championships.

The girl's tennis team won CIF three years in a row (2006, 2007, 2008). The girl's tennis team also won CIF in 2015.

Boys' cross country has dominated the Empire League since 1999, achieving a perfect score of 15 in 2015 for Empire League Finals, and qualifying for Division 1 State Championships during the 2016 season.

The boys varsity water polo won Empire League in 2015 as well. The boys varsity swim team also won Empire League titles in 2003, 2006, 2007, 2008, 2014, and lately in 2021.

== Notable alumni ==
- Héctor Ambriz, pitcher for the Cleveland Indians.
- Ricky Castillo, professional golfer.
- Michael Chang, U.S. tennis player.
- Beneil Dariush, professional MMA fighter currently fighting for UFC.
- Chris Draft, NFL pro football player, Falcons/Giants/Panthers.
- Suzanne Enoch, (Class of 1982) romance novel author.
- Joe Garten, (Class of 1987), NFL and CFL pro football player.
- Michele Granger, (Class of 1988), U.S. Olympic gold medal-winning softball player.
- Daryl Mallett (Class of 1986), author and actor.
- Kathy Olivier, women's basketball head coach, UNLV.
- Linda Sánchez (Class of 1987), U.S. Congresswoman representing 39th District of California.
- Julie Swail, U.S. Olympic women's water polo team captain at 2000 Sydney Olympics and triathlete at 2008 Beijing Olympics.
- Chris Tidland, professional golfer
