= Jake Cavaliere =

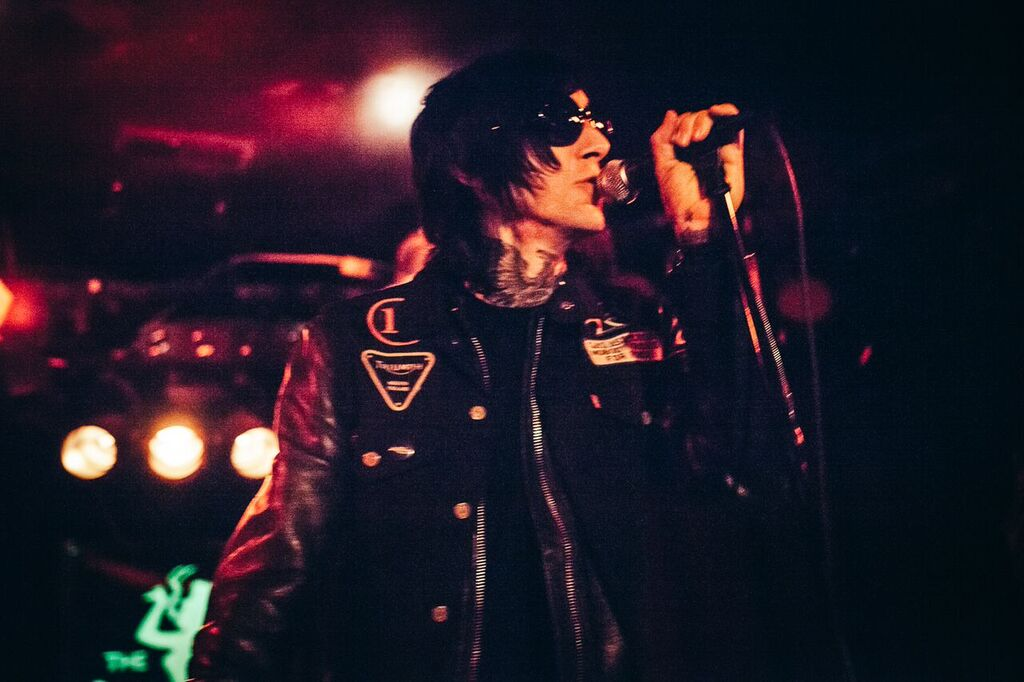
- Cavaliere in 2015

Background information
- Born: Jacob Cavaliere; April 5th Downey, California, United States
- Genres: Punk Rock, Rock & Roll, Garage Punk, Surf, Psychedelic
- Occupations: Musician, Singer, Song Writer, Tattoo Artist
- Instruments: Vocals, Organ, Piano, Bass, Harmonica
- Years active: 1989–present
- Labels: Dionysus, Sympathy For the Record Industry, Fargo, Gearhead Records, Zombie A Go Go, Capitol
- Website: https://lordsofaltamont.com/

Jake Cavaliere (born Jacob Cavaliere, April 5, 1972, in Downey, California) is an American musician, singer, songwriter, and tattoo artist. He is best known for being the frontman and lead vocalist for Southern California rock and roll band Lords of Altamont, as well as his contributions as organ player and vocalist for the surf and garage combo The Bomboras.

Often known as 'The Preacher', Jake started his career in music while still attending high school with San Diego-based garage band Eastern Green and has also spent time on tour with The Cramps as a guitar technician in the mid-2000s. He has since appeared in, or recorded with acts such as : The Witchoctors, The Fuzztones, The Finks, The Bomboras, Chelsea Smiles, The Sonics, The Morlocks, The Go-Nuts, Untamed Youth, Lord Hunt & His Missing Finks, The Lords of Altamont

== Discography ==
Band Name	Name of Recording	Record label	Release date
The Fuzztones	Braindrops	Music Maniac Records	1991
Link Protrudi And The Jaymen	Slow Grind	Music Maniac Records	1992
The Witchdoctors	The Witchdoctors	Dionysus	1992
The Finks	Fill Er Up And Go!	Dionysus	1994
The Witchdoctors	Goin To A Graveyard	Screaming Apple	1994
The Witchdoctors	Witchdoctors A Go Go	Dionysus	1994
The Fuzztones	Face of Time/ My Brother The Man	R.A.F.R	1994
Lord Hunt & His Missing Finks	Rodan	Screaming Apple	1994
Little Drummer Boy	Happy Birthday Baby Jesus; The Second Coming	Sympathy For The Record Industry	1994
The Bomboras	Savage Island	Dionysus	1995
The Bomboras	Forbidden Planet	Dionysus	1995
The Bomboras	Organ Grinder	Screaming Apple	1996
The Outlaw	HotRods To Hell	Blood Red vinyl & Discs	1996
Fiberglass Jungle	Jabberjaw...Pure Sweet Hell	Mammoth Records	1996
The Bomboras	It Came From Pier 13	Dionysus	1997
The Bomboras	Head Shrinkin Fun	Zombie A Go Go Records	1998
Dead Friends	The Vermin 2 - The Vermin vs. You	Wood Shampoo	1998
Lords of Altamont	To Hell With The Lords of Altamont	Fargo	2002
Lords of Altamont	Lords Have Mercy	Gearhead Records	2005
Lords of Altamont	The Altamont Sin	Gearhead Records	2008
Lords of Altamont	Midnight to 666	Fargo	2011
Lords of Altamont	Burn Me Out / Black Eyed Girl	Hard Ride Records	2011
Lords of Altamont	Lords Take Altamont	Gearhead Records	2014
Lords of Altamont	Wild Sounds of the Lords of Altamont	Heavy Psych Sounds	2017
Lords of Altamont	Tune In, Turn On, Electrify	Heavy Psych Sounds	2021
