= James Levesque =

American singer-songwriter

James Levesque (1962 – October 19, 2014) was an American musician. He was best known as the bass player from the hardcore punk/surf punk band Agent Orange. Levesque was the bass player for the touring punk band from 1979-1988, along with original members Mike Palm and Scott Miller. Levesque's songwriting and artistic influences on the band's most notable releases (Living in Darkness, This is the Voice) helped create the explosive music scene in Orange County, California in the early 1980s. The melodic guitar driven surf punk with vocal harmonies influenced bands such as Nirvana, Bad Religion, The Offspring and Green Day.

Agent Orange is considered to be the originator of "skate rock" after their music was used in the Vision Skateboard video "Skate Visions" that crowned them Kings of the skater bands. The video spawned many imitators and is the best-selling skateboard music video of all time.

Levesque was a BMI affiliated songwriter and co-writer of such punk classics as "Everything Turns Grey", "Living in Darkness", "Voices in the Night", and "In Your Dreams Tonight".

Levesque was a music and entertainment publicist in Beverly Hills, California and represented Larry Birkhead and attorney Debra Opri in the Anna Nicole Smith paternity battle.

Levesque died on October 19, 2014.
