= Ghastly Ones =

American surf–garage band

The Ghastly Ones
- Origin: Van Nuys, California, United States
- Genres: Surf rock, garage rock
- Years active: 1996–2010
- Labels: Zombie-A-Go-Go Records; Ghastly Plastics Co.
- Members: Drums/Vocals - Norman "Baron Shivers" Cabrera; Lead Guitar - Garrett "Dr Lehos" Immel; Organ - Dave "Captain Clegg" Klein; Go-Go Ghoul - Kate "Necrobella" Cabrera; Bass - Ryan "Cousin Boris"
- Past members: Bass - Kevin "Sir Go-Go Ghostly" Hair

The Ghastly Ones are a surf–garage band from Van Nuys, California, with a late-night monster movie theme.

== History ==
The Ghastly Ones were formed by two Special FX make up/movie monster makers, Garrett Immel aka Dr. Lehos and Norman Cabrera aka Baron Shivers. They infused their love of Halloween records, late night monster movies and Screaming Lord Sutch with inspiration from early sixties surf and hot rod acts like The Lively Ones, Avengers VI, and The Del-Aires to create the first "spooky surf" band.

The band's first show was at Al's Bar on Halloween 1996, infamous in the punk world for several rowdy Misfits shows. During their early shows, the stage was often decorated with tombstones and cobwebs to give their performances the proper atmosphere.

Their unique sound and look caught the attention of Rob Zombie, who released their first album, A-Haunting We Will Go-Go in 1998 on his label Zombie-A-Go-Go Records, a subsidiary of Geffen Records. Subsequent albums were released on their independent label, Ghastly Plastics Co.

In 2007, The Ghastly Ones toured the East Coast and Japan for the first time and in 2009 they played in Nottingham, England. Their music has been featured in the SpongeBob SquarePants Halloween episode titled “Scaredy Pants” and the 2009 remake of Night of the Demons.

Drummer and co-founder Norman "Baron Shivers" is currently focusing on his career as a movie monster maker. Keyboardist Dave Klein "Captain Clegg" is currently focusing on recording and production at his own studio Dave Klein Recording. Guitarist Garrett "Dr. Lehos" is currently playing in Satan's Pilgrims and Venturesmania.

In February 2024, it was announced that the Ghastly Ones would be reuniting for the SurfoRama festival in Spain, followed by a performance during the annual Surf Guitar 101 Festival in Long Beach, California, along with an additional performance in Mexico City with Chris "Count Harlock" Barfield on bass.

== Selected discography ==
=== Albums ===
- A-Haunting We Will Go-Go (CD, LP, 1998)
- All-Plastic Assembly Kit (CD, 2005)
- Target: Draculon (CD, 2006)
- Unearthed (CD, 2007)
- Unearthed (LP, 2022)

=== EPs ===
- Dare To Go-Go Ghostly With The Ghastly Ones (1998, 7")
- Gears n' Ghoulfinks (2006, purple vinyl 7")

=== Singles ===
- "SpongeBob ScaredyPants," from SpongeBob SquarePants: Original Theme Highlights (2001)
- Flying Saucers Over Van Nuys (2006, green vinyl 7")
