= Yorba Linda High School =

Public secondary school in Yorba Linda, California, United States

Location
- 19900 Bastanchury Rd. Yorba Linda, CA 92886; Yorba Linda, (Orange County), California 92886; United States; 33°54′12.4″N 117°46′44.5″W

Information
- Type: Public
- Motto: Run with the Stampede
- Established: 2009
- School district: Placentia-Yorba Linda Unified School District
- Principal: Bird Potter
- Teaching staff: 67.65 (on an FTE basis)
- Grades: 9 to 12
- Enrollment: 1,584 (2023–2024)
- Student to teacher ratio: 23.41
- Colors: Navy, crimson, and silver
- Mascot: Mustang
- Newspaper: The Wrangler
- Yearbook: Roundup
- Website: www.ylhs.org

Yorba Linda High School (YLHS) is a public high school located in Yorba Linda, California and is part of the Placentia-Yorba Linda Unified School District.

The school's colors are navy blue, crimson, and silver. The school mascot is the Mustang. Most students who attend this school live in Yorba Linda. A small portion of Anaheim Hills with houses located north of Yorba Regional Park are also directed to this school. Before the school opened in 2009, students who lived in Yorba Linda attended El Dorado High School, and Esperanza High School (The latter two are part of the Placentia-Yorba Linda Unified School District).

The school site occupies over 70 acres (280,000 m^{2}) and has over 170,000 square feet (16,000 m^{2}) of classroom and administrative space, including a library, gymnasium, performing arts spaces, a pool, an adjacent joint-use park, baseball fields, and a large stadium facility.

== History ==
Construction of the school began in April 2007. The first students to receive diplomas from the school were the graduating class of 2012.

== Student life ==
For the 2023-2024 school year, the ethnic distribution is as follows: 41.21% White, 30.40% Asian, 22.63% Hispanic, 1.17% Black, 0.25% Hawaiian Native/Pacific Islander, 4.30% Two or More Races.

In 2019, the Mustang Business Academy officially opened the first YLHS school-wide store called Mustang Market. With a grant and authorization from the Placentia-Yorba Linda Unified School District, the goal is to teach students in the Business Management program fiscal responsibility and business leadership.

== Academics ==
To graduate from YLHS, a student is required to complete 4 years of language arts, 2 years of Math, 3 years of Social Studies, 2 years of Science, 1 year of a Foreign Language or Fine Arts, 1 year of Health/Academic Planning, 2 years of Physical Education, as well as 80 credits worth of electives, 40 hours of community service, and complete the California High School Exit Exam.

As of the 2015/2016 school year, 16 Honors Courses and 23 Advanced Placement (AP) Courses were offered.

The school was recognized as a California Distinguished School in 2013, a 2015 Gold Ribbon/Exemplary Arts High School, and in August 2017 recognized by U.S. News & World Report as one of the top high schools in the nation.

In 2019, Yorba Linda High School was recognized as a U.S. News & World Report "Best High Schools" award winner. YLHS ranked #1,200 nationwide (top 5%), #184 in California (top 7%), and as the #1 high school in the Placentia-Yorba Linda Unified School District. Yorba Linda High School also had 4 National Merit Semi-finalists.

Yorba Linda High School has two unique career pathways within the Mustang Business Academy: Culinary/Hospitality and Business Management. Within the PYLUSD school district, Yorba Linda High School is the only school to integrate these courses into its curriculum.

== Athletics ==
Yorba Linda High School won its first California Interscholastic Federation/Southern Section Division 8 football championship, defeating Burbank High School by the score of 31-21, on December 2, 2016. Also in 2013, won CIF in wrestling.

As of the 2019-2020 school year, YLHS fields teams for the following sports: aquatics, cross country, cheer and song, dance, baseball, football, men's and women's basketball, men's and women's golf, men's and women's lacrosse, men's and women's soccer, men's and women's tennis, men's and women's volleyball, softball, track and field, and wrestling.

The men's aquatics program also claimed its first second place finish in the California Interscholastic Federation (CIF)/Southern Section swimming championships on May 10, 2019.

Yorba Linda High School Men's Water Polo also won its first California Interscholastic Federation/Southern Section Division 2 water polo championship on November 13, 2021

== Notable alumni ==
- Tyler Armstrong, mountain climber and youngest person to climb Mount Aconcagua
