= Zacherle =

Zacherle is a surname. Notable people with the surname include:

- Bonnie Zacherle (born 1946), American illustrator and designer
- John Zacherle (1918–2016), American television personality
