= El Dorado High School (Placentia, California) =

Public secondary school in Placentia, California, United States

Coordinates: 33°53′32″N 117°51′22″W

- 1651 Valencia Avenue; Placentia, CA, 92870; United States

Information
- Type: Public
- Established: 1966
- School district: Placentia-Yorba Linda Unified School District
- Principal: Mike Zides
- Grades: 9–12
- Enrollment: 2,009 (2023–2024)
- Colors: Black and gold
- Athletics conference: Century League
- Mascot: Golden Hawk
- Yearbook: Año De Oro
- Website: edhs.org

El Dorado High School is a 9th–12th grade public high school located in Placentia, California. Established in 1966, El Dorado is one of four high schools in the Placentia-Yorba Linda Unified School District, and serves the northern parts of Placentia, and Yorba Linda far eastern Fullerton, (east of the 57 freeway), and a small portion of Brea. The EDHS campus is located at 1651 Valencia Avenue, approximately 29 miles from downtown Los Angeles and 18 miles from the California coastline.

The school currently has an enrollment of over 2,400 students. The school's first graduating class was the class of 1969. The campus received a major renovation in 2002. The EDHS gymnasium is dedicated to Joe Raya, a former Athletics department staff member. The theatre is dedicated to Mrs. Gai Jones, who directed the theatre department from 1967 to 2002. The tennis courts are dedicated to Coach John H Cyrus III, who was teaching and coaching there until 2018.

In 2004, Athletic director Sally Reclusado was selected as the CIF Southern Section Athletic Director of the Year. Librarian Linda Birtler was awarded the Orange County Department of Education's Outstanding Contribution to Education Award. El Dorado has also won the prestigious Blue Ribbon Award.

The school is home to the El Dorado Golden Hawks Marching Band; the band's past achievements include a performance in the Sydney Olympics Opening Ceremony, the Tournament of Roses Parade and top honors in two trips to the Hawaii International Competition.

== Marching band ==
El Dorado has an award-winning marching band, wind ensemble, symphonic band, winter drumline, colorguard, and three jazz ensembles.

The band has performed in Canada, Florida, Hawaii, and Nevada, as well as at the 2000 Sydney Olympics and 2005 and 2010 Tournament of Roses Parade. Also, the drumline and color guard performed in the opening ceremonies for the 2011 Tournament of Roses Parade. The Hawks have also performed for former President Ronald Reagan and former President George H. W. Bush.

During the 2007 marching season, El Dorado was undefeated in field tournament competition receiving sweepstakes awards at the Irvine Field Tournament, the Mira Mesa Field Tournament, the Vista Field Tournament, and the Arcadia Festival of Bands Field Tournament.. And in the 2019 season, they finished off their season with 2nd place, medaling silver at the SCSBOA 6A Championships.

El Dorado's four jazz ensembles are also well known for their high-level musicianship and straight-ahead jazz style. The three bands have consistently received top honors at local and regional competitions. In Spring 2006, El Dorado's jazz ensemble 1 was distinguished as the "Outstanding Instrumental Ensemble" at the Reno International Jazz Festival.

== Athletics ==
School teams have won various competitions as follows:

- 1975: the water polo team won the CIF SS (Southern Section) title in an exciting game played at East LA College. The Golden Hawks beat Indio High School 8–6.
- 1976: the baseball team, featuring all-CIF pitcher Dan Petry, won the 2-A baseball championship.
- 1989: the baseball team, led by all-CIF SS players Pete Janicki, Matt Luke, and Phil Nevin, won the 5-A baseball title, beating Millikan High School in the title game 2-0.
- 2010: the varsity cheer team won their first USA Spirit High School National Championship after finishing second in 2009.
- 2011: the varsity cheer team became the first California School in 23 years to win the UCA National Cheerleading Championships in Orlando Florida. Their performance was broadcast on ESPN and warranted a Foxnews LA feature upon their return. This team finished their second undefeated season and captured CIF, State as well as both the UCA and USA National Championships.
- 2025: the varsity girl's Division 3 basketball team finished 24-14 and captured CIF and State Championship, defeating Valley Christian 42-41 in Sacramento at the Golden 1 Center for their first ever State Championship in women's basketball.

== Principals ==
- Howard Roop (1966–1969)
- Marvin Stewart (1969–1973)
- Jerry Jertberg (1973–1986)
- Alvin Hawkins (1986–1988)
- Richard Bernier (1988–1991)
- Joann Ball (1991–1994)
- Joe Quartucci (1994–1999)
- Karen Wilkins (1999–2010)
- Cary Johnson (2010–2012)
- Carey Cecil (2012–2015)
- Joe Davis (2016–2024)
- David Okamoto (2024-2025)
- Michael Zides (2025–present)

== Notable alumni ==
- Bret Boone – Major League Baseball player
- Chris Buck – Oscar-winning director of Frozen
- Michael Chang – Retired pro tennis player
- Christie Clark – Actress, Days of Our Lives
- John Crawford – Co-founded alternative rock group Berlin
- Chris Cron – Major League Baseball player
- CJ Cron – Major League Baseball player
- Peter Daut – News anchor, KCBS-TV
- D-loc – Rapper Kottonmouth Kings and Kingspade
- Chris Dressel – NFL tight end, Houston Oilers and New York Jets
- Janet Evans – Olympic medal winning swimmer, and former world record holder
- Jason Freese – Keyboard player for the band Green Day
- Josh Freese – Drummer for the band The Foo Fighters, Weezer, and The Vandals
- Carolyn Hill - Professional LPGA golfer
- Till Kahrs – Recording Artist/Singer-Songwriter, Author, Communication Skills Expert
- Dan Kennedy – Professional soccer player currently with Chivas USA
- James Levesque – Bassist and founding member of Agent Orange
- Matt Luke – Retired Major League Baseball player
- Jessica McKenna – Actress, comedian, singer
- Travis Miguel – Guitarist for the band Atreyu
- Dylan Moore – Major League Baseball player
- Phil Nevin – Retired Major League Baseball player and MLB coach
- Audrina Patridge – Actress, The Hills
- Kherington Payne – Dancer (Top 10 of So You Think You Can Dance season 4) and actress
- Dan Petry – Retired Major League Baseball pitcher
- Norm Rapmund – American comic book artist
- Shawn Ray – Former professional bodybuilder
- Steve Soto – Bassist for bands the Adolescents and also founding member of Agent Orange
- Brett Tomko – Major League Baseball pitcher
- Deborah Voigt – Soprano opera singer
- Pete Woods – American comic book inker
