= Esperanza High School =

Public high school in Anaheim, Orange County, California, United States

Location
- 1830 North Kellogg Drive; Anaheim, Orange County, CA 92807-1298; United States; 33°52′10″N 117°48′10″W

Information
- School type: Public High School
- Motto: “Where Excellence is a Tradition”
- Established: 1973
- Status: Continuing
- School district: Placentia-Yorba Linda Unified School District
- NCES District ID: 0630660
- Superintendent: Doug Domene
- Area trustee: Carol Downey, Karin Freeman
- CEEB code: 050093
- NCES School ID: 063066004758
- President: Carrie Buck
- Principal: Kelly Molina
- Grades: 9 to 12
- Gender: coed
- Enrollment: 1,393 (2024–2025)
- Language: American English
- Schedule type: Bell
- Campus type: Urban
- Colours: Cardinal and gold
- Athletics: Football, Cross Country, Water polo, Volleyball, Golf, Tennis, Basketball, Wrestling, Soccer, Track and Field, Baseball, Swimming, Lacrosse, Softball
- Mascot: Aztec
- Website: www.esperanzahs.net
- Last updated: September 17, 2014

Esperanza High School (EHS) is a public high school located in Anaheim, California and is part of the Placentia-Yorba Linda Unified School District.

It is a California Distinguished School and is home to various California Interscholastic Federation (CIF) championship athletic programs; it is also home to numerous academic clubs, such as Speech and Debate, Mock Trial, and Academic Decathlon. It is a member of the Century League. The school's colors are cardinal and gold, and its mascot is the Aztec.

The school has two campuses: a main campus and a west campus connected by a pedestrian bridge over Kellogg Drive. Since 2010, west campus became known as the Freshmen Focus Campus; however, the mathematics and foreign language buildings on this campus are not reserved solely for freshmen. The west campus is the former Orchard Drive Elementary school, which the high school absorbed in 1986.

Current enrollment exceeds 1,700. Most pupils come from nearby Yorba Linda, California, Anaheim and east Placentia.

EHS Alma Mater

== Accolades ==
Esperanza is ranked in the top 25% of Orange County high schools. In 2019, U.S. News & World Report ranked the school #330 within California and #2,154 in the United States. The state ranking is up from #404 in 2017.

Previously, Esperanza was ranked 860 of the "Top 1,300 U.S. High Schools" in MSNBC/Newsweek's 2008 list.

In 2002, EHS was recognized as a California Distinguished School. Later in 2015, it was awarded The California Gold Ribbon Award.

== Athletic teams ==
- Baseball (1986: national No. 1 per USA Today)
- Men's basketball (CIF Champions, 2017)
- Women's Basketball (CIF Champions, 1980)
- Cross country
- Diving
- Football
- Men's Lacrosse
- Soccer (Men's CIF Championship 2004, Women's CIF Championship 2010)
- Softball
- Swimming (Women's CIF Champions 2012 & 2023)
- Tennis
- Track and Field
- Volleyball (CIF Championships, Men's 1993, 1997, 2002, 2007, CIF & State Champions 2013; Women's 2003, 2005)
- Water Polo (Men's CIF Championship 1992, 1994, 2003)
- Women's Lacrosse
- Wrestling
- Women's Golf
- Men's Golf (Men's CIF Championship 1986)

== Esperanza Entertainment Unit ==
The Esperanza Entertainment Unit consists of a marching band, concerts bands, color guard, and jazz bands.

== Engineering ==
Esperanza is one of nine schools selected by the SME Education Foundation's PRIME (Partnership Response in Manufacturing Education).

== Notable alumni ==
- Joseph M. Acaba, astronaut
- Jarrod Alexander, drummer of Death By Stereo, My Chemical Romance and others
- Nathan Willett, founding member, vocalist and guitarist of Cold War Kids.
- Moon Bloodgood, actress
- Heather Bown, Olympic volleyball player
- Sabrina Bryan of The Cheetah Girls and Dancing with the Stars
- Ashley Force and sister Courtney Force, drag racers for John Force Racing and daughters of John Force
- Ian Fowles, guitarist of Death By Stereo, The Aquabats, Gerard Way
- Joe Hawley, NFL player
- Jayson Jablonsky, Olympic volleyball player
- Napoleon Jinnies, NFL cheerleader for the Los Angeles Rams
- Travis Kirschke, NFL player
- Steven Lenhart, major league soccer player for San Jose Earthquakes
- Annie Lin, singer/songwriter
- Keith McDonald, major league baseball player
- Wade Meckler (born 2000), baseball outfielder for the Los Angeles Angels
- Paul Miner and Jim Miner of Death By Stereo
- Michele Mitchell, filmmaker, journalist and author
- David Newhan, major league baseball player
- Kyle Pascual, basketball player
- Kherington Payne, dancer, actress
- Chris Ryall, writer, editor, Power Rangers guest-star
- Brandon Saller, Alex Varkatzas, and Dan Jacobs of the metalcore band, Atreyu
- Vince Staples, rapper
- KZ Okpala, NBA player
- Mike Simms, MLB player, Houston Astros and Texas Rangers
- Brenden Stai, NFL player
- Alexis Thorpe, actress, known for her role as Cassie Brady on daytime drama Days of Our Lives
- Justin Viele, Major League Baseball coach for the San Francisco Giants
