= The Bomboras =

American instrumental band

- Origin: Los Angeles, California, U.S.
- Genres: Instrumental, surf, garage
- Years active: 1995–2000, 2006–present
- Members: Jake Cavaliere; Johnny DeVilla; Ben Marazzi; Evan Foster; Erik Foster
- Past members: Dave Klein; Action Andy; Von Franco; Gregg Lord Hunt; Shane "The Showman" Van Dyke

The Bomboras are an American all-instrumental surf band from Los Angeles.

== History ==
The band was formed in the summer of 1994, sharing a love of 1960s surf and garage music such as The Ventures, Booker T, and The Sonics.

Donning Day of the Dead regalia onstage, the fivesome tempered their retro-stylings with an update by way of The Ramones, The Pandoras, and Nuggets. Accompanied by frenzied Go Go girls, spitting flames, stage-diving, and destroying their own equipment, the Bomboras' livid funhouse take on surf rock became an object of fan adoration, albeit a worry to the local fire department.

The Bomboras took their name from a classic surf instrumental by the Original Surfaris (not to be confused with a different song with the same title, "Bombora," by the Australian surf combo The Atlantics) and released several albums on Burbank-based indie label Dionysus Records between 1995 and 1997. In summer 1997 Rob Zombie took notice of the band and signed them to his then newly formed Zombie a Go-Go label, which was distributed by Geffen Records. The Bomboras finally called it quits in 2000 with some of the members forming the Lords of Altamont and some members formed The Legendary Invisible Men. Drummer Dave Klein is currently running his own recording studio in Los Angeles, Dave Klein Recording. On December 31, 2006, New Year's Eve of 2007, The Bomboras played a return show in Hollywood at Vine Street Lounge (now closed). The Bomboras played a full set of songs at The Wild'O Fest in Mexico City June 16, 2018. They also played a full show at "Tiki-Au-Go-Go" at The Warehouse Restaurant in Marina Del Rey, California on January 25, 2020.

More recently, the band has been involved with the MuSick Recordings label, and released a "comeback" EP The Return Of The Up Up Sound (2021), and the first new full-length since 1998, Songs From The Beyond! in 2023.

On November 23, 2025, the band shared on their Facebook page:

"It’s been a while since we posted. A lot has changed since Tiki Oasis. What a great time! After years of commitment and contribution, Gregg Hunt and Shane Van Dyke have parted ways with The Bomboras. They will be deeply missed and forever cherished as part of our band's history. Their impact will never be replaced, and our love and respect for them will endure. Gregg and Shane, we love you and will miss sharing the stage with you. This decision changes everything for our music world. “We,” the remaining Bomboras, have decided to move forward. We thought long and hard about this, but our passion for music won’t let us give up. We care too much to let the band dissolve. How do we continue? Please meet Evan Foster, world-renowned producer and engineer of No Count Studios in Seattle, and Erik Foster, bass player extraordinaire and guitar player with an incredible resume! Oh, and did we mention these two brothers, long-time friends of the Bomboras and members of The Boss Martians, a top surf band since the early nineties? Gregg and Shane, you will be missed. You will never be replaced.

Shows in SoCal coming soon! We hope to see you there. The Bomboras"

== Line up ==
- Jake Cavaliere – keys/vocals
- Johnny DeVilla - guitar
- Ben Marazzi – drums
- Evan Foster – guitar
- Erik Foster – bass

== Selected discography ==
- Savage Island, 1995 The band's first album for Dionysius, Savage Island cost only $200 to make and was recorded in just two days.
- Swingin' Singles!, 1996
- Organ Grinder, 1995/1997
- Starship Troopers, 1997
- It Came from Pier 13!, 1997 The album was described by Stewart Mason on AllMusic as being "as good as neo-surf instrumental albums get"
- Board Headz Movie, 1998
- Head Shrinkin' Fun, 1998
- The Return Of The Up Up Sound, 2021
- Songs From Beyond!, 2023
