= All the People Said Amen =

Compilation album by Matt Maher
- Released: April 23, 2013
- Genres: Worship, CCM
- Length: 66:23
- Label: Essential
- Producers: Matt Maher; Paul Moak

Matt Maher chronology
The Love in Between (2011)	All the People Said Amen (2013)	Saints and Sinners (2015)

All the People Said Amen is the first compilation album by contemporary worship music recording artist Matt Maher, released on April 23, 2013. It is his fourth album with Essential Records, and his seventh overall release. The album was produced by Matt Maher and Paul Moak.

== Music and lyrics ==
Writing for CCM Magazine, Grace S. Aspinwall said that Maher was "armed with his deep and soulful vocal", which she found that "his voice is radiant on this project." Joshua Andre of Christian Music Zine told that "with Matt oozing creativity, poetry, metaphors and engagement, not to mention the presence of the Holy Spirit," and this was because Andre perceived "Matt's offerings are honest, thoughtful and full of references to God's goodness and righteousness." In addition, Andre found that "Matt Maher has really recorded and performed out of his skin in this effort, and it shows on this professional and sophisticated album". However, Cross Rhythms' Stephen Curry wrote that "the live tracks, with the exception of the tumultuous, Jewish flavoured 'It Is Good', do not, in truth, add anything fresh by being 'in concert'", yet he told that "the new songs featured are the infectious pop 'All The People Said Amen', the passionate 'Burning in My Soul', a duet with Audrey Assad, the ballad 'Lord I Need You' and perhaps the best of the new songs, 'Mighty Fortress' with its haunting yet uplifting melody."

Indie Vision Music's Jonathan Andre gleaned that"Matt's lyrical ingeniousness and maturity has improved as he delivers some of the most passionate and personal songs of his musical career so far." At Jesus Freak Hideout, Jen Rose believed that "the songs are arranged and produced well, capturing the energy of the live show in a way that sounds like all the people involved are truly enjoying themselves. It's not a groundbreaking live record, but it does showcase Maher's songwriting and stage presence better than a standard hits compilation could." Kevin Davis of New Release Tuesday highlighted that the album "delivers raw, worshipful moments that draw the line between the divine and the everyday." Furthermore, Davis evoked that "this album provides listeners with thirteen tracks that seek to give a voice to humanity's acceptance of God's love in any circumstance", and that "Matt Maher's enthusiastic and reverent style of writing and singing praise and worship songs has consistently been a draw for me. Maher's prayerful sentiments are consistently filled with his personal adoration of God." The Phantom Tollbooth's Michael Dalton found that "though there are intimate moments with appropriate reverence, much of this has an air of boldness and confidence", and this is due to the "muscular backing from a band that rocks and an exuberant audience make it a boisterous affair."

At Worship Leader, Amanda Furbeck called the album "sincere, honest, and unpretentious," and found that Maher "adds myriad dimensions to worship with his latest album." In doing so, Furbeck said this happened "with relevant and inspired lyric writing, and obvious passion for the Gospel, this multi-faceted, album offers songs of praise and worship, messages of hope, and heart-felt cries to the Lord." Louder Than the Music's Jono Davies found the release "doesn't sound like a normal live worship album. There is a unique rawness, even a rockier edge to the times of worship. It shows that not all live worship albums need to sound the same." Lastly, Thom Jurek of Allmusic told that "for a contemporary Christian recording, the live material is uncharacteristically loose and raw, giving the proceedings a kinetic feel and sense of immediacy". At HM, Doug Van Pelt noted how this is "a fine blend of rootsy, bluesy, and heartfelt Gospel."

== Reception ==
=== Critical ===
Professional ratings
Review scores
Source	Rating
Allmusic	4/5 stars
CCM Magazine	4/5 stars
Cross Rhythms	7/10 squares
HM	3/5 stars
Indie Vision Music	3/5 stars
Jesus Freak Hideout	3.5/5 stars
Louder Than the Music	4.5/5 stars
New Release Tuesday	4.5/5 stars
The Phantom Tollbooth	4/5 stars
Worship Leader	4.5/5 stars

All the People Said Amen has received generally favorable reviews from the seven music critics. Davis of New Release Tuesday called the release "his most dynamic." At Worship Leader, Furbeck proclaimed that the release is "the apex of Matt Maher's considerable musical expression to date", and found the album contained "a gift of songs for the Church of today". Christian Music Zine's Andre rated the album a 4.25-out-of-five, and evoked that the effort "is a pleasant experience" to hear. Jurek of Allmusic noted that the release for listeners "will prove indispensable." At CCM Magazine, Aspinwall found the "album rooted with a simplistic polish." At Louder Than the Music, Davies proclaimed this as a "brilliant album from Matt", and that it "is up there as one of the most original live worship albums". Michael Dalton of The Phantom Tollbooth wrote that "there may be many ways to worship, but this is one way to do it right", and this is because the album "combines a little of the singer/songwriter muse with the best in rock."

Cross Rhythms' Curry told that "to shoehorn four new studio recordings into the package make for an oddly uneven listen", and that "had this been a four-track EP of new material it may have achieved nine or 10 squares." Rose of Jesus Freak Hideout affirmed that these songs "work even better than the original versions." At Indie Vision Music, Andre stated that the songs were "full of life, encouragement and enthusiastic motivation" that would "attract listeners of his music as well as fans of other similar contemporary/worship artists". At HM, Doug Van Pelt told that the release "has the best of both worlds for discriminating believers that love worship but hate cheese."

=== Commercial ===
On the May 11, 2013 charts, the album charted at No. 115 on the Billboard 200 and at No. 5 on Christian Album in the United States. On the chart dated April 5, 2014, the album reached a new peak of No. 88 on the Billboard 200.

== Track listing ==
Tracklist
No.	Title	Writer(s)	Original studio recording on	Length
1.	"All the People Said Amen" (Studio)	Matt Maher, Paul Moak, Trevor Morgan		3:00
2.	"Alive Again" (Live, recorded in Detroit, Michigan)	Jason Ingram, Maher	Alive Again	5:08
3.	"Burning in My Soul" (Studio)	Daniel Carson, Maher, Jesse Reeves, Brett Younker		3:45
4.	"Lord, I Need You" (Studio)	Carson, Maher, Christy Nockels, Reeves, Kristian Stanfill		3:25
5.	"Great Things" (Live, recorded at Legends, University of Notre Dame)	Maher	Empty & Beautiful	5:27
6.	"On My Way" (Live, recorded at Legends, University of Notre Dame)	Maher, Moak	The Love in Between	6:26
7.	"Hold Us Together" (Live, recorded at Legends, University of Notre Dame)	Maher, Steve Wilson	Alive Again	4:17
8.	"Your Grace Is Enough/Here I Am Lord" (Live, recorded in St. Louis, Missouri)	Maher	Welcome to Life and Empty & Beautiful/new track	6:07
9.	"Adoration" (Live, recorded in Detroit, Michigan)	St. Thomas Aquinas, Maher	Overflow	5:59
10.	"Christ Is Risen" (Live, recorded in Indianapolis, Indiana)	Mia Fieldes, Maher	Alive Again	6:28
11.	"Turn Around" (Live, recorded in Detroit, Michigan)	Michael Boggs, Maher, Morgan	The Love in Between	5:34
12.	"Mighty Fortress" (Studio)	Fieldes, Maher, Moak		5:15
13.	"It Is Good" (Live, recorded in Baltimore, Maryland)	Maher, Paul Wilbur	new track	5:32
Total length:				66:23

== Personnel ==
Studio Tracks (1, 3, 4 & 12)

- Matt Maher – vocals, acoustic piano, programming, acoustic guitars, string arrangements
- Paul Moak – acoustic piano, Hammond B3 organ, programming, acoustic guitars, electric guitars, ganjo, mandolin-banjo, mandolin, percussion, backing vocals
- Tim Lauer – keyboards (4)
- Kenny Butler – electric guitars
- Kemi Nodolo – bass (1, 3, 12)
- Tony Lucido – bass (4)
- Richard Scott – drums (1, 3, 12)
- Jeremy Lutito – drums (4), percussion (4)
- Austin Hoke – cello
- Eleonore Denig – violin
- Audrey Assad – backing vocals (4)

Choir

- Kat Davis, Matthew Faulkenbury, Ally Fuerst, Katie Green, Kevin Huffman, Sean Kelly, Nicole Koester, Connor Maher, Kristin Maher, Matt Maher, Paul Moak, Matt Mundt, Dan Rauter, Richard Scott, Shimmy, Mike Snider, AJ Strout, Ali Tigh, Jimi Williams and Abby Wood

Live Tracks (2, 5-11 & 13)

- Matt Maher – lead vocals, acoustic guitars, electric guitars
- Scotty Wilbanks – keyboards, step-out backing vocals (6)
- Kenny Butler – electric guitars
- Kemi Nodolo – bass guitar
- Richard Scott – drums
- Paul Moak – additional backing vocals

== Production ==
Studio Tracks (1, 3, 4 & 12)

- Paul Moak – producer, engineer
- Justin March – assistant engineer
- Devin Vaughan – assistant engineer
- Sean Moffitt – mixing (1, 3, 12)
- Warren David – mix assistant (1, 3, 12)
- Christopher Stevens – mixing (4)
- Lani Crump – production coordinator

Live Tracks (2, 5-11 & 13)

- Matt Maher – producer, engineer
- Harold Rubens – engineer
- Mark Zellmer – engineer
- Michael Davis – mixing
- Drew Douthit – audio editing
- Jonathan Jost – audio editing

Additional credits

- Blaine Barcus – A&R
- Jason Root – A&R
- Ken Love – mastering
- Matt Maher – art direction, design
- Tim Parker – art direction, design
- Michael Wilson – photography
- Kyle Trafton – additional photography
- Steve Ziegelmeyer – additional photography

== Charts ==
Chart (2013)	Peak position
US Billboard 200	88
US Top Christian Albums (Billboard)	5
