= Jolla (disambiguation) =

Jolla may refer to:

- Jolla, a Finnish company that produces mobile devices and develops software
  - Jolla (mobile phone), a smartphone by Jolla
  - Jolla OS, a misnomer for Sailfish OS, a mobile operating system developed by Jolla
- La Jolla, a neighborhood of San Diego, California
- La Jolla Band of Luiseño Indians, a Native American tribe
- La Jolla, Placentia, California, a neighborhood of Placentia, California
- USS La Jolla (SSN-701), a United States Navy Submarine
- La Joya (disambiguation)
