= Jackie Francois =

American musician

Jackie Francois is an American Christian musician, singer, songwriter, guitarist, speaker, and youth minister from Placentia, California. It was through her involvement with Life Teen that led Francois to engage in various retreats, conferences, and World Youth Day gatherings. From these, Francois came to be more involved in her Catholic faith, which is reflected in her musical and ministerial work. Her debut album, Your Kingdom is Glorious, was released in 2008, followed by the release of a second album, Divine Comedy, in mid-2012.

== Early life ==
Francois was born and raised in Orange County, California. She was a regular attendee of St. Joseph's Catholic Church in Placentia, California for many years. Born into a musically talented family, she began singing at a young age. She learned how to play violin as a child, then taught herself to play guitar in high school. Upon graduating high-school as valedictorian of her class of 480 students, Francois found her passion, and became actively involved in youth ministry, which she continues with today.

== Evangelical ministry ==
Francois travels both nationally and internationally over 160,000 miles (260,000 km) each year, preaching to youth and using her musical talent to enhance various gatherings. Her goal is to communicate to her audience that she believes love and being loved by God is within the teachings of the Catholic Church. She has sung at events such as World Youth Day 2011 in Spain, March 4 Life Youth Rally and Mass in Washington D.C., Steubenville Youth Conferences, Life Teen Training Conferences in the Netherlands and Phoenix, and various Diocesan Youth events. She is set to be a keynote speaker for the National Catholic Youth Conference("NCYC") 2015, estimated to draw 20,000–25,000 high school teens to Indianapolis. She was a keynote speaker for NCYC 2013, held in Indianapolis as well.

== Musical career ==
Francois's professional music career first surfaced in June 2003 when she was discovered by spritandsong.com's recording artist, Tom Booth, who listened to several of her self-recorded songs. Booth and his family continued to be involved in Francois's ministry, encouraging her both spiritually and musically, and providing opportunities to perform at conferences and events with attendance up to 20,000 people.

Her first album, Your Kingdom is Glorious, was released to the public in 2008. She said in an interview, "I hope people enjoy this CD and sing this music in many worship settings. That's the sole purpose of these songs—to praise God with them." The album name was inspired by spiritual reflection on the feast day of Christ the King, which falls on the last Sunday of Ordinary Time within the liturgical calendar of the Catholic Church.

Francois' second album, Divine Comedy, displays her approach to her music ministry. She uses it to portray life as the "divine comedy", ending with marriage with God. Her album represents the development of her musical ministry.

Jackie Francois's music is published by Oregon Catholic Press and can be found in many of OCP's missalette and hymnal products, including Breaking Bread, Music Issue, and Spirit & Song.

== Reviews ==
Your Kingdom is Glorious, Francois' first album, received positive review from CatholicMom.com. "Francois is not just a singer – she is a very capable songwriter as well... Your Kingdom is Glorious is an album I will listen to again and again."

Her album Divine Comedy was described as "very uplifting, and very enjoyable to listen to, a very good album" by A Catholic View. She was also praised for her album in the publication Through a Glass Onion, as it stated: “Divine Comedy is an expression of who Jackie François is and of her profound trust and faith in God. In this eight-track album, Jackie has gifted the Church with a blend of ballads and upbeat compositions that remind the listener of the joy of living in Christ’s love."

Spiritandsong.com general manager Robert Feduccia commended Francois' work in saying: "I'm excited for new fans to discover what the spiritandsong.com family already knows—Jackie is a rare talent with absolute commitment to her faith."

== Style ==
Francois music falls within the Christian/gospel genre of the library of music. She places emphasis mainly on vocals in her songs, of which she writes herself. She also uses acoustic accompanists in her compilations when applicable. Guitar, keyboard, percussion, and vocals are the prominent instruments, providing the acoustic and mellow tone to listeners.

== Personal life ==
Francois is married to fellow Life Teen author Bobby Angel since August 10, 2013. Francois' personal leisure interests include the beach, traveling, food, reading, God, volleyball, and bowling.

Francois is a webcast host of "The Commons" on spiritandsong.com, as well as a host for an upcoming Confirmation DVD series with Ascension Press. Francois maintains the message of faith to be "someone who reminds people of Heaven in the busyness of everyday life" by use of humor, prayerfulness, and song. She also currently co-authors a blog with her husband, www.jackieandbobby.com.

== Discography ==
Your Kingdom is Glorious Tracks:

1. Holy Are You, Lord
2. Joy
3. For So Long
4. Your Kingdom is Glorious
5. God, My Father
6. Be Forgiven
7. Blessed Are You, Lord
8. Plans
9. Your Will
10. The Power of Your Love
11. My Soul Rejoices
12. Old Fashioned Love Song

Divine Comedy Tracks:

1. Divine Comedy
2. Everything You
3. Your Love Is Better
4. Everything I Need
5. From Glory to Glory (We Adore You)
6. Cornerstone
7. New Creation
8. Beautiful One
