= La Joya =

La Joya (Spanish: "The Jewel") may refer to:

== Places ==
=== United States ===
- La Joya, Texas, a city
- La Joya, New Mexico
- La Jolla, San Diego, California, a seaside community
- La Jolla, Placentia, California
- La Joya, California, former name of Green Valley, Los Angeles County, California
- La Joya Community High School, a school located in Avondale, Arizona

=== Mexico ===
- La Joya, Baja California, a city in the state of Baja California
- La Joya, Morelos, a town in the state of Morelos
- La Joya (archaeological site), in Veracruz
- La Joya (Mexico City Metrobús), a BRT station in Mexico City

=== Peru ===
- La Joya District, a district in Arequipa Province, Arequipa Region

== Other ==
- Paulo Dybala, an Argentine footballer

== See also ==
- Jolla (disambiguation)
