= What a Friend =

Single by Matt Maher

from the album Echoes
- Released: September 15, 2017
- Recorded: 2017
- Genre: Worship; CCM
- Length: 3:17
- Label: Essential
- Songwriters: Matt Maher; Matthew Hein; Adam Palmer; Abbie Parker
- Producers: Ed Kerr; Dan Galbraith

Matt Maher singles chronology
"Your Love Defends Me" (2017)	"What a Friend" (2017)	"Born on That Day" (2018)

Music video
- "What a Friend" on YouTube

"What a Friend" is a song performed by Canadian contemporary Christian music (CCM) artist Matt Maher. The song was released as the second single from his 2017 album Echoes on September 15, 2017. The song peaked at No. 10 on the US Hot Christian Songs chart, becoming his seventh Top 10 single from that chart. It lasted 26 weeks on the overall chart. The song is played in an E major key, and 110 beats per minute.

== Background ==
"What a Friend" was released on September 15, 2017, as the second single from his fifth studio album Echoes. The song samples the Christian hymn What a Friend We Have in Jesus by Joseph M. Scriven, who wrote it in 1855 to comfort his mother in Iceland while he was living in Canada. Maher shows God’s faithfulness even in the midst of personal sorrow and devastation. On the song, Maher sings about the joy of our friendship with the Saviour. Aleteia described the song as "switching gears from quiet worship to bouncing folk-rock, with a country-pop hook, where the piece is infused with a jubilant energy, which is aided by a perfectly employed gospel-ish choir."

== Music video ==
A lyric video was released on February 23, 2018. A live version of the song was released on June 15, 2018, featuring Christian music singer Jason Crabb.

== Track listing ==
CD release

1. "What a Friend" – 3:17
2. "What a Friend (Lead Sheet (Medium Key)" – 3:17
3. "What a Friend (Vocal Demonstration)" – 3:4
4. "What a Friend (High Key With Background Vocals)" – 3:14
5. "What a Friend (High Key Without Background Vocals)" – 3:14
6. "What a Friend (Medium Key With Background Vocals)" – 3:14
7. "What a Friend (Medium Key Without Background Vocals)" – 3:14
8. "What a Friend (Low Key With Background Vocals)" – 3:14
9. "What a Friend (Low Key Without Background Vocals)" – 3:14

== Charts ==
=== Weekly charts ===
Chart (2018)	Peak position
US Christian AC (Billboard)	3
US Christian Airplay (Billboard)	2
US Hot Christian Songs (Billboard)	10
US Christian AC Indicator (Billboard)	3

=== Year-end charts ===
Chart (2018)	Peak position
US Christian AC (Billboard)	10
US Christian Airplay (Billboard)	14
US Christian Songs (Billboard)	29
