= The Love in Between =

Studio album by Matt Maher
- Released: September 20, 2011
- Studios: The Smoakstack (Nashville, Tennessee)
- Genres: CCM, worship
- Length: 47:42
- Label: Essential Records
- Producers: Matt Maher; Paul Moak

Matt Maher chronology
| Alive Again (2009) | The Love in Between (2011) | All the People Said Amen (2013) |

The Love in Between is the third studio album by contemporary Christian musician Matt Maher, released on September 20, 2011. It is his third album with Essential Records. It was released on September 20, 2011.

== Critical reception ==
Professional ratings
Review scores
| Source | Rating |
|---|---|
| Allmusic | 3.5/5 stars |
| Alpha Omega News | A |
| Alt Rock Live | 9/10 stars |
| Christian Broadcasting Network | 4/5 spins |
| CCM Magazine | 4/5 stars |
| Christian Music Review | (4.75/5) |
| Christianity Today | 3/5 stars |
| Cross Rhythms | 7/10 stars |
| Indie Vision Music | 3/5 stars |
| Jesus Freak Hideout | 3/5 stars 2.5/5 stars |
| Louder Than the Music | 4/5 stars |
| New Release Tuesday | 4/5 stars |
| The Phantom Tollbooth | 4/5 stars |

Allmusic's David Jeffries evoked about this "album that would play just as well at any given heartland bar on Friday night as it would after worship on Sunday." He noted "even though the big, dramatic rock moments and the sociological storytelling might throw some returning fans, his love for his fellow man shines through, so the driving force remains the same even when it’s not always called out by name."

Alpha Omega News' Tom Frigoli surmised "'The Love In Between' continues to paint the gospel in a relevant way with a bold, new sound." Also, he wrote that "Matt’s new album really caught my attention. He’ stepped out of his comfort zone and into a fresh, bold new sound, yet his profound, unwavering message remains. Overall, the album features a strong, fun, southern rock sound, which I found refreshing and exciting."

Alt Rock Live's Jonathan Faulkner cautioned that if the listener wants his past worship style albums in this effort "you will be disappointed, however if you are looking for a strong outing that will encourage and challenge you then look no further The Love in Between will do just that." Further, he summed up by saying that "All in all The Love in Between exceeds expectations initially set for it. It will most defiantly be a favorite of fans of Matt Maher for a long time to come. I highly recommend this album if you are looking for a present or just want a strong addition to your collection."

Christian Broadcasting Network's Chris Carpenter alluded to the album "fusing equal parts rock, folk, and some blues scattered in the mix, Matt Maher has crafted a gem on his third release". He noted the album "definitely shows significant growth over previous releases".

CCM Magazine's Andy Argyrakis said the album "explores themes of suffering, grace and redemption over folk and American instrumentation (albeit pedestrian at times) that strikes a stable balance between building up the body of Christ and offering comfort to the weary."

Christian Music Review's Justin Morden stated this album "brings up the topics that many Christians are going through today: suffering, doubt, pain. However, Matt Maher reminds us that there is Someone who cares about us, that we do mean something, and that there is hope. Through this album, Matt talks about the Lord’s great love and how we can always find refuge and a Savior through Him. With encouraging lyrics and a great combination of pop and worship music, The Love In Between is a solid record that will not disappoint Maher fans and is sure to delight Contemporary Christian Music listeners as well."

Christianity Today's Andy Argyrakis noted that "musically, Maher's a little generic, though he really shines on the gritty acoustic rocker "Turn Around" and the Americana-inspired "Every Little Prison (Deliver Me)," offering comfort to weary. Overall, the project showcases Maher's ability to seamlessly switch between keyboard and guitar."

Cross Rhythms's Martin I. Smith criticized the album that "there's nothing here that'll hush modern worship's critics. If you're not much enamoured by their complaints anyway, you'll do no wrong by picking this up – Maher is a skilled contributor to the genre (or style, or movement – whatever it is!)."

Indie Vision Music's Jonathan Andre wrote that "As I had a listen to the album as a whole, I can safely say that this is my favourite album from Matt. Featuring a maturity where he is able to strip everything away so that listeners can take a glimpse into his vulnerabilities; Matt offers up 12 songs of redemption and suffering, freedom and hope, all pointing to Christ as he acknowledges the Live Giver in every situation. From soft ballads to rocking tunes, there is a certain country feel to this album as Matt introduces the genre into his music." In addition, Andre called the album "a solid improvement on Matt’s first two releases, with a more expansive musical genre and experimentation, giving his musical ability more assertion within a CCM industry that predominately ‘plays it safe’ musically. Releasing on a day with Leeland’s The Great Awakening and needtobreathe’s The Reckoning, Matt Maher’s album is not unnoticed as he releases an album that serves the purpose of encouragement and raising the questions that need to be asked, about where our identity is in, and what the Lord is showing us as we continue the journey of life in all its wonder and mystery. Kudos to Matt for creating an enjoyable album; a certain purchase for fans of his previous albums as well as Audrey Assad and Chris Tomlin."

Jesus Freak Hideout's Ben Cardenas said this album "probably had Christian music fans on their toes for a while, but if those who waited for its arrival weren't fans of his earlier projects, this new one doesn't promise too much in the way of progress. On the bright side, it's a step in the right direction." He left off on a positive note that this album "might be a step towards a better sound for the singer/songwriter. For readers who have never heard of him, definitely still check this album out. You may enjoy it, but if you're a bit pickier about quality, this might not do it for you. I look forward to the hopeful progression of Maher's next album."

Jesus Freak Hideout's Samantha Schaumberg noted that "surprisingly breaks away from being classified as a straightforward worship album. While it includes softer worship and contemporary tracks, other genre accents can also be found." She was critical about the album because it "contains quite a bit of filler. While Maher should be commended for not producing yet another strictly worship album, what he does offer this time around cannot be considered remarkable."

Louder Than the Music's Jono Davies alluded to how this album takes a "look at the ideas of suffering, grace, redemption and hope." Davies noted to Maher as being "a strong songwriter and this album has a style that is distinctive to him. There are quite a few stronger tracks that could have made it onto my standout tracks list".

New Release Tuesday's Kelly Sheads said this album "continues this desire to see the Church be more intentional in worship, while relating to those still searching for God. Making this combination work in one album is a hard thing to do, but Maher pulls it off beautifully." She noted this album as being "unique in its folk-Americana sound and in its ability to reach anyone with ears to listen. This album was designed to “take church from within the four walls to the handshake between two people,” and I believe it does just that."

The Phantom Tollbooth's Michael Dalton called the album "a pleasant surprise" because it "feels different than its predecessor. The emotion is raw and the sound edgier", which contains Maher's "guitar prowess was a highlight. His influence gives this a rock sound that complements the gritty lyrics." Dalton finished with saying that he was "glad that Maher chose to make a pop rock record that explores the reach for God. This sounds fresh, and the truthfulness is a form of worship that we can appreciate. If you can relate to struggle, this CD will resonate."

== Track listing ==
CD track order
| No. | Title | Writer(s) | Length |
|---|---|---|---|
| 1. | "Rise Up" | Maher, Kenny Butler, Ike Ndolo | 3:23 |
| 2. | "Turn Around" | Maher, Michael Boggs, Trevor Morgan | 4:13 |
| 3. | "Heaven Help Me" | Maher, Paul Moak | 3:46 |
| 4. | "Every Little Prison (Deliver Me)" | Maher, Mia Fieldes | 3:41 |
| 5. | "Woke Up in America" | Maher, Moak, Chris Tomlin | 4:39 |
| 6. | "Heaven and Earth" | Maher, Dan Muckala | 4:22 |
| 7. | "Write Your Love on My Heart" | Maher, Jason Ingram | 3:08 |
| 8. | "On My Way" | Maher, Moak | 4:04 |
| 9. | "New State of Mind" | Maher, Moak | 3:22 |
| 10. | "My Only Love" | Maher | 3:34 |
| 11. | "Everything and Nothing" | Maher, Fieldes | 5:01 |
| 12. | "The Spirit and the Bride" | Maher, Leeland Mooring, Robbie Seay | 4:27 |
| Total length: | | | 47:42 |

== Personnel ==
- Matt Maher – vocals, acoustic piano, programming, acoustic guitar, electric guitar, string arrangements
- Tim Lauer – acoustic piano, Wurlitzer electric piano, Hammond B3 organ, programming, harmonica, backing vocals
- Paul Moak – acoustic piano, Hammond B3 organ, programming, acoustic guitar, electric guitar, baritone guitar, pedal steel guitar, backing vocals
- Tyler Burkum – acoustic guitar, electric guitar, banjo, backing vocals
- Tony Lucido – bass, backing vocals
- Jeremy Lutito – drums, percussion, programming, backing vocals
- Will Sayles – drums
- Cara Slaybaugh – cello
- Eleonore Denig – violin
- Ametria Dock – backing vocals
- Jason Eskridge – backing vocals
- Natasha Williams – backing vocals
- Kate York – backing vocals

Choir

- Jason Eskridge – choir arrangements
- Kimberly Baker, Ben Brown, Kenny Butler, Lesley Caraway, Kat Davis, Matt Ewald, Colton Gatlin, Liz George, Ashley Goins, Jeff Gunkel, David Gutekunst, Calla Horner, Kevin Huffman, Douglas Q. Hutchings, Mark Mattingly, Jennifer Miller, Ryan Mitchell, Corrina Ndolo, Kemi Ndolo, Jenn Pape, Keri Potter, Dan Rauter, Kristina Rehberg, Lauren Roman, Jason Root, Tommy Rose, Carol Roundtree, Richard Scott, AJ Strout, Wesley Switzer, John Thompson, Charles Van Dyke, Kirstin Watson, Nathan Westerfield, Jimi D. Williams, Nina Williams, Jamie Wilson and Abby Wood – choir singers

== Production ==
- Blaine Barcus – A&R
- Matt Maher – producer
- Paul Moak – producer, engineer, mixing
- Justin Dowse – assistant engineer
- Justin March – assistant engineer
- Shane D. Wilson – mixing
- Lani Crump – mix coordinator
- Brad Blackwood – mastering at Euphonic Masters (Memphis, Tennessee)
- Beth Lee – art direction
- Tim Parker – art direction, design
- Matthew Priestley – photography
- Sammy Elle – grooming
- Talitha Moak – wardrobe

== Charts ==
=== Album ===
| Chart (2011) | Peak positions |
|---|---|
| US Billboard 200 | 97 |
| US Billboard Christian Albums | 7 |

=== Singles ===
| Year | Single | Peak chart positions |
| Year | Single | US Christian |
|---|---|---|
| 2011 | "Turn Around" | 5 |

=== Year-end ===
| Year | Single | Positions |
| Year | Single | US Christian |
|---|---|---|
| 2011 | "Turn Around" | 22 |
