= Audrey Gregory =

Jamaican American health care administrator and nurse

- Born: Kingston, Jamaica
- Education: BSN, MSN, MHA, Georgia Southern (2001); PhD, Lynn University (2011)
- Occupation: Health care administrator
- Years active: 2001–present
- Spouse: Owen Gregory
- Children: 3 children
- Medical career
- Profession: Registered nurse
- Institutions: Delray Medical Center; Saint Francis Hospital-Memphis; Placentia-Linda Hospital; Saint Francis Hospital-Bartlett; Detroit Medical Center; AdventHealth

Audrey Gregory is a Jamaican American health care administrator and former registered nurse. She worked at Tenet Healthcare for seventeen years before joining AdventHealth.

== Early life and education ==
Gregory was born in Kingston, Jamaica to a mother who was a teacher. She later moved to the United States for a higher education, where she earned an Associate of Science in Nursing. In 2001, she graduated from Georgia Southern University with a Bachelor of Science in Nursing, a Master of Science in Nursing, and a Master of Science in Health Services Administration. In 2011, she graduated from Lynn University with a Doctorate in Global Leadership.

== Career ==
After she graduated Gregory worked at a small hospital by Fort Stewart as a registered nurse. In 2004, Gregory began working at Delray Medical Center, as director of emergency services. She then became director of nursing and chief nursing officer in 2008. In 2011, Gregory was named COO of Saint Francis Hospital-Memphis. On October 28, 2014, Gregory was named CEO of Placentia-Linda Hospital. On May 24, 2016, Gregory was named market CEO and CEO of Saint Francis Hospital-Memphis and also as market CEO of Saint Francis Hospital-Bartlett. On October 15, 2019, Gregory was named president of Detroit Medical Center and CEO of its midtown adult hospitals: Detroit Receiving Hospital, Harper University Hospital, Heart Hospital, and Hutzel Women's Hospital. On January 1, 2020, Gregory became the CEO of Detroit Medical Center after its CEO Tony Tedeschi retired.On April 20, she had been chosen by Gretchen Whitmer to the Michigan Coronavirus Task Force on Racial Disparities. On September 16, 2021, it was announced that Audrey Gregory was leaving Detroit Medical Center. The last day that she worked for Tenet Healthcare was October 22. While she was in Detroit, Gregory was also on the Michigan Health & Hospital Association's board of trustees and was a board member for the Detroit Regional Chamber.

Gregory is also a member of the American Heart Association's Go Red for Women Executive Leadership Team.

On September 20, 2021, Gregory was announced as the president and CEO of AdventHealth Central Florida's Division-North Region. On October 25, she took office when David Ottati became executive vice president and CEO of AdventHealth West Florida Division. In November 2023, Gregory became the executive vice president and CEO of AdventHealth East Florida Division. In May 2025, she was became the executive vice president and CEO of the newly created Multi-Division Delivery Network.

== Family ==
Many of Gregory's relatives in Jamaica are nurses and pastors. She married Owen and later moved to Germany where her husband was stationed in the United States Army. The couple later moved to Savannah, Georgia. Gregory and her husband have three children, Olivia, Owen and Omari.
