= UCI Health – Placentia =

Hospital in California

- UC Irvine Health
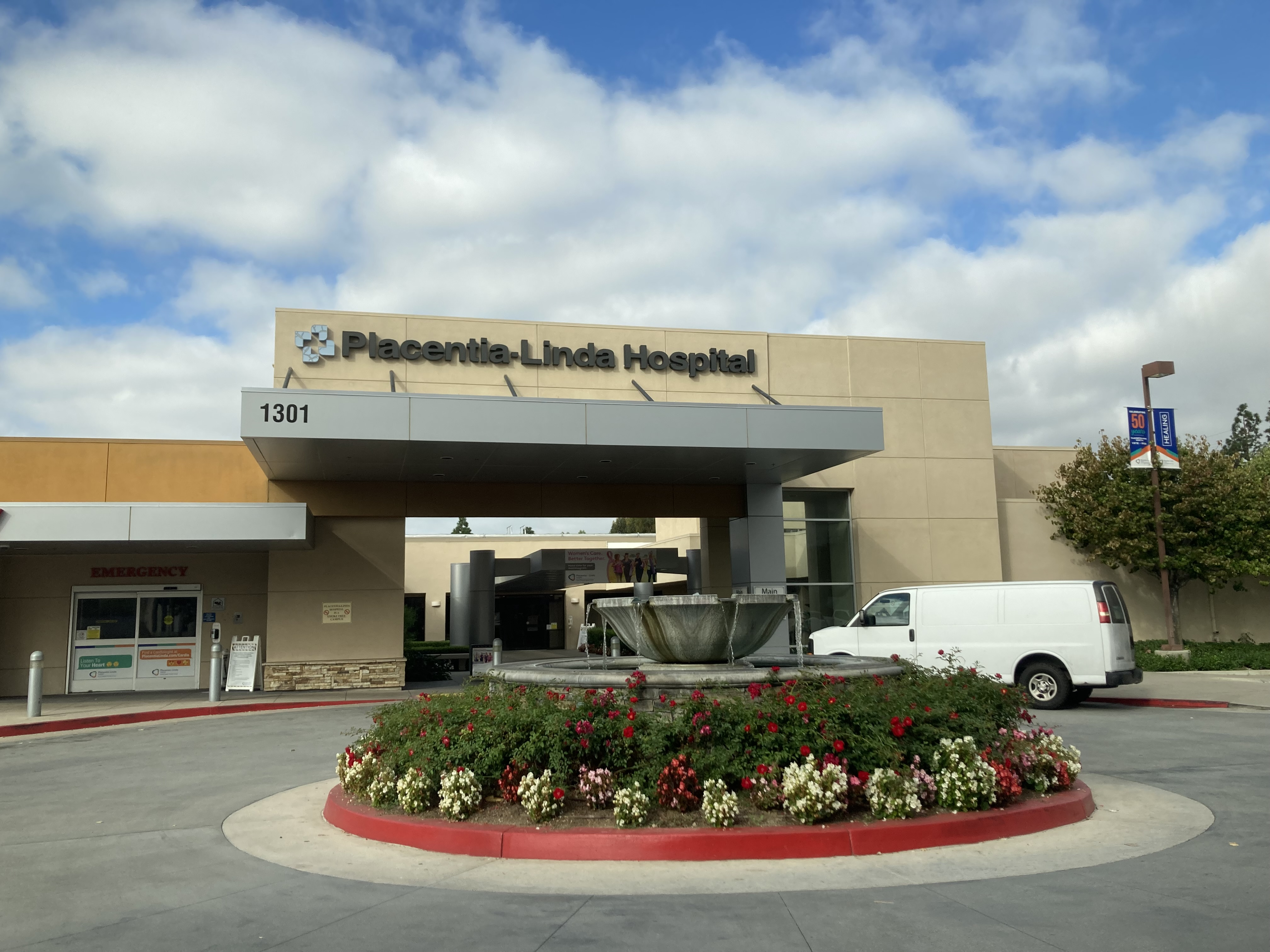
- The hospital's entrance in 2023, prior to the rebranding

Geography
- Location: 1041 E Yorba Linda Boulevard, Suite 309, Placentia, California, United States
- Coordinates: 33.8876°N 117.8431°W

Organization
- Care system: Private hospital
- Type: General hospital

Services
- Beds: 114

History
- Former name: Placentia-Linda Hospital
- Opened: September 27, 1972

Links
- Lists: Hospitals in California

UCI Health – Placentia, formerly Placentia-Linda Hospital, is a for-profit hospital in Placentia, California, United States that serves Northern Orange County. It was formerly owned by health care provider Tenet Healthcare but is now owned by UC Irvine Health.

== History ==
The hospital opened on September 27, 1972, by 19 physicians from the community to serve the area's swiftly increasing population. Its first patient was Maxwell Litt, who was admitted three days before the official opening. Staff had to get food from a restaurant because the kitchen had not been opened yet. The hospital also had a volunteer program called the Guild, which was established in the same year. In January 1973, its first newsletter was published, going by the name of "Hospital-ity".

The Cardiac Rehab Center, which cares for heart attack victims and people with coronary artery disease, opened in 1980. Thomas Charles Quintana was the first baby born at the newly-opened Baby Pavilion on December 28, 1985. In 2008, the New Rose Medical Plaza, which was to be used for diagnostic imaging, opened, while the Surgical Pavilion was completed in 2010.

In late June 2010, the hospital was selected by its parent company, Tenet Healthcare, with four other hospitals in the United States, to add a feature to their website that allows patients to see the estimated time between hospital admittance and being given a bed. It was chosen because of its already existing electronic health record system. The Wound Care Center began operations in 2012. In 2013, the Emergency Room was renovated.

Healthcare workers picketed at the hospital in October 2022, protesting against low wages and understaffing.

On February 1, 2024, UCI Health, part of the University of California, Irvine, agreed to purchase Placentia-Linda Hospital from Tenet Healthcare. UCI Health officially took over the management of the hospital on March 27. It was subsequently rebranded to UCI Health – Placentia.

== Controversies ==
In November 2010, Placentia-Linda Hospital was fined $25,000 by the California Department of Public Health for a patient error but stated that they would appeal the fine.

From 2009 to 2011, Yashwant Balgiri Giri, an anesthesiologist who worked at the hospital, sexually assaulted three female patients while they were under anesthesia. He was fined $50,000 and sentenced to six months in jail.

== See also ==
- List of hospitals in California
- Audrey Gregory
