= Nationwide Arena =

Arena in Columbus, Ohio, United States

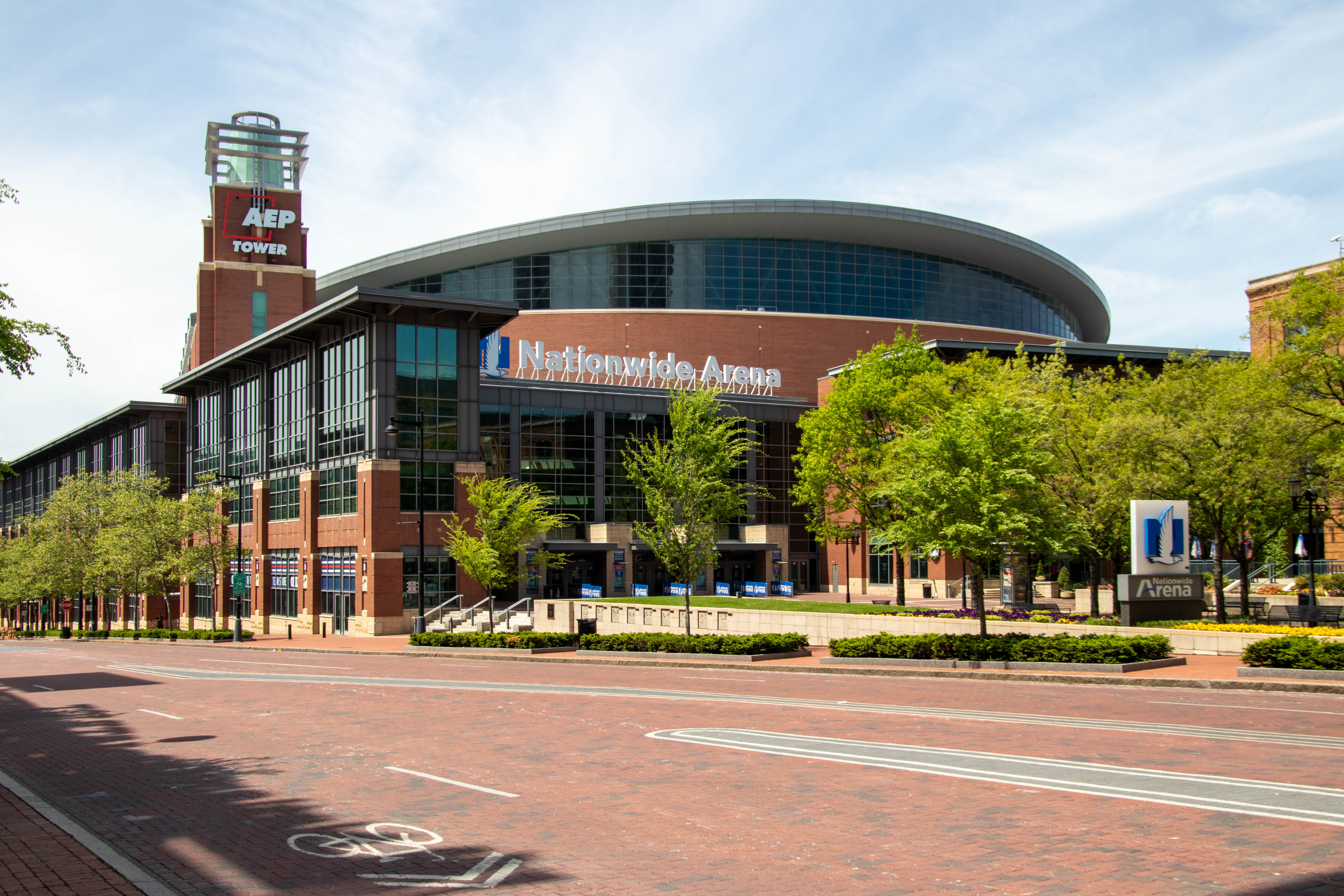
- Nationwide Arena in 2021
- Interactive map of Nationwide Arena
- Address: 200 West Nationwide Boulevard
- Location: Columbus, Ohio, U.S.
- Coordinates: 39°58′9.42″N 83°0′22.00″W
- Owner: Franklin County Convention Facilities Authority
- Operator: Columbus Arena Management
- Capacity: Basketball: 19,500; Concerts: 20,000; Ice hockey: 18,500 (19,500 with standing room)
- Public transit: 3, 6, 8, 9, 72, 74; CoGo

Construction
- Groundbreaking: May 26, 1998
- Opened: September 9, 2000
- Cost: $175 million ($346 million in 2025 dollars)
- Architects: Heinlein Schrock Stearns; NBBJ
- Project manager: Miles-McClellan
- Structural engineer: Thornton Tomasetti
- Services engineer: M-E Engineers
- General contractor: Turner Construction
- Main contractor: Barton Malow

Tenants
- Columbus Blue Jackets (NHL) (2000–present); Columbus Landsharks (NLL) (2001–2003); Columbus Destroyers (AFL) (2004–2008, 2019); Ohio Jr. Blue Jackets (USHL) (2006–2008); Columbus Fury (PVF/MLV) (2024–present)

Website
- nationwidearena.com

Nationwide Arena is a multi-purpose arena in the Arena District of Columbus, Ohio, United States. Since completion in 2000, the arena has served as the home of the Columbus Blue Jackets of the National Hockey League (NHL). It is one of two facilities in Columbus, along with the Greater Columbus Convention Center, that hosts events during the annual Arnold Classic, a sports and fitness event hosted by actor, bodybuilder, and former governor of California Arnold Schwarzenegger.

== History ==
Nationwide Arena was built near the site of the former Ohio Penitentiary, which had an eastern border of West Street. The arena itself is built over the prison's former parking lot. The arena's parking lot and an apartment complex are built where the prison formerly stood. The arena was constructed in 2000.

On March 16, 2002, 13-year-old Brittanie Cecil was struck in the head by a deflected puck during the Blue Jackets' game against the Calgary Flames at Nationwide Arena. She died two days later, becoming the only NHL fan to be killed in a game-related accident. As a result of her death, the NHL mandated safety netting in all its arenas.

In May 2012, Columbus Mayor Michael B. Coleman made a pitch to the National Basketball Association (NBA) requesting an expansion or relocated team be moved to Nationwide Arena.

In September 2026, Franklin County began planning for a $400 million renovation of Nationwide Arena including an expansion of the main entrance, an outdoor terrace and food hall, a new team store, and LED screens which would be completed by 2031–32.

== Ownership ==
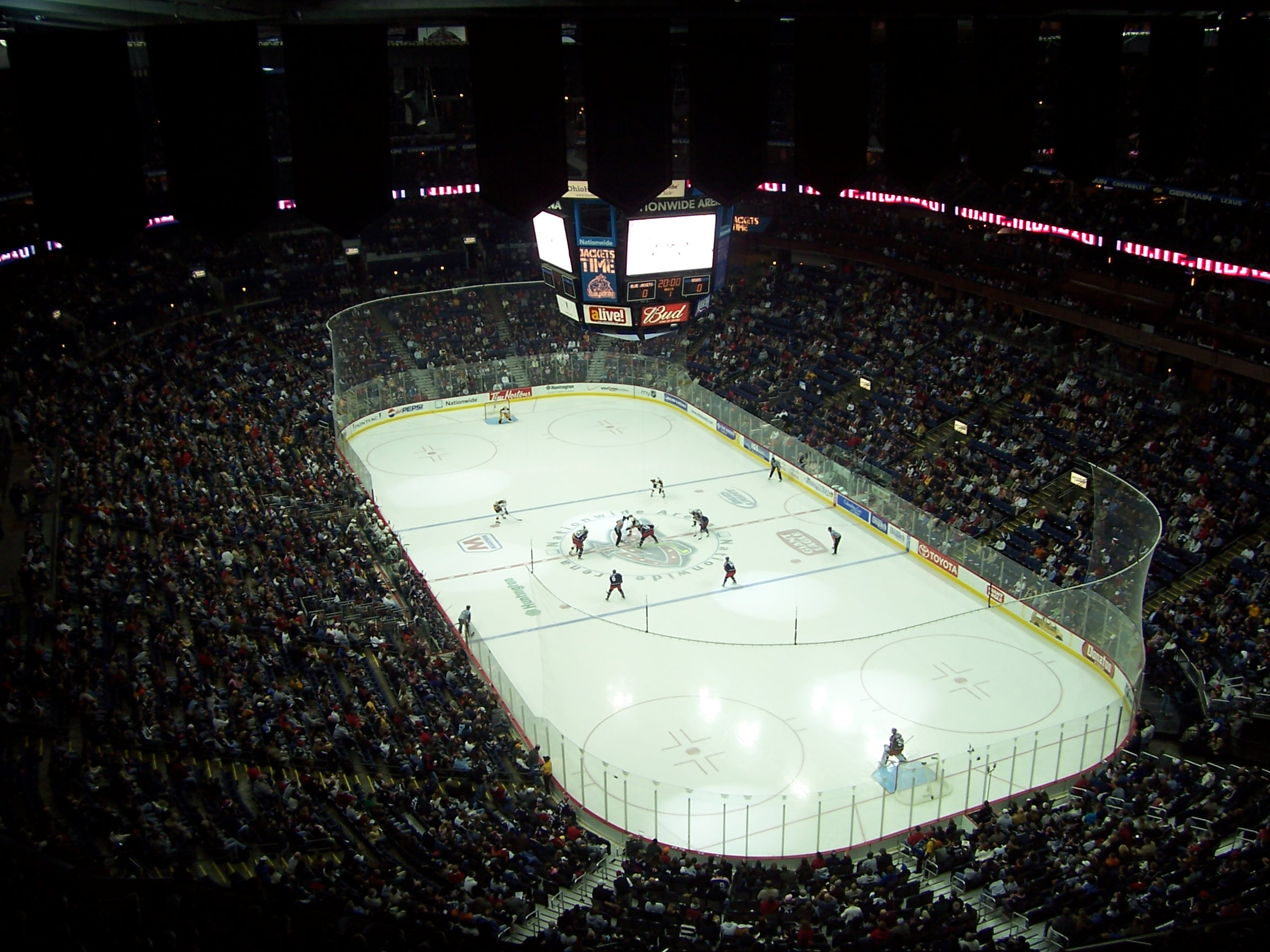
Arena bowl during a Blue Jackets game in 2007

The venue is named for the arena's original majority owner, Nationwide Mutual Insurance Company, whose world headquarters are located across the street. On March 30, 2012, arena owners Nationwide Insurance and the Dispatch Publishing Group sold the facility to the Franklin County Convention Facilities Authority (FCCFA). As part of the sale, Nationwide agreed to lend the FCCFA $43.3 million to finance the arena's purchase which will be paid back by 2039 with casino tax revenue collected by both the City of Columbus and Franklin County. In addition, the Ohio Department of Development agreed to a 10-year, $10 million loan to the FCCFA to assist with the facilities purchase. If the Blue Jackets meet annual roster payroll requirement, $500,000 of this loan per year will be forgiven. Nationwide Insurance will also pay the Blue Jackets $28 million to retain the arena's naming rights until 2022 as well as $58 million to purchase 30% ownership stake in the franchise. The Blue Jackets, in turn, agreed to remain in the city until 2039 or pay $36 million in damages.

== Management ==
While the Blue Jackets held sole operational control of the arena from 2000 to 2012, the team contracted day-to-day operations and event booking to venue management corporation SMG from the arena's opening until June 30, 2010. On May 12, 2010, the Blue Jackets announced that SMG would not be retained as arena managers and further announced that a one-year, annually renewable, management contract had been signed with Ohio State University. The contract called for the university to take over both day to day arena operations as well as booking non-athletic events, with the Blue Jackets booking athletic events and maintaining overall control of the arena. This arrangement made Nationwide Arena a sister venue to OSU's on-campus arena, Value City Arena. The university started booking acts in May 2010 and assumed day to day control of the arena on July 1, 2010. As part of the 2012 sale of Nationwide Arena, the Blue Jackets and OSU joined with Nationwide Insurance and the FCCFA to form Columbus Arena Management (CAM). Columbus Arena Management currently operates both Nationwide Arena and Value City Arena and oversees budgeting and event booking at both arenas.

== Design ==
The arena is of a brick design and serves as the center of an entertainment district located about one-half of a mile north of the Ohio Statehouse. Seating capacity is 18,500 for hockey, 19,500 for basketball, and 20,000 for concerts. The death of Brittanie Cecil from injuries sustained from a hockey puck flying into the stands at a Blue Jackets game on March 16, 2002, led to the installation of nylon netting to catch pucks that fly over the acrylic glass at all professional ice hockey arenas in the NHL, AHL, IIHF, and ECHL.

== Location ==
The area surrounding Nationwide Arena, called the Arena District, is a mixed-use neighborhood developed by Nationwide Realty Investors featuring restaurants, bars, offices and residential buildings. The Columbus Clippers, a Triple-A baseball team of the International League, play in Huntington Park, also located in the Arena District and developed by Nationwide Realty Investors. Columbus uses the arena as a drawing point for the city with the other establishments feeding off of the foot traffic. The KEMBA Live! concert venue adjacent to the Nationwide Arena property, and Lower.com Field completes the entertainment complex.

== Facilities ==
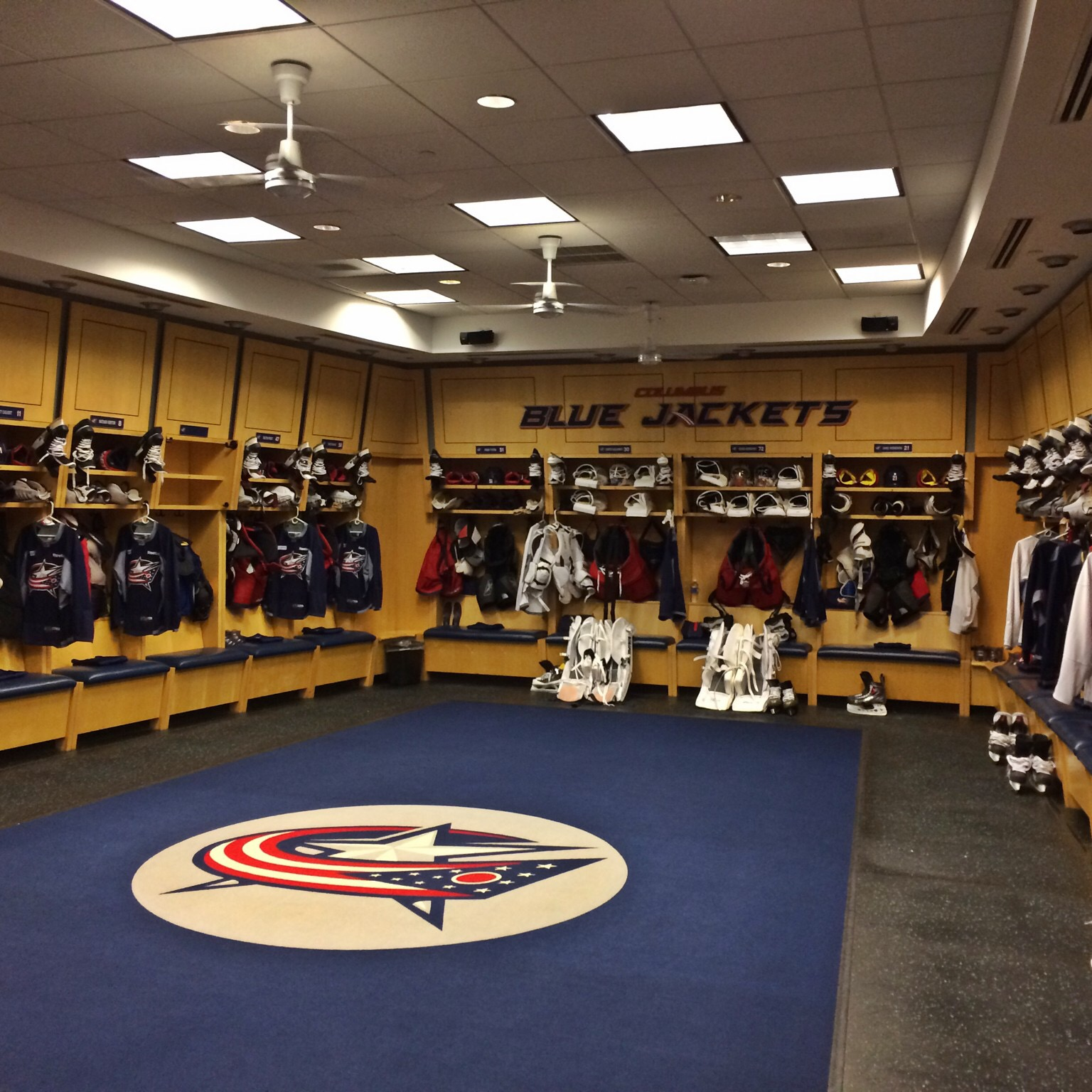
Blue Jackets dressing room

Nationwide Arena includes a smaller ice rink called the OhioHealth IceHaus, which serves as the practice rink for the Blue Jackets and is also used for youth hockey games and open skating times for the public. This facility made the Nationwide Arena the first NHL arena with an on-site practice facility and, as of 2019, one of only four such facilities in the NHL, along with KeyBank Center in Buffalo, New York, Prudential Center in Newark, New Jersey, and Little Caesars Arena in Detroit, Michigan.

== Events ==
=== Sports ===
- On October 7, 2000, the arena hosted the Columbus Blue Jackets' first game against the Chicago Blackhawks. Bruce Gardiner scored the franchise's first goal in the first period (which was also the first goal scored in the arena's history), but the Blackhawks won the game 5–3. Twenty days later, on October 27, 2000, the Blue Jackets picked up their first home win at the arena by defeating the Washington Capitals 3–1.
- The PBR's Built Ford Tough Series bull riding tour has held an event every year at Nationwide Arena from 2000 to 2012 (events prior to 2000 the event were held at the Ohio Expo Center Coliseum; there were no BFTS events in Columbus from 2013 to 2017 and in BFTS events since 2018 have been held at Value City Arena). It was the last event of the BFTS regular season (not counting the PBR World Finals) between 2000 and 2007.
- The arena hosted first and second-round games of the 2004, 2007, 2012, 2015 and 2019 NCAA Division I men's basketball tournaments.
- The arena hosted the 2007 NHL entry draft.
- On Tuesday, April 21, 2009, a record hockey crowd of 19,219 watched the Blue Jackets play their first postseason game at home, where they lost to the defending Stanley Cup Champion Detroit Red Wings by a final score of 4–1 in a Western Conference Quarterfinal game. They would eventually get their first postseason win at Nationwide Arena on April 23, 2014, against the Pittsburgh Penguins, by a final score of 4–3 in overtime.
- The arena hosted the 2015 National Hockey League All-Star Game, having previously been set for the 2013 edition that was cancelled due to the lockout.
- The arena hosted the second and third-round games of the 2012 NCAA Men's Division I Basketball Tournament.
- The arena hosted the Kellogg's Tour of Gymnastics Champions in 2016.
- The arena hosted the semi-finals and National Championship games of the 2018 NCAA Division I women's basketball tournament.
- The arena has hosted multiple pre-season Ohio State University Buckeyes men's basketball and pre- and post-season Buckeyes men's ice hockey games when Value City Arena has been unavailable for use.
- The arena also hosts the Ohio High School Athletic Association state championships for high school hockey.
- The Blue Jackets set an attendance record for a home game on April 19, 2018, when 19,395 attended Game 4 of the Eastern Conference First Round during the 2018 Stanley Cup playoffs.
- On March 11, 2020, the Blue Jackets announced that they would play all of their remaining home games in the 2019–20 season behind closed doors due to an executive order by Governor Mike DeWine that banned public gatherings of 1,000 people or more inside the state, which was enacted in order to combat the COVID-19 outbreak.
- The arena hosted all games of The Basketball Tournament 2020, a 24-team winner-take-all tournament with a $1 million prize, in July 2020.
- Monster Jam made a grand return to the arena on July 31 and August 1, 2021, for a one-off weekend.
- The arena hosted the 2021 NCAA Division I women's volleyball tournament in December 2021.
- The arena broke the attendance record again at 19,434 against the Boston Bruins on March 5, 2022.
- The arena hosted First and Second round games of the 2023 NCAA Division I men's basketball tournament. One notable game was when No. 16 seeded Fairleigh Dickinson defeated No. 1 seeded Purdue 63–58, to become only the second 16 seed to make it out of the Round of 64.
- The arena hosted the 2024 U.S. Figure Skating Championships in January 2024
- The arena hosted a PWHL Takeover Tour game on February 28, 2027 between the San Jose Sea Lions and the Detroit Clutch.

=== Mixed martial arts ===
- The arena has hosted many noteworthy MMA events including, Gracie Fighting Championships, International Fighting Championships, Caged Combat, UFC 68: The Uprising, UFC 82: Pride of a Champion, UFC 96: Jackson vs. Jardine, UFC on ESPN: Blaydes vs. Daukaus, WEC 47, Strikeforce: Feijao vs. Henderson, and Strikeforce: Tate vs. Rousey.

UFC 68 produced a number of attendance records for a mixed martial arts event. It was the first MMA event outside Japan to have at least 15,000 people in attendance. This record has since been outdone on a number of occasions, with the current holder being UFC 193 which had 56,214 people in attendance.

=== Professional wrestling ===
- On June 23, 2002, the arena hosted the WWE pay-per-view King of the Ring.
- On June 13, 2004, the arena hosted the WWE pay-per-view Bad Blood.
- On June 14, 2015, the arena hosted the WWE pay-per-view Money in the Bank.
- On March 11, 2018, the arena hosted the WWE pay-per-view Fastlane.
- On September 26, 2021, the arena hosted the WWE pay-per-view Extreme Rules.

=== Other events ===
- Britney Spears opened her 'Dream Within A Dream Tour' on November 1st, 2001.
- Destiny's Child performed at the venue for their last tour 'Destiny Fulfilled... and Lovin' It' on August 13, 2005.
- The 2007 National Catholic Youth Conference
- The 2011 North American Youth Congress
- Jeff Dunham on Controlled Chaos Tour, December 24, 2011
- Barack Obama held a campaign rally on November 5, 2012, with Bruce Springsteen and Jay-Z.
- From March 29, 2016, to April 3, 2016, the arena hosted a $1,000,000 international Counter-Strike: Global Offensive tournament, MLG Major Championship: Columbus.
- Impractical Jokers Santiago Sent Us Tour February 3, 2018
- Olivia Rodrigo performed at the arena for her Guts World Tour on March 22, 2024.
- Melanie Martinez performed at the arena for her The Trilogy Tour on June 13, 2024.
- Weezer performed all of the Blue Album on their Voyage to the Blue Planet Tour on September 7, 2024
- Sabrina Carpenter performed the opening night of her Short 'n Sweet Tour on September 23, 2024.
- Twenty One Pilots performed three sold out hometown shows as part of The Clancy Tour on October 4–6, 2024. The shows were filmed for a future live album.
- Deftones performed during the first leg of their 2025 North American Tour on March 29, 2025.

== Reception ==
ESPN The Magazine declared it "the No. 2 stadium experience in professional sports." The Ultimate Sports Road Trip rated it the best arena in the NHL saying "This newer arena in downtown Columbus is the anchor for the emerging Arena District, already burgeoning with shops, restaurants and hotels. The venue is spectacular, from its nostalgic brick and stone veneer to its sweeping concourses with blue mood lighting and modern amenities. The arena bowl has state of the art scoreboards and surround LED graphics boards which look 21st century high tech. With a separate practice rink built right in the facility, theme restaurants and great food selection, not to mention a raucous hockey atmosphere, this NHL venue is a must see!"

== See also ==
- List of indoor arenas by capacity
- List of indoor arenas in the United States

Preceded by first arena	Home of the Columbus Blue Jackets; 2000–present	Succeeded by current
Preceded by Scotiabank Place	Host of the NHL All-Star Game; 2015	Succeeded by Bridgestone Arena
Preceded by American Airlines Center	NCAA Women's Division I Basketball Tournament; Finals Venue; 2018	Succeeded by Amalie Arena
