= Matt Maher =

Canadian musician (born 1974)

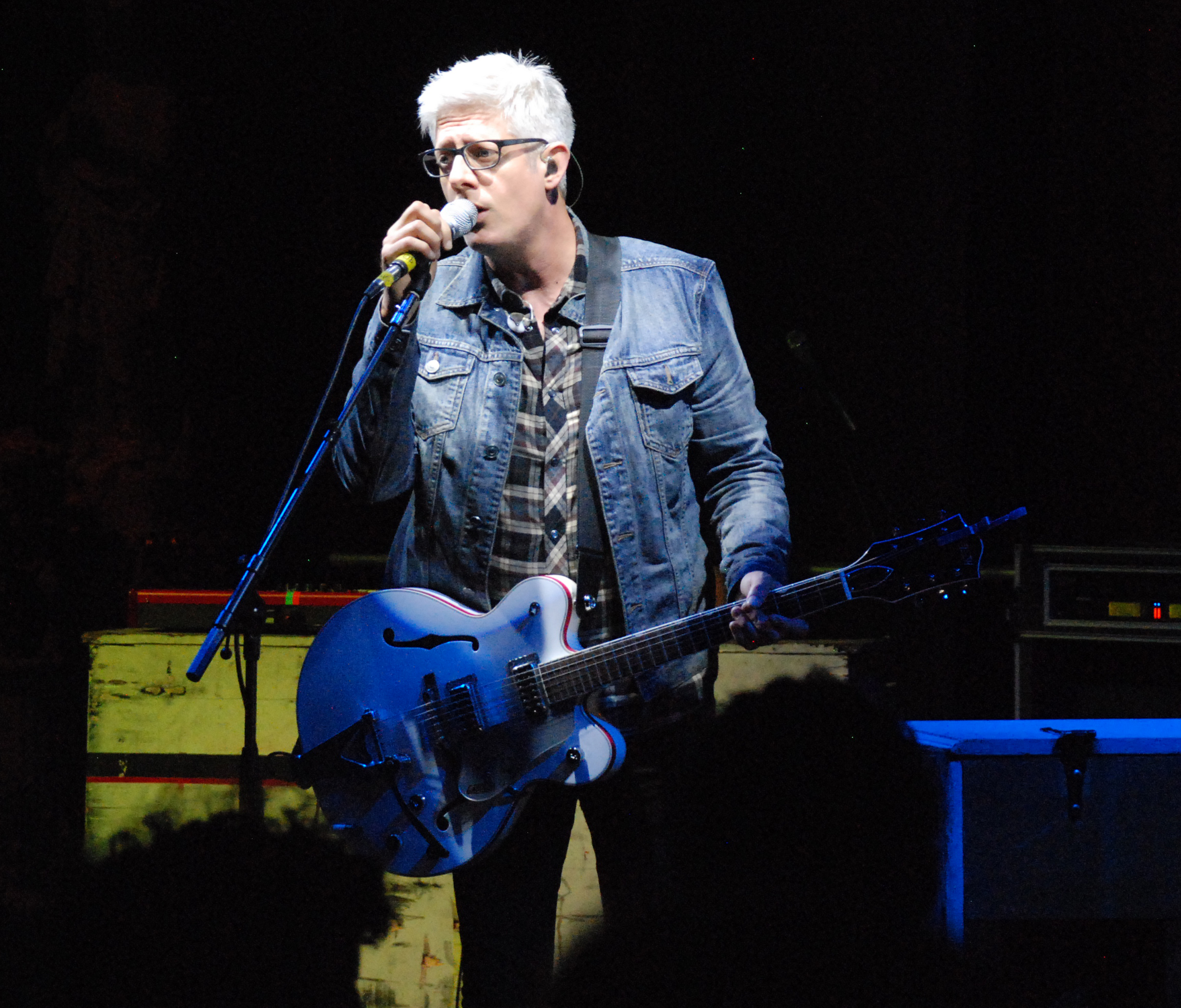
- Maher performing in 2015

Background information
- Born: Matthew Guion Maher; November 10, 1974 (age 52); Newfoundland, Canada
- Genres: Contemporary worship music, contemporary Christian music
- Instruments: Vocals, piano, guitar
- Years active: 2000–present
- Label: Essential
- Spouse: Kristin Fisher (m. 2010)
- Website: www.mattmahermusic.com

Matthew Guion Maher (born November 10, 1974) is a Canadian Catholic contemporary Christian music artist, songwriter, and worship leader based in the United States. Three of his nine albums have reached the Top 25 Christian Albums Billboard chart and four of his singles have reached the Top 25 Christian Songs chart. His notable writing credits include "Your Grace Is Enough", "I Will Rise", "Because He Lives (Amen)", "Christ Is Risen", and "Lord I Need You". Maher has been nominated for nine Grammy Awards in his career and was awarded the Songwriter of the Year at the 2015 GMA Dove Awards.

== Early life ==
Maher was born and raised in Newfoundland, Canada. His parents recognized his musical talent, and he grew up taking piano lessons and immersing himself in a broad variety of music and playing in concert and jazz ensembles, singing in a choir, and playing in a garage rock band.

Maher started his post-secondary studies at Memorial University of Newfoundland and continued his studies in the Jazz Department at Arizona State University. He studied jazz piano and earned a music degree there. He paid for his first three years of college by playing piano in a hotel.

== Career ==
His first label was the Spirit and Song, a division of OCP Publications, where he released his first three collections. Early in 2007 Maher signed to Essential Records. He released his first big-label album (and his fourth album overall) Empty and Beautiful on April 8, 2008. His second album with Essential Records (and his fifth album overall), Alive Again, was released on September 22, 2009. In late 2009, Maher toured with Michael W. Smith, Meredith Andrews and Phil Stacey on the "New Hallelujah Tour". Alive Again peaked at No. 6 on Billboard magazine's Top Christian Albums chart in 2009.

When Pope Benedict XVI visited the United States in April 2008, Maher was asked to lead worship for crowds of thousands at the Rally for Youth and Seminarians in Yonkers, New York, which also featured Kelly Clarkson, tobyMac and Third Day, among other musicians. He was subsequently interviewed on Fox News, where he played his title track from Empty and Beautiful.

Maher was a guest singer songwriter speaker at Crowder's Fantastical Church Music Conference at Baylor University in late 2010 put on by the David Crowder Band. In early 2011 he toured the United States on the Rock And Worship Roadshow headlined by MercyMe.

Maher played "Lord, I Need You" before a crowd of nearly four million, including Pope Francis, during Eucharistic adoration at World Youth Day 2013 in Rio, Brazil. Other youth activities he has participated in include the 2013, 2015, and 2017 National Catholic Youth Conferences, all held in Indianapolis, Indiana. He also sang at the 2014 March for Life.

On March 17, 2015, Maher released his eighth studio album, Saints and Sinners, through Essential Records. "Because He Lives (Amen)" was the first single release off of the album, and additional tracks on the album include songwriting collaborations with Needtobreathe members Bo and Bear Rinehart, Jon Foreman of Switchfoot. In September 2017, Maher's ninth studio album, Echoes, released and earned Maher his ninth career Grammy Award nomination.

He is a two-time BMI Songwriter of the Year and in 2015 was named NSAI Songwriter of the Year. Along with his nine Grammy Award nominations, he has also been nominated for more than 20 GMA/Gospel Music Association Dove Awards in his career, including "Song of the Year", "Worship Song of the Year", "Pop Contemporary Christian Performance of the Year", and "Pop Contemporary Song of the Year".

On October 12, 2018, his song "Lord, I Need You" was certified Platinum by RIAA, his first certification.

His single "Alive and Breathing" reached top-5 in the Christian singles chart, in June 2020 the song started to chart on mainstream lists as well, hitting No. 3 on Rolling Stone's trending 25 list as well as No. 25 on Billboard singles of the week.

Maher is featured in three Christmas special theatrical releases for Dallas Jenkins's The Chosen franchise. In 2020's Christmas with The Chosen: The Shepherd, Maher performed "Hope For Everyone". In 2021's Christmas with The Chosen: The Messengers, Maher sang his Celtic-themed version of "Hark! The Herald Angels Sing". The video of Maher's "Hark..." was reprised for the 2023 special "Christmas with The Chosen: Holy Night", released on December 12, 2023.

== Personal life ==
Maher is a practicing Catholic. He and his wife, Kristin Fisher, live in Nashville, Tennessee with their three children: a daughter and two sons.

== Discography ==
=== Albums ===
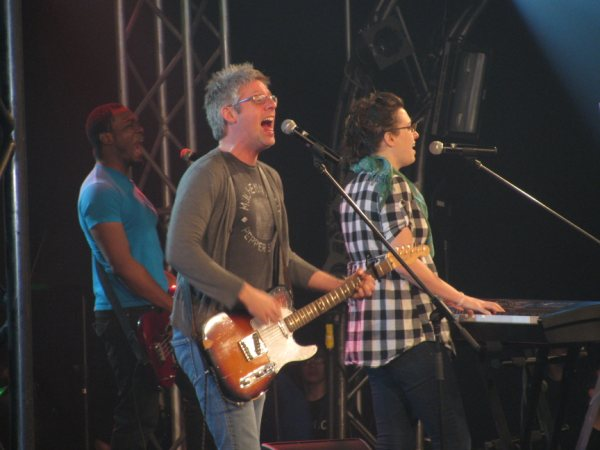
Maher performing at YC Newfoundland in 2009

Title	Year	Album details	Peak chart positions		
Title	Year	Album details	US	US Christian	US Holiday
The End and the Beginning	2001	Released: January 1, 2001; Label: Spirit and Song; Format: CD, digital download	—	—	—
Welcome to Life	2003	Released: January 1, 2003; Label: Spirit and Song; Format: CD, digital download	—	—	—
Overflow	2006	Released: March 22, 2006; Label: Spirit and Song; Format: CD, digital download	—	—	—
Empty & Beautiful	2008	Released: April 8, 2008; Label: Essential; Format: CD, digital download	168	12	—
Alive Again	2009	Released: September 22, 2009; Label: Essential; Format: CD, digital download	128	6	—
The Love in Between	2011	Released: September 20, 2011; Label: Essential; Format: CD, digital download	97	7	—
All the People Said Amen	2013	Released: April 23, 2013; Label: Essential; Format: CD, digital download	88	5	—
Saints and Sinners	2015	Released: March 17, 2015; Label: Essential; Format: CD, digital download	52	2	—
Echoes	2017	Released: September 29, 2017; Label: Essential/Sony; Format: CD, digital download	—	5	—
The Advent of Christmas	2018	Released: October 19, 2018; Label: Essence Records; Format: CD	—	27	12
Alive & Breathing	2020	Released: February 21, 2020	—	4	—
The Stories I Tell Myself	2022	Released: October 21, 2022	—	—	—

=== Extended plays ===
Title	Year	EP details
Lord, I Need You	2015	Released: September 23, 2015; Label: Provident
Alive & Breathing Vol. I	2019	Released: September 13, 2019
Alive & Breathing Vol. II	2019	Released: October 11, 2019
Alive & Breathing Vol. 3	2019	Released: November 8, 2019
Alive & Breathing Vol. 4	2020	Released: January 17, 2020

=== Singles ===
Year	Title	Peak chart positions				Certifications	Album
Year	Title	US Christ.	US Christ. Airplay	US Christ. AC	US Rock	Certifications	Album
2008	"Your Grace Is Enough" (Chris Tomlin cover)	4		2	—		Empty & Beautiful
2009	"Empty & Beautiful"	47		—	—		Empty & Beautiful
2009	"Alive Again"	12		10	—		Alive Again
2010	"Hold Us Together"	6		8	—	RIAA: Gold	Alive Again
2010	"Christ Is Risen"	18		21	—		Alive Again
2011	"Turn Around"	5		6	—		The Love in Between
2011	"Hark! The Herald Angels Sing"	23		7	—		non-album single
2012	"Rise Up"	23		18	—		The Love in Between
2013	"Lord, I Need You"	4		4	—	RIAA: 2× Platinum	All the People Said Amen
2014	"All the People Said Amen"	6	4	7	—	RIAA: Gold	All the People Said Amen
2014	"Hope Can Change Everything" (with Francesca Battistelli, Jeremy Camp, Jamie Grace, Bart Millard, and Sidewalk Prophets)	14	21	—	—		non-album single
2014	"Because He Lives (Amen)"	3	1	1	—	RIAA: Gold	Saints and Sinners
2015	"Deliverer"	18	18	15	—		Saints and Sinners
2016	"Abide with Me"	—	34	22	—		Saints and Sinners
2016	"Glory (Let There Be Peace)"	14	1	1	—		non-album single
2017	"Your Love Defends Me"	12	8	3	—		Echoes
2017	"What a Friend"	10	2	3	—		Echoes
2018	"Born On That Day"	24	10	6	—		The Advent of Christmas
2018	"Jingle Bells"	48	34	21	—		The Advent of Christmas
2019	"Alive & Breathing" (featuring Ellie Limebear)	5	1	1	—		Alive & Breathing
2020	"Run to the Father"	20	18	16	—		Alive & Breathing
2021	"Joyful Noise"	—	27	26	—		Alive & Breathing
2022	"Leaning" (featuring Lizzie Morgan)	38	24	22	—		The Stories I Tell Myself
2022	"The Stories I Tell Myself"	—	—	—	—		The Stories I Tell Myself
2023	"The Lord's Prayer (It's Yours)"	9	1	1	—		The Stories I Tell Myself
2023	"Take It Easy" (with The Porter's Gate and Paul Zach)	—	—	—	—		Non-album singles
2023	"In the Room" (with Essential Worship featuring Mia Fieldes and Chris Brown)	—	—	—	—		Non-album singles
2023	"Christ Is Closer Still" (with The Porter's Gate and Doe)	—	—	—	—		Non-album singles
2023	"Go Tell It (Gloria)" (with The Choir Room)	—	—	—	—		Non-album singles
2024	"Give Thanks to God" (with We Are Messengers)	—	—	—	—		Non-album singles
2025	"Wait"	—	—	—	—		Non-album singles
2025	"Praise the Giver"	—	—	—	—		Non-album singles
2025	"Who Jesus Is" (with Alpha USA Music)	—	—	—	—		Non-album singles
2025	"Cling to the Cross" (with Seph Schlueter)	50	—	—	—		Non-album singles
2025	"Taste and See (The Love of Christ)"	—	—	—	—		Non-album singles
2025	"Gonna Be Alright"	9	1	1	44		Non-album singles

=== Other charted songs ===
Year	Title	Peak chart positions			Album
Year	Title	US Christ.	US Christ. Air	US Christ. AC	Album
2025	"Our King Has Come" (with Katy Nichole)	32	14	10	The Hope of Christmas EP

== Awards and recognition ==
Grammy Awards

- 2017 - nomination for the 60th Annual GRAMMY Awards for Best Contemporary Christian album, ECHOES
- 2015 - four nominations for the 58th Annual GRAMMY Awards
  - Best Contemporary Christian Music Album, Saints And Sinners
  - Best Contemporary Christian Music Performance/Song, "Because He Lives (Amen)" from Saints And Sinners
  - Best Contemporary Christian Music Performance/Song, as co-writer for "Soul On Fire" by Third Day
  - Best Contemporary Christian Music Performance/Song, as co-writer "Come As You Are" by Crowder
- 2014 - two nominations for the 57th Annual GRAMMY Awards
  - Best Contemporary Christian Music Album, All The People Said Amen
  - Best Contemporary Christian Music Performance/Song, "Lord, I Need You" from All The People Said Amen
- 2013 - nomination for the 56th Annual GRAMMY Awards for Best Contemporary Christian Music Performance/Song for "White Flag" from 2012 Passion compilation
- 2012 - nomination for 55th Annual GRAMMY Awards for Best Contemporary Christian Music Performance/Song as co-writer for "I Lift My Hands" by Chris Tomlin

GMA Canada Covenant Awards

- 2008 Praise And Worship Album of the Year: Empty & Beautiful
- 2009 nominee, Male Vocalist of the Year
- 2009 nominee, Song of the Year: "As It Is In Heaven"
- 2009 nominee, Praise and Worship Song of the Year: "As It Is In Heaven"
- 2010 Album of the Year: Alive Again
- 2010 Praise And Worship Album of the Year: Alive Again
- 2010 Song of the Year: "Hold Us Together"
- 2010 Praise And Worship Song of the Year: "Alive Again"
- 2011 Male Vocalist of the Year
- 2012 Pop/Contemporary Album of the Year: "The Love In Between"

GMA Dove Awards

- 2010 nominee, Praise And Worship Song of the Year: Alive Again
- 2010 nominee, Song of the Year: "Alive Again"
- 2010 winner, Special Events Album of the Year: Glory Revealed II: The Word of God in Worship (Split win with Kari Jobe)
- 2015 winner, Songwriter of the Year
- 2019 winner, Christmas/Special Event Album of the Year: The Advent of Christmas

Unity Awards

- 2003 winner, Best New Artist of the Year
- 2004 winner, Praise & Worship Song of the Year: "I Love You, Lord"
- 2008 winner, Best Artist of the Year

Other

- 2008 Catholic Album of the Year: Empty & Beautiful
