= Saints and Sinners (Matt Maher album) =

Studio album by Matt Maher
- Released: March 17, 2015
- Studios: Blackbird Studios and The Smoakstack (Nashville, Tennessee); Ed's (Franklin, Tennessee)
- Genres: Contemporary worship music, contemporary Christian music
- Length: 42:23
- Label: Essential
- Producers: Paul Moak; Matt Maher (co-producer); Ed Cash; Jason Ingram

Matt Maher chronology
All the People Said Amen (2013)	Saints and Sinners (2015)	Echoes (2017)

Saints and Sinners is the fourth studio album from Matt Maher. Essential Records released the project on March 17, 2015.

== Critical reception ==
Professional ratings
Review scores
Source	Rating
CCM Magazine	4/5 stars
Christian Music Review	4.3/5
Cross Rhythms	9/10 squares
Jesus Freak Hideout	4/5 stars
Jesus Wired	9/10 stars
Louder Than the Music	3.5/5 stars
New Release Tuesday	5/5 stars
The Sound Opinion	5/5 stars
Worship Leader	4.5/5 stars

Designating the album a four star release at CCM Magazine, Andy Argyrakis depicts, "Maher gives listeners yet another collection split between personal and worshipful morsels." Mark D. Geil, mentioning in a four star review from Jesus Freak Hideout, responds, "Saints and Sinners finds him in his stride, and adding a unique concept that is, for the most part, quite well executed." Specifying in a four and a half star review by Worship Leader, Jeremy Armstrong responds, "the result is a litany of gutsy, profound, and beautiful worship songs" that "cements Maher’s already-stalwart position as one of today’s most important worship songwriters." Tony Cummings, giving the album a nine out of ten rating for Cross Rhythms, writes, "this album is a work of inspiring craftsmanship." Former CCM Magazine editor, Lindsay Williams, rating the album five out of five stars for The Sound Opinion, recognizes, "Saints & Sinners positions Maher as more than a songwriter content to sit in someone else’s shadow... He's found his unique artistic voice, and this album proves he's not afraid to use it." Indicating in a review by BREATHEcast, Jeannie Law realizes, "Overall it's evident that Maher really put his heart and soul into the making of the entire record." Kevin Davis, signaling in a five star review by New Release Tuesday, describes, "This album provides listeners with eleven tracks of vertical offerings to God that you can sing in any circumstance, and this is my album of the year." Awarding the album three and a half stars for Louder Than the Music, Philip Aldis writes, "there are more gourmet moments than sprouts left on the side, and the centre-pieces are enhanced by intimate production at just the right moments." Rating the album a 4.3 out of five from Christian Music Review, Laura Chambers says, "Saints and Sinners pulls us off the beaten path for a humility lesson, before turning us loose again to use our newly opened eyes to change hearts and the world." Rebekah Joy, awarding the album nine out of ten stars for Jesus Wired, writes, "Saints and Sinners is a great album."

== Accolades ==
This album was No. 6, on the Worship Leader's Top 20 Albums of 2015 list.

The song, "Because He Lives (Amen)", was No. 1, on the Worship Leader's Top 20 Songs of 2015 list.

== Track listing ==
Standard edition
No.	Title	Writer(s)	Length
1.	"A Future Not My Own"	Jason Ingram, Matt Maher, Paul Moak	3:18
2.	"Deliverer"	Maher, Bear Rinehart, Bo Rinehart	3:25
3.	"Glory Bound"	Hank Bentley, Maher, Christoper Stevens	2:56
4.	"Land of My Father"	Luke Hellenbronth, Leslie Jordan, David Leonard, Maher, Moak	3:32
5.	"Everything Is Grace"	Mia Fieldes, Ingram, Maher	4:00
6.	"Sons and Daughters"	Ingram, Maher, Ike Ndolo	5:19
7.	"Firelight"	Bentley, Fieldes, Maher	4:14
8.	"Instrument"	Jon Foreman, Maher	4:22
9.	"Abide with Me"	Crowder, Ingram, Maher, Matt Redman	3:17
10.	"Because He Lives (Amen)"	Daniel Carson, Ed Cash, Bill Gaither, Gloria Gaither, Ingram, Maher	3:20
11.	"Rest"	Thad Cockrell, Maher	4:40
Total length:			42:23

Deluxe edition
No.	Title	Length
1.	"The Field of Stars"	0:54
2.	"A Future Not My Own"	3:06
3.	"Deliverer"	3:25
4.	"Glory Bound"	2:56
5.	"Land of My Father"	3:32
6.	"Everything Is Grace"	3:54
7.	"The Invocation"	1:26
8.	"Sons and Daughters"	5:19
9.	"Firelight"	4:14
10.	"Instrument"	4:22
11.	"Abide with Me"	3:10
12.	"The Waiting"	1:28
13.	"Because He Lives (Amen)"	3:19
14.	"Rest"	4:40
15.	"Borrowed Time"	3:38
16.	"Because of You"	4:26
17.	"Garden (Live)"	5:09
18.	"Because He Lives (Amen) (Unplugged)"	3:23
Total length:		62:21

== Personnel ==
- Matt Maher – vocals, acoustic piano, synthesizers, programming, acoustic guitar
- Jason Ingram – programming
- Jonathan Smith – programming
- Tim Lauer – acoustic piano, synthesizers, Hammond B3 organ, programming
- Paul Moak – acoustic piano, synthesizers, acoustic guitar, electric guitar, pedal steel guitar, percussion, backing vocals
- Jacob Sooter – keyboards
- Ed Cash – programming, acoustic guitar, backing vocals
- Hank Bentley – electric guitar
- Kris Donegan – acoustic guitar, electric guitar, slide guitar
- Gabe Scott – acoustic guitar
- Matt Pierson – bass
- Matthew Melton – bass
- Paul Mabury – drums
- Richard Scott – drums, percussion
- Callie Cryer – backing vocals
- Phoebe Cryer – backing vocals
- Morgan Harper-Nichols – backing vocals
- Leslie Jordan – vocals (4)
- David Leonard – vocals (4)
- Jon Foreman – vocals (8)

Choir

- Blaine Barcus, Brenton Brown, Kat Davis, Janice Gaines, Katie Haskell, Nicole Koester, Matt Maher, Paul Moak, Jake Neumar, Calvin Nowell, Diane Sheets, Keithon Stribling, Jill Tomalty, Nina Williams and Luke Woodard

== Production ==
- Blaine Barcus – A&R
- Jason Root – A&R
- Matt Maher – producer
- Jason Ingram – producer
- Paul Moak – producer, engineer
- Ed Cash – producer
- Buckley Miller – engineer
- Devin Vaughan – engineer
- Stephen Leiweke – engineer
- Ernesto Olvera-Lapier – assistant engineer
- Brendan St Gelais – assistant engineer
- Zack Zinck – assistant engineer
- Sean Moffitt – mixing
- Warren David – mix assistant
- Tom Coyne – mastering at Sterling Sound (New York City, New York)
- Beth Lee – art direction
- Tim Parker – art direction, design
- Amy Dickerson – photography

== Charts ==
In its first week of release, the album sold 8,000 copies in the U.S.

Chart (2015)	Peak position
US Billboard 200	52
US Top Christian Albums (Billboard)	2
