= Placentia, California =

City in California, United States

- City
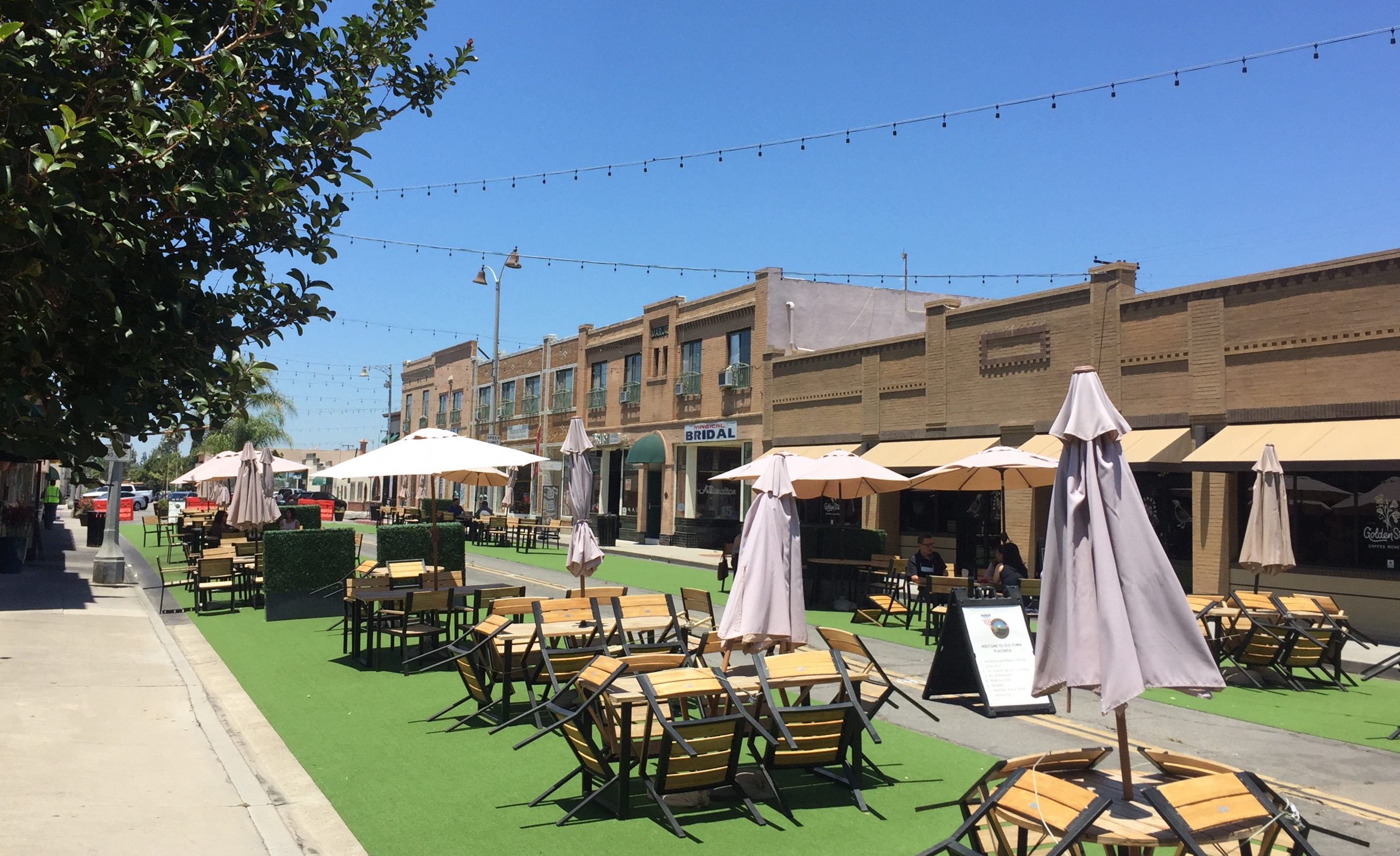
- Placita Santa Fe in Old Town Placentia (2021)

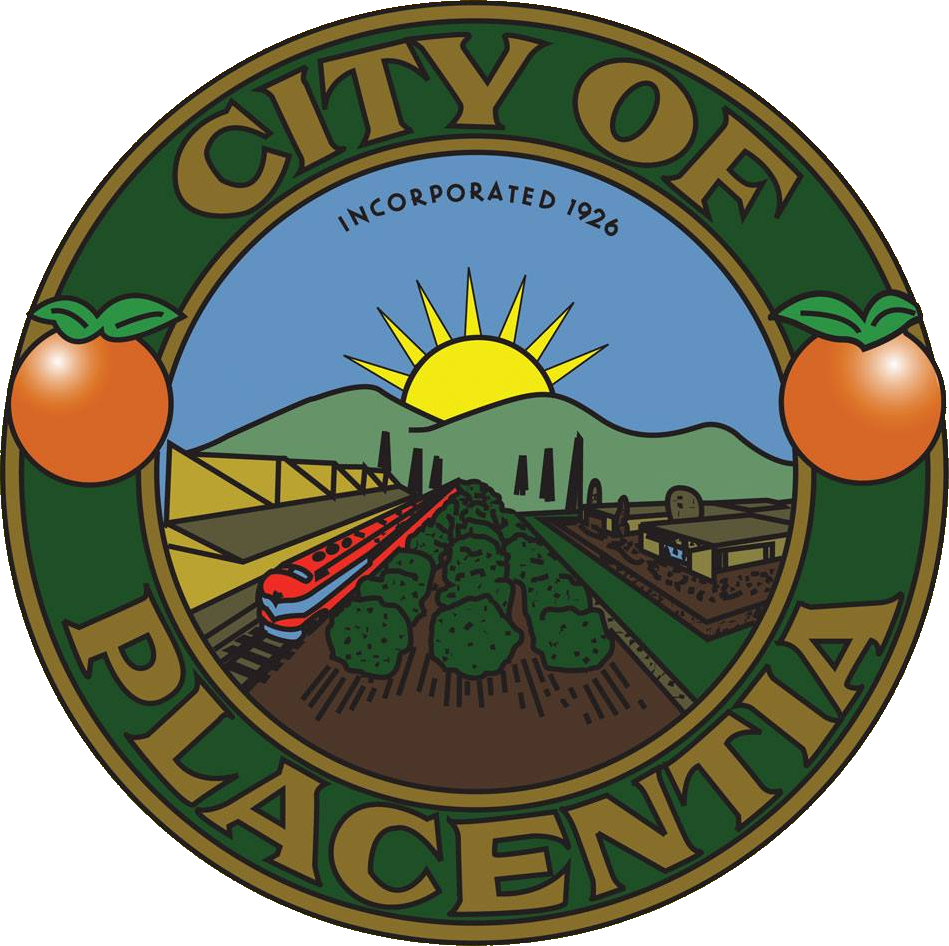
- Flag Seal
- Motto: "A pleasant place to live."
- Interactive map of Placentia, California
- Location in the United States
- Coordinates: 33°52′57″N 117°51′18″W
- Country: United States
- State: California
- County: Orange
- Incorporated: December 2, 1926

Government
  - Type: Council-Administrator
  - Mayor: Chad Wanke
  - Mayor Pro Tem: Jeremy B. Yamaguchi
  - City council: Ward Smith; Tom Hummer; Kevin Kirwin
  - Treasurer: Kevin Larson
  - Acting City Administrator: Rosanna Ramirez

Area
  - Total: 6.63 sq mi (17.16 km^{2})
  - Land: 6.61 sq mi (17.12 km^{2})
  - Water: 0.015 sq mi (0.04 km^{2}) 0.22%
- Elevation: 272 ft (83 m)

Population (2020)
  - Total: 51,824
  - Density: 7,840/sq mi (3,027.1/km^{2})
- Time zone: UTC-8 (Pacific)
  - Summer (DST): UTC-7 (PDT)
- ZIP codes: 92870–92871
- Area code: 714
- FIPS code: 06-57526
- GNIS feature IDs: 1661237, 2411432
- Website: www.placentia.org

Placentia (/pləˈsɛnʃə/ plə-SEN-shə) is a city in Orange County, California, United States. It is part of the Los Angeles metropolitan area. Placentia's population was 51,233 at the 2020 US census. The city is primarily referred to as a bedroom community.

In 1971, Placentia was honored with the All-America City Award: given out annually by the National Civic League to 10 cities in the United States.

== History ==
Indigenous peoples of California referred to by the Spanish as Gabrielenos, known as the Tongva, lived in the area for thousands of years. One estimate wrote that the native population in what was to become northern Orange County was at least 1,000. The large village of Hutuknga was closely situated to the area that is now Placentia.

In 1837, the Mexican government granted the area that is now Placentia to Juan Pacifico Ontiveros as part of the Rancho San Juan Cajón de Santa Ana land grant.

In 1865, American pioneer Daniel Kraemer arrived and purchased 3,900 acres (1,600 ha). Many other American pioneers soon followed, and the community developed.

The local school district was originally named the Cajon School District. In 1878, the school district's name was changed to Placentia School District by Sarah Jane McFadden, Placentia being derived from a Latin word meaning "pleasant place to live". She was the wife of William McFadden, who was the second White settler to arrive in Placentia. The town eventually took its own name after the school district.

The first commercial orange grove was established in 1880, worked by mostly Mexican and English laborers.

=== 20th century ===
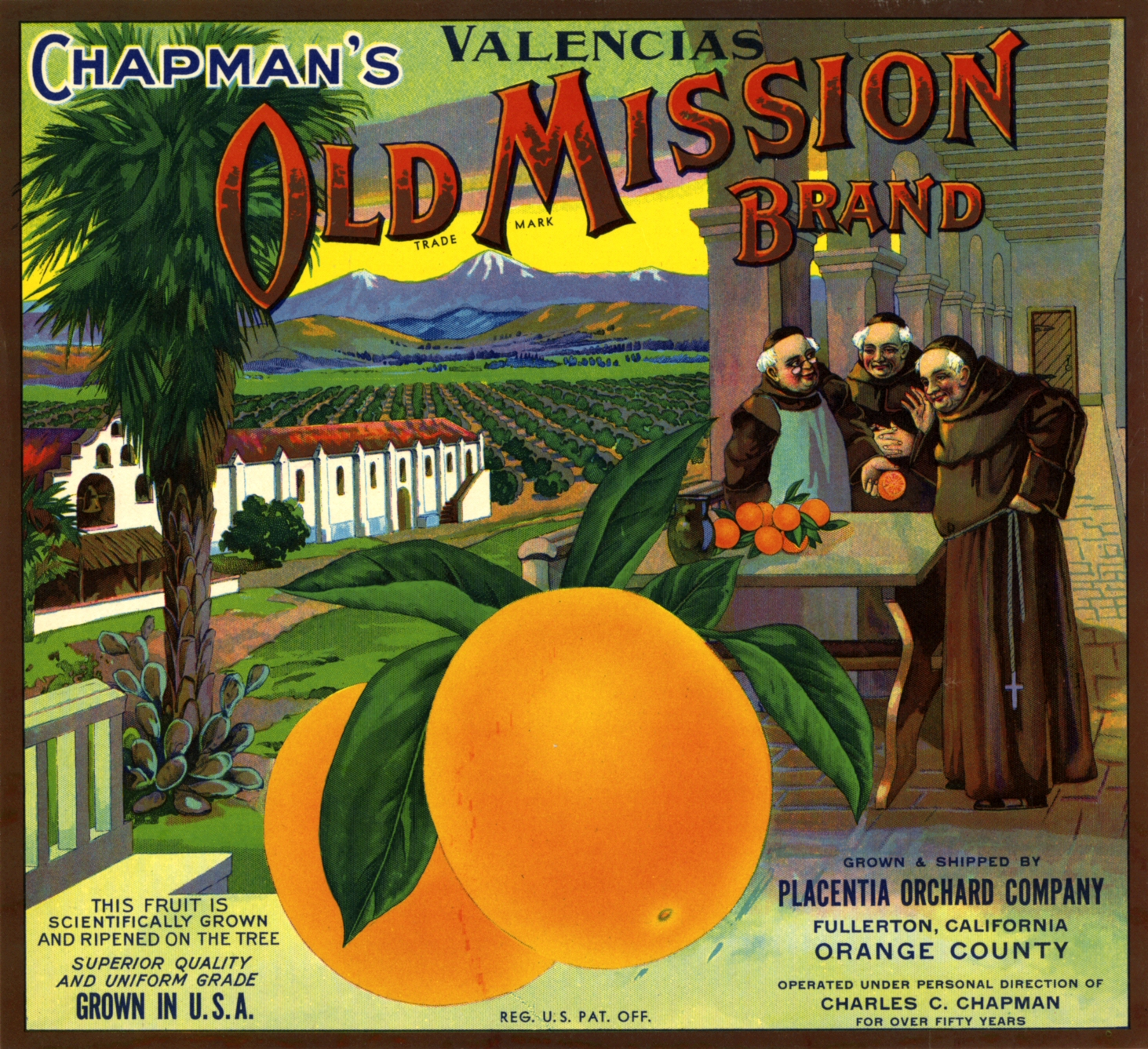
Orange crate label of the Placentia Orchard Company

From a handful of scattered ranches, the core of the town was developed circa 1910. It functioned as a major railroad stop along the Santa Fe Railroad for processing oranges. Later, during the Great Depression, a brief strike of citrus workers took place in Placentia.

Oil was discovered in 1919, which led to the development of numerous oil wells in eastern and northern Placentia. The town of Richfield, which later became Atwood, was built to house oil workers. Mexican laborers formed the majority of the labor force in the oil industry. The neighboring town of La Jolla, Placentia was constructed for a similar reason as a segregated colonia.

Several schools were constructed in Placentia from the 1910s to the 1930s that were segregated between White and Mexican students. Isabel Martínez was the first student of Mexican parentage to graduate from Fullerton High School in 1931, being celebrated in the Placentia Courier as an "exceptional" Mexican. Within six years, the number of Placentia students graduating high school numbered only six.

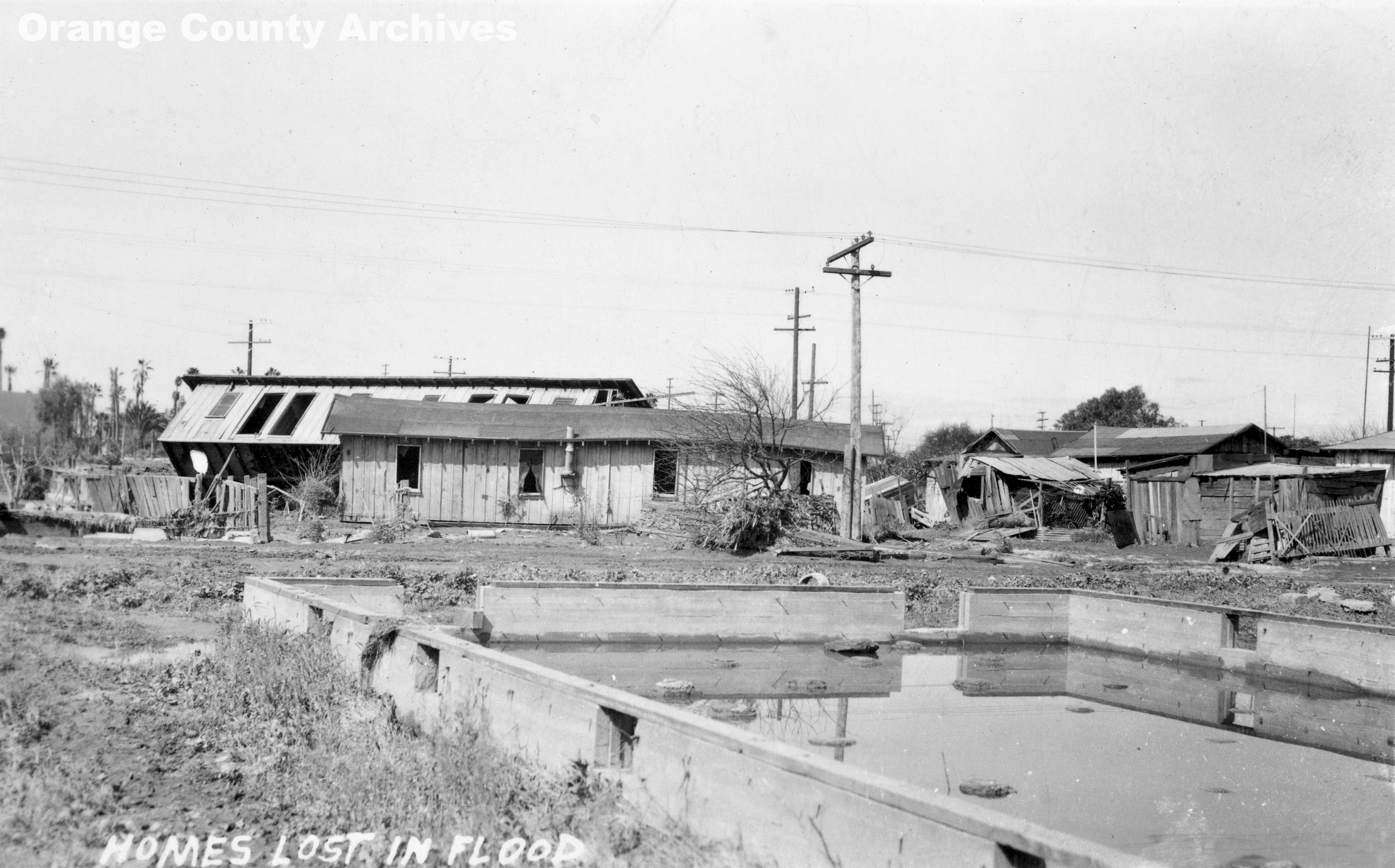
La Jolla, Placentia, a predominantly Mexican colonia, after the Santa Ana River flood of 1938

The predominantly Mexican areas of Placentia were severely hit by the Santa Ana River flood of 1938, which destroyed everything in the area but "the La Jolla School Building and three brick structures." The flood left 3,700 refugees and 1,500 homes uninhabitable, and "caused more than 50 deaths, most from the Atwood area."

Mexican-American war veterans from World War II worked to end school segregation in Placentia in 1948. This campaign was led by Alfred Aguirre, who noted that some white ranchers believed Mexicans were good fruit pickers, but that "the White kids are too advanced" for Mexican students to keep up in the classroom.

The Mexican-American community in Placentia developed its own political power base in the 1950s. This resulted in the election of Aguirre to Placentia's city council from 1958 to 1962 and the registration of hundreds of Chicano voters in the city.

In July 2020, Placentia organized and established its own fire department, Placentia Fire and Life Safety Department, leaving the Orange County Fire Authority as the first city to ever disband from the OCFA.

== Geography ==
According to the United States Census Bureau, the city has a total area of 6.6 square miles (17 km^{2}), of which 0.22% is covered by water. State Route 57 (the Orange Freeway) runs through the southwest section of Placentia. State Route 91 (the Riverside Freeway) passes directly south of the city. Districts in Placentia include the neighborhood of La Jolla and the formerly unincorporated community of Atwood.

=== Climate ===
According to the Köppen climate classification, Placentia has a warm-summer Mediterranean climate, CSA on climate maps.

== Demographics ==
Historical population
Census	Pop.	Note	%±
1930	1,606		—
1940	1,472		−8.3%
1950	1,682		14.3%
1960	5,861		248.5%
1970	21,948		274.5%
1980	35,041		59.7%
1990	41,259		17.7%
2000	46,488		12.7%
2010	50,533		8.7%
2020	51,824		2.6%
U.S. Decennial Census; 1860–1870 1880-1890; 1900 1910 1920; 1930 1940 1950; 1960 1970 1980; 1990 2000 2010; 2020

Placentia was first listed as a city in the 1930 U.S. Census. Prior to 1920, the area was part of unincorporated Fullerton Township (pop 5,037 in 1920).

=== Racial and ethnic composition ===
Placentia city, California – Racial and ethnic composition Note: the US Census treats Hispanic/Latino as an ethnic category. This table excludes Latinos from the racial categories and assigns them to a separate category. Hispanics/Latinos may be of any race.
Race / Ethnicity (NH = Non-Hispanic)	Pop 1980	Pop 1990	Pop 2000	Pop 2010	Pop 2020	% 1980	% 1990	% 2000	% 2010	% 2020
White alone (NH)	25,747	26,912	24,967	22,590	18,993	73.48%	65.23%	53.71%	44.70%	36.65%
Black or African American alone (NH)	424	696	746	818	946	1.21%	1.69%	1.60%	1.62%	1.83%
Native American or Alaska Native alone (NH)	250	139	177	123	105	0.71%	0.34%	0.38%	0.24%	0.20%
Asian alone (NH)	1,421	3,272	5,121	7,457	9,940	4.06%	7.93%	11.02%	14.76%	19.18%
Native Hawaiian or Pacific Islander alone (NH)	1,421	3,272	65	58	69	4.06%	7.93%	0.14%	0.11%	0.13%
Other race alone (NH)	81	66	61	74	219	0.23%	0.16%	0.13%	0.15%	0.42%
Mixed race or Multiracial (NH)	x	x	891	997	1,861	x	x	1.92%	1.97%	3.59%
Hispanic or Latino (any race)	7,118	10,174	14,460	18,416	19,691	20.31%	24.66%	31.10%	36.44%	38.00%
Total	35,041	41,259	46,488	50,533	51,824	100.00%	100.00%	100.00%	100.00%	100.00%

=== 2020 census ===
As of the 2020 census, Placentia had a population of 51,824. The population density was 7,837.9 inhabitants per square mile (3,026.2/km^{2}). The median age was 39.0 years, with 22.3% of residents under the age of 18, 9.7% aged 18 to 24, 25.6% aged 25 to 44, 26.1% aged 45 to 64, and 16.2% aged 65 or older. For every 100 females, there were 94.8 males, and for every 100 females age 18 and over there were 92.4 males age 18 and over.

The census reported that 99.3% of the population lived in households, 0.5% lived in noninstitutionalized group quarters, and 0.2% were institutionalized. The city was 100.0% urban and 0.0% rural.

There were 16,915 households, of which 36.5% included children under the age of 18. Of all households, 56.5% were married-couple households, 5.5% were cohabiting couple households, 24.4% had a female householder with no partner present, and 13.6% had a male householder with no partner present. About 17.4% of households were one person, and 9.7% were one person aged 65 or older. The average household size was 3.04. There were 12,897 families (76.2% of all households).

There were 17,368 housing units at an average density of 2,626.7 units per square mile (1,014.2 units/km^{2}), of which 16,915 (97.4%) were occupied. Of occupied units, 63.2% were owner-occupied and 36.8% were occupied by renters. The homeowner vacancy rate was 0.3% and the rental vacancy rate was 3.9%.

=== 2023 American Community Survey estimate ===
In 2023, the US Census Bureau estimated the median household income was $110,575, and the per capita income was $46,069. About 6.2% of families and 8.5% of the population were below the poverty line.

=== 2010 census ===
The 2010 United States census reported that Placentia had a population of 50,533. The population density was 7,677.0 people per square mile (2,964.1 people/km^{2}). The racial makeup of Placentia was:

- 31,373 (62.1%) White (44.7% Non-Hispanic White)
- 914 (1.8%) African American
- 386 (0.8%) Native American
- 7,531 (14.9%) Asian
- 74 (0.1%) Pacific Islander
- 8,247 (16.3%) from other races
- 2,008 (4.0%) from two or more races
- 18,416 residents (36.4%) were Hispanic or Latino, of any race.

The census reported that 50,196 people (99.3% of the population) lived in households, 253 (0.5%) lived in noninstitutionalized group quarters, and 84 (0.2%) were institutionalized.

Of the 16,365 households, 38.6% had children under 18 living in them, 57.4% were opposite-sex married couples living together, 12.6% had a female householder with no husband present, 5.5% had a male householder with no wife present, 4.6% were unmarried opposite-sex partnerships, and 0.6% were same-sex married couples or partnerships. About 17.6% of households were made up of individuals, and 7.8% had someone living alone who was 65 or older. The average household size was 3.07. There were 12,366 families (75.6% of all households); the average family size was 3.44.

In the city, the age distribution was 24.6% under 18, 10.3% from 18 to 24, 27.6% from 25 to 44, 24.9% from 45 to 64, and 12.6% were 65 or older. The median age was 36.0 years. For every 100 females, there were 97.0 males. For every 100 females 18 and over, there were 93.7 males.

The 16,872 housing units had an average density of 2,563.2 units per square mile (989.7 units/km^{2}), of which 10,681 (65.3%) were owner-occupied and 5,684 (34.7%) were occupied by renters. The homeowner vacancy rate was 0.8%; the rental vacancy rate was 4.7%. About 62.9% of the population lived in owner-occupied housing units and 36.5% lived in rental housing units.

The median household income was $75,693, with 12.2% of the population living below the federal poverty line.

== Economy ==
Placentia has a $20 million Metrolink project that started in the downtown area in 2013. This project is in conjunction with the Orange County Transit Authority (OCTA), and will assist in the continued revitalization of the area, which is also scheduled for the building of more transit-oriented housing to complement the train station, mixed use, retail, and entertainment. All are designed to enhance Placentia's unique presence in Orange County. Placentia is also working with the OCTA on the OC Bridges project. The project, combined with the city of Fullerton, provides around $580 million in funding to build underpasses and/or overpasses at the major north–south roadways in the two cities. The roadways are Lakeview Avenue, Rose Drive/Tustin Avenue, Orangethorpe Avenue, Kraemer Boulevard, Placentia Avenue, State College Boulevard, and Raymond Avenue. The underpasses and overpasses at Placentia, Kraemer, Rose/Tustin and Lakeview are complete.

=== Top employers ===
According to Placentia's 2012 Comprehensive Annual Financial Report, the top employers in the city are:

Rank	Employer	Employees
1	Placentia-Yorba Linda Unified School District	2,500
2	UCI Health - Placentia	390
3	Hartwell	300
4	Premedia	305
5	City of Placentia	215

== Arts and culture ==
The George Key Ranch Historic District is a historic citrus ranch and Victorian ranch house in Placentia. It is now within the 2-acre (0.81 ha) George Key Ranch Historic Park, with the historic house museum, outdoor displays, and a citrus grove. It is on the National Register of Historic Places. The Placentia-Santa Fe District is in the southwest or downtown area. The town is home to the A. S. Bradford House, a historic house museum. It is also home to the 100-year-old Berkenstock Mansion.

In 1973, Chicano Park's "founding lead artist" Guillermo Aranda and "founding apprentice artist" Ernesto "Neto" Paul (San Diego natives) collaborated with the art students of the University of California, Irvine (UCI) in painting a mural (about 8 x 36 ft) on the walls of the Tlatepaque Restaurant. Aranda was invited by a professor at UCI. The following year, the chairman of Toltecas en Aztlan, and the board director of the Centro Cultural De La Raza, Guillermo Aranda, also invited these same Orange County artists referred to as the "Santa Ana muralists/Santa Ana artists", to come to Chicano Park and paint on one of the first pillars (second painted pillar) of Chicano Park.

== Government and politics ==
Placentia city vote by party in presidential elections
Year	Democratic	Republican	Third Parties
2024	48.48% 12,263	48.18% 12,189	3.34% 845
2020	51.81% 13,616	46.17% 12,135	2.02% 531
2016	46.49% 9,828	46.43% 9,814	7.08% 1,497
2012	42.08% 8,581	55.66% 11,348	2.26% 461
2008	43.41% 9,022	54.51% 11,329	2.07% 431
2004	35.82% 7,028	63.15% 12,390	1.03% 203
2000	37.29% 6,674	59.12% 10,580	3.59% 643
1996	35.94% 5,673	54.58% 8,615	9.48% 1,497
1992	29.26% 5,097	48.01% 8,364	22.73% 3,959
1988	28.62% 4,612	70.31% 11,328	1.07% 172
1984	22.81% 3,396	76.39% 11,375	0.80% 119
1980	22.06% 3,142	69.17% 9,853	8.78% 1,250

=== Local ===
Placentia is a charter city with elected city council members, city clerk, and city treasurer, and professional city manager.

Elected officials

- Mayor Chad P. Wanke
- Mayor pro tem Jeremy B.Yamaguchi
- Council Member Ward Smith
- Council Member Thomas Hummer
- Council Member Kevin Kirwin
- City Clerk Robert S. McKinnell
- City Treasurer Kevin A. Larson

Appointed officials

- City Administrator Jennifer Lampman
- City Attorney Christian L. Bettenhausen

Mayors since 1989

Unless otherwise noted, mayoral terms begin and end in December.

Mayor	Term(s)
Norman Z. Eckenrode	1989–90, 1993–94, 1996–98
Arthur G. Newton	1990–91
John O. Tynes	1991–92
Maria Moreno	1992–93
Michael Maertzweiler	1994–95, 1999–2000
Carol Downey	1995–96
Constance Underhill	1998–99, 2006–07
Chris Lowe	2000–02
Scott P. Brady	2002–03, 2004–06
Judy Dickinson	2003–04
Gregory Sowards	2008–09
Joseph Aguirre	2009–10
Scott W. Nelson	2007–08, 2010–11, 2012–14
Jeremy Yamaguchi	2011–12, 2015–16
Chad Wanke	2014–15, 2017–18
Craig Green	2016–17
Rhonda Shader	2018–19

The voters of Placentia also elect the boards of the Placentia Library District and the Placentia-Yorba Linda Unified School District.

=== State and federal representation ===
In the California State Senate, Placentia is split between the 34th senatorial district, represented by Democrat Tom Umberg, and the 37th senatorial district, represented by Republican Steven Choi. In the California State Assembly, it is in the 59th Assembly district, represented by Republican Phillip Chen.

In the United States House of Representatives, Placentia is in California's 45th congressional district, represented by Democrat Derek Tran.

According to the California Secretary of State, as of February 10, 2019, Placentia has 27,328 registered voters. Of those, 10,285 (37.64%) are registered Republicans, 8,510 (31.14%) are registered Democrats, and 7,400 (27.08%) have no political party preference or are independent.

== Education ==
=== Placentia Library District ===
Placentia is served by the Placentia Library District, an independent special district governed by an elected board of trustees. The district was formed in 1919 and has served the community since then.

Today, the Placentia Library District has over 330,000 visitors annually, with over 42,000 library cards issued. The library holds over 102,000 materials. In September 2018, the Placentia Library began a major $2.3 million renovation/modernization project as part of the library's centennial anniversary. The project was completed on September 14, 2019.

=== Public schools ===
Placentia is a part of the Placentia-Yorba Linda Unified School District (PYLUSD). The three high schools in the city are:

- El Dorado High School.
- Valencia High School. The oldest high school in Placentia, it opened in 1933. VHS offers an international baccalaureate program and a technology track known as ValTech.
- El Camino Real High School was named a "Model Continuation High School" by the California State Department of Education.

In addition, Placentia supports: Kraemer Middle School, Valadez Middle School Academy, and Tuffree Middle School. The city houses numerous public elementary schools: Brookhaven Elementary, George Key Elementary, Golden Elementary, Morse Elementary, Melrose Elementary, Ruby Drive Elementary, Sierra Vista Elementary, Tynes Elementary, Van Buren Elementary, and Wagner Elementary.

=== Independent schools ===
The Parkview School provides an independent study kindergarten-grade 12 school for students who are "homeschoolers, student actors, junior athletes, chronically ill, or in various other situations for which an alternative to classroom-based instruction is desirable."

== Transportation ==
The Metrolink 91/Perris Valley Line passes through the southern portion of the city. The city has been preparing the area of a proposed new station located at Melrose Avenue and Crowther Avenue in Old Town Placentia. Placentia Station is estimated to cost $35 million; the city will contribute $5.4 million. A tentative completion date was set for June 2022, but construction is now "on hold" pending further negotiations with BNSF.

In 2007, the city became the first city to implement a quiet zone for the cargo-carrying trains that pass through the city daily, using locomotive grade-crossing predictors and intercrossing ground-based radio communications to effect a corridor where crossing gate arms become actuated prior to the train's approach, enabling trains to not be required to announce their approach by sounding the Morse code letter "Q" on their whistles, which is otherwise mandated by the Federal Railroad Administration. The city's Quiet-Zone-Update web pages offer information on the zone's scope and any temporary or long-term alterations to the quiet zone.

The city is served by the Orange County Transportation Authority's bus routes, with:

- Route 129 running also Kraemer Boulevard
- Route 71 running along Rose Drive
- Route 26 running along Yorba Linda Boulevard
- Route 123 running along Chapman Avenue
- Route 30 running along Orangethorpe Avenue

The 2002 Placentia train collision occurred on April 23, 2002, when a BNSF Railway freight train collided head-on with a Metrolink train in Placentia, near the Atwood Junction, at the intersection of Orangethorpe Avenue and Van Buren Street. Two people died in the crash and 22 were seriously injured.

== Notable people ==
- Agent Orange, a punk rock band, formed in Orange County in 1979.
- Kevin Blankenship, is a professional baseball player from Placentia and an El Dorado High School class of 1981 graduate.
- Bret Boone, a Major League Baseball second baseman, attended El Dorado High School.
- Michael Chang, professional tennis player, French Open champion, member of Hall of Fame
- Peter Daut, a news presenter at KESQ-TV, grew up in Placentia and graduated from El Dorado High School.
- Chris Draft, NFL professional football player
- Janet Evans, Olympic swimmer, four-time gold medalist
- Jackie Francois, musician
- Jason Freese, musician, touring keyboard player for the band Green Day
- Josh Freese, musician, drummer for the band Foo Fighters
- Michele Granger, softball pitcher, was born in Placentia.
- Courtney Hicks, figure skater, was born in Placentia.
- Kottonmouth Kings, hip hop group
- Kingspade, hip hop group
- Phil Nevin, baseball infielder
- Kherington Payne, So You Think You Can Dance contestant, Pussycat Doll
- Shawn Ray, bodybuilder
- Johnny Richter, rapper
- Equanimeous St. Brown, NFL professional football player
- Corrie ten Boom, a Holocaust survivor and rescuer in the Dutch underground during World War II, and author, emigrated to Placentia in 1977 and died there in 1983.
- Brett Tomko, a Major League Baseball player, attended El Dorado High School.
- Bailey Sok, a singer, professional dancer, choreographer and member of South Korean co-ed group AllDay Project.
