= Atwood, Placentia, California =

Atwood
- Neighborhood
- Location within the Los Angeles metropolitan area
- Coordinates: 33°51′57″N 117°49′51″W
- Country: United States
- State: California
- County: Orange County
- City: Placentia
- Time zone: UTC-8
  - Summer (DST): UTC-7
- Website: City of Placentia

Atwood is a small predominantly Mexican-American neighborhood in Placentia, California, United States. Atwood's unofficial boundaries are defined roughly as the area of Placentia in the square formed by Orangethorpe Avenue, Van Buren Street, Lakeview Road, and Miraloma Avenue. There is a post office in Atwood with a ZIP code of 92811. However, this ZIP code is only used for PO boxes. All non-PO box addresses in Atwood are listed as "Placentia" by the United States Postal Service (with the exception of the post office itself: 1679 E. Orangethorpe Avenue, Atwood, CA 92811).

There is a small business area of the community along Orangethorpe Ave. that includes the post office and restaurants, markets, a bar and other stores that cater to the area's predominantly Latino population. The Parque de Los Ninos city park can be found in the area along with a portion of a busy line of the BNSF Railway that runs parallel to Orangethorpe Ave.

== History ==
In 1887, the town was formerly named Richfield after the oil wells that pervaded the area. The town name was eventually changed to Atwood, after W. J. Atwood, an oil company executive, and was formerly an unincorporated town within Orange County before being annexed by the city of Placentia in the early 1970s.

At the turn of the 20th century, as described by the scholar Jody Vallejo, "Mexicans who did not live in East Los Angeles were segregated in suburbs in the Los Angeles metropolitan region, often referred to as 'company towns' that revolved around industry and manufacturing colonias, which, in Southern California, were typically segregated citrus-worker villages." Orange County was divided into eighteen small towns organized around the citrus industry which included the segregated company towns of predominantly Mexican-Americans, who "were isolated from the white population (often across railroad tracks or fenced in) in terms of housing, schools, entertainment, and even baseball teams". This legacy of segregation is the reason why Atwood, as well as other "distinct multi-generational Mexican American-concentrated neighborhoods that are working class and remain segregated, separated from affluent gated communities only blocks away" such as Casa Blanca, Riverside and La Jolla, Placentia, exist today.

The Orange County Citrus Strike of 1936, which protested poor working conditions and pay, included citrus workers from Atwood. In response to the strike, attacks on the participating barrios were launched, sometimes using tear gas, after the sheriff issued a "shoot to kill" order against the strikers, "implicitly giving license to vigilante activity". White women intentionally broke the strike by going to the orchards to pick oranges as the workers were striking, while white college students from Los Angeles came to "staff the roadside barricades" against the strikers.

The Santa Ana River flood of 1938 inundated Atwood after the water rose 5 feet in five minutes, following five days of heavy rain, reportedly "destroying everything but the La Jolla School Building and three brick structures". The flood left 3,700 refugees, 1,500 homes uninhabitable and "caused more than 50 deaths, most from the Atwood area". This catastrophe led to the construction of the Prado Dam upstream near Corona from 1938 to 1941.

In 1977, Chicano artist and teacher Manuel Hernandez-Trujillo created an unnamed mural in Atwood along a 260-foot-long wall above a river channel in Parque de Los Ninos. As reported by Lou Ponsi, the mural portrays "Mayan gods, Aztec eagles, orange groves, serpents, field workers, an image of the sun and a crossed rifle and sword – a representation of the Mexican Revolution". After it was "mistakenly whitewashed by county workers" in 2019, a restoration project was undertaken by Joshua Correa, Xochitl Zuniga, daughter of Hernandez-Trujillo, and Joe Parra.

The police shooting of Caesar Ray Cruz in 2009, a resident of Atwood and "a married father of five who at the time of death was heading home to take his boys to football practice," along with the other police shootings of predominantly Latino men, culminated in widespread protests in 2012 in Anaheim, California.
