= Empty & Beautiful =

Studio album by Matt Maher
- Released: April 8, 2008
- Studio: Vibe 56 and The Platinum Lab (Nashville, Tennessee); Jeff Thomas Productions and Wildwood Studios (Brentwood, Tennessee); The Bennett House and Ed's (Franklin, Tennessee); Dry Bones (Mesa, Arizona)
- Genre: Contemporary Christian music, worship
- Length: 52:38
- Label: Essential
- Producer: Matt Maher; Jeff Thomas; Ed Cash

Matt Maher chronology
Overflow (2006)	Empty & Beautiful (2008)	Alive Again (2009)

Empty & Beautiful is the debut studio album by Matt Maher, released on April 8, 2008. It was his first album with Essential Records. It reached No. 168 on the Billboard 200. The album also debuted at No. 6 on the Top Heatseekers charts.

== Critical reception ==
Professional ratings
Review scores
Source	Rating
Allmusic	4.5/5 stars
CCM Magazine	4/5 stars
Christian Music Review	4.5/5 stars
Cross Rhythms	4/5 stars
Jesus Freak Hideout	3/5 stars

Allmusic's Jared Johnson noted the album "may sound very familiar." Also, he said "his music is on par with Tomlin, and even Matt Redman, but it sounds so much like them that listeners may not discover the true depth of his talents."

CCM Magazine's Mike Parker evoked the album that "sounds effortless, familiar and inviting, even though it plumbs the depths of theological truth."

Christian Music Review's Jay Heilman stated how much he "enjoyed it and was lifted up by his message, his honesty and his conviction to put forth an album that would personally challenge me to re-analyze my life and ask myself the simple question."

Cross Rhythms's Julie Porter alluded to how Maher's music is "very much from the same kind of musical template as Chris Tomlin and to some extent Casting Crowns". She summed up the album that it "is an album bringing us great music from a fine new singer/songwriter."

Jesus Freak Hideout's David Taylor stated this album "is everything we've come to expect from recent modern worship albums: CCM radio-friendly pop with a hint of rock, piano ballads with lush string sections, and simple congregation-friendly lyrics. The only real weakness to this album is it stays a little too far inside that box to distinguish itself from the other artists in the genre."

== Track listing ==
Empty & Beautiful
No.	Title	Writer(s)	Length
1.	"Your Grace Is Enough"	Matt Maher; Additional lyrics: Chris Tomlin	4:25
2.	"Look Like a Fool"	Maher, Bill Staine	3:33
3.	"For Your Glory"	Maher	3:54
4.	"As It Is in Heaven"	Maher, Ed Cash	4:09
5.	"I Rejoice"	Maher	4:14
6.	"Maranatha (Come Again)"	Maher	3:22
7.	"Great Things"	Maher	4:19
8.	"Leave a Light On"	Maher	4:48
9.	"Shine Like the Son"	Maher	3:13
10.	"Unwavering"	Maher	5:59
11.	"Lay It Down"	Maher, Brenton Brown	5:26
12.	"Empty & Beautiful"	Maher	4:44
Total length:			52:38

== Personnel ==
- Matt Maher – vocals, programming (1, 5, 11), acoustic guitars (1–3, 5–8, 10, 11), electric guitars (1–3, 5–11), acoustic piano (2–4, 6, 8, 11), Hammond B3 organ (7, 8)
- Jeff Thomas – programming (1, 3, 5, 11), electric guitars (1, 2, 5, 6, 9–11), backing vocals (5, 8)
- Ben Shive – keyboards (4)
- Jason Webb – acoustic piano (12)
- Kenny Butler – electric guitars (1)
- Ed Cash – acoustic guitars (4), electric guitars (4), backing vocals (4)
- Kenny Greenberg – electric guitar (4)
- David Cleveland – electric guitars (7)
- Matt Pierson – bass (1–3, 5–11)
- Tony Lucido – bass (4)
- John O'Reilly – drums (1–3, 5–11)
- Dan Needham – drums (4)
- Ken Lewis – percussion (1, 2, 5, 7–9)
- Will Denton – percussion (3)
- David Davidson – strings (4)
- Keith Power – string arrangements (12)
- The Prague Symphony Orchestra – strings (12)
- Alyssa Bonagura – backing vocals (1, 2, 5–8, 11)
- Christine Denté – backing vocals (8)
- Nathan Young – backing vocals (8)
- Suzanne Young – backing vocals (8)

Singers on "As It Is In Heaven'

- Leanne Palmore, Christi Richardson, Jerard Woods and Jovaun Woods

== Production ==
- Blaine Barcus – A&R
- Matt Maher – producer (1–3, 5–12)
- Jeff Thomas – producer (1–3, 5–12), engineer (1–3, 5–12), mixing (1, 3, 6, 8–12)
- Ed Cash – producer (4), engineer (4), mixing (4)
- F. Reid Shippen – mixing (2, 5, 7)
- Scott Velasco – assistant tracking engineer (1–3, 5–12)
- Matt Armstrong – assistant engineer (4)
- Richard Dodd – mastering
- Heather Hertzler – A&R production
- Michael Kandros – design, photography
- Becka Blackburn – art direction
- Tim Parker – art direction
- Amber Lehman – styling
- Kat Davis at Red Light Management – management

== Charts ==
=== Album ===
Chart (2011)	Peak positions
US Billboard 200	168
US Billboard Christian Albums	12
US Billboard Heatseekers Albums	6

=== Singles ===
Year	Single	Peak chart positions
Year	Single	US Christian
2009	"Empty & Beautiful"	47
