= Alive Again (Matt Maher album) =

Studio album by Matt Maher
- Released: September 22, 2009
- Studio: The Smoakstack (Nashville, Tennessee): FabMusic (Franklin, Tennessee)
- Genre: Contemporary Christian music, worship
- Length: 55:30
- Label: Essential
- Producer: Paul Moak: Christopher Stevens

Matt Maher chronology
Empty & Beautiful (2008)	Alive Again (2009)	The Love in Between (2011)

Singles from Alive Again
- 1. "Alive Again" Released: 2009; 2. "Hold Us Together" Released: 2010; 3. "Christ Is Risen" Released: 2010

Alive Again is the second studio album by contemporary Christian musician Matt Maher, released on September 22, 2009. It is his second album with Essential Records. It reached #6 on the Billboard Christian albums chart, and reached #128 on the Billboard 200. The single "Alive Again" became the top selling Christian and Gospel single on iTunes Rewind. The song "Hold Us Together" was the No. 1 K-LOVE song of 2010.

== Critical reception ==
Professional ratings
Review scores
Source	Rating
Allmusic	Positive
Christian Music Review	(4.1/5)
Christianity Today	4/5 stars
Cross Rhythms	4/5 stars
Jesus Freak Hideout	3/5 stars
Jesus Freak Hideout	3/5 stars
Louder Than the Music	4.5/5 stars

Allmusic's Jared Johnson said this album "Matt takes a big leap forward on this record and offers some of the better-written praise & worship tracks to come along in some time."

Christian Music Review's Laura Chambers alluded to the album as having "no actual weeds; it is the senses and condition of the listener that alone determine the resonance each song will have."

Christianity Today's Andrea Bailey Willits noted that "discriminating ears long for intelligent worship songs cut from slightly darker cloth, and Matt Maher heeds that cry with an unselfconscious sophomore effort."

Cross Rhythms's Carl Grimsditch told of this album that "overall this is well crafted worshipful music."

Jesus Freak Hideout's Roger Gelwicks said he "can't honestly say that Alive Again is that unique of a worship experience." However, he said "anyone looking for solid, unique worship would be wise to look there, but if you were a fan of Matt Maher's first outing, his follow-up will suit you just fine."

Jesus Freak Hideout's Sara Kelm called this "a decent offering from this worship leader." But she was highly critical, when she said "it could easily be transitioned from the album to a church worship setting, even stereotypically bringing down the volume for a chorus before ramping it up again. That's the major problem with this album, if one could call it that. This collection of songs is nothing special. Most of the songs, while having nice melodies, do not strike me as particularly different or challenging. The album has a common worship sound, with no real risks taken. Plus, the last half of the album seems weighed down with mellow songs, slowing the pace considerably." Furthermore, she noted "if you want a worship album that is something different and new in terms of style and sound, look around at some of the other worship albums released this year. But if you liked Maher's first album and just really like the basic 'worship album' feel, this would be a good album for you."

Louder Than the Music's Jono Davies said this album "is a very clean and powerful worship album and over time has grown on me as one of my favorite albums of the year." In addition, Davies noted that "overall a wonderful album, not scared to sing out the name of Jesus in the lyrics."

=== Accolades ===
In 2010, the album was nominated for a Dove Award for Praise & Worship Album of the Year at the 41st GMA Dove Awards. The title song was also nominated for Worship Song of the Year.

== Track listing ==
CD track order
No.	Title	Writer(s)	Length
1.	"Alive Again"	Maher, Jason Ingram	3:59
2.	"Shout of the King"	Maher, Sarah Reeves	4:06
3.	"Sing Over Your Children"	Maher, Ingram	4:17
4.	"Hold Us Together"	Maher, Steve Wilson	3:27
5.	"No Greater Love"	Maher, Audrey Assad, Chris Tomlin	3:02
6.	"Love Comes Down"	Maher, Assad, Michael Gungor, Paul Moak	4:43
7.	"Flesh and Bone"	Maher, Marc Byrd, Sarah Hart	6:05
8.	"Remembrance (Communion Song)"	Maher, Matt Redman	5:18
9.	"Letting Go"	Maher, Moak	5:27
10.	"You Were on the Cross"	Maher, Assad, Kenny Butler	5:15
11.	"Christ Is Risen"	Maher, Mia Fieldes	4:56
12.	"Garden"	Maher, Assad	4:51
Total length:			55:30

== Personnel ==
- Matt Maher – vocals, acoustic piano, Fender Rhodes, acoustic guitar, glockenspiel, vibraphone
- Audrey Assad – acoustic piano, backing vocals
- Cason Cooley – acoustic piano, electric piano, Omnichord
- Christopher Stevens – programming, backing vocals
- Tyler Burkum – guitars, electric guitar, backing vocals
- Paul Moak – electric guitar, acoustic guitar, baritone guitar, pedal steel guitar, bass, backing vocals
- Tony Lucido – bass, Moog bass
- Jeremy Lutito – drums, percussion, programming
- Will Sayles – percussion
- Claire Indie – cello
- Chris Carmichael – strings, string arrangements
- Blaine Barcus – backing vocals
- Addie Davis – backing vocals
- Nina Williams – backing vocals
- Jamie Lee Wilson – backing vocals

== Production ==
- Blaine Barcus – A&R
- Paul Moak – producer, engineer, recording
- Christopher Stevens – producer, mixing
- Jake Hartsfield – assistant engineer
- Scott Hundley – assistant engineer
- Justin March – assistant engineer
- Richard Dodd – mastering at RichardDodd.com
- Heather Hetzler – A&R coordinator
- Tim Parker – art direction, design
- Tec Petaja – photography
- Heather Cummings – hair stylist, make-up
- The Brown Book Agency – management

== Charts ==
=== Album ===
Chart (2011)	Peak positions
US Billboard 200	128
US Billboard Christian Albums	6

=== Singles ===
Year	Single	Peak chart positions
Year	Single	US Christian
2009	"Alive Again"	12
2010	"Hold Us Together"	6
2011	"Christ Is Risen"	18
