= National Catholic Youth Conference =

American conference

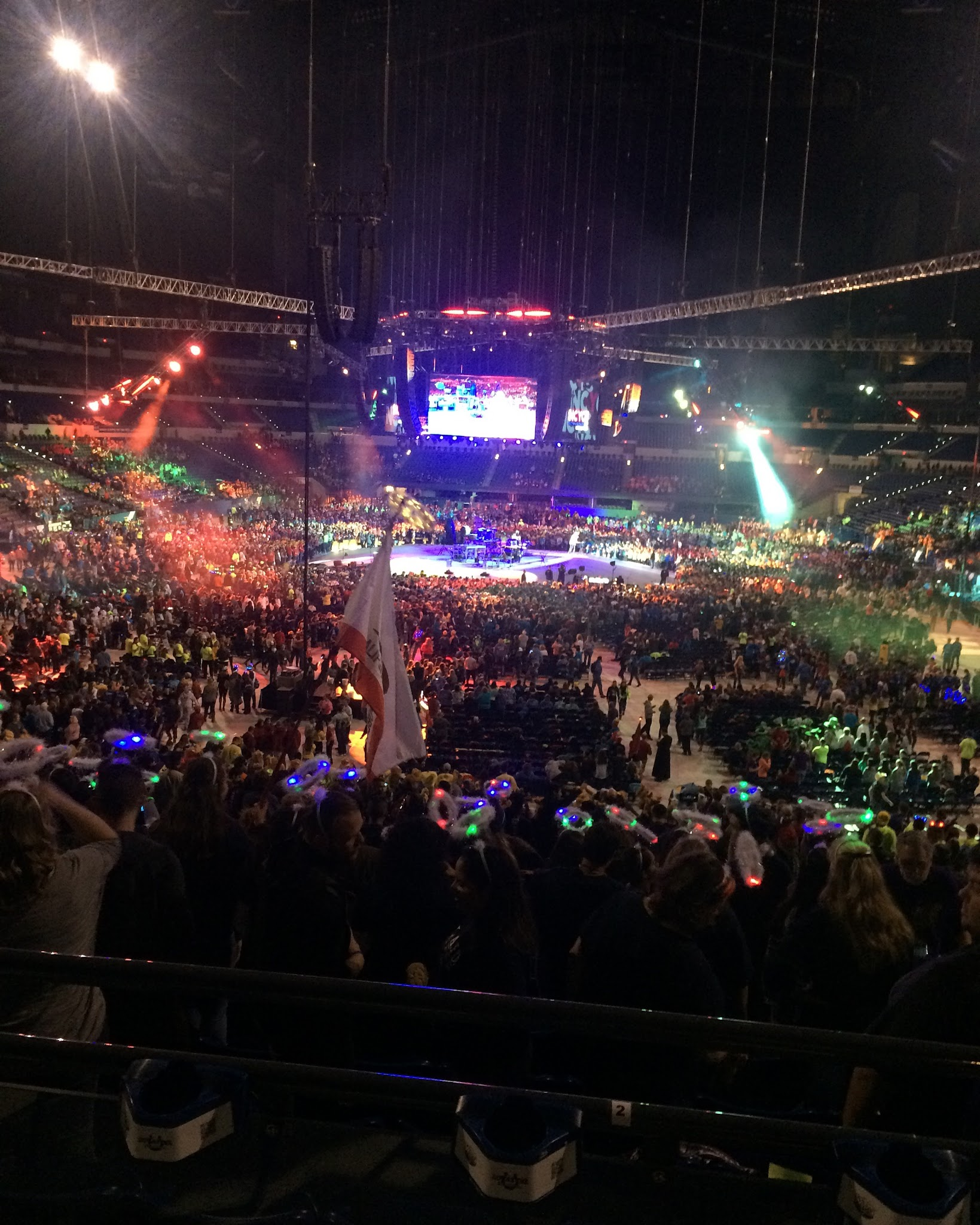
National Catholic Youth Conference in Indianapolis, IN 2015

The National Catholic Youth Conference, frequently referred to as NCYC, is a three-day event for Roman Catholic youth. NCYC is held in U.S. cities every year and organized in part by the host diocese of the city. NCYC gathers High School aged Catholic youth nationwide, inviting participants to encounter the lord, and leave empowered for discipleship. The conference is organized by the National Federation for Catholic Youth Ministry (NFCYM). During the conference, there is music, prayer, workshops, liturgy, and opportunities to participate in the Sacrament of Penance, otherwise known as Reconciliation or Confession.

There are also concerts, dances, and a comedy club at NCYC. An area, known as the "Interactive Exhibit Hall," is set up with interactive educational and recreational activities, as well as traditional exhibits and vendor booths.

The nature of the NCYC conference requires large indoor facilities for a conference. The Nationwide Arena was used in conjunction with the Columbus Convention Center at the 2007 NCYC, where the 20,000 seat arena space was used for general sessions and participants walked to the convention center for breakout sessions including workshops and larger concurrent sessions. At the 2009 conference, the general session was duplicated via live video stream to the Grand Ballroom of the Kansas City Convention Center for overflow purposes. There were over 5,000 in overflow seating as the Sprint Center seated only 19,000. NCYC does not use club-level seats in participating arenas, lowering the optimum seating capacity, but floor seats are available on a first come, first served basis.

The 2011 NCYC was held at Lucas Oil Stadium in Indianapolis. The event's main sessions were broadcast around the world online. During the day, the participants spent the day in the Indiana Convention Center for small workshops and influential speakers. The city of Indianapolis has since hosted the 2013, 2015, 2017, 2019, and 2023 conferences. Christian artist Matt Maher made an appearance at the 2013 conference. For King & Country performed at the 2019 and 2023 conferences.

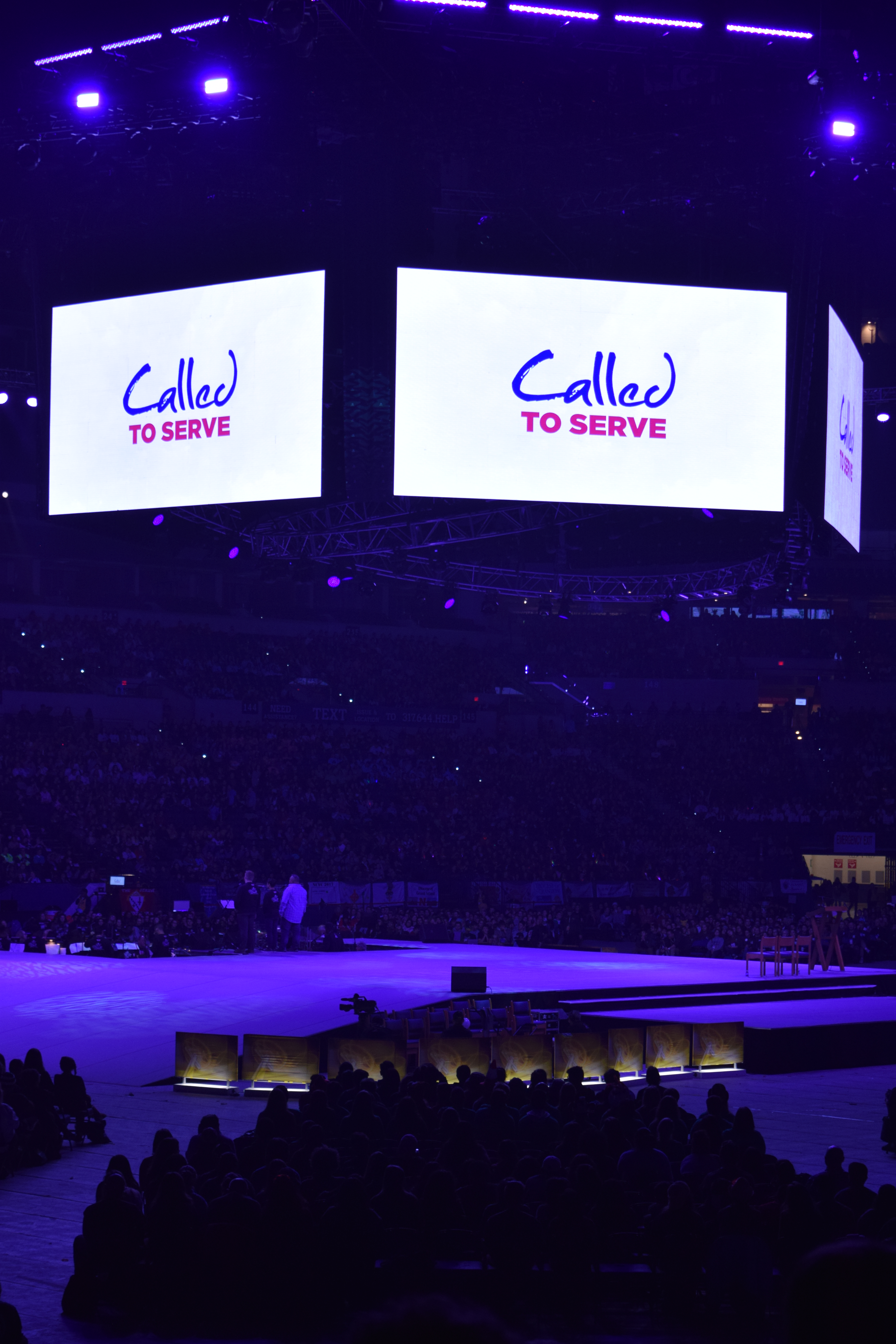
2017 NCYC in Indianapolis, IN

At the 2019 NCYC, also held at Lucas Oil Stadium, Pope Francis addressed the conference with a prerecorded video message. This is the first time that a sitting pope has addressed NCYC.

== History ==
NCYC began in 1983 as a regional conference, with one session for the east coast and one session for the west coast. The regional conferences had a few thousand youth in attendance. NCYC was merged into a national conference in 1991 and interest in the conference began to grow. The conference now attracts over 20,000 youth and adults for three days of worship, music, and fun.

National Catholic Youth Conferences
Year	Attendance	Host city	Theme
2025	15,700	Indianapolis, Indiana	I Am / Yo Soy
2024	3,000	Long Beach, California	El Camino / The Way
2023	12,000	Indianapolis, Indiana	Fully Alive
2022	2,000–3,000*	Long Beach, California	Walking on Water
2021	11,000*	Indianapolis, Indiana	Ablaze
2019	25,000	Indianapolis, Indiana	Blessed Broken Given
2017	23,000	Indianapolis, Indiana	Called / Llamados
2015	25,000	Indianapolis, Indiana	Here I Am Lord / Aquí Estoy Señor
2013	23,000	Indianapolis, Indiana	Signed. Sealed. Delivered.
2011	23,000	Indianapolis, Indiana	Called to Glory
2009	23,000	Kansas City, Missouri	Christ Reigns
2007	20,000	Columbus, Ohio	Discover the Way
2005	22,000	Atlanta, Georgia	Winds of Change
2003	22,000	Houston, Texas	River of Life
2001	25,000	Indianapolis, Indiana	Hope at the Crossroads
1999	22,400	St. Louis, Missouri	Gateway@st.louis.ncyc99
1997	17,500	Kansas City, Missouri	Take it to Heart
1995	11,000	Minneapolis, Minnesota	Voices that Challenge
1993	9,000	Philadelphia, Pennsylvania	Let the Spirit Ring
1991	7,200	Indianapolis, Indiana	
1989	5,800	Louisville, Kentucky/Denver, Colorado	Come and See
1987	5,000	Portland, Oregon/Pittsburgh, Pennsylvania	Love is Our Shelter, Together We Build
1985	3,850	Phoenix, Arizona/Biloxi, Mississippi	
1983	3,300	San Francisco, California/Washington DC	

*Indicates "in-person" attendance due to COVID-19 restrictions
