= La Jolla, Placentia, California =

La Jolla
- Neighborhood of Placentia
- Interactive map of La Jolla
- Coordinates: 33.8575151°N 117.8764474°W
- Country: United States
- State: California
- County: Orange
- City: Placentia
- Time zone: PST
  - Summer (DST): PDT
- Website: placentia.org

La Jolla is a small neighborhood in Placentia, California, in northern Orange County. Traditionally, La Jolla has largely been made up of Hispanics, but does have some non-Hispanic whites and people of other races. This small neighborhood was once known as La Jolla Colony, Placentia, and was not considered part of unincorporated Anaheim. Today, like the nearby community of Atwood, La Jolla is part of the City of Placentia. Since its construction, La Jolla has been bisected by the Orange (57) Freeway; however, there is a traffic and pedestrian bridge over the freeway.

La Jolla was severely damaged in the Orange County flood of 1938 which destroyed almost every structure in the area with the exception of McFadden School, a small church, and about 7 blocks of homes.

La Jolla is primarily a residential area made up of older single-family homes and several apartment complexes. La Jolla does not have many businesses except for a couple of small independent neighborhood markets. The three main stores in the area are the Urdiano's Market on West La Jolla Street, Gonzales Market on the east side of the 57 Freeway, and Pee Wee's Market on the west side. The Gonzales Market is believed to have been constructed shortly after the Orange County flood of 1936. Pee Wee's Market was opened in late 1959 by the Magaña family, long-time residents of Placentia.

The corner of La Jolla Street and Melrose at the east end of the La Jolla neighborhood was once the site of McFadden Elementary School, a segregated Mexican-only school. The school was torn down in the early 1980s and was later replaced by Melrose Elementary School. The attached park is still known as McFadden Park.

Brent Liles, former bassist for Social Distortion, died on January 18, 2007, in La Jolla. He was struck by a truck as he rode his bicycle across a street.
