= Cornerstone Christian School (Camarillo, California) =

Location
- 1777 Arneill Road; Camarillo, California 93010; 34°14′08″N 119°02′23″W

Information
- Type: Private
- Established: 1981
- NCES School ID: A1700181
- Principal: Jennifer Baer
- Enrollment: 206 (2021–02) (81 in 9-12; 2009–10)
- Campus: Small city
- Colors: Yellow and black
- Team name: Eagles
- Accreditation: ACSI, WASC
- Website: www.ccsed.org

Cornerstone Christian School (CCS) is a private Christian school in Camarillo, California. The school provides instruction from preschool through eighth grade. CCS was established in 1981 as a K–12 school; high school grades were dropped in 2011 due to falling enrollment. The school is accredited by the Association of Christian Schools International and the Western Association of Schools and Colleges.

== Athletics ==
Cornerstone Christian School's athletic teams were nicknamed the Eagles. During its history as a high school, CCS was a member of the CIF Southern Section (CIF-SS) and competed in small-school conferences such as the Condor and Omega leagues. The school earned a total of six CIF-SS titles including back-to-back section championships in girls' volleyball (1996, 1997), softball (1998, 1999), and baseball (2009, 2010). Cornerstone Christian dropped athletics in 2010 due to budget cuts; this led to a sharp decrease in enrollment that prompted the elimination of high school grades in 2011 after three decades as a K–12 school.
