= Western Athletic Conference (CIFSS) =

High school athletic league in California

The Western Athletic Conference is a high school athletic league that is part of the CIF Southern Section. It is an amalgamation of the Express League and the San Joaquin League (now the Santa Cruz League).

== Members ==
- Anaheim Discovery Christian School
- Avalon High School
- Bethel Baptist School
- Capistrano Valley Christian Schools
- Cornelia Connelly High School
- Eastside Christian High School
- Emerson Honors School
- Fairmont Preparatory Academy
- Liberty Christian School
- LaVerne Lutheran High School
- Legacy College Prep
- Orangewood Academy
- Saddleback Valley Christian Schools
- Shepherds Grove School
- Southlands Christian Schools
- St. Michael's Preparatory School
- Tarbut V' Torah (TVT)
- The Webb Schools
