= Valley Christian Academy =

Valley Christian Academy can refer to:

== Canada ==
- Valley Christian Academy (Osler, Saskatchewan)

== United States ==
- Valley Christian Academy (Santa Maria, California)
