= Coast Valley League =

The Coast Valley League is a high school athletic conference that is affiliated with the CIF Southern Section (CIF-SS). As of the 2020–21 school year, members are small schools located in San Luis Obispo, Santa Barbara, and Kern counties. The league sponsors eight-man football.

== Members ==
- Coast Union High School
- Coastal Christian School
- Cuyama Valley High School
- Maricopa High School
- Shandon High School
- Valley Christian Academy
- San Luis Obispo Classical Academy (freelance)
