= Orangeview Western 7-12 School =

Public middle and high school in California, United States

Location
- 501 South Western Avenue; Anaheim, California 92804; United States; 33°49′32″N 118°0′9″W

Information
- Type: Public high school
- Established: 2025
- School district: Anaheim Union High School District
- Principal: Lorena Moreno (Western High School)
- Principal: Bindi Crawford (Orangeview Junior High School)
- Grades: 7–12
- Athletics conference: Orange League
- Mascot: Pioneers (Western High School), Panthers (Orangeview Junior High School)
- Rival: Anaheim High School
- Website: https://western.auhsd.us/
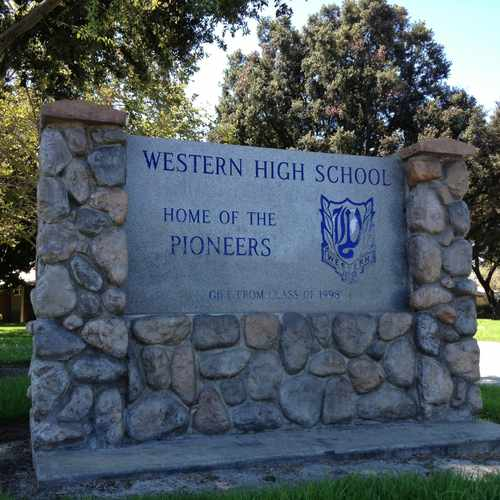

Orangeview Western 7-12 School, formerly known as Western High School and Orangeview Junior High School is a public school located in Anaheim, California, serving students in grades 7–12. The school is one of ten high schools in the Anaheim Union High School District. It is located in the western end of Anaheim and also serves southwest Buena Park and northwest Stanton. It was established in 2025. The school's mascots are the Pioneers (Western High School) and the Panthers (Orangeview Junior High School).

== Athletics ==
High school athletic teams compete in the CIF Southern Section of the California Interscholastic Federation and are known as the "Pioneers".

=== Fall ===
- Football
- Marching Band
- Girls Volleyball
- Boys' Cross-Country
- Girls' Cross-Country
- Girls' Golf
- Girls' Tennis
- Boys' Water Polo
- Cheerleading

=== Winter ===
- Boys' Basketball
- Girls' Basketball
- Boys & Girls Wrestling
- Girls' Water Polo
- Winter Cheerleading
- Winter Color Guard
- Boys & Girls Soccer

=== Spring ===
- Baseball
- Boys' Golf
- Boys' Tennis
- Boys’ Volleyball
- Boys'/Girls' Swimming
- Softball
- Boys' Track and Field
- Girls' Track and Field

== Notable staff and alumni ==
- Tiger Woods, professional golfer
- David Gilliland, NASCAR Sprint Cup Series driver
- Mike Iupati, National Football League (NFL) offensive lineman
- Andy Messersmith, Major League Baseball (MLB) pitcher
- Fili Moala, NFL player
- John Moses, MLB outfielder
- Dana Nafziger, NFL football player
- Lute Olson, NCAA basketball coach
- Mike Penner, sportswriter for Los Angeles Times
- Carol Rodríguez, Puerto Rican sprinter
- Randy Schekman, cell biologist, winner of 2013 Nobel Prize for Physiology or Medicine
- Rich Severson, MLB infielder
