= Coastal League =

US high school athletic league

The Coastal League is a high school athletic league that is part of the CIF Southern Section.

== Members ==
- California Academy of Math & Science
- The Geffen Academy
- Hawthorne Math and Science Academy
- Lennox Academy
- New Roads School
- Rolling Hills Preparatory School
- Vistamar School
- Wildwood School
