= Providence High School (Burbank, California) =

Private high school in Burbank, California, US

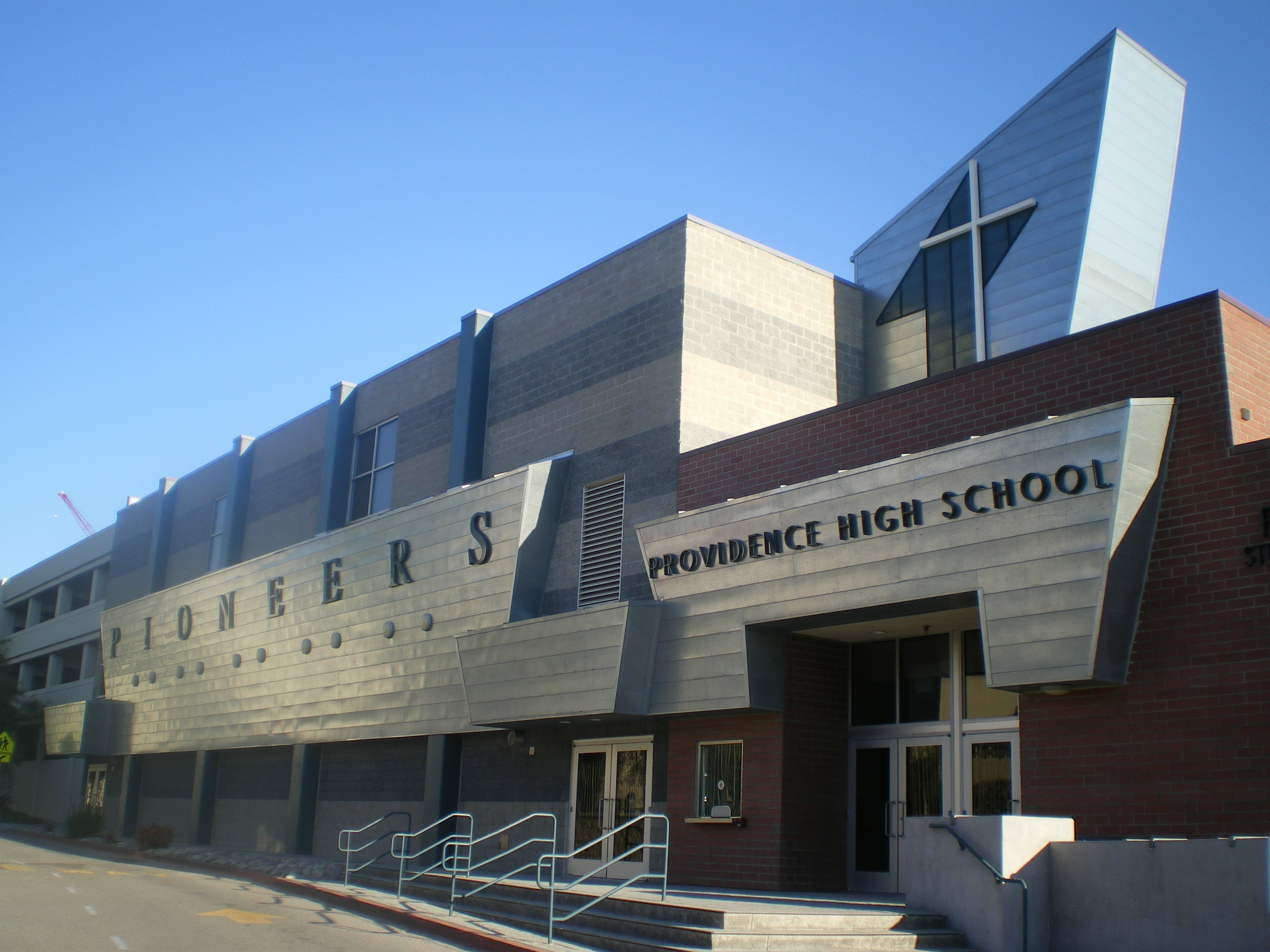

Location
- 511 South Buena Vista Street; Burbank, (Los Angeles County), California 91505; United States; 34°9′16″N 118°19′37″W

Information
- Type: Private, Coeducational, College Prep
- Religious affiliations: Roman Catholic; Sisters of Providence (Montreal, Quebec)
- Established: 1955
- Founder: Sister Mary Gleason, SP
- Oversight: Providence Health & Services
- CEEB code: 050402
- Head of school: Scott McLarty
- Staff: 32
- Faculty: 47
- Grades: 9-12
- Student to teacher ratio: 11:1
- Colors: Forest Green and Teal
- Athletics conference: CIF Southern Section; Liberty League (California)
- Nickname: Pioneers
- Accreditation: Western Association of Schools and Colleges, California Association of Independent Schools
- Yearbook: Esprit
- Affiliation: Providence Health & Services, Council for Advancement and Support of Education, National Association of Independent Schools, Southern California People of Color in Independent Schools
- Website: www.providencehigh.org

Providence High School in Burbank, California, is a co-ed, independent, Catholic, college preparatory high school, founded by the Sisters of Providence in 1955. Located in the Roman Catholic Archdiocese of Los Angeles.

== History ==
On 19 September 1955, the school was founded by the Sisters of Providence, who already had a presence in the San Fernando Valley and ran a hospital. It admitted 81 girls to its new educational facility. Due to construction delays, the building was not finished upon their arrival, and they started instruction in circus tents in the school parking lot. By November 1955, the school's building completed construction. In 1959, 68 students would attend its first commencement ceremony.

In 1960, the school was accredited by the Board of Admissions and Relations of the University of California. During the 1970s, enrollment dipped dangerously low, as was the trend throughout the Archdiocese of Los Angeles at that time due to the aging population of the San Fernando Valley and stiff competition from other private schools. According to the Burbank Leader, in 1974 the school opened its enrollment to boys and became co-educational institution. The order considered closing the school by the mid-1980s due to financial issues but newly-appointed principal Sister Lucille Dean, with the support of staff and parents, reiterated her commitment to keep the school open. Under her leadership, the school campus underwent a renovation program and the curriculum was expanded. Special programs focused on healthcare and media communications were added to the school curriculum, leveraging on the order's affiliation with the nearby Providence Saint Joseph Medical Center and the school's location in a major hub for the entertainment industry. In 1998, the school was recognized as a Blue Ribbon School.

Providence High School transitioned to an independent school organizational model in 2011 and no longer directly run by the Sisters of Providence. The school continues to maintain an affiliation with Providence Health System, the organization which runs Providence Saint Joseph Medical Center, and has sisters serving in its Board of Regents. Under the new model, Joe Sciuto served as the school's first Head of School from 2011 to 2019. Scott McLarty was selected to become Providence High School's second Head of School in 2019

== Signature Programs ==
=== Cinema Arts Program ===
The Cinema Arts Program intends to help students explore media through an in-depth hands-on curriculum. The program conducts various activities through the Cinema Arts Center, an art studio accessible to students. Cinema Arts students are given the opportunity to compete in various film competitions and to hear from guest speakers currently working in the industry.

=== Medical Program ===
The four-year program covers topics from health, medicine, and biotechnology to health care within political, social, economic, religious and ethical frameworks.

The program is the result of a partnership between Providence High School and Providence Saint Joseph Medical Center. Expansion of the program now includes participation and support of the following organizations/institutions: Providence Holy Cross Medical Center, Shriner's Hospital, University of Southern California University Hospital, LAC+USC Medical Center, Glendale Memorial Hospital, Kaiser Permanente, Midway Medical Center, Huntington Memorial Hospital, and Cedars-Sinai Medical Center.

=== Technology Program ===
The Technology Program is designed as a broad-based introduction to various kinds of technology, providing a launching pad for further college study and industry application.

== Notable alumni ==
- Gina Gillespie
- Gunnar Sizemore
- Helen Hunt
- Jeff Cirillo
- Josie Totah
- Marcus LoVett Jr.
- Mena Suvari
- Paul Mirkovich
