= Linfield Christian School =

Location
- 31950 Pauba Road; Temecula, California; United States; 33°30′03″N 117°06′42″W

Information
- Type: Private
- Religious affiliation: Christian
- Established: 1936
- Faculty: 51.9 (on FTE basis)
- Grades: K to 12
- Enrollment: 896 (2007–08)
- Student to teacher ratio: 17.3:1
- Colors: Navy, light blue, and white
- Athletics conference: CIF - Southern Section; Ambassador League
- Mascot: Lion
- Website: www.linfield.com

Linfield Christian School (LCS) is a private, co-educational, college-preparatory K-12 Christian school located on a 100-acre campus in Temecula, California, a city that is located between San Diego and Los Angeles. The school’s colors are navy blue, light blue and white, and the school mascot is the Lion. The current student enrollment is approximately 1,100 students.

== History ==
Linfield Christian School, founded and established in 1936, was originally located in Los Angeles and was named the Culter Academy after its founder, Dr. Mabel Culter. Dr. Culter began the school in a home with seven students. Rapid increases in enrollment necessitated several relocations of the campus within Los Angeles. In 1968, the academy moved to its present site and reopened in 1972 as Linfield. Don Odell was president at the time of the relocation and Dr. Robert Mounce was the first headmaster.

== Accreditation and memberships ==
The school is governed by a Board of Trustees, accredited by the Western Association of Schools and Colleges (WASC K-12), and holds membership in the Association of Christian Schools International (ACSI) and California Interscholastic Federation (CIF). Linfield is also a member of the National Association for College Admission Counseling and subscribes to the Statement of Principles and Good Practice.

== Academic program ==
The curriculum at the high school adheres to the entrance requirements of the University of California and California State University school systems.

== Athletics ==
Linfield Christian High School competes with teams in the California Interscholastic Federation.

=== Recent accomplishments ===
==== 2010-Present ====
- Basketball (B) CIF Champion
- Basketball (G) CIF Champion
- Tennis (G) CIF Champion
- Football CIF Champion

==== 2009-10 ====
- Football CIF Champion
- Girls Tennis CIF Semi-Finalist
- Baseball CIF Finalist
- Basketball (B) CIF Semi-Finalist
- Boys Tennis CIF Semi-Finalist
