= Loyola High School (Los Angeles) =

Catholic college-prep high school in California, US

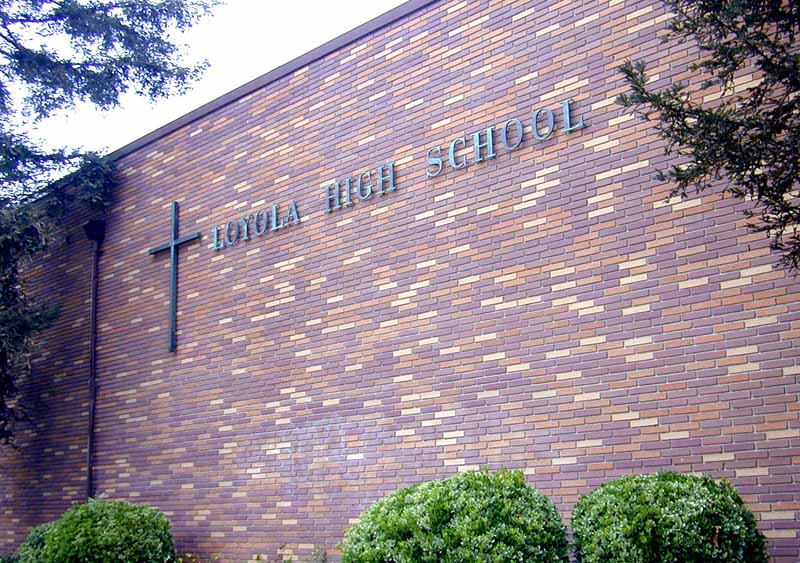

Location
- 1901 Venice Boulevard; Los Angeles, California 90006; United States; 34°02′42″N 118°17′49″W

Information
- Type: Private, college-preparatory high school
- Religious affiliation: Catholic
- Established: 1865; 161 years ago
- Oversight: Society of Jesus
- NCES School ID: 00071741
- President: Jamal K. Adams
- Principal: Paul Jordan
- Teaching staff: 88.5 (on an FTE basis)
- Grades: 9–12
- Gender: Boys
- Enrollment: 1,242 (2017–2018)
- Student to teacher ratio: 14.0:1
- Colors: Navy and white
- Athletics conference: CIF Southern Section; Mission League
- Nickname: Cubs
- Accreditation: Western Association of Schools and Colleges
- Publication: Windowpanes (literary and art magazine)
- Newspaper: The Loyalist
- Yearbook: El Camino
- Tuition: $26,600 (2024–25)
- Website: www.loyolahs.edu

Loyola High School is a private, Catholic, college-preparatory high school for boys in Los Angeles, California, United States. It was established in 1865 and is part of the Society of Jesus. It is the oldest continuously run educational institution in Southern California.

== History ==
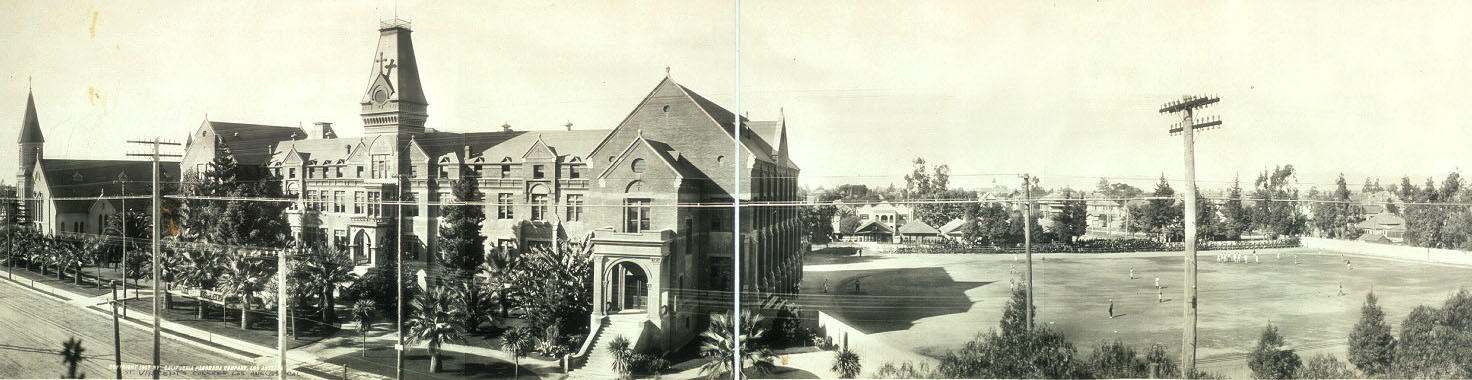
St. Vincent's College, circa 1908.

Loyola High School of Los Angeles is the region's oldest continuing educational institution, pre-dating the Los Angeles public school and the University of California systems. The school began in the downtown plaza Lugo adobe in 1865 as Saint Vincent's College at the behest of Archdiocese of Los Angeles Bishop Thaddeus Amat. After relocating to Hill Street in 1869 and to Grand Avenue in 1889, the Vincentian fathers ceded control of the school to the Society of Jesus in 1911, and it relocated to Avenue 52 in Highland Park as the prep school Los Angeles College. In 1917, the school moved to its current location on Venice Boulevard after the copper magnate and Irish philanthropist Thomas P. Higgins helped secure land for the school.

The college was renamed Loyola College the following year in honor of Ignatius of Loyola, the founder of the Society of Jesus. Until 1929, the campus housed the college, the law school, and the high school. At that time, the Jesuits purchased additional property to house the college and acquired separate facilities for Loyola Law School just west of downtown Los Angeles. The college, now Loyola Marymount University, was moved to the area now known as Westchester in West Los Angeles.

The school's recent campus development occurred in the 1980s: the gym, track, swimming pool, and additional classroom space were built after the administration secured significant donations. A $30 million renovation with donations from the William Hannon Foundation, the Ardolf Family, and others have provided for a new science building, counseling, and student centers, additional classrooms, and central plaza, which were operational as of June 2007, when construction of a new Xavier Center was begun. Hannon Theatre on campus, with its large stage, serves the students along with actors from throughout Southern California.

== Profile ==
=== Admissions ===
The primary admissions entry point for Loyola High School is 9th grade, with varying transfer opportunities offered in 10th and 11th grades. Transfer is not allowed in the senior year, except for rare situations. Admission is based on standardized test scores, recommendations from the candidate's teachers, principal, and minister, involvement in extracurricular activities, a personal statement, and grades.

Loyola draws its students from throughout the greater Los Angeles area, from Pacific Palisades to East L.A., from Pasadena to San Pedro, from the South Bay as well as the San Fernando, San Gabriel, Santa Clarita, and Hidden Valleys. Nearly 50% of the student body is composed of individuals of African-American, Latino, and Asian heritage, which serves to enhance the ethnic and socio-economic diversity of the school.

Approximately 800 students apply for 310 slots in the first-year class each year.

=== Curriculum ===
Four years each of social studies and English studies courses are required, along with three years of foreign language study and of science and one year of fine art. Eight semesters of theology are also a central part of the curriculum, covering Holy Scripture, systematic theology, Catholic social thought, moral theology, and one senior elective. Advanced Placement courses are offered in 25 subject areas with a historical "pass" rate of almost 80%, and students are encouraged to take various electives outside the required courses. Loyola also offers more than 19 Honors courses. Ninety-six percent of Loyola graduates attend a four-year college.

In 2014, Loyola sent 23 students to USC with an 18% acceptance rate: the Loyola contingent was the most from any school.

In 2017, among 153 private high schools in the Los Angeles metro area, Niche ranked Loyola 13th in college readiness, and among 52 Catholic high schools 2nd overall with an A+ grade. Also, according to Niche, Loyola is the best all boy school.

=== Service ===
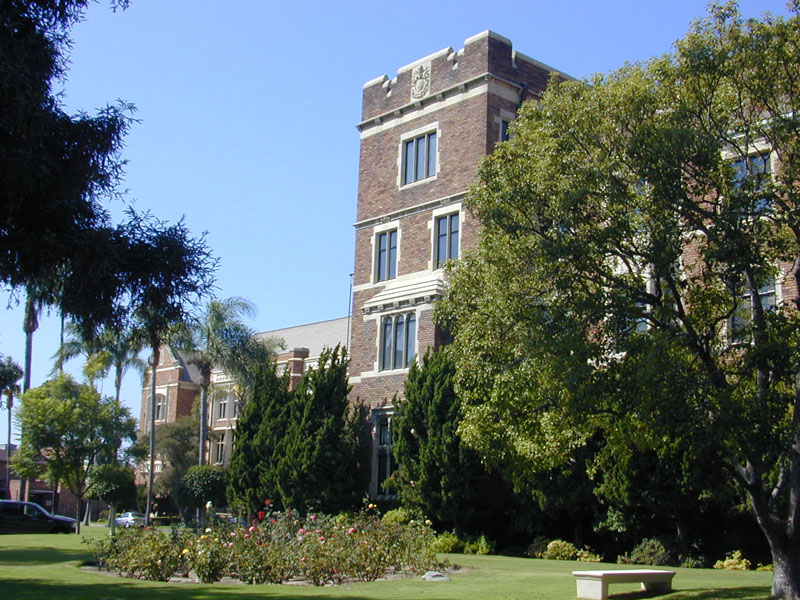
Loyola High School, fronting Venice Boulevard.

Overall, each Loyola student completes a minimum of 150 hours of direct service by graduation, with many of them matriculating with between 250 – 300 hours. Non-credit service activities include the annual Community Service Fair conducted each September, the Community Service Leadership Team, the annual AIDS Walk Los Angeles, the Peace and Justice Coalition, the annual School of the America's Watch and Ignatian Teach-In conducted just before Thanksgiving, Catholic Lobby Day in Sacramento, California, an annual social justice speakers series, and ongoing collection of food, clothing, books, and toys for distribution to the needy served by some of the school's 1,000 placement partners. Service and justice are two significant factors in making the most of the "Big Seven" awards for graduating seniors each June. Outstanding service leadership is recognized at the annual student awards ceremony and the Annual Community Service Awards Banquet held each May.

Loyola is an active member of the Ignatian Solidarity Network (ISN), an association of 70 US Jesuit high schools, colleges, and universities engaged in social advocacy and justice education for students and adults. National and regional topical workshops included Loyola's hosting 500 students and adults from the US and Mexico for the 2008 ISN conference on comprehensive immigration reform. In recent years, Loyola delegations have participated in national conferences on racism and poverty in New Orleans (2007) and comprehensive immigration advocacy in Washington, DC (2009). The 2010 ISN program occurred in Washington, DC, and focused on immigration, the environment, health care, and education.

=== Athletics ===
Loyola High School has a strong history of athletic success, including national championships in football and volleyball. Loyola has won at least one California Interscholastic Federation (CIF) title for ten years running and won their tenth CIF Commissioner's Cup in 2022. In the 2002-2003 academic year, Loyola set the California state record for most section championships (5) won in a single school year: cross-country, basketball, volleyball, track, and golf. The Cubs matched their still-standing state record in the 2015-2016 school year, winning section titles in golf, lacrosse, swimming, volleyball, and soccer.

- Baseball: CIF Champs - 1954, 2007 Mission League Champs - 1996, 2005, 2013, 2014
- Basketball: CIF AAAA/Div I-A Champs - 1953, 2002, 2003, 2011
- Cross Country: Mission League Champs - 1994 through 2018; CIF Champs - 1984, 1985, 2002, 2004, 2007; CIF State Champs - 2002, 2004, 2007, 2008, 2010, 2015; Nike Cross Nationals - 2007 (8th in U.S.), 2008 (15th in U.S.)
- Football: CIF AAAA/Div I Champs - 1962, 1963, 1975, 1990, 2003, 2005; National Champs - 1975 (National Sports News Service)
- Golf: CIF Div Champs - 2000, 2001, 2003, 2005, 2016, 2017, 2019, 2022
- Lacrosse: CIF Certification - 2006; Mission League Champs - 2007, 2009; Division II champions - 2011, Division I champions - 2016, 2017, 2018; CIF Southern Section Champions - 2021
- Soccer: CIF Division I/Division II Champs - 1998, 2005, 2007, 2014, 2016 State Champs (Nationally ranked 5th, ranked 1st in the state)
- Swimming/Diving: CIF Champs - 1984, 1994, 1996, 1997, 2011 (State Champs, 4th in U.S.), 2016 2019
- Tennis: CIF Champs Div 1-A - 1980, 2-A - 1982, 1984, 1986
- Track & Field: CIF Champs - 1984, 2000, 2003, 2004, 2008, 2009, 2010, 2011, 2012, 2013; National Champs - 2011 (Nike Track Nationals)
- Volleyball: CIF Div I Champs - 1983, 1985, 1986, 1987, 1988, 1995, 2003, 2004, 2005, 2009, 2010, 2016, 2023 (Nationally ranked 2nd), 2024 (Nationally ranked 1st); National Champs - 2009 (ESPN RISE) CIF Div 1 STATE Champs - 2009, 2010 & 2012, 2022,2024
- Water Polo: Mission League Champs - 2008, 2009, 2010, 2011, 2012, 2017; CIF Div I Champs - 2021, 2025

Top All-Boys Athletic Program in the nation as ranked by ESPN RISE: 2008, 2009, 2010, 2011

Loyola's football team competes in the Serra League. The team achieved a successful 2011-2012 campaign by notching eight wins. During the 2015-16 season, the Cubs ended the regular season 8-2, including a perfect 7-0 on the road. This record led them to their first CIF Division 1 playoff appearance since 2011. They eventually lost in the second round to nationally ranked St. John Bosco, finishing the season with a 9-3 record and ranked in California's Top 15 football programs. Loyola football most recently won 4-straight Angelus League Championships to earn promotion to the Mission League.
