= Coastal Christian School =

Coastal Christian School may refer to:

- Coastal Christian School (California)
- Coastal Christian School (Maine)
