= Marcus LoVett Jr. =

American basketball player

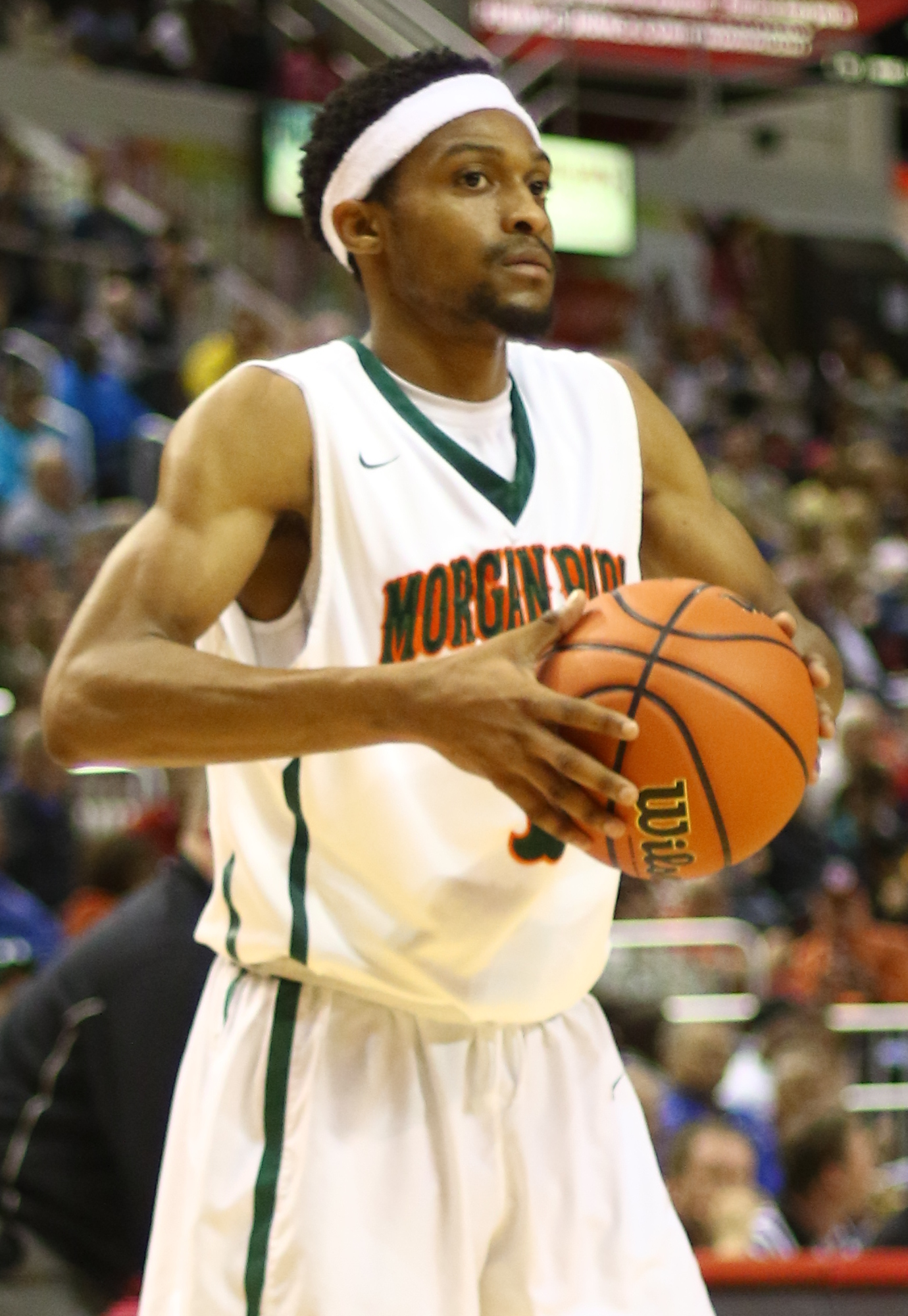
- LoVett with Morgan Park High School in 2015

Shanghai Blackbird
- Position: Point guard / shooting guard
- League: National Basketball League

Personal information
- Born: March 4, 1996 (age 30) Fort Wayne, Indiana, U.S.A
- Listed height: 6 ft 0 in (1.83 m)
- Listed weight: 180 lb (82 kg)

Career information
- High school: Providence (Burbank, California); San Gabriel Academy (San Gabriel, California); Morgan Park (Chicago, Illinois)
- College: St. John's (2016–2018)
- NBA draft: 2019: undrafted
- Playing career: 2018–present

Career history
- 2018–2019: Sloboda Užice
- 2020: Semt77 Yalovaspor
- 2020–2021: Ovarense Basquetebol
- 2021–2022: Vilpas Vikings
- 2022–2024: Sporting CP
- 2024: Henan Golden Elephants
- 2024: Tianjin Pioneers
- 2025: Shijiazhuang Xianglan
- 2025–2026: Nanjing Monkey Kings
- 2026–present: Shanghai Blackbird

Career highlights
- Big East All-Rookie Team (2017)

Marcus LoVett Jr. (born March 4, 1996) is an American professional basketball player for the Shanghai Blackbird of the National Basketball League (NBL). He played college basketball for the St. John's Red Storm.

== High school career ==
LoVett grew up in Fort Wayne, Indiana but moved to California prior to high school. LoVett began his high school career at Providence High School. As a freshman, he led all freshmen in scoring average at 31.7 points per game, while also averaging 4.6 rebounds, 3.4 assists and 3.1 steals per game. LoVett posted six 40-point outings, including a season-high 57-point game in a win over St. Joseph. He was named All-Area Boys’ Basketball Player of the Year as well as Liberty League and CIF Southern Section Division V-A Player of the Year honors. Prior to his junior season, he enrolled at San Gabriel Academy after considering attending Orangewood Academy.

LoVett transferred to Morgan Park High School in Chicago for his senior season. He led the team to the Class 3A state semifinals, losing to Althoff despite posting 45 points. LoVett averaged 25 points, eight rebounds and seven assists per game as a senior. He was considered a four-star recruit ranked 62nd in the nation by Rivals.com. On May 21, 2015, LoVett signed with St. John's, choosing the Red Storm over offers from Memphis, Illinois, DePaul, Pittsburgh, UNLV, Kansas, and San Diego State.

== College career ==
LoVett was forced to redshirt his true freshman season as a partial academic qualifier. He scored a career-high 32 points against Xavier on January 7, 2017. As a redshirt freshman, he averaged 15.9 points and 3.8 assists per game, and helped St. John's to a six-win improvement. LoVett was a unanimous selection to the All-Big East rookie team. He contemplated turning professional after the season but decided to return to school. On November 26, 2017, LoVett sustained an MCL sprain in his left knee but was listed as day-to-day. However, on January 10, 2018, he announced he was sidelined for the remainder of the season, without playing since the injury. LoVett averaged 14.9 points and 2.1 steals per game in seven games. In February 2018, LoVett announced he was leaving St. John's to pursue a professional career.

== Professional career ==
LoVett joined Aquila Basket Trento of the Lega Basket Serie A (LBA) for training camp and played five preseason games for the club. On September 18, 2018, he moved to another LBA club, Dinamo Sassari, for the remainder of the preseason. On November 9, 2018, LoVett signed with Sloboda Užice of the Basketball League of Serbia (KLS). In 18 games, he averaged 20.6 points, 4.3 assists and 3.1 rebounds per game, ranking second in the league in scoring. LoVett was an All-KLS honorable mention selection by basketball website Eurobasket.com.

On July 6, 2020, LoVett joined Semt77 Yalovaspor of the Turkish Basketball First League (TBL). He subsequently joined Ovarense Basquetebol of the Portuguese Basketball League and averaged 21.7 points, 4.5 assists, 3.2 rebounds, and 1.9 steals per game. On June 9, 2021, LoVett signed with the Vilpas Vikings of the Korisliiga.

LoVett played 17 games for Henan Golden Elephants in 2024 National Basketball League (NBL) season. He joined Tianjin Pioneers for 2024–25 Chinese Basketball Association (CBA) season.

== Personal life ==
LoVett's father, Marcus LoVett Sr. played basketball at Oklahoma City University and helped the team win the 1996 NAIA Division I men's basketball tournament.
