= Westmark =

Westmark may refer to:

- Westmark (novel), a fantasy novel written by Lloyd Alexander
- Reichsgau Westmark, a planned Reichsgau of Nazi Germany, that included the former Territory of the Saar Basin, the Bavarian Palatinate and after 1940 the French département of Moselle in Lorraine (Lothringen)
- The Westmark School, a high school in Encino, California
- The «West Mark» or «West German Mark», an unofficial designation for the Deutsche Mark before the German Reunification of 1990.
- Westmark (name), a Swedish surname also popular in Finland and Denmark.
- Westmark Township, Phelps County, Nebraska, a township in Nebraska, USA
- Westmark hotel chain operating in Alaska and the Yukon, a division of Holland America Line.
