= Ambassador League =

High school athletic league in California, USA

The Ambassador League is a high school athletic league that is part of the CIF Southern Section. Members are independent Christian schools located in Riverside County and San Bernardino County.

== Members ==
As of the 2019–2020 season:

- Aquinas High School
- Arrowhead Christian Academy
- Desert Christian Academy
- Linfield Christian School
- Woodcrest Christian High School
- Ontario Christian High School
- Western Christian High School
