= Omega League =

High school athletic league in California

The Omega League is a high school athletic conference that is affiliated with the CIF Southern Section. Members are primarily small independent schools in Los Angeles and Ventura counties. The league sponsors eight-man football.

== Members ==
- AGBU Manoukian High School, Pasadena
- Highland Hall Waldorf School, Northridge
- Hillcrest Christian School, Thousand Oaks
- Lighthouse Christian Academy, Santa Monica
- Newbury Park Adventist Academy, Newbury Park
- Ojai Valley School, Ojai
- Pilgrim School, Los Angeles
- San Fernando Valley Academy, Northridge
- Santa Clarita Valley International School, Castaic
- Summit View School, North Hollywood
- Westmark School, Encino
- Glendale Adventist Academy, Glendale
