= Condor League =

US secondary school athletic conference

The Condor League is a secondary school athletic conference that is affiliated with the CIF Southern Section. The members are preparatory schools located along the Central Coast of California.

School	Location	Type	Website	Nickname
Besant Hill School of Happy Valley	Ojai, California	Boarding school	www.besanthill.org	Coyotes
Garden Street Academy	Santa Barbara, California	Independent school	www.gardenstreetacademy.org	Comets
Midland School	Los Olivos, California	Boarding school	www.midland-school.org	Mighty Oaks
Oak Grove School	Ojai, California	Boarding school	www.oakgroveschool.com	Lizards
Providence High School	Santa Barbara, California	Private school	www.providencesb.org/athletics	Patriots
