= Erik Audé =

American actor

- Born: Erik Anthony Audé; April 5, 1980 (age 46); Los Angeles, California, U.S.
- Occupations: Actor, stuntman, poker player Married to actress Erin O’Brien
- Known for: Imprisonment in Pakistan for drug trafficking

Erik Anthony Audé (born April 5, 1980) is an American actor, stuntman, restaurateur, and professional poker player who was arrested and imprisoned in Pakistan for alleged drug trafficking. Audé maintains that he was duped into carrying opium and believed he was importing leather goods.

Audé's experiences were adapted into a 2013 episode of the National Geographic television series Locked Up Abroad, and also into the 2018 documentary film 3 Years in Pakistan: The Erik Audé Story. He appears as himself in both works.

== History ==
Audé was born in Los Angeles, California. He attended Bethel Christian School in Lancaster, California, and played American football there.

In 2002, Audé was persuaded to carry leather samples from Islamabad, Pakistan, to the United States by Razmik Minasian (who used the alias Rai Gharizian), an Armenian client at the gymnasium where Audé was employed. Minasian concealed from Audé the fact that the case containing leather skirts and jackets also contained opium. On February 15, 2002, Audé was arrested at Islamabad International Airport after being found, according to Pakistani authorities, with 3.6 kilograms (7.9 pounds) of opium in the process of embarking on his scheduled flight to Dubai, United Arab Emirates.

Pakistan is not a party to the United States' Prison Transfer Treaty program. The actor, convicted in January 2003, began serving a sentence of seven years at the Adiala Central Jail in nearby Rawalpindi. At the time, a number of articles in the press speculated on the odds of his surviving the full term of his seven-year sentence.

Audé's 2004 release followed an appeal by New Mexico Governor Bill Richardson just before Christmas, and followed Minasian's written confession that Audé was innocent of knowing he was being used to smuggle opium. A number of websites were set up to help promote his cause, and to document the struggle to free him. The actor arrived at Los Angeles International Airport on December 26, 2004, after entering the United States at Chicago's O'Hare International Airport. As of 2009 Audé lives in the San Fernando Valley.

== Filmography ==
Year(s)	Work	Role	Notes
1997	The Bold and the Beautiful	Travis Bayer	TV series
1997	Hiller and Diller	Barry	TV series
1998	One World	Rick	TV series
1998	Sorrow's Child	Cop	Short
1998	Sports Theater with Shaquille O'Neal	'Cannibal' Hannibal	TV series
1999	Inferno	Soldier	Film
1998–1999	Cousin Skeeter	Duke	TV series
1999	City Guys	Signing Guy	TV series
2000	Zoe, Duncan, Jack and Jane	Norb Schaffer	TV series
2000	Providence	Jason	TV series
2000	Bounce	Prom Boy	Film
2000	7th Heaven	Boy Friend	TV series
2000	Dude, Where's My Car?	Musclehead	Film
2001	The Andy Dick Show	Intense Guy	TV series
2001	Three Sisters	Party Guest	TV series
2001	Popular	Frat Guy	TV series
2001	10 Attitudes	Travis	Film
2001	So Little Time		TV series
2001	That's Life	Pete	TV series
2001	The Nightmare Room	Frank	TV series
2001	Reba	Football Player	TV series
2001	Thieves	Hank	TV series
2002	Van Wilder	Martial Arts Freshman	Film
2003	That's So Raven	Student #1	TV series
2004	Blind Passion	Vinnie	Film
2005	Cold Case	Frat Guy	TV series
2005	The Rites of Nico	Wayne	Short
2006	The Cutting Edge: Going for the Gold	Pool Waiter	Video
2006	Miles from Home	Landlord	Film
2006	Courting Alex	Mark	TV series
2006	So Notorious	Bad Date #1	TV series
2006	Just for Kicks	Lance	TV series
2006	Poseidon	Bouncer	Film
2006	Beyond the Break	Scott Worthington	TV series
2006	Just Legal	Boyfriend	TV series
2006	CSI: NY	Jewelry Store Manager	TV series
2006	Flags of Our Fathers	Officer	Film
2006	Shark	Seth Taylor	TV series
2006	Numbers	Steroid Highschool Kid	TV series
2007	Cory in the House	Sebastian	TV series
2007	The Third Nail	Marine Lieutenant	Film
2009	Fatal Secrets	Mike	Film
2010	Q for Death	Officer Clayton Banks	Video
2010	Baby	Dream Dad	Short
2010	A Mother's Choice	Dr. Desmond	Short
2011	The Event	Mark	TV series
2011	The Young and the Restless	Passport Forger	TV series
2011	Rizzoli & Isles	Devon Bosko	TV series
2011	CSI: Crime Scene Investigation	Ryan Dempsey	TV series
2011	Cowboys & Indians	Gentleman James Carter	Film
2011	Heroine Legends: Agent Files	Jones	TV series
2012	The ABCs of Death	Beat Down Dude	Film
2012	A Mother's Choice: The Ultimatum	Dr. Desmond	Short
2012	NCIS: Los Angeles	Burly Surfer	TV series
2012	Parenthood	Construction Worker #2	TV series
2012	Betrayal	Collin	Short
2012	Jew	Bufford	Short
2013	Shadow on the Mesa	Thor Welsh	TV movie
2013	The Devil's Dozen		Film
2012–2013	Partners	Bartender	TV series
2013	My Haunted House	Ghost Husband	TV series
2013	Nothing Left But Tears	Wrath	Short
2013	Mike India Alpha	Jeremy Mitchell	Short
2013	Ad Lucem	Biker	Video short
2013	Unidentified		Film
2013	To My Future Assistant	Hank	TV movie
2013	Three and a Half Songs	Luke	Short
2013	The Pain Killers	Roman	Film
2013	Halfway to Hell	Roach	Film
2014	HorrorCon	Dane Harding	Film
2014	Legends	Security Captain	TV series
2014	Looking for Lions	Jamal	Film
2014	Sons of Anarchy	White Guard	TV series
2014	American Sniper	Thompson	Film
2014	The Eric Andre Show	Nascar Driver	TV series
2015	Gnome Alone	Officer Kelly	Film
2015	Evil Within	Robert	Film
2015	Bout to be a Riot	Darren Wilson	Video short
2015	Shameless	Drug Cop	TV series
2015	NCIS	Man in Blue Suit	TV series
2015	Field of Lost Shoes	Hawker	Film
2015	All That Matters	Neil	TV series
2015	Rendezvous with Victory	Terrorist VO	TV series short
2015	Tornado Alley	Dale	TV series
2015	Seat of Justice	Officer Clayton Banks	Film
2015	A Killer of Men	Cutler	Short
2015	The Last Ship	Avocet Worker 2	TV series
2015	Checkmate	Officer Williams	Film
2015	Hand of God	Cop #1	TV series
2015	Being Charlie	Staffer #1	Film
2010–2015	Days of Our Lives	Lamar/Thug/Dealer	TV series
2015	Luke	Bouncer 1	TV movie
2015	Luke	Bouncer 1	TV series
