= Orange League =

High school athletic league in California

The Orange League is a high school athletic league that is part of the CIF Southern Section. Members are located around Santa Ana. Despite its name, no members are located in Orange, California.

== Members ==
- Anaheim High School
- Century High School
- Magnolia High School
- Santa Ana Valley High School
- Savanna High School
- Western High School
