= Fili Moala =

American football player (born 1985)

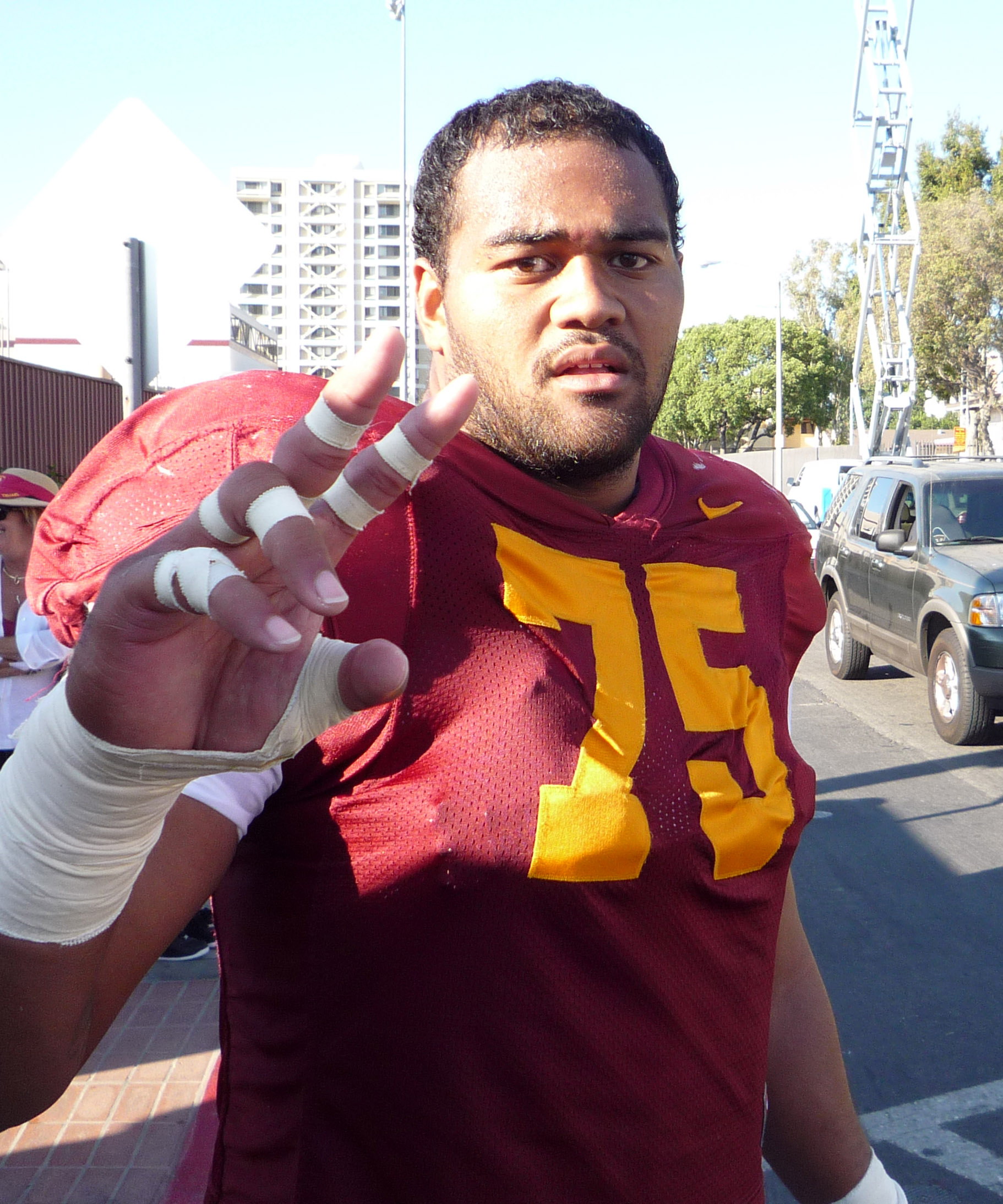
- Moala flashing the "Fight On" sign after a 2008 fall practice

No. 95
- Position: Defensive end

Personal information
- Born: June 23, 1985 (age 41); Buena Park, California, U.S.
- Listed height: 6 ft 4 in (1.93 m)
- Listed weight: 308 lb (140 kg)

Career information
- High school: Western (Anaheim, California)
- College: USC (2004–2008)
- NFL draft: 2009: 2nd round, 56th overall pick

Career history
- Indianapolis Colts (2009–2014); Houston Texans (2015)*
- * Offseason or practice squad member only

Awards and highlights
- Second-team All-American (2008); First-team All-Pac-10 (2008)

Career NFL statistics
- Total tackles: 88
- Sacks: 3.5
- Pass deflections: 3
- Stats at Pro Football Reference

Siaosi Toutoupau'u "Fili" Moala (born June 23, 1985) is an American former professional football player who was a defensive end in the National Football League (NFL). He played college football for the USC Trojans, and was selected by the Indianapolis Colts in the second round of the 2009 NFL draft.

== Early life ==
Moala was the only son in a five-child family and was not permitted by his mother to play football until high school; however he did participate in basketball and baseball. Moala played high school football at Western High School in Anaheim, California, where he was teammates with Mike Iupati. As a senior in 2002 he was a Super Prep All-Farwest, Prep Star All-West, Tom Lemming All-West and Tacoma News Tribune Western 100 selection.

== College career ==
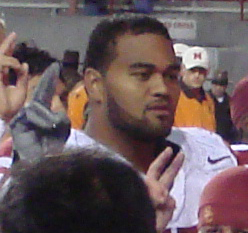
Moala celebrates a victory during the 2007 season

Moala originally signed with the University of Southern California in 2003, but did not qualify for admission. He attended Cypress College for one year, but did not play football there, before transferring into USC. During his first year at USC in 2004 he was redshirted. In 2005 he started two games for the Trojans recording eight tackles.

During his sophomore season in 2006, Moala pushed for and eventually won the starting spot, starting the last seven games and received All-Pac-10 honorable mention. He finished the season with 20 tackles, 2 1/2 sacks, and one fumble recovery. As a junior in 2007 he started all 13 games recording 33 tackles, 2 1/2 sacks, and was an All-Pac-10 honorable mention.

With the departure of top-10 draft pick defensive tackle Sedrick Ellis, Moala was expected to step up on the Trojans' defensive line in the 2008 season. In the off-season and into the beginning of the 2008 season, Moala suffered from back spasms that limited his time in practices; he did not register a tackle during the 52–7 rout against the Trojans' first opponent, Virginia, which ran a spread offense that did not emphasize the run. Moala showed marked improvements in the following game against Ohio State, where he made a sack and contributed to a defensive line that had 6 1/2 tackles for losses, including five sacks. Moala had a strong game against Arizona State, where he made three tackles, recovered a fumble, and blocked two third-quarter field goal attempts, tying the NCAA record for blocked field goals in a quarter.

== Professional career ==
=== Pre-draft ===
Entering his senior season, Moala began receiving heavy media attention as one of the best defensive linemen going into the season and a potential top-2009 NFL Draft pick in early mock drafts, with ESPN's draft expert Todd McShay naming him a possible first pick.

He was considered one of the best defensive tackle prospects for the 2009 NFL draft. However, durability concerns let him slip to the second round.

Pre-draft measurables
| Height | Weight | 40-yard dash | 10-yard split | 20-yard split | Vertical jump | Broad jump | Bench press |
|---|---|---|---|---|---|---|---|
| 6 ft 4 in (1.93 m) | 305 lb (138 kg) | 5.07 s | 1.69 s | 2.90 s | 30 1/2 in (0.77 m) | 8 ft 4 in (2.54 m) | 25 reps |
All values from NFL Combine (no 20-ss, 3-cone because of left groin strain).

=== Indianapolis Colts ===
Moala was selected by the Indianapolis Colts in the second round of the 2009 NFL draft.

Moala re-signed with the Colts to a one-year contract on March 4, 2013. He re-signed with the Colts again on March 10, 2014.

=== Houston Texans ===
On August 19, 2015, Moala signed a one-year contract with the Houston Texans.

== Personal life ==
Three of Moala's cousins have played at either Oregon State or Oregon: Tevita Moala (Oregon State, 1999–2000), Haloti Ngata (Oregon, 2002–2005), and Eric Moala (Oregon State, 2005–2006).
