= San Joaquin League =

Defunct high school athletic league

The San Joaquin League was a high school athletic league that was part of the CIF Southern Section. It was dissolved after the 2013–14 season, most of the schools moving to the Santa Cruz League.

== Former members ==
Former members of the league included:

- Eastside Christian High School
- Fairmont Preparatory Academy
- Saddleback Valley Christian High School
- Southland Christian High School
- Tarbut V' Torah
