= Bethel Christian School (California) =

Coordinates: 34.6738°N 118.1863°W

- Lancaster, California

Information
- Grades: Toddler-8th Grade
- Athletics conference: Agape League
- Accreditation: Association of Christian Schools International (ACSI); Western Association of Schools and Colleges (WASC); National Association for the Education of Young Children

Bethel Christian School (BCS) is a private, Baptist, Toddler-8th Grade Christian school in Lancaster, California.

The school was established in 1979. At that time, the school, with 67 students and four teachers, used all of the facilities of the 4-acre (1.6 ha) church campus; the classrooms were initially located in Building 100. Building 200, the second phase of the school, was completed by September 1980. At that time the school had 150 students. The church and school purchased 5 acres (2.0 ha) of land adjacent to the original property, expanding the size of the property to 9 acres (3.6 ha). The church and school also acquired additional modular buildings, allowing expansion. The first senior class, consisting of six students, graduated in June 1989. In the 1990s BCS grew to well over 600 students.

Bethel Christian School is accredited by the Association of Christian Schools International (ACSI), the Western Association of Schools and Colleges (WASC), and by the National Association for the Education of Young Children (NAEYC).

== Campus ==
The property of the Bethel Church and School is on a 9-acre (3.6 ha) plot of land. As of 2012 Building 100 houses the administration. The school has 40,000 square feet (3,700 m^{2}) of classroom space, two playgrounds, one ball field, one gymnasium, multi-purpose facilities, and offices.

== Notable alumni ==
- Erik Audé (class of 1998) - Actor, played high school football
