= Serra League =

The Serra League was a high school athletic league in California. It was a member of the CIF Southern Section. In 2013 MaxPreps named the Serra League the second toughest football league in the state after the Trinity League.

== Members ==
School	Nickname	City
Notre Dame High School	Knights	Sherman Oaks
Bishop Alemany High School	Warriors	Mission Hills
Bishop Amat Memorial High School	Lancers	La Puente
Loyola High School	Cubs	Los Angeles
Crespi Carmelite High School	Celts	Encino
