= Liberty League (California) =

High school athletic conference

The Liberty League is a high school athletic conference in Los Angeles County, California affiliated with the CIF Southern Section.

== Schools ==
As of 2013, the schools in the league are:

- Archer School for Girls
- Buckley School
- Glendale Adventist Academy
- Holy Martyrs Armenian School
- Milken Community High School
- New Community Jewish High School
- Oakwood School
- Pacifica Christian School
- Providence High School
- Yeshiva University of Los Angeles High School
