= Savannah Levin =

American soccer player (born 1995)

Personal information
- Full name: Savannah Lee Levin
- Date of birth: May 21, 1995 (age 31).
- Place of birth: Newport Coast, California, U.S.
- Height: 5 ft 3 in (1.60 m)
- Position: Defender

College career
| Years | Team | Apps | (Gls) |
| 2013–2016 | USC Trojans | 86 | (4) |

Senior career*
| Years | Team | Apps | (Gls) |
| 2017 | Kopparbergs/Göteborg FC | 11 | (0) |
- * Club domestic league appearances and goals as of July 3, 2017

Savannah Lee Levin (born May 21, 1995) is an American soccer player who played as a defender for Kopparbergs/Göteborg FC in the Swedish Damallsvenskan. She played for the USC Trojans women's soccer team from 2013 to 2016, winning the 2016 NCAA Division I Women's Soccer Tournament.

== Early life ==
Levin's parents are Desmond and Diane Levin. She has a brother, Jay, and an older sister, Camille Levin, who played soccer for the Stanford Cardinal women's soccer team and professionally. She grew up in Newport Coast, California.

== Soccer career ==
In 2012, Levin played for Cal South's team that won the Olympic Development Program national championships in Frisco, Texas.

In high school Levin was named league MVP in soccer all four years at Tarbut V' Torah (class of 2013) in Irvine, California, where she was a four-time first team all-league selection.

Levin played on the USA Women's Soccer Team at the 2013 Maccabiah Games in Israel.

Levin played at the University of Southern California (USC) from 2013 to 2016, where she was part of the USC Trojans women's soccer team that won the 2016 NCAA Division I Women's Soccer Tournament. As a sophomore in 2014 and as a junior in 2015 she earned Pac-12 All-Academic honorable mention. In 2016 she was named All Pac-12 First Team. She majored in psychology.

Levin declared for the 2017 NWSL College Draft but was not selected, in February 2017 she signed with Swedish team Kopparbergs/Göteborg FC to play in the Damallsvenskan, for whom she played as a midfielder in 2017.

In 2018 she was inducted into the Southern California Jewish Sports Hall of Fame.

== Honors ==
USC Trojans

- NCAA Division I Women's Soccer Championship: 2016
