= Aquinas High School (California) =

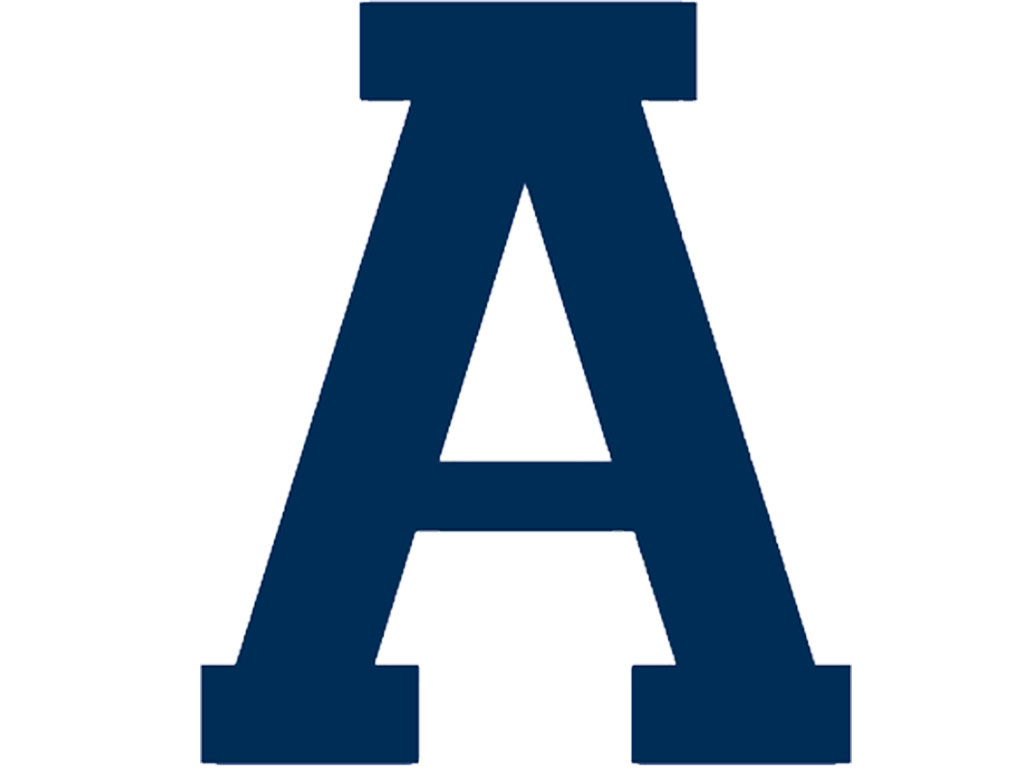

Location
- 2772 Sterling Avenue; San Bernardino, (San Bernardino County), California 92404; 34°8′32″N 117°14′39″W

Information
- Type: Private, Coeducational
- Motto: Lux et Veritas (Light and Truth)
- Religious affiliation: Roman Catholic
- Established: 1955
- CEEB code: 052772
- President: Dr. Chris Barrows
- Principal: Dr. Amanda Egan
- Grades: 9-12
- Enrollment: 665 (2025-26)
- Student to teacher ratio: 14:1
- Campus: Suburban/City
- Campus size: 28 acres (110,000 m^{2})
- Colors: Navy, white, and grey
- Athletics conference: Ambassador League
- Mascot: Falcon
- Team name: Falcons
- Rival: Notre Dame (Riverside)
- Accreditation: Western Association of Schools and Colleges, Western Catholic Educational Association
- Publication: The Dumb Ox
- Newspaper: The Falconer
- Yearbook: The Summa
- Tuition: $8,600 (2024-25)
- Website: www.aquinashs.net

Aquinas High School is a private, coeducational, Roman Catholic high school in San Bernardino, California, United States. The school is located in and operated by the Roman Catholic Diocese of San Bernardino.

Aquinas is accredited by the Western Association of Schools and Colleges and the Western Catholic Educational Association. The Aquinas student experiences a traditional liberal arts curriculum that requires the pursuit of the college preparatory disciplines. The school works energetically to keep tuition affordable in the face of increasing costs each year. The school is deeply concerned that Catholic education is available to all students who could benefit and fulfill entrance requirements, without regard to the financial status of their household.

== Campus ==
The school's 27-acre campus in located in a residential neighborhood north of the Foothill Freeway (SR 210) between the Del Rosa and Highland Avenue exits.

There are 10 buildings, consisting of 24 classrooms, 3 science labs, 1 computer lab, library, chapel, school store, snack bar and counselors' offices, administrative and student support spaces. Athletic facilities include a gymnasium, 350 seat performing arts center, football stadium with synthetic track, 2 locker rooms, tennis courts, and softball, baseball and soccer fields.

== History ==
On June 15, 1954, Bishop Charles F. Buddy of the Diocese of San Diego (of which San Bernardino was then a part) announced Aquinas Hall would open the following academic year as a boys' Catholic high school. The school opened in 1955 with forty-nine freshmen. Bishop Buddy blessed the new facility on November 11, 1955. St. Bernadine's High School was an all-girl school, which closed its doors on its 50th anniversary in 1971. Its student body merged with Aquinas Hall, forming the co-educational Aquinas High School.

In the spring of 2006 the football field was refurbished, bringing in a new playing surface and lighting. A new fence, entry walls, student drop-off area, and landscaping were completed in 2006. This was followed by the construction of the Fr. Devine Tennis Center. This facility provided Aquinas with six lit courts for their league champion Lady Falcon tennis team. Other improvements include the remodeling of the Bill Lemann Baseball Complex, the Lady Falcon softball field, the renovation of the quad area, and remodels of most of the restrooms on campus.

The 2011–2012 school year saw the dedication of the Rezek Student Center and the Matich Science Center. Both facilities allow students the use of technology to enhance their educational experience. 2017 saw the opening of the San Manuel Performing Arts Center, a 350-seat state-of-the-art live performance venue and the Lemann Leadership Center. Theses two new facilities created a new administration office as well as new public entrance to the school. That year also saw the opening of the refurbished Aquinas-Gogo Gymnasium. The remodel includes The Jack Henley Hall of Champions. This area serves as a new lobby to the gym as well as space to celebrate the school's athletic achievements.

In the fall of 2022 the school saw the completion of a completely remodeled Rezek Student Center. 2023 marked a major milestone in the history of the campus. This began with the opening of the Rezek-Aquinas Beach Stadium, creating an on-campus home for the Lady Falcons Beach Volleyball team. The center of the campus underwent a major shift in its function. The outdoor basketball court became a new student plaza complete with an additional snack bar, ample outdoor seating, a large fountain, and a 40 ft clock tower which can be heard throughout the campus. The plaza leads to two new buildings; the Janice Lemann Center for Visual Arts and the Steinmann Family Center for Innovation. Through the buildings is a new entrance to Reisch Stadium.

== Academics ==
Aquinas offers 24 AP courses and 15 honors courses. The school is also known for its pre-professional academies. These are divided into several fields including; healthcare, law, engineering, and visual and performing arts. The visual and performing arts academy consists of four "strands". These are visual arts, digital arts, musical arts, and performing arts.

== Athletics ==
Since the inception of the Falcon sports program Aquinas has maintained a consistent level of success, in particular the boys' basketball, football, boys' soccer, softball, and baseball teams. In the summer of 2017 Aquinas was chosen as an official Nike school which allowed for the outfitting of the Falcon athletic teams exclusively in Nike apparel. 2022 saw Aquinas end its association with Nike and reach an agreement with Adidas to become the official outfitter of Aquinas Athletics. Aquinas athletic teams have won over 140 league championships, 11 CIF championships, and 3 state championships.

Football – 1958, 1960, 1962, 1964, 1968, 1979, 1981, 1985, 2005, 2007, 2008, 2009, 2010, 2016, 2017, 2018, 2019, 2021, 2022, 2023, 2024, 2025, 2026

- CIF Champions 2000, 2005, 2017, 2019, 2021
- CIF Runner-Up 2016
- State South Region Champions 2019, 2021
- State South Region Runner-Up 2017
- State Champions 2005
- State Runner-Up 2019, 2021

Girls' Volleyball – 1999, 2000, 2012, 2013

Girls' Tennis – 1982, 1983, 1984, 2004, 2005, 2006, 2011, 2015, 2016, 2017, 2019

- CIF Runner-Up 2005, 2010

Boys' Water Polo - 2025

Boys' Basketball – 1960, 1962, 1963, 1964, 1966, 1968, 1969, 1970, 1971, 1972, 1973, 1980, 1983, 1984, 1988, 2008, 2009, 2010, 2020, 2021, 2023, 2024

- CIF Champions 1973, 2021, 2025
- CIF Runner-Up 1968, 1969, 2020
- State South Region Champions 2021
- State Champions 2021

Girls' Basketball – 1983, 1992, 1993, 2001, 2014, 2015, 2016, 2017, 2018, 2026

Boys' Soccer – 1982, 1983, 1988, 1989, 1993, 1995, 1996, 1997, 1998, 1999, 2018, 2021, 2022

- CIF Champions 1998, 2018

Girls' Soccer – 1990

Wrestling – 1979, 1984, 1985

Baseball – 1959, 1963, 1964, 1965, 1966, 1968, 1969, 1970, 1979, 1980, 1981, 1982, 1983, 1984, 1985, 1986, 1987, 1988, 1990, 1997, 2021, 2022, 2023, 2024, 2025, 2026

Softball – 1983, 1985, 2009, 2010, 2011, 2012, 2013, 2014, 2015, 2017, 2018, 2019, 2021, 2022, 2023, 2024, 2025, 2026

- CIF Champions 2013
- State Champions 2013

Boys' Swimming - 2021, 2025, 2026

- CIF Champions 2026

Girls' Swimming - 2025

- CIF Runner-Up - 2025

Boys' Volleyball - 2026

Golf – 1983, 1984, 2000, 2009

Boys' Tennis - 2021, 2024

Boys' Track – 1958, 1988, 2003, 2004, 2005, 2022

Girls' Track – 2003, 2004

Girls' Cross Country – 2009, 2010

== Notable alumni ==
- Rod Pacheco, district attorney and politician
- Chris Parker, American football player
- Eric Bitonti, infielder and former 3rd round pick for the Milwaukee Brewers
- Nathan Christman, former pitcher for the Oregon Ducks baseball team
- Mason Greenhouse, outfielder for the Miami Hurricanes baseball team
- Chase Davidson, outfielder for the Colorado Mesa University baseball team
- Landon Young, infielder for the Washington Huskies baseball team, formerly played for the TCU Horned Frogs baseball team.
