= Camille Ashton =

American soccer player (born 1990)

Camille Levin Ashton
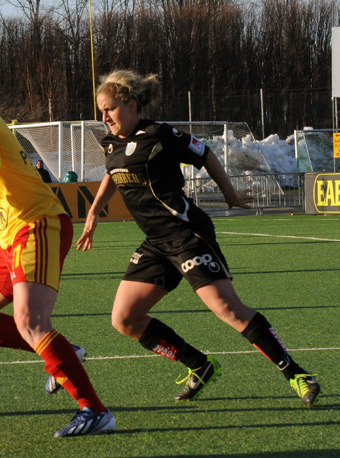
- Levin defends against a Tyreso player during the 2013 Svenska Supercupen on April 1, 2013

Personal information
- Full name: Camille Levin Ashton
- Birth name: Camille Tayla Levin
- Date of birth: April 24, 1990 (age 36)
- Place of birth: California, U.S.
- Height: 5 ft 3 in (1.60 m)
- Position: Defender

Youth career
- Slammers FC '89

College career
Years	Team	Apps	(Gls)
2008–2011	Stanford Cardinal		

Senior career*
Years	Team	Apps	(Gls)
2012	Pali Blues	8	(0)
2012–2013	Kopparbergs/Göteborg FC	14	(0)
2013–2014	Western Sydney Wanderers	4	(0)
2014–2015	Sky Blue FC	42	(0)
2015	→ Fiorentina (loan)	8	(0)
2016–2017	Orlando Pride	10	(0)
2017	Houston Dash	22	(0)
2018	Vålerenga	12	(0)

International career^{‡}
2009	United States U-20	4	(0)
2012–2013	United States U-23	9	(0)
- * Club domestic league appearances and goals as of May 21, 2019 ‡ National team caps and goals as of February 24, 2014

Camille Levin Ashton (born Camille Tayla Levin; April 24, 1990) is an American former professional soccer defender and the current general manager of the NWSL club San Diego Wave FC.

Levin Ashton played for the Stanford Cardinal women's soccer team that won the 2011 NCAA Division I Women's Soccer Tournament. She last played for Vålerenga in the Toppserien and in 2013 was the captain of the United States U-23 women's national soccer team.

== Early life ==
Levin Ashton was born in California to Desmond and Diane Levin, both from South Africa, and is Jewish. She has two younger siblings, Jay and Savannah Levin; the latter played for the USC Trojans women's soccer team that won the 2016 NCAA Division I Women's Soccer Tournament.

Levin Ashton attended Tarbut V'Torah Community Day School, a Jewish school in Irvine, California, where she played on a co-ed team for at least one season and was named to the NSCAA All-America team in 2006 and 2007. With the Cal South Olympic Development Program (ODP) '90 state team, Levin Ashton won the ODP national championship in 2006 as well as three regional titles. Starting from age nine through her high school years, she played club soccer for Slammers FC '89 and helped the team win three Cal South State Cups, a United States Youth Soccer Association regional championship, and two U.S. club national tournaments.

=== Stanford University ===
Levin Ashton attended Stanford University, where she played for the Stanford Cardinal from 2008 to 2011. She finished her collegiate career with 12 goals and 22 assists, having played multiple positions during her tenure.

During her freshman season, Levin Ashton served her first career assist during a match against UNC-Greensboro after dribbling the ball up the midfield and passing to Christen Press who scored the game-winning goal. She scored her first goal in the 64th minute of a match against Yale off a corner kick play from Teresa Noyola and Christen Press. Levin's goal lifted the score to 3–1 with Stanford eventually winning 4–1. She was subsequently named the Santa Clara/Adidas Classic Tournament most valuable player (MVP) and to Soccer America's team of the week.

During her sophomore season in 2009, Levin Ashton was in the starting lineup for the Cardinal during 5 of the 22 matches in which she played and was named an All-Pac-10 honorable mention. During her third season with the Cardinal, Levin Ashton was a starter in every match and played several different positions. She played as an outside left back in the first several games and then became a starting forward for most of the season. For two rounds of the NCAA tournament, she switched to central defense to fill in for an injured teammate. Playing as an attacking midfielder during the NCAA semi-finals, she scored against Boston College in the 48th minute helping lift Stanford to the finals.

Of her performance, Stanford coach Paul Ratcliffe said, "[Levin] is an incredible player. I'm so happy for today to get that big-time goal, and she deserves it. She is a player that can be one of our best forwards, one of our best forwards and one of our best backs. Wherever we need her in a given game, she's willing to go in there and make a big difference." Levin's 11 assists during her junior season tied for 20th in the nation with six of the assists occurring during consecutive matches. She was named to the NCAA College Cup All-Tournament team, and received her second All-Pac-10 honorable mention the same year.

During her final season with the Cardinal, Levin Ashton set up the game-winning goal of the 2011 NCAA College Cup final to secure Stanford's first ever NCAA championship title. Finishing her collegiate career as a highly decorated player, Levin Ashton was named to the NSCAA first-team All-America, Soccer America's MVPs first team, and the NSCAA All-Pacific Region first team. She was also named to the All-Pac-12 first team as well as the NCAA College Cup All-Tournament Team. At the 2012 ESPN ESPY Awards program, Levin Ashton accepted the Capital One Cup on behalf of the Stanford women's athletic program, which was awarded the cup as the top women's Division I athletic program.

== Club career ==
=== Pali Blues, 2012 ===
In 2012, Levin Ashton was first pick (fourth overall) by Sky Blue FC during the 2012 WPS Draft; however, the league suspended operations before the season began. Levin Ashton signed with Pali Blues in the W-League for the 2012 season and helped the team reach the league's championship game, in which it lost on penalty kicks to the Ottawa Fury.

=== Göteborg FC, 2012–13 ===
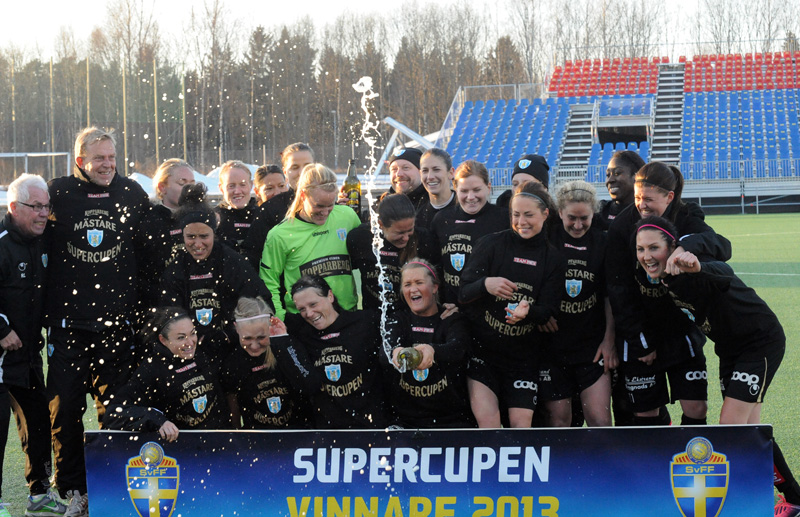
Levin (fourth from right) celebrates with Kopparbergs/Göteborg FC after winning the Supercupen in April 2013

In July 2012, Levin Ashton signed with Swedish side Kopparbergs/Göteborg FC in the Damallsvenskan, the top division of women's soccer in Sweden. She made nine starts for the club, helping clinch the Svenska Cupen. She returned to the squad in April 2013 and helped Göteborg defeat 2012 Damallsvenskan champions Tyresö FF to clinch the Svenska Supercupen. She started the first few games of the season before suffering a season ending injury.

=== Western Sydney Wanderers, 2013–14 ===
On November 30, 2013, it was announced that Levin had signed for the Western Sydney Wanderers for the remainder of the 2013–14 W-League (Australia) season. She made four appearances for the club helping the team to two shutout wins against the Newcastle Jets and Perth Glory. The Wanderers finished seventh during the 2013–14 season with a 2–3–7 record.

=== Sky Blue FC, 2014–15 ===
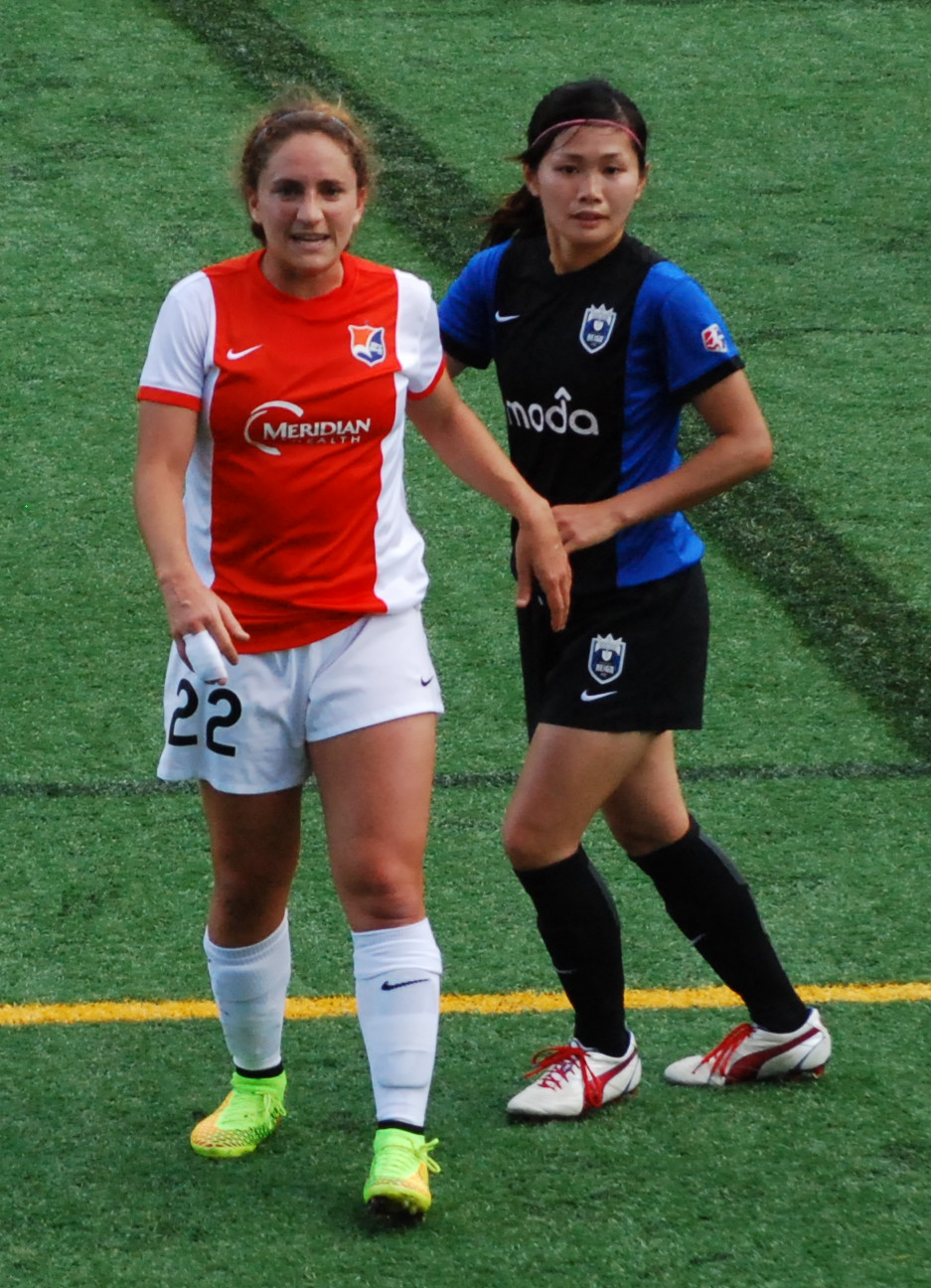
Levin (left) marks Nahomi Kawasumi in June 2014

In February 2014, it was announced that Levin had signed with Sky Blue FC for the 2014 NWSL season. Levin made 42 appearances for Sky Blue FC over the 2014 and 2015 season.

==== Fiorentina, 2015 ====
She went on loan to Fiorentina in 2015.

=== Orlando Pride, 2016–17 ===
Levin was selected by the Orlando Pride in the 2015 NWSL Expansion Draft. She made 10 appearances for Orlando in the 2016 season after missing almost half the season with an illness. On April 18, 2017, Orlando traded Levin to the Houston Dash in exchange for a third round draft pick in the 2018 NWSL College Draft.

=== Houston Dash, 2017 ===
Levin made 22 appearances for Houston in 2017. On March 20, 2018, the Houston Dash announced they had waived Levin, per her request, allowing her to play overseas.

=== Vålerenga, 2018 ===
On March 28, 2018, it was announced that Levin had signed with Vålerenga in the Toppserien in Norway. Levin appeared in 12 games for Vålerenga during the 2018 season after suffering a few injuries that disrupted her season.

On May 17, 2019, Levin announced her retirement from professional soccer.

== International career ==
Levin has represented the United States on various youth national teams. As a teenager, she played for the under-14,15, 16, under-17, and under-18 U.S. national teams. Her first experience with a junior national team came after being invited to the under-14 training camp. She played for the U.S. under-20 team during the 10 Nations Tournament as well as in matches against France and Germany during a European tour.

In 2012, Levin was a member of the under-23 women's national soccer team and helped the squad defeat Norway 5–0 to win the Four Nations Tournament in La Manga, Spain. In March 2013, she won the Four Nations Tournament with the U.S. under-23 team for a second time after defeating England 2–1. Levin served the assist on the United States' first goal of the match.

== Front office career ==
In January 2022, Ashton was hired as the general manager of the Kansas City Current. She resigned from the position in May 2024.

On June 12, 2024, Ashton was named general manager of San Diego Wave FC.

== Accolades ==
In 2015 Levin Ashton was inducted into the Southern California Jewish Sports Hall of Fame.

== Personal life ==
She married Michael Ashton in February 2022.
