= Agape League =

High school athletic league in California, USA

The Agape League is a high school athletic league affiliated with the CIF Southern Section. Most of its members are independent, Christian schools located in and around the High Desert region in Los Angeles County, San Bernardino and Riverside County. The Agape League plays Eight-man football and volleyball.

== Members ==
- Antelope Valley Christian School
- Apple Valley Christian School
- Bethel Christian School
- Hesperia Christian School
- Lucerne Valley High School
- Victor Valley Christian School
- University Careers & Sports Academy (UCSA)

== Football-only members ==
- California Lutheran Academy
- Upland Christian Academy
