= Mike Penner =

American sports journalist (1957–2009)

Mike Penner/Christine Daniels
- Born: Michael Daniel Penner; October 10, 1957; Inglewood, California, U.S.
- Died: November 27, 2009 (aged 52); Los Angeles, California, U.S.
- Other name: Christine Daniels
- Occupation: Sportswriter
- Employer: Los Angeles Times
- Spouse: Lisa Dillman (?–?)

Michael Daniel Penner (October 10, 1957 – November 27, 2009) was an American sportswriter for the Los Angeles Times. Penner self-identified as transsexual in 2007 with the new name of Christine Daniels. The following year, she detransitioned socially but died by suicide in 2009.

== Early life and education ==
Born in Inglewood, California to Russian Mennonite parents, Penner graduated from Western High School in Anaheim and from California State University, Fullerton.

== Professional career ==
Penner began her journalism career at the Anaheim Bulletin as a writer and sports editor. She then joined the Los Angeles Times in 1983 as a staff writer for the paper's Orange County edition. Initially reporting on high school sports, Penner went on to cover a variety of national and international sporting events, including the Olympics, Major League Baseball, tennis, and World Cup soccer.

=== Gender identity ===
Later in her career, in addition to covering sports, Penner began writing about transsexual identity and the process of gender transition from an autobiographical perspective. The first such piece she wrote for the Times was an essay entitled "Old Mike, New Christine", which appeared in the paper in April 2007. In it, she wrote about her lifelong struggle to come to terms with her transsexuality:

I am a transsexual sportswriter. It has taken more than 40 years, a million tears and hundreds of hours of soul-wrenching therapy for me to work up the courage to type those words. ... When you reach the point when one gender causes heartache and unbearable discomfort, and the other brings more joy and fulfillment than you ever imagined possible, it shouldn't take two tons of bricks to fall in order to know what to do.

Her wife, Lisa Dillman, submitted divorce papers on May 23, 2007, and said to Penner, "I don't even want to see you around the office unless I absolutely have to, and then I want to be as far away as possible. I don't want to be associated with it. I don't ever want to see you that way." That crushed Penner. The same week, Penner covered a press conference with Paul Oberjuerge, a writer for the San Bernardino County Sun, also in attendance. Oberjuerge mocked Penner's appearance in an article, stating "(e)xcept anyone paying any attention isn't going to be fooled — as some people are by veteran transvestites. Maybe this is cruel, but there were women in that room who were born women in body, as well as soul. And the difference between them and Christine was, in my mind, fairly stark. It seemed almost as we're all going along with someone's dress-up role-playing." Penner was deeply hurt over the comments, and a fan campaign succeeding in getting the Sun to remove the post.

Penner lived and wrote as Christine Daniels for more than a year, continuing to document his own experience with gender transition in the LA Times' blog "Woman in Progress." Daniels' writing became a source of hope for people across the country with gender-identity issues.

Shortly after her 50th birthday, Penner/Daniels went to a studio of photographer Robert Maxwell for a Vanity Fair piece. Transgender friends stated Maxwell had tried to sex Penner/Daniels up and pushed Penner/Daniels to pose provocatively. Traumatized, Penner/Daniels wrote a letter asking Vanity Fair to kill the piece.

Penner wrote as Christine Daniels from July 2007 until about March 2008; without elaboration, Penner resumed using Mike Penner in October 2008 as her byline. Penner moved in later that summer with transgender friend Amy LaCoe. LaCoe counseled Penner before her transition to Daniels and was conflicted by Penner transitioning back. Penner tore up several notebooks she kept on transgender therapy, donated her clothes and jewelry, and ceased attempts to feminize herself. He then ordered friends to call him Mike again. Though it broke her heart, LaCoe didn't judge and helped her friend with the process.

Penner repeatedly told friends her return to a male lifestyle was a last-ditch effort to reunite with Dillman, though she knew the odds were slim. Before coming out publicly, having to return to her male persona when leaving safe trans-affirming spaces would leave her incredibly distressed. Friends had noticed Penner was quiet and kept to herself previously as a man, but showed more joy and energy as Christine. Identifying as Mike again, Penner was "sullen, visibly depressed, and quiet." Later in 2008, Penner went to Metropolitan Community Church (MCC) and privately confessed to the Rev. Neil Thomas: "Don't you ever believe that I've given up being Christine." Rev. Thomas later stated, "I knew exactly what he meant. Everything about his body, everything about his fabric, everything that made him human was still screaming, that had been screaming for 40 years, that got to the point of Mike transitioning to Christine." Penner "hoped returning to Mike could possibly lead to reconciliation with Lisa," Rev. Thomas added. Penner "loved Lisa. There was no doubt about it." Penner's brother John also told LaCoe "he had never seen his brother happier than in the heyday of his life as Christine." Diana, a friend who Penner had met in a transgender support group said "Christine died of a broken heart. She wasn't confused about whether she was meant to be a woman. Any other reading of the situation is disrespectful to her memory."

Penner was a member of the Times' sports staff at the time of her death.

== Personal life ==
Penner was at one time married to fellow Los Angeles Times sportswriter Lisa Dillman although at the time of his death they were divorced.

Penner was found dead in her Los Angeles home on November 28, 2009, of an apparent suicide, a year to the day after her divorce with Dillman had been finalized. A funeral closed to media was dedicated to Mike Penner, transgender friends who'd known her were turned away at the door for not being on the guest list. Amy LaCoe was the sole transgender friend invited to the funeral. MCC had a public memorial for Christine Daniels. Since 2010, MCC has annually distributed the Christine Daniels Scholarship.

== See also ==
- List of transgender people
