= Mountain Pass League =

The Mountain Pass League is a high school athletic league that is part of the CIF Southern Section. It covers the area around the San Jacinto Valley in Riverside County, California.

== Members ==
- Citrus Hill High School
- Perris High School
- San Jacinto High School
- Tahquitz High School
- West Valley High School
- Liberty High School
