= Tarbut V' Torah =

Tarbut V'Torah Community Day School
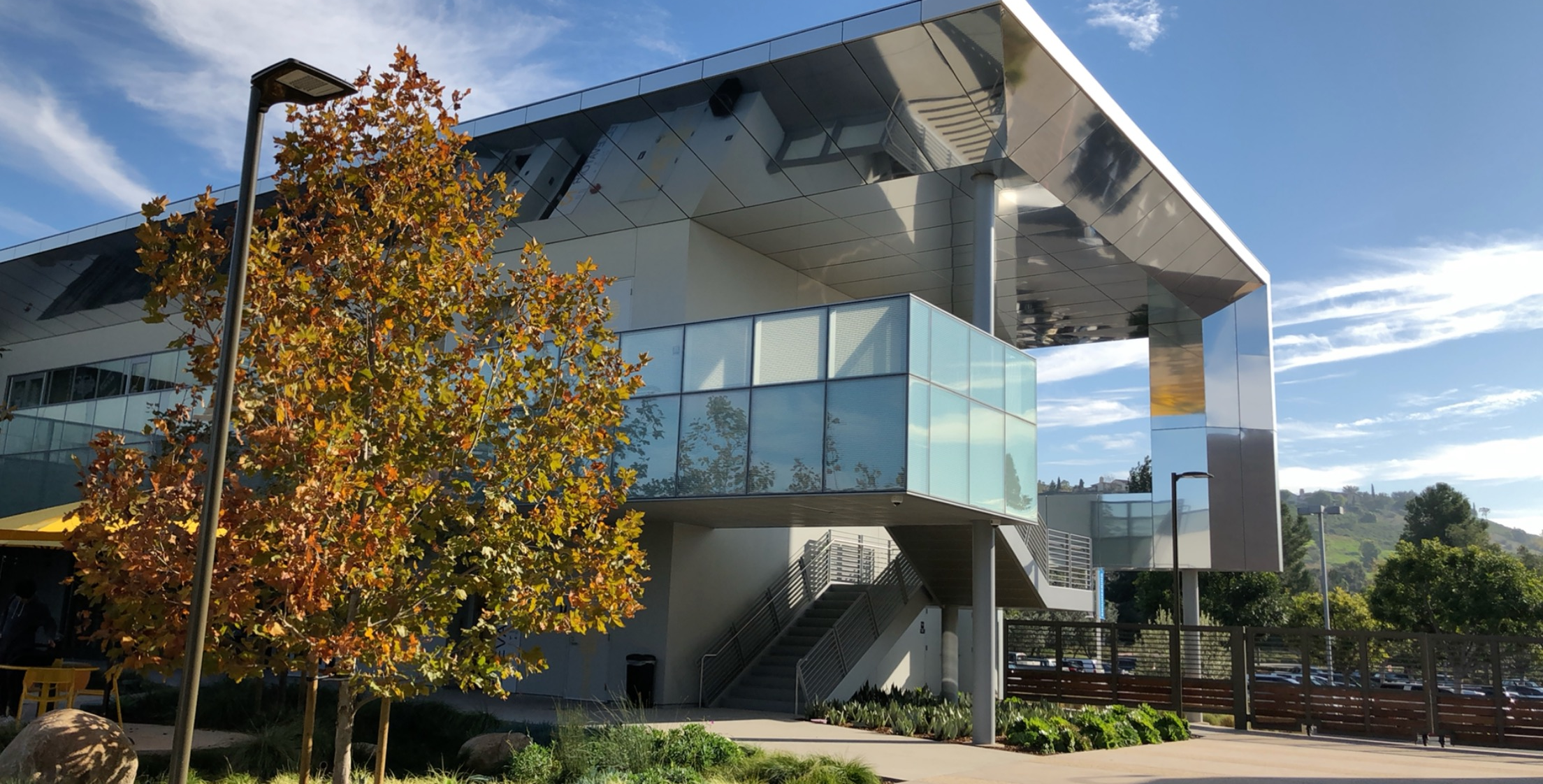
- The Tarbut V'Torah Upper School STEM Building (2018)

Location
- Irvine, Orange County, California; United States; 33°37′57″N 117°49′46″W

Information
- Type: Private
- Religious affiliation: Judaism
- Established: 1991
- Founder: Irving Gelman
- Head teacher: Mrs. Jill Quigley
- Faculty: 162
- Grades: TK-12
- Gender: Coeducational
- Enrollment: 802 (2026)
- Campus size: 21.5-acre (87,000 m^{2})
- Teams: Lions
- Website: www.tarbut.com

Tarbut V'Torah Community Day School (TVT) is a private Jewish non-denominational Community Day School located in southern Irvine, California, in northern Orange County. The school is divided into separate sections: the Lower School serves grades TK-5, and the Upper School serves grades 6-12. The schools are located on its 21.5-acre (87,000 m^{2}) campus that was donated by the Samueli family and other donors. The school has been recognized as a Blue Ribbon School.

== History ==
Founded in 1991 by Holocaust survivor Irving "Papa" Gelman, Tarbut V'Torah Community Day School (TVT), is an elementary, middle, and high school educational facility located in Irvine, California. Gelman died in 2018.

The school sits on a 10.5-acre (42,000 m^{2}) campus, opened in 1997 with more than 800 students. The school became the second Jewish school in Orange County to be cited among the 465 National Distinguished Blue Ribbon Schools in California when the designation was conferred during the 1998-1999 school year. The school graduated its first senior class in 2001.

The campus expanded the upper school in September 2002: An area of 11 acres (45,000 m^{2}) was added and a new middle and high school was constructed to accommodate increased enrollment for all grade levels. The campus encompasses 21.5 acres (87,000 m^{2}) and 150,000 square feet (14,000 m^{2}) of structures. In 2025-26, a record 836 students (grades K-12) enrolled at TVT, making it the eighth-largest Jewish Community Day School in the United States. In 2013, Tarbut V’Torah named teacher Jeffrey Davis its new chief executive. That year it had 603 students and 84 faculty members, a $13 million operating budget, and total assets of about $42 million.

The name "Tarbut" is inspired by the Tarbut schools created by the Yiddish-speaking community of pre-World War II Eastern Europe. The founder of Tarbut V'Torah, Irving Gelman, attended one of these schools. Tarbut V'Torah, translated from Hebrew, simply means culture and Torah. Tarbut schools had a curriculum that was secular and included science, humanities, and Hebrew studies, including Jewish history. Today, other Tarbut schools exist in Argentina and in Mexico, but there is no formal affiliation between either of those schools and Tarbut v'Torah.

== Athletics ==
TVT's athletics department is divided into Middle School athletics and High School athletics.

Tarbut V' Torah's middle school athletic program competes in the Tri-Way League, consisting of 10 other private schools throughout Orange County. The boys field three teams which include flag football, basketball, and soccer, while the girls compete in volleyball, basketball, and soccer.

TVT's high school athletic program has more than 10 teams. In the fall, girls compete in volleyball (ranked in Division 5) and tennis, and both boys and girls compete in cross country running. In the winter, both boys and girls compete in soccer; in addition, TVT has a winter basketball team, which is ranked in Division 5/the Express League. In the spring, boys can play tennis, baseball, swimming, and volleyball, and the girls can play in swimming and softball.

=== Girls' soccer ===
Camille Levin attended Tarbut V' Torah, where she played soccer on a co-ed team for at least one season and was named to the NSCAA All-America team in 2006 and 2007. She went on to play for the Stanford Cardinal women's soccer team that won the 2011 NCAA Division I Women's Soccer Tournament, and a career in which she in 2013 was the captain of the United States U-23 women's national soccer team.

Camille Levin's younger sister Savannah Levin (class of 2013) also played soccer for the school for four years, and was named league MVP in soccer all four years, as well as a four-time first team all-league selection. She went on to play for the USC Trojans women's soccer team that won the 2016 NCAA Division I Women's Soccer Tournament. As a sophomore in 2014 and as a junior in 2015 she earned Pac-12 All-Academic honorable mention.

Carly Malatskey, a 2016 graduate of Tarbut V’ Torah High School who attended it from kindergarten on, captained the girls' soccer team from 2013–16, and scored 73 goals in 2015-16, an Orange County record and second all-time in California Interscholastic Federation (CIF) history. With her playing the team was three-time San Joaquin League Champion (2014–16), as she was three-time San Joaquin League Player of the Year (2014–16) and led Orange County in goals each of the three years. She now plays for the Stanford Cardinal women's soccer team, with whom she has twice won the NCAA Division I Women's Soccer Tournament.

== Notable alumni ==
- Camille Levin Ashton
- Savannah Levin
