= Vistamar School =

High school in California, United States

Coordinates: 33.90475°N 118.3808°W

Information
- Established: 2005; 21 years ago
- Enrollment: 255 (2021-2022)
- Accreditation: Western Association of Schools and Colleges

Vistamar School is a private, co-educational college-preparatory high school in El Segundo in Los Angeles County, California, United States. It is accredited by the Western Association of Schools and Colleges.

== Description ==
Vistamar School provides a "focus on global studies... courses in Web design and... seminars on ethics", as well as, "critical thinking, the nature of truth, comparative religion and psychology".

The school has a 76,000-square-foot (7,100 m^{2}) building at 737 Hawaii Street in El Segundo and has remodeled a warehouse space (formerly used by DirectTV) for student use. It was reported, "Vistamar, the South Bay's newest private high school, has come a long way. In just a few short months, a giant industrial box... has been carved out, retrofitted, built up, wired and painted to create a 21st-century campus," with "striking shades of orange, green and blue... A cluster of classrooms and offices wraps around a commons area where teachers and students will be encouraged to discuss academics amid banks of computers."

In addition, the site needed, "major upgrades to bring the structure in line with seismic and fire codes. But beyond engineering upgrades, there was also the challenge to create a kid-friendly atmosphere with lively colors in rooms and corridors that promoted the philosophies of Vistamar's creators".

Annual tuition for 2023-2024 was $47,514, with 33% of students receiving financial aid. Enrollment in 2021-22 was 255 students.

Christopher Bright is Vistamar School's third Head of School.

== Curriculum ==
The Los Angeles Times reported the curriculum is based on "Experiential education... to create more well-rounded students by translating 'nonacademic skills, habits and perspectives into academic achievement' -- in other words, learning from everyday experience." At Vistamar, it includes "just about any extracurricular activity."

Vistamar offers two foreign languages: Spanish and Mandarin Chinese.

== History ==
Vistamar School opened in September 2005, "following almost four years of research, planning, fund raising and personnel recruitment".

Robert Lovelace, founder of the Los Angeles-based Value Schools, was a founder of Vistamar School. Jim Buckheit, Vistamar's first Head of School, brought leadership experience from Anglo-American School of Moscow, Frankfurt International School in Germany, and the Common School in Massachusetts.

Vistamar graduated its first senior class of 14 students in 2008.
