= Garden Street Academy =

Coordinates: 34°26′20.59″N 119°42′56.87″W

- San Roque High School
- 2300 Garden Street; Santa Barbara, California 93105; United States

Information
- Type: Private, Coeducational, Day school, Nonsectarian
- Established: 2002
- Closed: 2021
- Grades: K–12
- Colors: Purple and Gold
- Athletics: Private School Athletic League
- Mascot: Comets
- Website: www.gardenstreetacademy.org

Garden Street Academy was an independent co-educational school in Santa Barbara, California, United States. Founded in 2002, the school initially served elementary grades and expanded to include middle and high school grades by 2005.

Its campus was located on Garden Street near Mission Creek, adjacent to the Santa Barbara Mission area. The campus covered approximately 11 acres (4.5 hectares).

== History ==
Garden Street Academy originated in 2002 under the name San Roque School at 3214 Calle Cedro in the San Roque neighborhood of Santa Barbara. The site had previously housed a Catholic school of the same name, which operated from 1936. The new San Roque School was organized as an independent, non-denominational institution, serving local families following the closure of the Catholic school.

In 2011, the school relocated its full K–12 program to 2300 Garden Street, a site along Mission Creek near the Santa Barbara Mission and the Santa Barbara Museum of Natural History. Garden Street Academy operated at this location until 2021. In the late 2010s, annual tuition ranged from approximately $15,000 to $17,000, depending on grade level. Financial aid was available.

== Athletics ==
Garden Street Academy participated in the Private School Athletic League and maintained sports teams for both boys and girls. The upper school collaborated with other independent schools to compete in California Interscholastic Federation (CIF) events, including basketball, volleyball, and soccer.

The school suspended its programs during the 2020–2021 academic year due to the COVID-19 pandemic and subsequently ceased operations. In 2024, the property was sold at auction for $16.7 million.
