= Santa Cruz League =

High school athletic league

The Santa Cruz League is a high school athletic league that is part of the CIF Southern Section. Members are independent schools located around Los Angeles County.

== Members ==
- Saddleback Valley Christian Schools
- The Webb Schools
- Capistrano Valley Christian Schools
- Fairmont Preparatory Academy
- Santa Clarita Christian School
- Southlands Christian Schools
