= Valley Christian Academy (Osler, Saskatchewan) =

Private school in Saskatchewan, Canada

Coordinates: 52.361299°N 106.553854°W

Information
- Established: 1986; 40 years ago
- Grades: K-12
- Website: www.valleychristianacademy.ca

Valley Christian Academy (VCA) is a Christian school located near the town of Osler, Saskatchewan. It encompasses grades K–6 (elementary school), and 7–12 (high school). It is one of three Certified Independent Schools serving almost 200 families in the 'valley' area.

== History ==
VCA was founded in 1986, by the Bergthaler Mennonite Church in the nearby town of Warman, Saskatchewan.

== Curriculum ==
VCA complies with the provincial curriculum, with modifications made when necessary to maintain a Christian perspective. In addition to the provincial curriculum, VCA offers Christian Ethics as a mandatory class for all grade levels.

== Notable alumni ==
- Carissa Norsten - Olympic Silver Medalist (Rugby)
- Justin Laskowski - Canadian Men's Softball

== Funding ==
While the school is partially funded by the provincial government of Saskatchewan, students are also required to pay tuition fees according to how many siblings they have that attend the school:

Child	Members of Bergthaler Mennonite Church	Non-Members of Bergthaler Mennonite Church
1st Child	$105	$115
2nd Child	$75	$85
3rd Child	$65	$75
4th Child	$45	$55

- Students in Kindergarten pay half of whatever category they fall under.
