= Coastal Christian School (California) =

Private religious school in Pismo Beach, California, United States

Coordinates: 35.1373°N 120.6048°W

Location
- 1005 N. Oak Park Blvd. Pismo Beach, San Luis Obispo County, CA 93449; United States

Information
- School type: Private religious K-12
- Motto: "We are more than Conquerors…"
- Religious affiliation: Christian
- Denomination: Non-denominational Christianity
- Established: September 1971
- Status: Open
- Principal: Tom Olmstead, Head of School
  - Grade 12: 12 (2008)
- Student to teacher ratio: 17
- Hours in school day: 5.8 hours for secondary students (seven 50-minute class periods)
- Athletics: Basketball (boys and girls), Football (boys), Softball (girls), Baseball (boys), Beach Volleyball (girls), and Volleyball (boys and girls)
- Mascot: Conqueror
- Accreditation: Association of Christian Schools International
- Affiliation: Association of Christian Schools International
- Information: (805) 489-1213 Phone (805) 489-5394 Fax
- Website: Official Web Site

Coastal Christian School is a private, non-denominational Christian school from Kindergarten through 12th grade. The school's new permanent campus is in the Oak Park area of Pismo Beach, California.

== History ==
Coastal Christian School was originally incorporated in 1971 as Central Coast Christian Academy on the site of the First Presbyterian Church of Arroyo Grande. It was started by parents interested in providing Christian education and was established as a missionary outreach of the church. In September 1971, the school opened with four teachers and an enrollment of 39 students in grades K-6. In January of the same year, junior-high classes were added. In 1978, the academy added its high-school program and graduated its first four seniors in 1979.

In 1980, the church separated from the Presbyterian Church and changed its name to Grace Bible Church. The school continued, but with a multi-church sponsorship. In 1986, the school became the Coastal Christian School. The old site became the Lopez High School, and CCS moved temporarily to the Landmark Missionary Baptist Church. The school's new Oak Park Campus is off of Oak Park Boulevard in Pismo Beach. The campus is on a 28-acre (110,000 m^{2}) parcel overlooking the Arroyo Grande Valley, adjacent to the shared Pismo Beach and Arroyo Grande city limit line.

== Curriculum ==
Coastal Christian School teaches grades Kindergarten through twelfth grade. Grade levels 1-6 provide an elementary education, and 7-12 cover secondary education topics.

=== Kindergarten ===
Kindergarten is a full-day, fully integrated program. Phonics and sight sounds of letters are taught, as well as social skills in light of God's Word.

=== Elementary ===
First through sixth grades teach an academic program emphasizing the fundamentals of learning. Traditional methods such as phonics, memorization, penmanship, grammar, and mathematics are used to teach the courses. Music, weekly chapel, intramural sports, and field trips add variety and fun to the academic program. Students may also participate in ACSI-sponsored academic competitions.

=== Secondary ===
The secondary studies at CCS form a college preparatory program. Seven 50-minute classes are taught each day.

Students in seventh and eighth grade are required to take courses in the Bible, English, history, math, science, and physical education. Elective courses include the arts, computers, horticulture, music, Spanish, and speech.

During the ninth through twelfth grades, the focus on a college preparatory curriculum increases as students are prepared to meet the entrance requirements for the University of California system and other colleges and universities. The school provides career and college counseling and Biblical answers that students can use in their future endeavors.

High school course options include:

- Bible and religious studies
- Biological sciences: anatomy, biology, marine biology, and physiology
- Communications: English and foreign languages
- Mathematics: algebra through calculus
- Physical education: California Interscholastic Federation (CIF) sports
- Physical sciences: physics, chemistry, and geology
- Social sciences and humanities
- Special interests: choir, student government, and yearbook

In addition to college prep courses, secondary students participate in a variety of activities, including weekly chapel services, a luau, a winter formal, a spring banquet, an end-of-the-year BBQ, several day trips to beaches, hiking areas, and other outdoor learning areas.

Each fall, all of the secondary students travel to the nearby Lopez Canyon Conference Center for an annual Spiritual Emphasis Camp. On alternating years, the eighth and ninth grade students travel on an educational trip to Washington D.C., and the eleventh and twelfth grade students take an educational trip to Europe.

The twelve graduating seniors in 2008 had shared classes since elementary school.
