= Valley Christian Academy (Santa Maria, California) =

Location
- 2970 Santa Maria Way; Santa Maria, California; United States
- Coordinates: 34.9060467°N 120.4318842°W

Information
- Type: Private
- Religious affiliation: Baptist
- Established: 1967; 59 years ago
- Principal: Christopher Maples
- Website: vcalions.com/home.html

Valley Christian Academy (VCA) is a preK-12 private Christian school located in Santa Maria, California.

In September 2021, the school and its sponsoring congregation, First Baptist Church, were sued in federal court by the parent of a female football player at Cuyama Valley High School over allegations of sex discrimination. The plaintiff claimed that VCA's refusal to play CVHS because the latter had a female team member constituted a violation of Title IX as well as California Interscholastic Federation bylaws allowing female students to compete on teams with males.
