= Westmark School =

Private school in Encino, California, United States

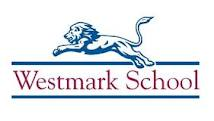

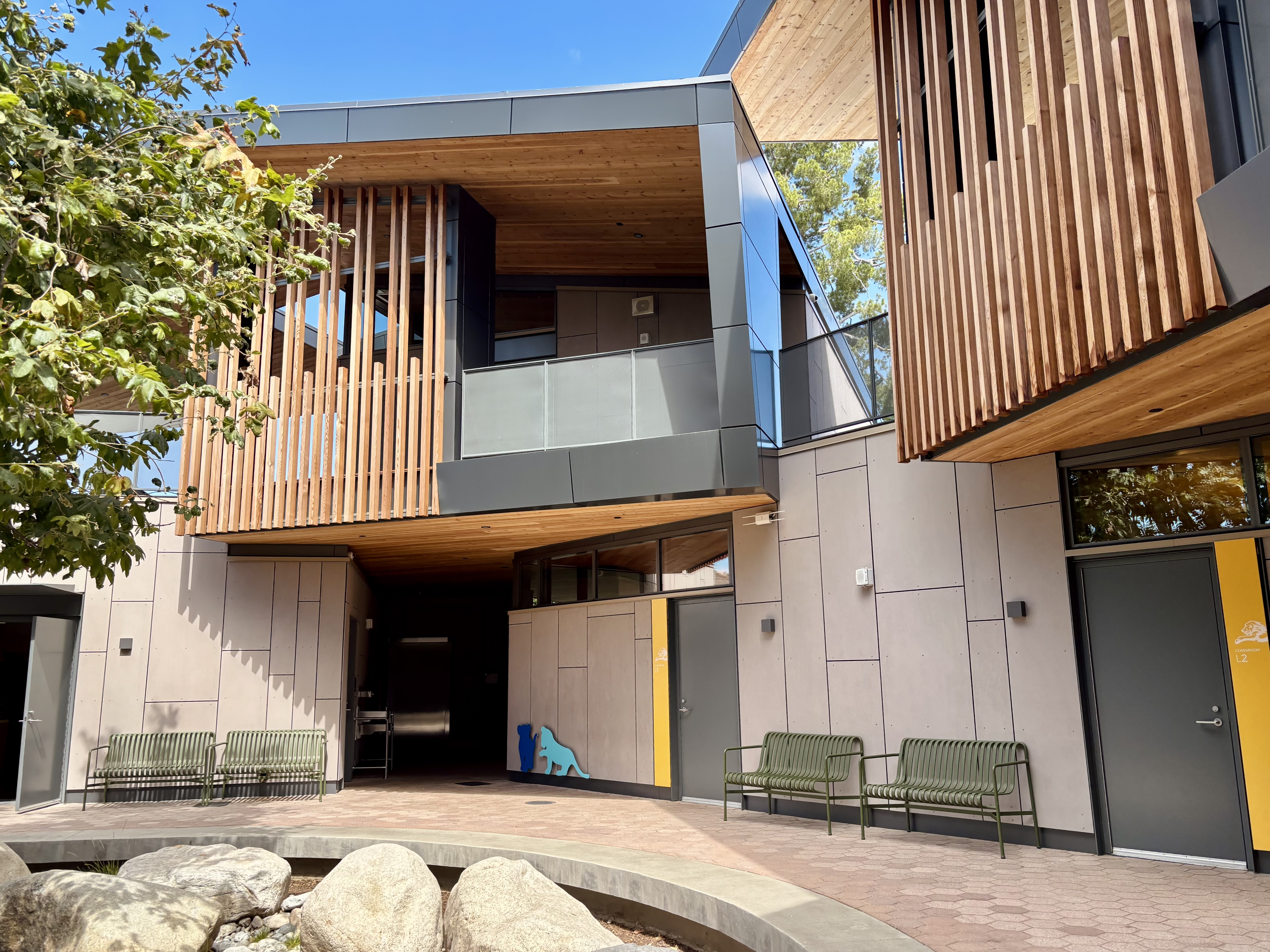
- Westmark School Lower School Building

Location
- 5461 Louise Avenue; Encino, California; United States; 34°10′13″N 118°30′40″W

Information
- Former name: Landmark West School
- Type: Private
- Established: 1983; 43 years ago
- NCES School ID: A9100989
- Head of school: Claudia Koochek
- Faculty: 70
- Grades: 2 to 12
- Enrollment: 220
- Student to teacher ratio: 5:1
- Campus size: 4.7 acres
- Colors: Navy, maroon, and white
- Mascot: African Lion
- Website: www.westmarkschool.org
- Last updated: Jan 23, 2026

Westmark School is a private school in Encino, California, teaching 2nd through 12th grade. The school serves children with language-based learning differences including attention-deficit disorder and dyslexia among other learning disorders.

== Description ==
Westmark serves children with language-based learning disabilitiys. The school built a new building for there lower school students.

== Lower School ==
The Westmark School Lower School building was designed with the goal to build a leaning environment for neurodiversity students and their needs.

Construction on the Lower School building started c. 2022 and opened 2 years later on December 13 2024.

The new building replaced the 1950s-era modular buildings that covered the lower school. Each classroom contains a tiny resource room. Classrooms also contain a bathroom for convenience. It is optional to use the bathroom located in the classroom.

== History ==
Westmark, originally Landmark West School was established in 1983. Landmark West School was located in the Greater Los Angeles area and later moved to Encino.

== Technology ==
The school was the first in the Los Angeles area to provide iPads to all students. School administrators and teachers consider the high costs worth it for what it adds to the education program. Westmark has a television station education program in which its 5th grade students write the material and produce the program. The school library has materials of various types to cater to the students with various learning needs.
