= CIF Southern Section =

Governing body for high school athletics

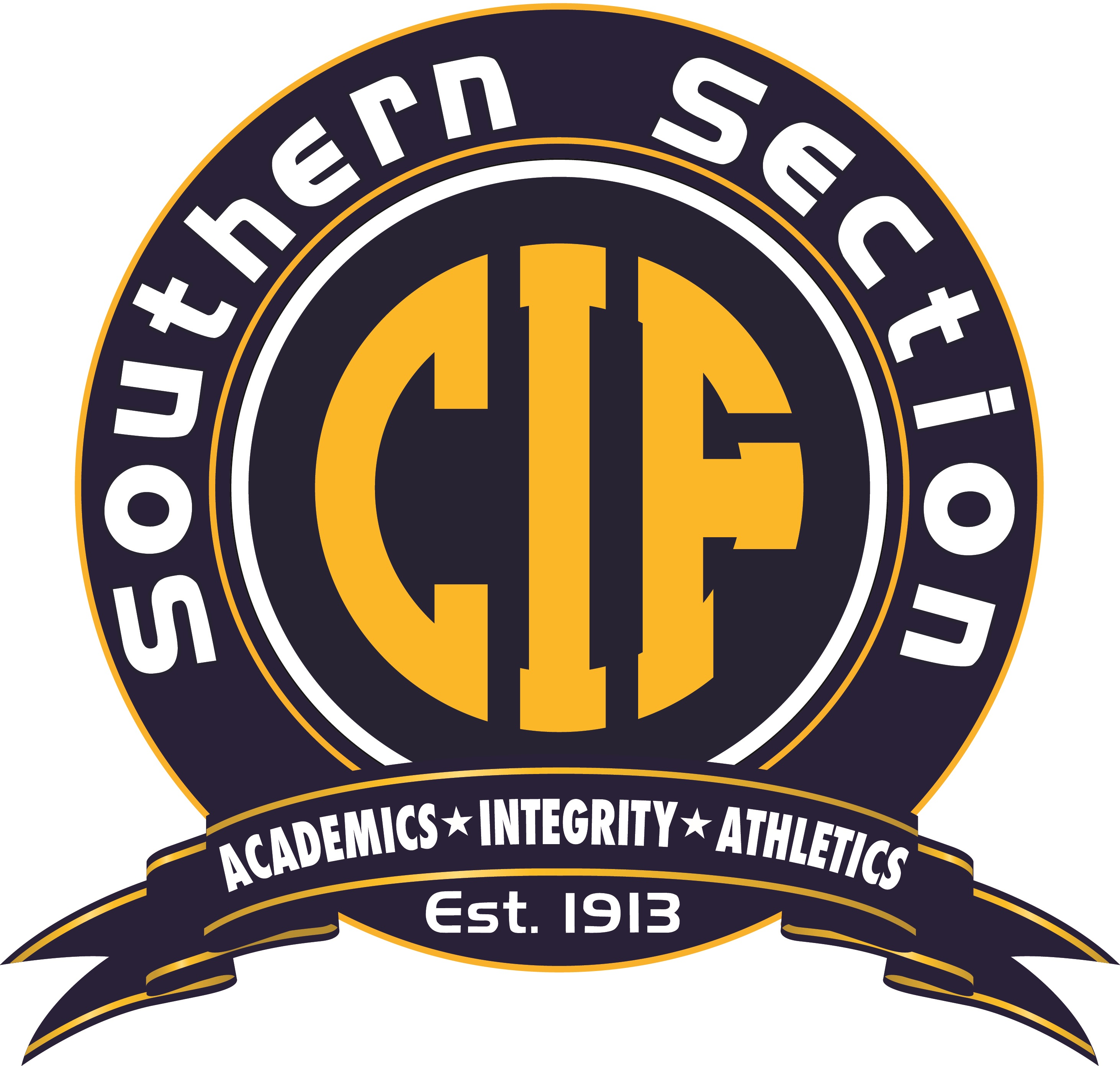
- Abbreviation: CIF-SS
- Formation: 1913
- Type: Non-profit organization
- Legal status: Association
- Purpose: Athletic/Educational
- Headquarters: 10932 Pine Street (Los Alamitos, California)
- Region served: Southern California
- Commissioner: Mike West
- Main organ: California Interscholastic Federation
- Website: www.cifss.org

The California Interscholastic Federation-Southern Section (CIF-SS) is the governing body for high school athletics in most of Southern California and is the largest of the ten sections that comprise the California Interscholastic Federation (CIF). Its membership includes most public and private high schools in Orange, Los Angeles, Riverside, San Bernardino, Ventura, and central and southern Santa Barbara counties. Teams from the Los Angeles Unified School District (LAUSD) and surrounding areas have competed in the CIF Los Angeles City Section since 1935. CIF-SS's offices are located in Los Alamitos.

Founded in 1913, the CIF Southern Section includes over 560 member public and private high schools and is by far the largest CIF section. Three of the ten CIF sections are individual current or former public school districts (Los Angeles, San Francisco and Oakland). The Southern Section's membership includes all private schools located within the service area of the LAUSD, which includes almost all of the city of Los Angeles plus some adjacent areas outside the city limits. If the CIF Southern Section were a state association, it would be the 10th largest in the United States.

For its first year of operation, the organization was called the Southern California Interscholastic Athletic Council (SCIAC). That acronym was taken over by the Southern California Intercollegiate Athletic Conference in 1915 after the Southern Section name was established. CIF was officially formed in 1914 and became statewide in 1917. The service area was larger, encompassing what is now the CIF Los Angeles City Section, which broke off in 1935, and the CIF San Diego Section which broke off in 1960. Imperial County was once part of the section as well, but broke off in 2000 to join the San Diego Section. At various points in time, schools in Arizona, Nevada, and Tijuana, Baja California, Mexico, were part of the section.

== Commissioners ==
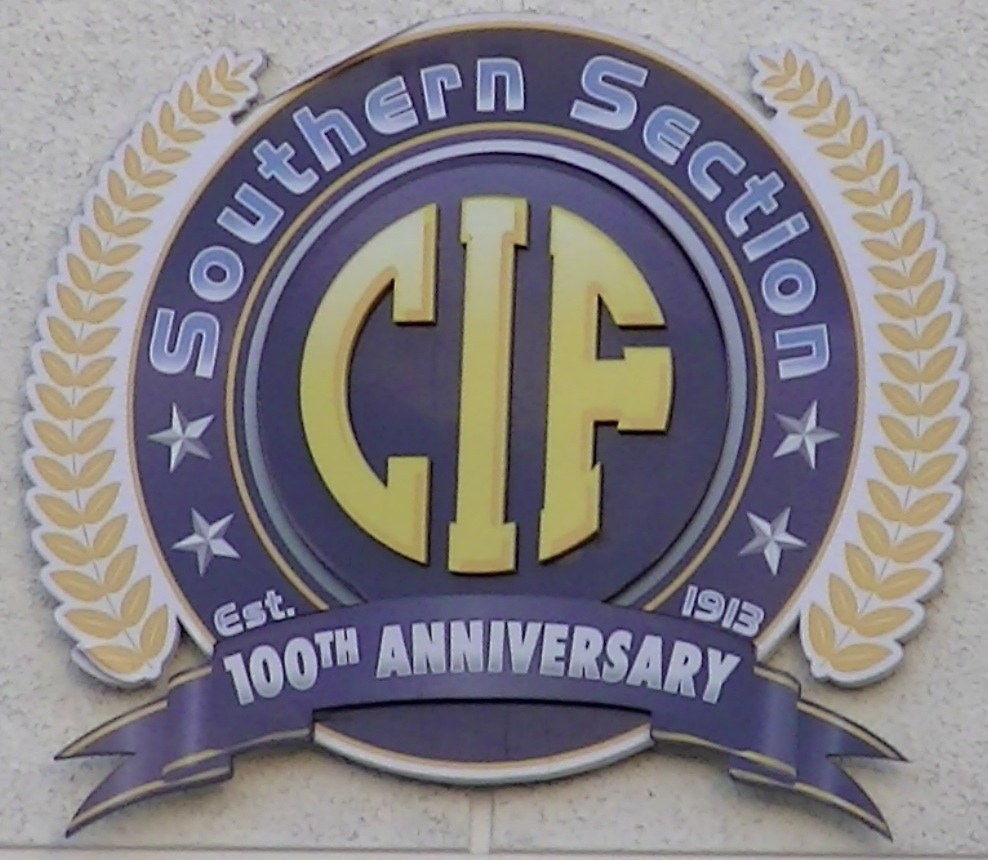
CIF-SS 100th Anniversary Logo

- Seth F. Van Patten (1913–1951)
- William W. Russell (1951–1954)
- J. Kenneth Fagans (1954–1975)
- Thomas E. Byrnes (1975–1980)
- Ray J. Plutko (1980–1986)
- Stan Thomas (1986–1993)
- Dean Crowley (1993–1999)
- James Staunton, Ed.D. (1999–2011)
- Rob Wigod (2011–2023)
- Mike West (2023–present)

== History ==
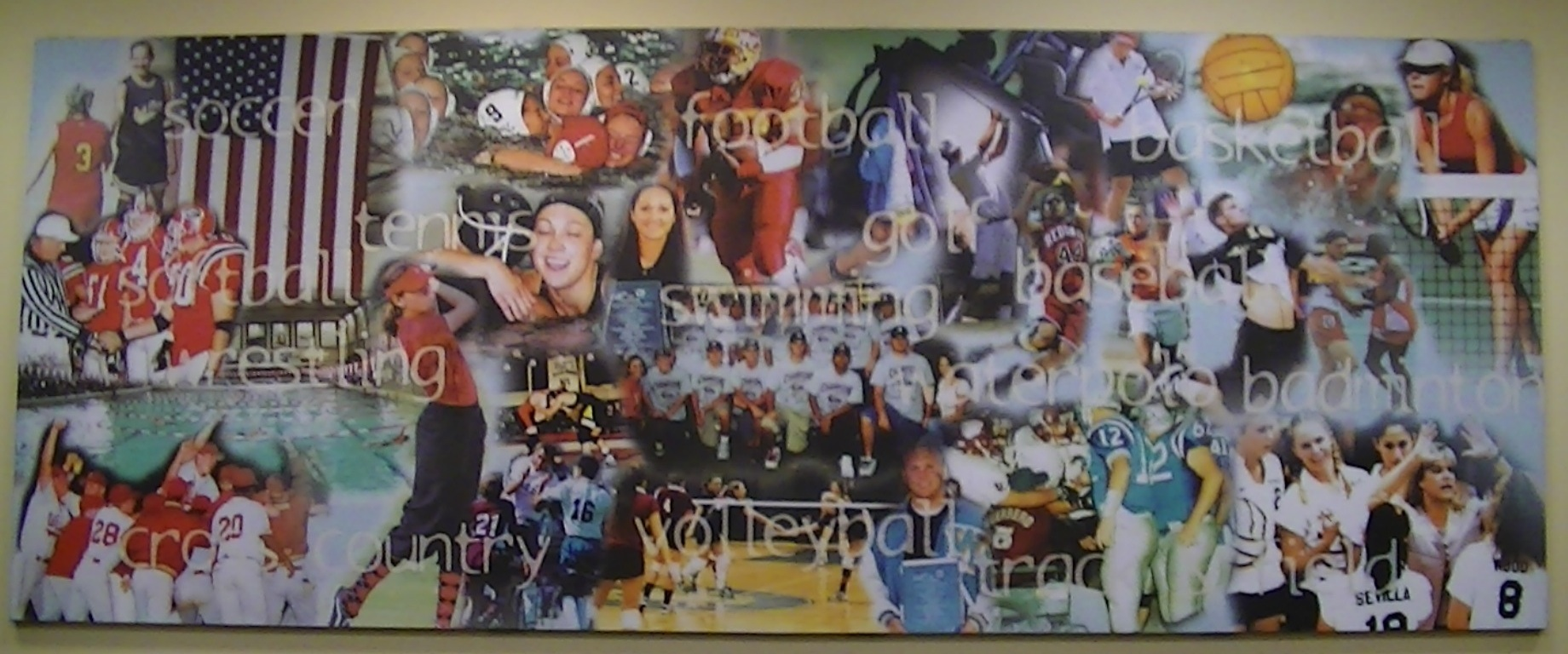
Collage of CIF-SS sports

The Southern Section was the outgrowth of a track and field meet. The Southern Section was founded on March 29, 1913, when a group of high school officials joined forces to conduct a track championship meet. Seth F. Van Patten, who served as Track Manager for the Southern Section in 1913 and is recognized as the founding father of the CIF-SS, served in that post until 1928 when he was officially named Secretary of the organization. He served as Commissioner until his retirement in 1951. On March 28, 1914, the Southern Section came under the administrative wing of the newly founded California Interscholastic Federation, and has since grown into one of the most progressive and respected organizations of its kind in the world. CIF-SS archives date back over 100 years. Despite its lengthy history, the Southern Section lists just 10 Commissioners (the term Secretary dropped) with William Russell holding the post from 1951 to 1954, J. Kenneth Fagans being the administrative head from 1954 until his retirement in early 1975, Thomas E. Byrnes accepting the Commissioner's post in 1975, while Ray Plutko served from 1980 to 1986. Stan Thomas served as Commissioner from July, 1986 to October, 1993 when Dean Crowley was appointed Acting Commissioner and was Commissioner of Athletics from July, 1994 until his retirement in September, 1999. James Staunton Ed.D., served as Commissioner from September 1, 1999, until his retirement on July 31, 2011. Rob Wigod began his service as Commissioner on August 1, 2011, after having served as Assistant Commissioner for 11 years, before retiring on August 1, 2023.

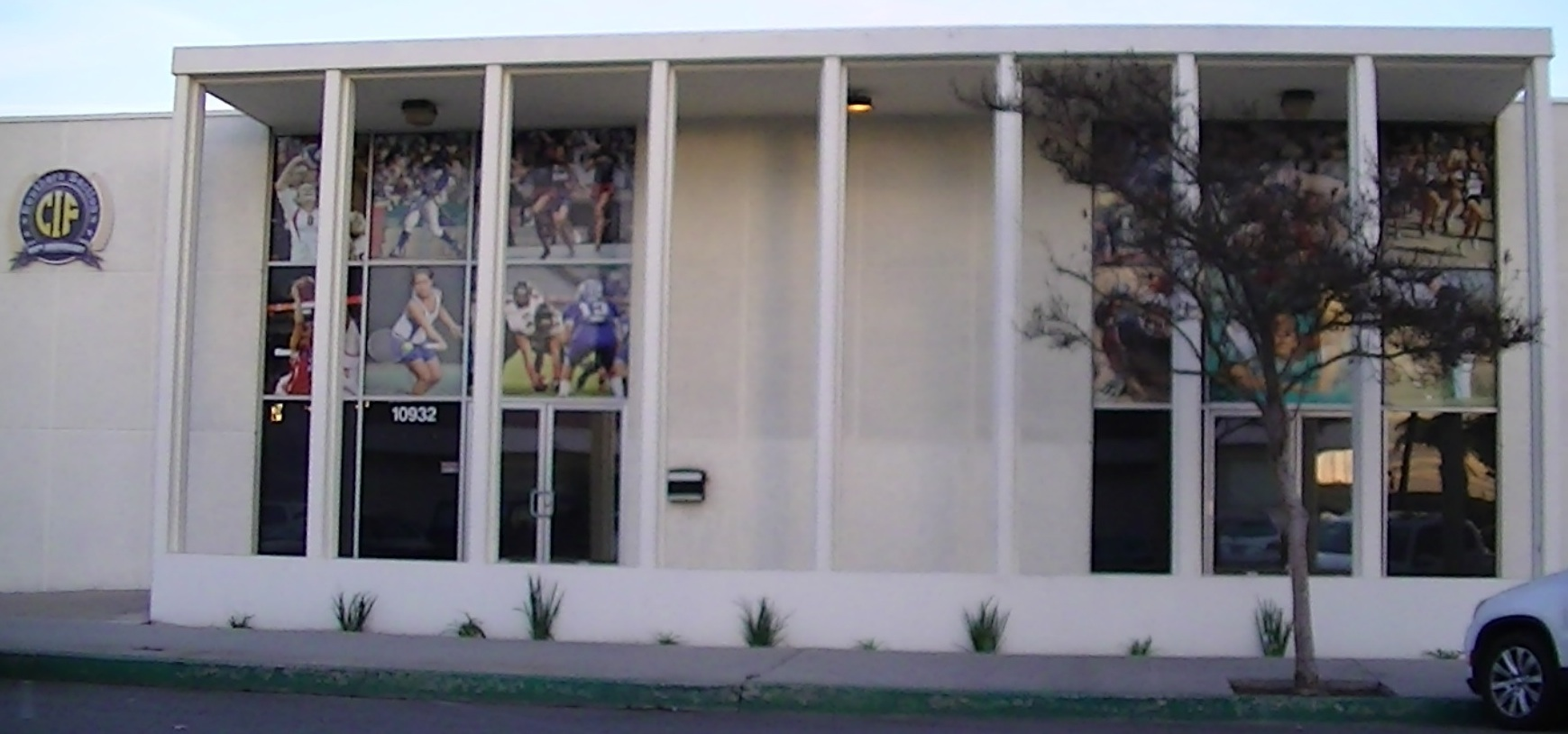
CIF SS Headquarters in Los Alamitos, California

The “home” of the Southern Section has a varied history. At the outset, basements, surplus school rooms and even the homes of secretaries served as the official office. South Pasadena High School graciously permitted the use of one of its rooms during the 1930s, with Oneonta School and South Pasadena High School serving as the home office from 1942 until 1949. There was a period of time the office was in the home of Commissioner Seth Van Patten. Still without an official office, the Southern Section moved its supplies to Helms Hall, a bakery in Culver City in 1949 and remained at the Venice Blvd. site until 1959. It was in February of that year that the Southern Section built its first ever administration office, located on the corners of Carmona and West Washington in Los Angeles. As membership grew and the Sections’ population center moved, so did the CIF-SS office. In 1965, the Section office built and moved into its third home and second devoted strictly to the CIF-SS day-to-day operations. That space was located next to Gahr High School on Artesia Blvd. in the city of Cerritos. That remained the home base of the section until October 2003 when the ever-expanding membership required a larger facility. Thus, the new and current administrative home became the Pine Street location in Los Alamitos.

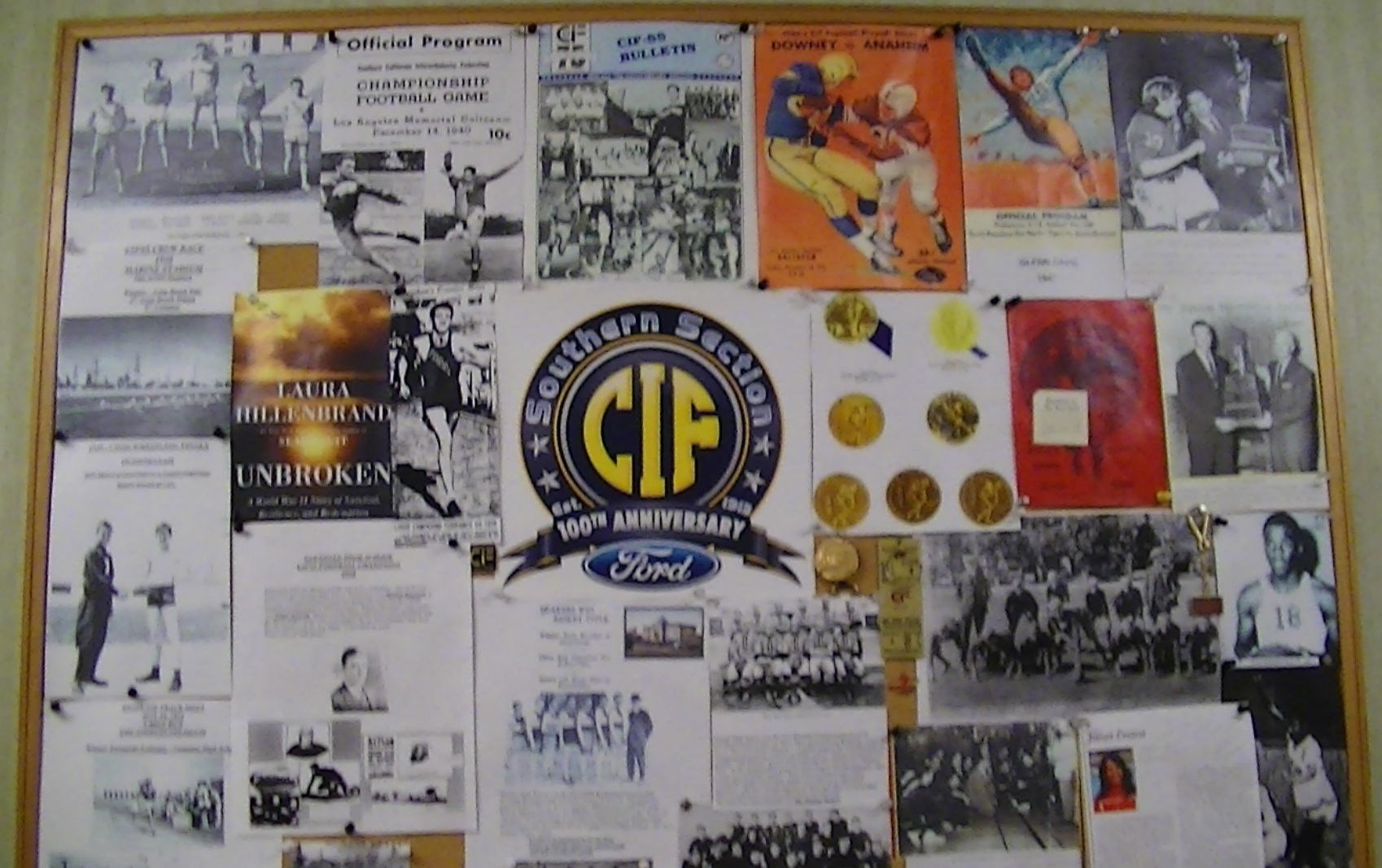
Historical news clippings of CIF-SS sports

The California Interscholastic Federation, Southern Section, is a non-profit corporation organized to direct and control both boys and girls athletics in the secondary schools within the Section. The Southern Section is administered on a day-to-day basis by the Commissioner, five Assistant Commissioners, a chief Financial Officer, a Marketing Manager and a staff of eight support personnel. The Southern Section is not only the oldest, but the largest of 10 such sections in the state—its membership has grown from an original 30 schools to over 560+ schools and from 5 leagues to almost 90 leagues.

== Sports ==
CIF-SS sponsors the following sports:

=== Fall season ===
- American Football (11-person) (divided into 14 divisions)
- 8-person football (2 divisions)
- Competitive Traditional Cheer
- Cross country (5 divisions)
- Field Hockey
- Girls Flag Football
- Girls Volleyball (9 divisions)
- Girls Tennis (6 divisions)
- Boys Water Polo (7 divisions)
- Girls Golf (4 divisions)

=== Winter season ===
- Boys Basketball (10 divisions)
- Girls Basketball (10 Divisions)
- Soccer (Boys and Girls) (7 divisions)
- Girls Water Polo (7 divisions)
- Boys Wrestling (7 Divisions)
- Girls Wrestling (7 divisions)

=== Spring season ===
- Baseball (9 Divisions)
- Badminton
- Boys Golf (7 Divisions)
- Gymnastics
- Lacrosse (Boys and Girls) (3 Divisions)
- Softball (7 Divisions)
- Swimming (Boys and Girls - 4 Divisions)
- Boys Tennis (6 Divisions)
- Track and Field (Boys and Girls - 4 Divisions)
- Boys Volleyball (6 Divisions)
- Girls Beach Volleyball (2 Divisions)
- Girls Stunt Cheer (1 Divisions)

== Leagues ==
- 605 League
- Academy League
- Agape/Cross Valley Conference
- Agape League
- Almont League
- Ambassador League
- Angelus League (football only)
- Arrowhead League
- Arrowhead Athletic Conference
- Baseline League
- Bay League
- Big VIII League
- Camino Del Rey Association
- Camino Real League
- Century Conference
- Channel League
- Citrus Belt League
- Citrus Coast League
- Coast Valley League
- Coast View Conference
- Coastal League
- Coastal Canyon League
- Condor League
- Crestview League
- Cross Valley League
- Del Rey League
- Del Rio League
- Desert Empire League
- Desert Sky League
- Desert Valley League
- Empire League
- Express League
- Foothill League
- Freeway League
- Frontier League
- Gateway League
- Garden Grove League
- Gold Coast League
- Golden League
- Golden West League
- Hacienda League
- Heritage League
- Independence League
- Inland Valley League
- International Conference
- International League
- Ivy League
- Liberty League
- Liberty Conference
- Los Angeles Athletic Association
- Majestic League
- Marmonte League
- Mid-Cities League
- Miramonte League
- Mission League
- Mission Valley League
- Mojave River League
- Montview League
- Moore League
- Mountain Pass League
- Mountain Valley League
- Mt. Baldy League
- Mulholland League
- National League
- North Hills League
- Ocean League
- Olympic League
- Omega League
- Orange League
- Orange Coast League
- Pacific League
- Pacific Coast Conference
- Pacific Hills League
- Pacific Valley League
- Pacific View League
- Pioneer League
- Palomares League
- Prep League
- Raincross Conference
- Rio Hondo League
- River Valley League
- San Andreas League
- San Joaquin League
- Santa Fe League
- Sea View League
- Serra League
- Skyline League
- Soledad League
- South Coast League
- South Valley League
- Southwestern League
- Sunbelt League
- Suburban Valley Conference
- Sunkist League
- Sunset Conference
- Sunset League
- Sunshine League
- Surf League
- Trinity League
- Tri-County Athletic Association
- Tri-County Premier
- Tri-Valley League
- Valle Vista League
- Victory League
- Wave League
- Western Athletic Conference
- Western League
