= El Modena High School =

Coordinates: 33.789634°N 117.812115°W

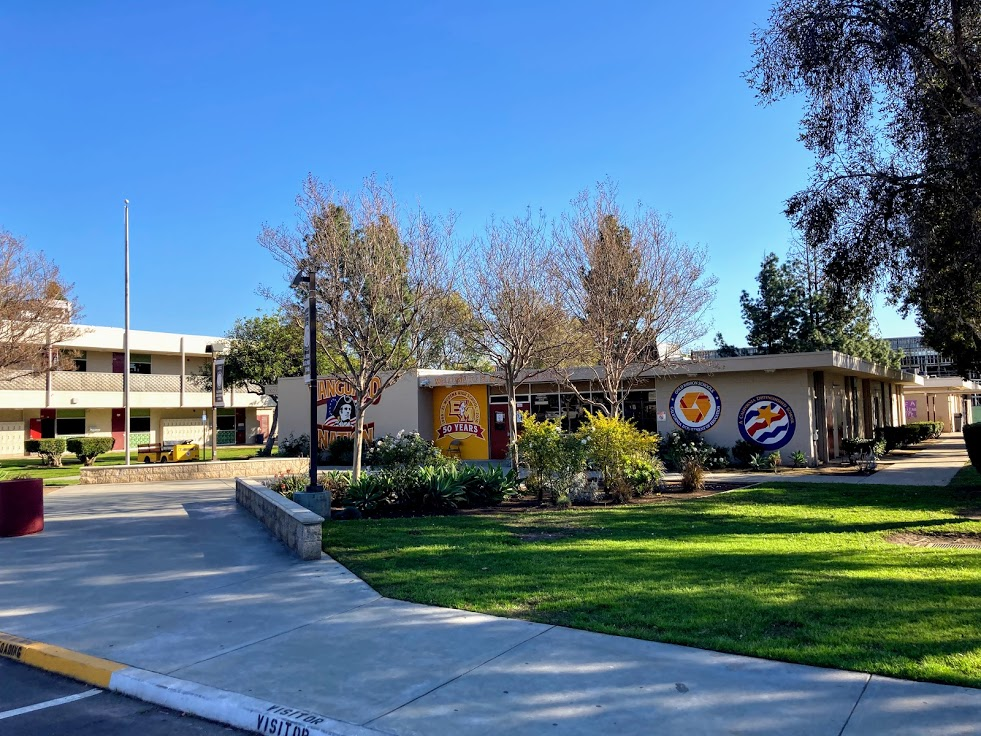

Location
- 3920 Spring St; Orange, California 92869

Information
- Type: Public
- Established: Opened September 1966, Graduated first class June 1968
- Founder: 1966 60 years ago
- School district: Orange Unified School District
- Principal: Robert King
- Teaching staff: 83.69 (FTE)
- Grades: 9-12
- Enrollment: 1,795 (2024-2025)
- Student to teacher ratio: 21.45
- Colors: Cardinal, gold, and white
- Mascot: The Vanguard
- Newspaper: Frontline
- Yearbook: Escena
- Feeder schools: Santiago Charter Middle School; McPherson Magnet Middle School
- Website: elmodenahs.org

El Modena High School, colloquially called El Mo or ElMo, is a traditional four-year public high school located in the El Modena neighborhood of the City of Orange in Orange County, California. It is one of four high schools in the Orange Unified School District, along with Villa Park High School, Orange High School, and Canyon High School.

Founded in 1966, its first class graduated in June 1968, the school celebrated its 50th anniversary during the 2016–17 school year. In 2019 construction began after district voters approved Measure S in November 2016.

== History ==
=== Nature Center ===
In 1972 El Modena chemistry teacher Jeanne Carter established the school's Nature Center. It is dedicated to teaching water conservation, ecological principles and research techniques to students and community members. On February 2, 2023, the Orange Unified School District Board of Trustees voted unanimously to rename the center the "Jeanne Carter Nature Center" in honor of its founder.

=== Gender-Sexuality Alliance ===
In August 1999, Anthony Colin ("Colin") decided to form a "Gay-Straight Alliance" (now Gay–straight alliance) after Matthew Shepard, a young man from Wyoming, died after being brutally assaulted due to his homosexuality. Colin wanted to form the club to promote acceptance among and for gay and straight students at the school. Colin asked Mrs. Maryina Herde, a drama and English teacher at the school, to serve as the faculty advisor and she accepted.

Public schools have an obligation to provide an equal opportunity for all students to receive an education in a safe, nonhostile, nondiscriminatory environment. Our goal in this organization is to raise public awareness and promote tolerance by providing a safe forum for discussion of issues related to sexual orientation and homophobia. We wish to stress the need for people to put aside their personal prejudice and agree to treat everyone with respect when the situation calls for it. We invite ALL students, gay or straight, to join us in discussions, field trips, lectures, and social activities that will counterattack unfair treatment and prejudice. We respect privacy and require NO one to make disclosures regarding his or her own sexual orientation. This is not a sexual issue, it is about gaining support and promoting tolerance and respect for all students.

— Shannon MacMillan, Colin's friend, The club's submitted mission statement

The Orange Unified School District board refused permission for students to form the club. Students in the club sued the school board, claiming that their rights under the First Amendment and the 1984 Equal Access Act had been violated.

In the first ruling of its kind, Judge David O. Carter of the United States District Court for the Central District of California issued a preliminary injunction ordering the school to allow the GSA to meet.

== Extracurricular activities ==
=== Athletics ===
A vanguard, used as the school's mascot, is a soldier in the foremost division or the front part of an army. Vanguards are the troops assembled in the front line when going into battle, which is why the school newspaper is titled The Frontline. The school contains a variety of sports, including but not limited to : Tennis, Basketball, Football, Volleyball, Sprints, Hurdles, Distance Running, Cross Country, Pole Vault, High Jump, Long Jump, Shot Put, Discus, Water Polo, Swim, Soccer, Lacrosse, Baseball, Wrestling, Dance, Cheer, Pom, and Softball.

- Volleyball: State champions in 2019

== Notable alumni ==
- Ronnie Creager, skateboarder, businessperson
- Mikey Day (class of 1998), actor, comedian, Saturday Night Live
- Freddie Freeman (class of 2007), MLB first baseman for Los Angeles Dodgers 2022-present and Atlanta Braves 2010-2021
- Robby Gordon, race car driver
- Michael Hartl, physicist, author, and entrepreneur
- Brittany Ishibashi (class of 1998), actress
- Michael Pitre, American football coach for the NFL's Atlanta Falcons
- Jeff Spek, NFL and USFL tight end
- Michael Terry (athlete) (class of 1991), Olympic and NCAA athlete, track and field
- Milo Ventimiglia (class of 1995), film and television actor, Gilmore Girls and This Is Us
- Haylie Wagner (class of 2011), softball player
