= Bill Vinovich =

American football official (born 1960)

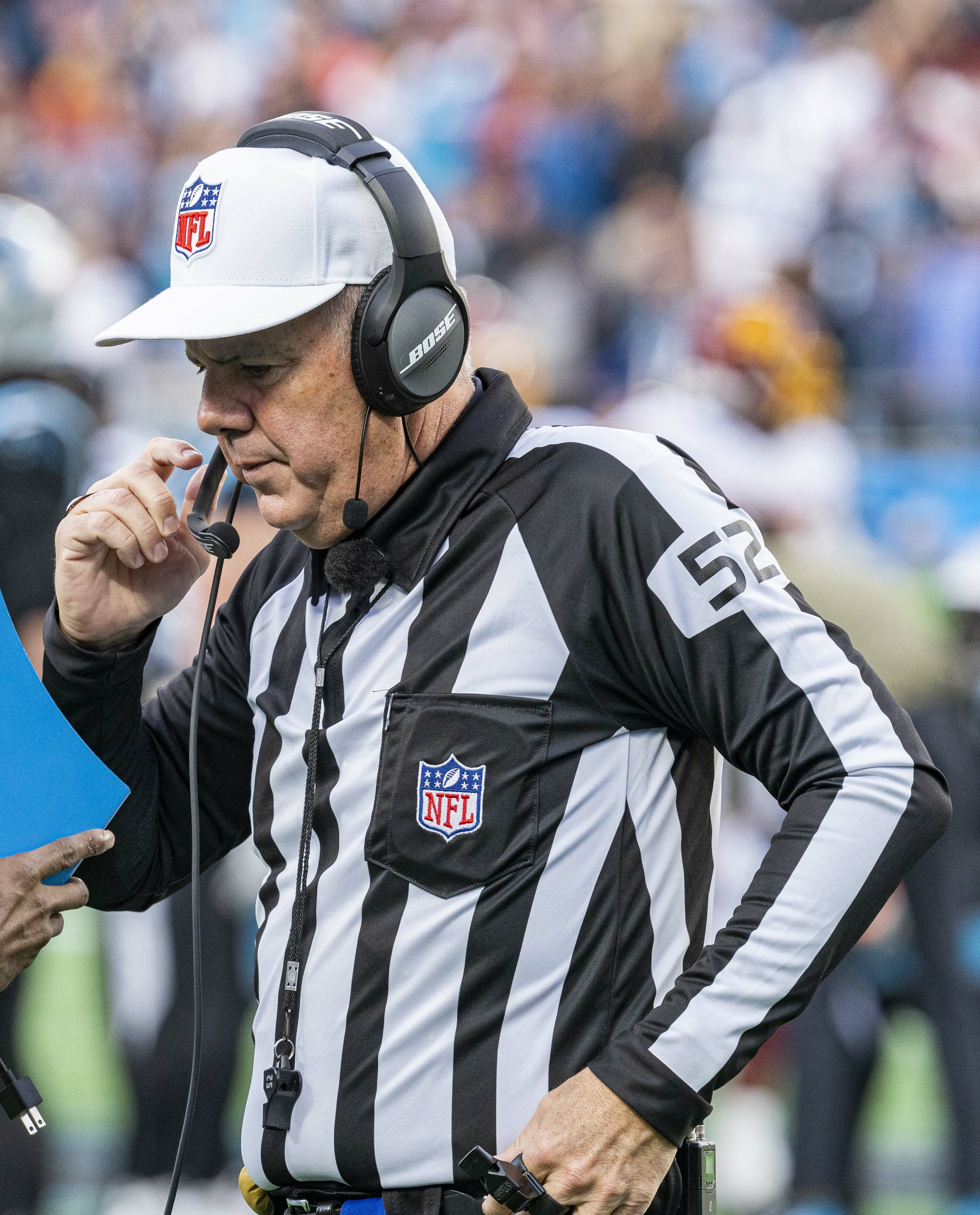
- Vinovich in 2021
- Born: Bill Vinovich III; December 1, 1960 (age 65); Beaver County, Pennsylvania, U.S.
- Education: Canyon High School University of San Diego
- Occupations: NFL official (2001–2006, 2012–present), college basketball official
- Children: 2

Bill Vinovich III (born December 1, 1960) is an American professional football official in the National Football League (NFL) who has worked as an NFL referee from 2001 to 2006 and since 2012; he is also a college basketball official.

== Early life ==
Vinovich was born in Beaver County, Pennsylvania. His family moved to California, where he played football for Canyon High School in Anaheim and through his four years of college, transitioning to officiating upon his magna cum laude graduation in 1983 from the University of San Diego with a bachelor's degree in business administration with an emphasis in accounting. His paternal grandfather and father were also sports officials.

== Officiating career ==
Vinovich began officiating football at the high school and small-college level; he then officiated in the Canadian Football League and Arena Football League, followed by the Mountain West Conference of NCAA Division I.

Vinovich began his career in the NFL as a side judge on the officiating crew headed by referees Dick Hantak (2001) and Ed Hochuli (2002–2003) before being promoted to referee for the start of the 2004 NFL season after former referee Ron Blum returned to his original position of line judge. In the NFL, he wears uniform number 52, previously worn by George Rennix, Ben Tompkins and Tony Veteri Jr.

As a college basketball official, Vinovich officiated a first round contest between Virginia Tech and Illinois in the 2007 NCAA Division I men's basketball tournament on March 16, 2007.

Due to a heart condition, Bill Vinovich retired from field duty as an NFL official prior to the 2007 season, to serve as the replay official for Ed Hochuli. He was replaced as a referee by former side judge John Parry.

In 2012, doctors gave Vinovich a clean bill of health, and he returned for the 2012 NFL season as a substitute official, working several games during the season. His first game back since 2006 was on October 14, 2012, heading Scott Green's crew in Philadelphia.

Vinovich was the referee of Super Bowl XLIX, played on February 1, 2015, at the University of Phoenix Stadium in Glendale, Arizona. Before that, he was the alternate referee of Super Bowl XLVII, which was played in New Orleans on February 3, 2013. In addition, Vinovich has officiated nine other post-season games (listed here by NFL season): three conference championship games (2002 AFC, 2015 NFC, and 2018 NFC), four divisional playoff games (2003 NFC, 2012 AFC, 2014 AFC, and 2017 NFC), and two wild card playoff games (2006 AFC and 2013 NFC).

Vinovich was the referee for the 2018 NFC Championship Game, in which the lack of a penalty called on a controversial play late in the fourth quarter became the most discussed part of the game. Because of the alleged no-call, which may have denied the New Orleans Saints a trip to the Super Bowl, a petition was filed to fire Vinovich and his officiating crew. The petition collected nearly 150,000 signatures, but no action was taken by the NFL.

On January 15, 2020, Vinovich was announced as the referee for Super Bowl LIV, which took place on February 2, 2020.

In a 2022 Week 15 game between the Miami Dolphins and Buffalo Bills, in Buffalo, the Bills fans in attendance threw snowballs onto the field, aiming for Dolphins players and staff. Vinovich stopped play and announced that "We've just been informed that if a snowball hits someone, it'll be a 15-yard penalty against Buffalo." However, no such penalty or rule exists, and Vinovich had simply made it up on the spot.

On January 25, 2022, the NFL named him as the alternate referee for Super Bowl LVI. He and his officiating crew joined the main officiating crew headed by main referee Ronald Torbert.

In January 2024, Vinovich was named as the referee for Super Bowl LVIII in Las Vegas, which took place between the Kansas City Chiefs and the San Francisco 49ers on February 11, 2024. The game was a rematch of Super Bowl LIV, making Vinovich the first referee to preside over two Super Bowl meetings between the same teams.

=== 2024 crew ===
- R: Bill Vinovich
- U: Scott Walker
- DJ: Dale Keller
- LJ: Tripp Sutter
- FJ: Aaron Santi
- SJ: Jimmy Buchanan
- BJ: Todd Prukop
- RO: Denise Crudup
- RA: Chad Wakefield

== Personal life ==
Outside of his officiating career, Vinovich works as a certified public accountant.
