= Circle constant =

Circle constant may refer to:

- Pi, π, ≈ 3.14, the constant of proportionality between the circumference of a circle and its diameter
- Tau (mathematics), τ, proposed notation for 2π ≈ 6.28, the constant of proportionality between the circumference of a circle and its radius
