= East Anaheim =

East Anaheim may refer to:

- An unofficial area of Anaheim, California, east of Downtown Anaheim, south of the Riverside Freeway (SR 91), west of the Santa Ana River and north of Ball Road
- names of various facilities in or around Anaheim Hills, the far eastern part of Anaheim today
