= Villa Park High School =

Location
- 18042 Taft Avenue; Villa Park, California 92861; United States; 33°49′01″N 117°49′03″W

Information
- Type: Public high school
- Established: 1964; 62 years ago
- School district: Orange Unified School District
- CEEB code: 052279
- NCES School ID: 062865004456
- Principal: Dennis McCuistion
- Teaching staff: 82.35 (FTE)
- Grades: 9–12
- Gender: Coeducational
- Enrollment: 2,023 (2024–2025)
- Student to teacher ratio: 24.57
- Campus: Large suburban
- Colors: Black; Silver; Columbia Blue
- Mascot: The Spartan
- Rival: Canyon High School (Anaheim, California)
- Feeder schools: Cerro Villa Middle School
- Website: www.villaparkhigh.org

Villa Park High School (VPHS) is a four-year suburban public high school located in Villa Park, California, United States. It was built in 1964 and is one of four comprehensive high schools in the Orange Unified School District. The campus serves students residing in Villa Park and portions of the cities of Orange and Anaheim.

Enrollment at VPHS (for the 2020–2021 school year) was 2,185 students. The ethnic breakdown of the student population was 10.4% Asian, 51.5% Hispanic, 0.8% African American and 32.1% white (non-Hispanic). The professional staff includes 88 teachers, six counselors, a library media specialist, a career adviser, an activities director, and three administrators. A dedicated classified staff also supports the school program.

The school Academic Performance Index (API) for the 2011–2012 school year was 815, a six-point increase over the previous year.

== Notable alumni ==
- Evan Battey — former professional basketball player and current assistant basketball coach at the University of Colorado
- Aaron Boone – former MLB infielder; ESPN Baseball Tonight analyst; manager of the New York Yankees 2017–present
- Kevin Costner – actor
- Dianna Gwilliams – Church of England dean
- Dave Leeper – former MLB outfielder, Kansas City Royals (1985 World Series Champions)
- Robbie Martin — former NFL Football Player Detroit Lions and Indianapolis Colts.
- Pat McInally – All-Pro NFL punter, Cincinnati Bengals
- Paul Moyer – NFL football player, Seattle Seahawks
- Jason Sanders – NFL kicker, Miami Dolphins
- Monte Scheinblum – 1992 US National and World Long Driving Champion
- L. J. Smith – author of The Vampire Diaries
- Jim Sorensen – world and American Masters record holder in the 800 metres and 1500 metres
- Mark Trumbo – MLB baseball player, Baltimore Orioles
