= OUSD =

OUSD is an acronym used to refer to the following school districts:

- Oakland Unified School District
- Ontario Unified School District
- Ojai Unified School District
- Orange Unified School District
