= Whitey Harrison =

American surfer (1913–1993)

Lorrin Carrell "Whitey" Harrison (24 April 1913 – 8 September 1993) was an American surfer, lifeguard, surf equipment innovator, and commercial diver. Harrison championed outrigger canoeing in Southern California following his numerous trips to Waikiki, Hawaii.

== Early life ==
Harrison was born to Frederick Earl Harrison and Lillie Cornelia (Sanford) Harrison from Garden Cove, California. His sister, Ethel (Harrison) Kukea, was also a pioneer surfer in Southern California. Harrison's family often traveled by horse and wagon from their home in Santa Ana Canyon through Aliso Canyon to reach the ocean at Laguna Beach, some thirty miles away. He credited his interest in surfing to a trip to Redondo Beach in 1920 where he saw surfers standing up on boards for the first time. Harrison attended Orange High School in Orange, CA.

Harrison later went to work for a manufacturer of prefabricated homes in Los Angeles. As a side business, the company, Pacific System Homes, made surfboards because they had the equipment to laminate wooden planks together. Harrison would complete four boards daily for a monthly salary of $100. These surfboards were first called "Swastika Boards," the first commercial surfboards.

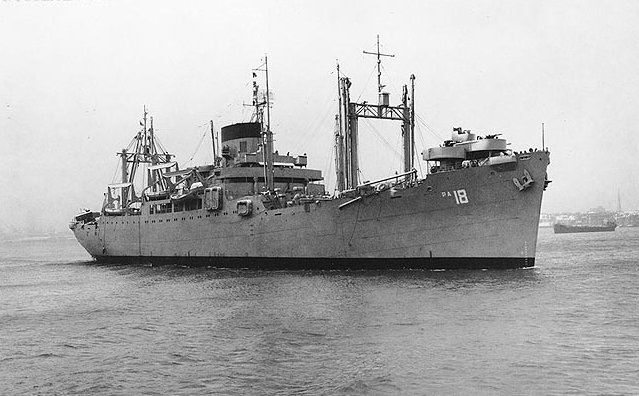
President Jackson in the Pacific Ocean

After graduating from high school in 1932, Harrison attempted to study at Fullerton Junior College. He did not find college interesting but found a passion at the beach. He later attempted to stow away to Hawaii in September 1934. Harrison first boarded the Monterey, hiding away in a deck chair before being caught minutes away from Waikiki Beach and sent to the freighter Manukai that would take him back to San Francisco. Harrison tried again aboard President Jackson and succeeded in arriving in Honolulu, HI. While in Waikiki, Harrison worked as a beach boy and was in the company of other surfers, including native Hawaiian Duke Kahanamoku.

== Contributions to surfing ==
Harrison built his first wave-riding board in fifth grade, a 5-foot, 18-inch-wide plank covered with canvas. At the age of 12, Harrison began his stand-up surfing experience in 1925 in the waters of Corona del Mar.

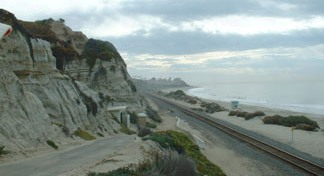
San Onofre State Beach, CA

Harrison would make journeys from California to Waikiki and bring his love of Hawaiian surfing and culture back to the mainland. He built surf racks on the beach at Dana Point, for example, after returning from Waikiki in 1936 where he had seen them at the Outrigger Canoe Club.

On the last weekend of May in 1937, local southern Californians went down to San Onofre for the christening of Harrison's outrigger canoe. The canoe was made of wooden planks inspired by Native Hawaiian traditions. Harrison also built a dugout canoe from a single tree, following Hawaiian traditions.

On July 9, 1939, San Onofre held the seventh annual Pacific Coast Surf Riding Championships (PCSRC). Harrison won the contest, making him the top surfer in California.

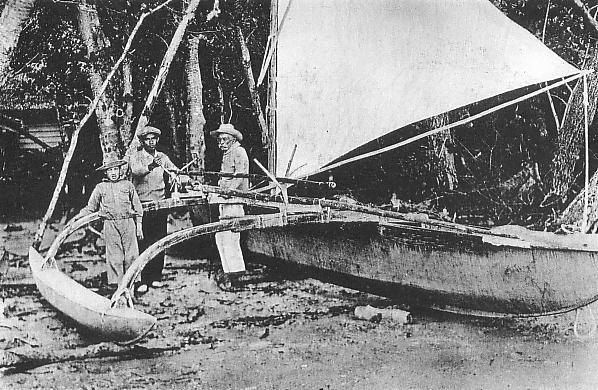
Obeikei (foreign decent) Islanders in the Ogasawara Islands with outrigger canoe, circa 1930, similar to those built by Harrison.

During his free time, Harrison built and renovated surfboards and outrigger canoes in his barn building. He experimented with fins and later with polyurethane foam to reduce the weight of wooden boards.

The Dana Outrigger Canoe Club, created by Harrison, held its first competition in 1959. The competition consisted of outrigger canoe racing between various teams, and the first club competition featured a team from Oahu racing Harrison’s team from Avalon to Newport Dunes, just south of Los Angeles.

== Relationships ==
On 25 December 1935, Harrison married Muriel Lambert (1915-1945).

On August 3, 1946, Harrison married his second wife, Cecilia Yorba, from one of California's pioneering Spanish families. He moved into her family's historic late 18th century cattle ranch in San Juan Capistrano. The family barn, built around 1890, grew into a sort of laboratory for surfboard and canoe design as well as museum of the development and evolution of surfing equipment throughout the mid-20th century.

== Death ==
In 1984, Harrison suffered a heart attack and underwent quadruple bypass surgery. Within months, he was back in the water. Known to local younger surfers as the old guy in the straw hat—another Hawaiian symbol with which Harrison is affiliated—he appeared in the early '90s in a national Armor All commercial, a Life magazine profile and as a guest on the "Late Night with David Letterman" television show.

On September 8, 1993 Harrison experienced a second heart attack. He was at his second home on the island of Hawaii. His wife of 46 years, Cecelia, and a daughter, Marian, were with him at the time. The family had made the drive home from a morning swim when the incident occurred. Funeral services had not been announced but it was reported that his ashes were spread in the Pacific Ocean in Hawaii.

Various obituaries had been published on behalf of Harrison in the New York Times, Los Angeles Times, and the Orange County Register. Steve Pezman, longtime editor and publisher of surf magazines, wrote for the Los Angeles Times that Harrison "was part of the lore and legend of surfing. And Lorrin was a major player in the culture in those naïve days when California wasn’t carpeted with subdivisions."

== Legacy and Honors ==
On April 24, 1993, Harrison held an 80th birthday celebration at San Onofre State Beach. He donned his signature palm-frond hat and surfed for more than an hour before beaching his board among a crowd of well-wishers. "Harrison has epitomized what is authentic and true to the sport of surfing. Often outfitted with a brightly-colored aloha shirt, a palm-frond hat, and a ukulele."

The Dana Outrigger Canoe Club holds an annual competition in honor of Harrison. The Whitey Harrison Classic is an outrigger race of 20 miles with competitors of ages 12 to 70. It attracts over 900 competitors who are divided into 19 divisions.
