= Jimmy Endersby =

American baseball player (born 1998)

Kansas City Monarchs – No. 31
- Pitcher
- Born: January 16, 1998 (age 28); Anaheim, California, U.S.
- Bats: Right Throws: Right

James Robery Endersby (born January 16, 1998) is an American professional baseball pitcher for the Kansas City Monarchs of the American Association of Professional Baseball.

== Career ==
=== Amateur ===
Endersby attended Orange High School in Orange, California, where he played four years on the baseball team. As a senior in 2017, he was named the Most Valuable Player (MVP) of the Golden West League. After graduating, he enrolled at Cal State Fullerton where he started his collegiate career as an infielder before transitioning to a pitcher as a sophomore. He pitched only 16 2/3 innings combined in 2018 and 2019, and transferred to Concordia University Irvine following the end of the 2019 season. With Concordia in 2020, he started five games and went 5–0 with a 1.88 ERA and 37 strikeouts before the season was cancelled due to the COVID-19 pandemic.

=== Houston Astros ===
Endersby went unselected in the 2020 Major League Baseball draft, and signed with the Houston Astros as an undrafted free agent. He made his professional debut in 2021 with the Asheville Tourists and was promoted to the Corpus Christi Hooks in mid-June. Over 24 games (17 starts) between the two teams, he went 7–7 with a 3.90 ERA and 110 strikeouts over 97 innings.

Endersby returned to Corpus Christi to open the 2022 season. In mid-July, after appearing in 16 games (with 12 starts) and compiling a 2–5 record with a 3.88 ERA and 66 strikeouts over 72 innings, he was promoted to the Sugar Land Space Cowboys. Over 12 games (eight starts) with Sugar Land, he went 2–3 with a 7.66 ERA over 44 2/3 innings. Endersby returned to Sugar Land for the 2023 season. He appeared in a total of 37 games and went 4-6 with a 5.61 ERA and 61 strikeouts over 67 1/3 innings. Endersby was released by the Astros organization on March 17, 2024.

=== Chicago Cubs ===
On July 12, 2024, Endersby signed a minor league contract with the Chicago Cubs. In 12 games (8 starts) for the Double-A Tennessee Smokies, he compiled a 1-2 record and 4.43 ERA with 35 strikeouts across 40 2/3 innings pitched. Endersby elected free agency following the season on November 4.

=== Charleston Dirty Birds ===
On February 1, 2025, Endersby signed with the Toros de Tijuana of the Mexican League. However, on February 25, Endersby signed with the Charleston Dirty Birds of the Atlantic League of Professional Baseball. In three starts for Charleston, he struggled to an 0-2 record and 11.32 ERA with seven strikeouts across 10 1/3 innings pitched. On May 24, Endersby was released by the Dirty Birds.

=== Leones de Yucatán ===
On May 27, 2025, Endersby signed with the Leones de Yucatán of the Mexican League. In seven appearances (four starts) for Yucatán, Endersby logged a 2-1 record and 4.70 ERA with 20 strikeouts over 23 innings of work.

=== Arizona Diamondbacks ===
On July 2, 2025, Endersby signed a minor league contract with the Arizona Diamondbacks organization. In eight appearances (six starts) split between the Double-A Amarillo Sod Poodles and Triple-A Reno Aces, he accumulated a 4-3 record and 2.32 ERA with 37 strikeouts across 42 2/3 innings pitched. Endersby was released by the Diamondbacks organization on September 12.

=== Kansas City Monarchs ===
On June 5, 2026, Endersby signed with the Kansas City Monarchs of the American Association of Professional Baseball.
