= Masters M40 800 metres world record progression =

This is the progression of world record improvements of the 800 metres M40 division of Masters athletics.

Key

Incomplete information Pending

Hand	Auto	Athlete	Nationality	Birthdate	Location	Date
	1:48.22	Anthony Whiteman	United Kingdom	13.11.1971	Indianapolis	06.06.2012
	1:48.81 i	Johnny Gray	United States	19.06.1960	Atlanta	02.03.2001
	1:50.34	Jim Sorensen	United States	10.05.1967	Bloomington	30.06.2007
	1:50.69	Colm J. Rothery	Ireland	28.01.1960	Stretford	05.09.2000
	1:51.25	Peter Browne	United Kingdom	03.02.1949	Ealing	19.08.1991
	1:51.52	Ronald Mercelina	Netherlands	18.04.1946	Heerhugowaard	24.09.1986
1:54.5		Klaus Mainka	Germany	12.03.1936		16.07.1977
