= Michael Pitre =

American football player and coach (born 1985)

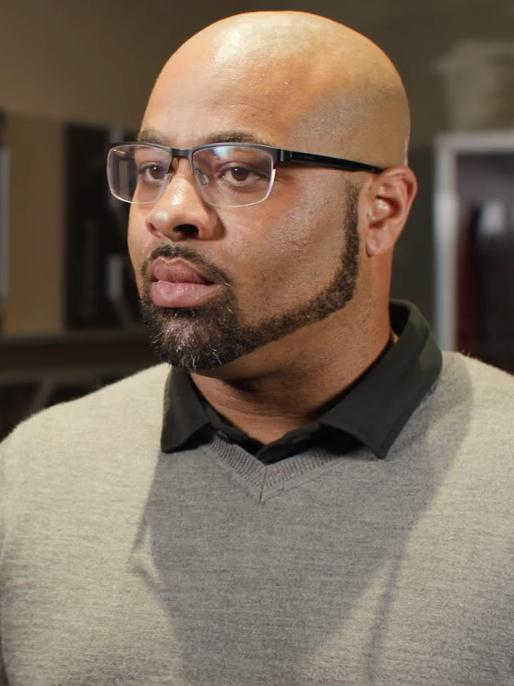
- Pitre in 2023

Atlanta Falcons
- Title: Running backs coach

Personal information
- Born: January 3, 1985 (age 41); Fontana, California, U.S.
- Listed height: 5 ft 11 in (1.80 m)
- Listed weight: 228 lb (103 kg)

Career information
- Position: Fullback
- High school: El Modena (Orange, California)
- College: UCLA

Career history
- Santa Margarita Catholic High School (2008) Running backs coach; Servite HS (2009–2011) Assistant coach; Colorado (2012–2013) Assistant coach; Montana State (2014–2017) Running backs coach; Oregon State (2018–2020) Running backs coach; Chicago Bears (2021) Running backs coach; Atlanta Falcons (2022–present) Running backs coach

Michael Jonathan Pitre (born January 3, 1985, in Fontana, California) is an American professional football coach and former player who is the running backs coach for the Atlanta Falcons of the National Football League (NFL). Pitre was previously the running backs coach for the Chicago Bears.

== College career ==
After graduating from El Modena High School, Pitre chose to attend UCLA. While at UCLA, Pitre played fullback, where he was a three-year starter and a team captain.

== Coaching career ==
After graduating from UCLA, Pitre coached at the high school level, becoming a coach for Rancho Santa Margarita and Servite High School. After four years at the high school level, Pitre became an assistant coach for Colorado.

Pitre would later become a running backs coach at the collegiate level, being hired for the position at Montana State.

After four years at Montana State, Pitre became the running backs coach at a higher level, becoming the running backs coach for Oregon State.

Following three years at Oregon State, Pitre would become a running backs coach for the Chicago Bears.

After one year with the Bears, Pitre was hired by Atlanta Falcons as the running backs coach under head coach, Arthur Smith, on January 31, 2022. Following the firing of Smith, new head coach, Raheem Morris, chose to keep Pitre at the same position on his coaching staff before the start of the 2024 season. Following the 2025 season and the firing of Morris, Pitre was retained after another regime change when new head coach, Kevin Stefanski, announced that Pitre would be kept on his staff in March 2026.
