= Michael Hartl =

American physicist and entrepreneur

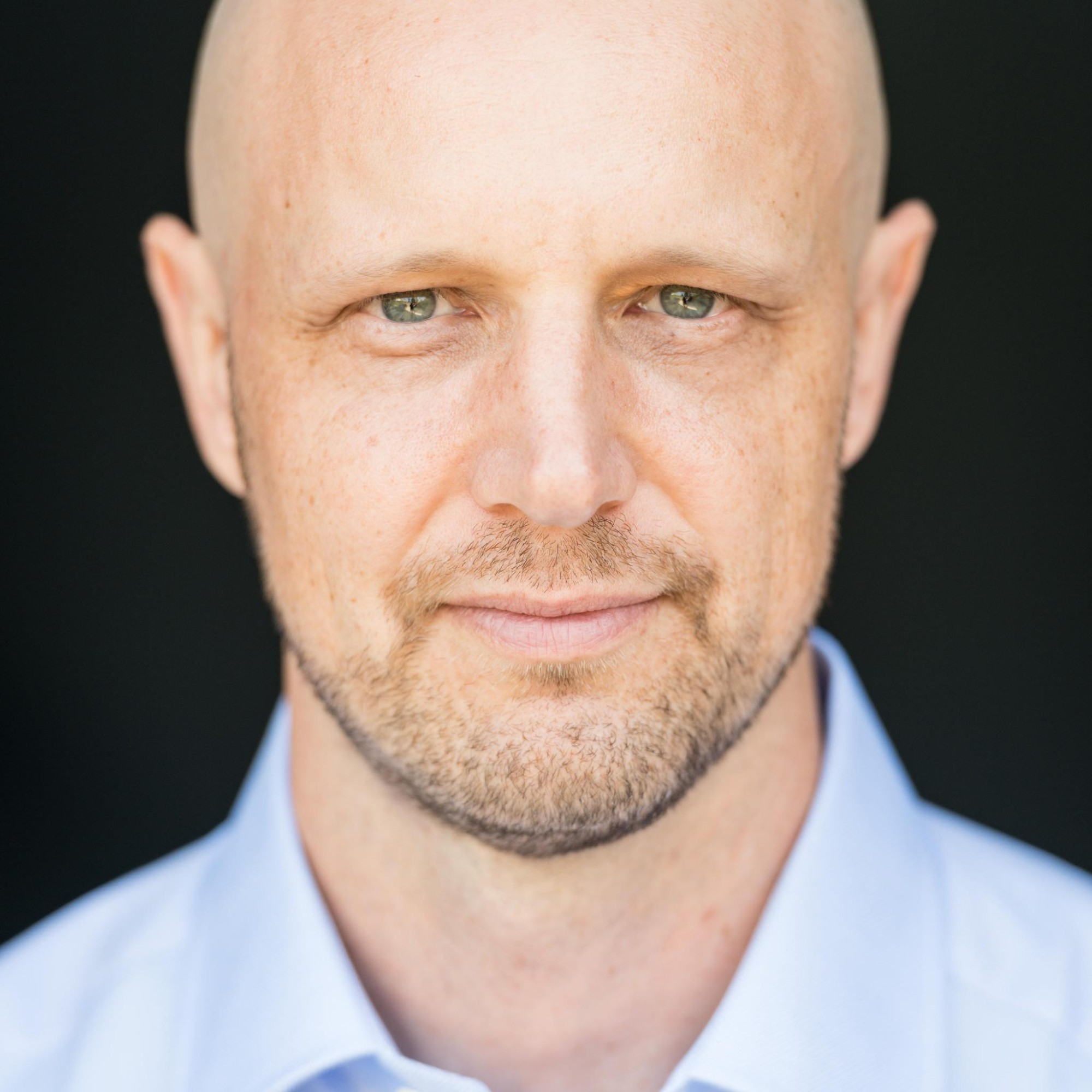
- Michael Hartl
- Born: United States
- Education: Harvard University, California Institute of Technology
- Occupations: Physicist, entrepreneur, writer
- Notable work: The Tau Manifesto
- Website: www.michaelhartl.com

Michael Hartl is an American physicist, author, and entrepreneur. He is best known as the creator of the Ruby on Rails Tutorial, founder of Tau Day, and author of The Tau Manifesto, in which he proposes replacing pi (π) with tau (τ).

== Education ==
Hartl graduated from El Modena High School in Orange, California. He then attended Harvard University for his undergraduate studies, graduating with a bachelor's degree in physics. Hartl obtained his PhD in Physics from the California Institute of Technology (Caltech) in 2003, where he researched black hole dynamics. His dissertation was titled Dynamics of Spinning Compact Binaries in General Relativity.

== Career ==
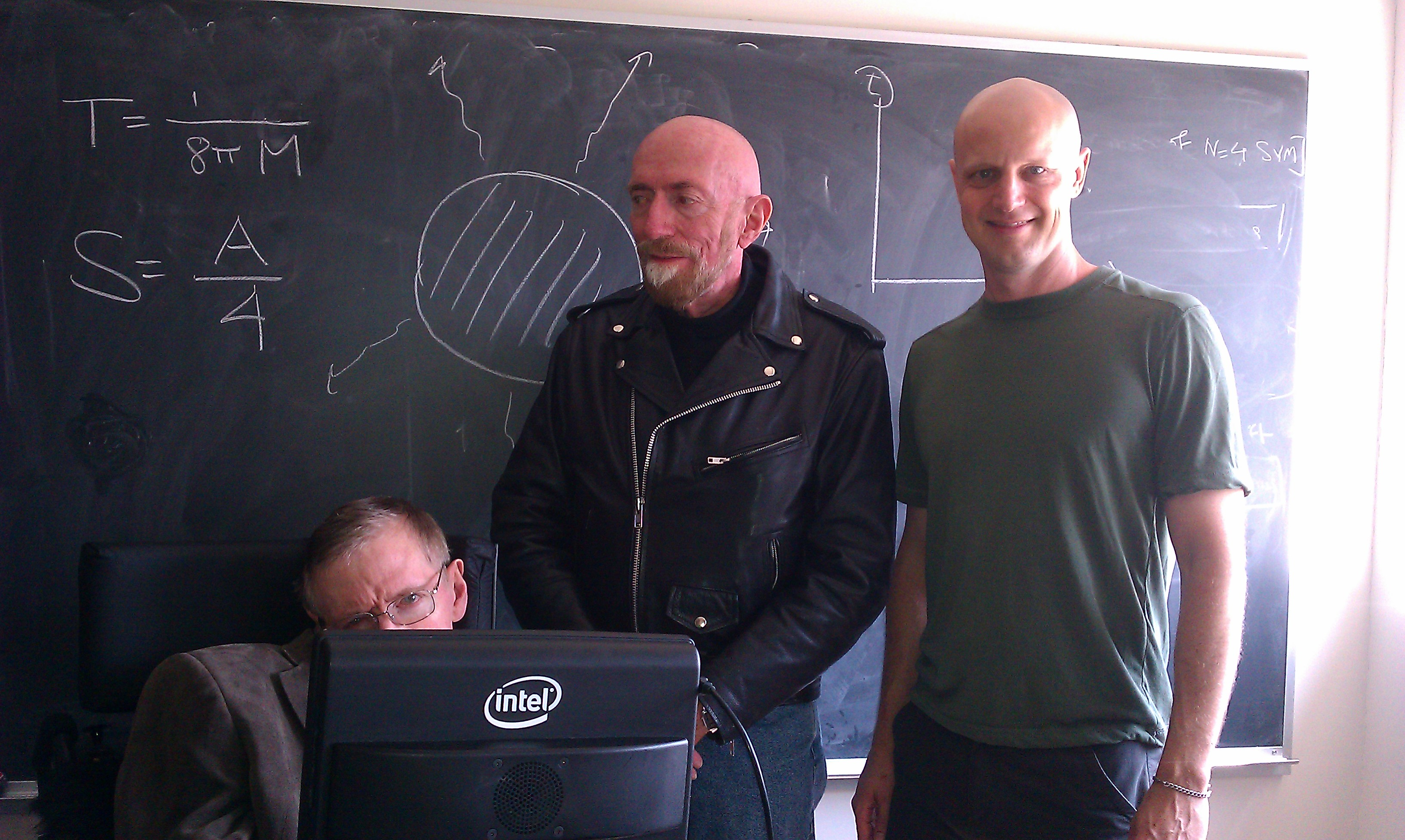
Michael Hartl with Kip Thorne and Stephen Hawking in 2012

After finishing his PhD, Hartl served as Caltech's editor on a corrected and expanded version of The Feynman Lectures on Physics at the request of Kip Thorne. Explaining in the preface why he chose Hartl for the task, Thorne noted that "Hartl understand physics deeply, he is among the most meticulous physicists I have known, and like Feynman he is an outstanding pedagogue." Thorne also noted that Hartl is the only Caltech graduate student to be granted a "lifetime achievement award for excellence in teaching" by Caltech's undergraduates.

As an entrepreneur, Hartl participated in the Y Combinator program in 2008. In 2010, he published the first edition of the Ruby on Rails Tutorial book and screencasts, which teach web development using the Ruby on Rails web application framework. The Ruby on Rails Tutorial quickly became both a critical and commercial success, eventually going through seven editions. In 2011, Hartl received a Ruby Hero Award for his service to the Ruby community, with the citation mentioning both the Ruby on Rails Tutorial and his first book, RailsSpace. In 2013, Wikipedia co-founder Jimmy Wales described the Ruby on Rails Tutorial as his "favorite book".

Hartl later co-founded the online education company Learn Enough to expand on the Ruby on Rails Tutorial, adding tutorials on other computer technologies and including online courses. In partnership with Pearson Education, Hartl authored or co-authored five books published under the brand Learn Enough to Be Dangerous. Learn Enough was acquired by a tech private equity group in 2022.

=== The Tau Manifesto ===
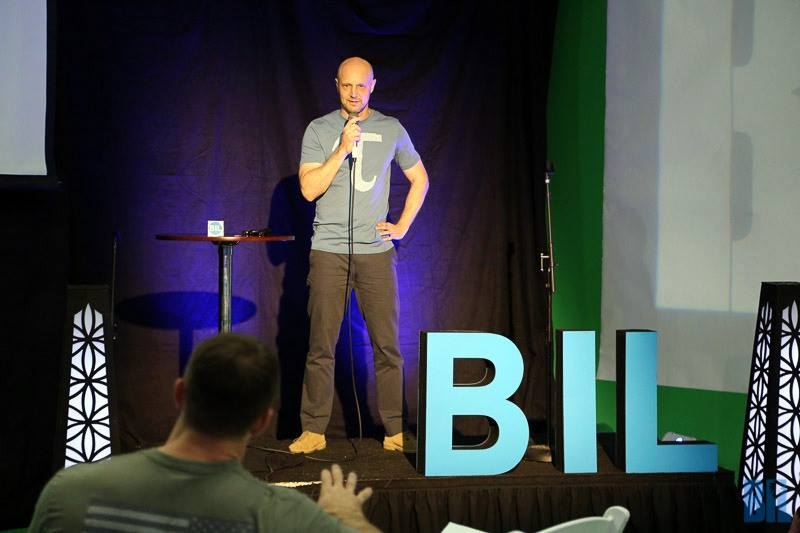
Michael Hartl speaking about tau at the BIL Conference in 2015

In 2010, Hartl published The Tau Manifesto, in which he proposed using the Greek letter tau to represent the circle constant τ = C/r = 2π, the first time tau was publicly proposed for this purpose. The Tau Manifesto proved popular, and a revised edition was published in 2019, followed by a print edition in 2021. As of 2022, The Tau Manifesto had been translated into seven different languages.

With the initial publication of The Tau Manifesto in 2010, Hartl founded Tau Day as a mathematical celebration and to promote adoption of the new constant. Observed annually on June 28, or 6/28 (in analogy with the celebration of Pi Day on 3/14), Tau Day has become a widely celebrated mathematical holiday. Hartl's constant has also seen significant adoption, including support for tau in the official Google calculator and inclusion in programming languages such as Microsoft.NET, Java, Rust, and Python. Notable supporters of tau and Tau Day include MIT, SLMath, Vi Hart, Vitalik Buterin, and Elon Musk (who named one of his children after the constant).

== Selected publications ==
=== Scientific articles ===
- Hartl, Michael D. (2003). "Lyapunov exponents in constrained and unconstrained ordinary differential equations". Phys. Rev. E. arXiv:physics/0303077. Bibcode:2003physics...3077H.
- Hartl, Michael D. (2003). "Dynamics of spinning test particles in Kerr spacetime". Physical Review D. 67 (2) 024005. arXiv:gr-qc/0210042. Bibcode:2003PhRvD..67b4005H. doi:10.1103/PhysRevD.67.024005. ISSN 0556-2821.
- Hartl, Michael D. (2003). "Survey of spinning test particle orbits in Kerr spacetime". Physical Review D. 67 (10) 104023. arXiv:gr-qc/0302103. Bibcode:2003PhRvD..67j4023H. doi:10.1103/PhysRevD.67.104023. ISSN 0556-2821.
- Hartl, Michael; Buonanno, Alessandra (2005). "Dynamics of precessing binary black holes using the post-Newtonian approximation". Physical Review D. 71 (2) 024027. arXiv:gr-qc/0407091. Bibcode:2005PhRvD..71b4027H. doi:10.1103/PhysRevD.71.024027. ISSN 1550-7998.

=== Books ===
- Hartl, Michael; Prochazka, Aurelius (2007). RailsSpace: Building a Social Networking Website with Ruby on Rails. Addison-Wesley Professional Ruby Series. ISBN 978-0-321-48079-8.
- Hartl, Michael (2022). Ruby on Rails Tutorial. Boston Columbus New York San Francisco Amsterdam Cape Town Dubai London Madrid Milan Munich Paris Montreal Toronto Delhi Mexico City Sao Paulo Sydney Hong Kong Seoul Singapore Taipei Tokyo: Addison-Wesley Professional Ruby Series. ISBN 978-0-13-804984-3.
- Hartl, Michael (2022). Learn Enough Developer Tools to Be Dangerous. Addison-Wesley Professional. ISBN 978-0-13-784345-9.
- Donahoe, Lee; Hartl, Michael (2022). Learn Enough HTML, CSS and Layout to Be Dangerous. ISBN 978-0-13-784310-7.
- Hartl, Michael (2022). Learn Enough JavaScript to Be Dangerous. Addison-Wesley Professional. ISBN 978-0-13-784374-9.
- Hartl, Michael (2022). Learn Enough Ruby to Be Dangerous. Addison-Wesley Professional. ISBN 978-0-13-784413-5.
- Hartl, Michael (2023). Learn Enough Python to Be Dangerous. Boston: Addison-Wesley Professional. ISBN 978-0-13-805095-5.
