= Masters M40 1500 metres world record progression =

This is the progression of world record improvements of the 1500 metres M40 division of Masters athletics.

Key

Incomplete information Pending Better indoor record

Hand	Auto	Athlete	Nationality	Birthdate	Location	Date	Ref
	3:40.20 i	Bernard Lagat	United States	12.12.1974	New York City	14.02.2015	
	3:41.87	Bernard Lagat	United States	12.12.1974	Birmingham	07.06.2015	
	3:42.02	Anthony Whiteman	GBR	13.11.1971	Stretford	07.07.2012	
	3:42.65	Vyacheslav Shabunin	RUS	27.09.1969	Sochi	27.05.2010	
	3:44.06	Jim Sorensen	United States	10.05.1967	Oxy	03.06.2007	
	3:44.89	Luiz José Gonçalves	BRA	04.12.1958	Rio de Janeiro	04.06.1999	
3:45.3 i		Eamonn Coghlan	IRL	24.11.1952	New York	26.02.1993	
3:46.7		David Moorcroft	GBR	10.04.1953	Belfast	19.06.1993	
	3:49.47	Wilson Waigwa	KEN	15.02.1949	Eugene	05.08.1989	
3:52.0		Michel Bernard	FRA	31.12.1931		20.06.1972	
