= Orange High School (Orange, California) =

Coordinates: 33.796201°N 117.847241°W

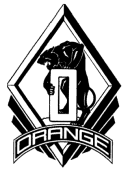
- 525 N. Shaffer St. Orange, CA 92867

Information
- Type: Public
- Established: 1903
- Principal: Sheryl Glass
- Teaching staff: 81.44 (FTE)
- Enrollment: 1,748 (2023-2024)
- Student to teacher ratio: 21.46
- Color
- Information: (714) 997-6211
- Mascot: Panther
- Website: Orange High School

Orange High School is a traditional four-year public high school located in the city of Orange, California. Orange High is part of the Orange Unified School District and competes in the Golden West League.

== History ==
Orange High School first opened on September 21, 1903 as Orange Union High School (using the Dobner Block on South Glassell as a temporary location). The first building for the new campus was completed in the summer of 1905 at Palm Ave. and Glassell St. in the city of Orange and first occupied in September of that year. Orange Union High was the county's fourth school.

In its first year, there were eighty six (86) students enrolled, specializing in four areas of study: Classical, Literary, Scientific, and English. In 1904, Helen Billingsley becomes the first graduate of Orange Union High School.

In 1953, Orange High School moved to its current location at 525 N. Shaffer St. (corner of N. Shaffer St. and Walnut Ave.) and its original location would eventually become the campus for Chapman University and be listed on the National Register of Historic Places.

Orange High is the oldest high school in the Orange Unified School District and currently serves downtown Orange, and small portions of southern Anaheim, eastern Garden Grove and northern Santa Ana.

== Campus ==
In 2016, voters passed Measure S, funding major modernization efforts across the Orange Unified School District campus. Phase 1 included the construction of a two-story, $52.4 million STEM complex that opened in November 2020. The facility houses 12 science classrooms and laboratories, as well as specialized living-skills learning spaces.

Phase 2 updates included a 26,000-square-foot student services and administration facility, which held its topping-out ceremony in September 2023. The building houses main administrative offices, student health and counseling resources, six classrooms, and the Townsend Room—a mini-museum displaying historic artifacts from the school's history. Campus renovations also added "Alumni Corner" at Walnut Avenue and Shaffer Street, featuring seating areas and landscaping designed to match the aesthetic of the nearby historic Orange Plaza.

== Sports ==
Orange High School's gymnasium, also known as "The Dome", was dedicated to Howard (HOD) E. Chambers in 1955.

In May 2011, Orange High's varsity baseball field was selected by the Baseball Tomorrow Fund and Major League Baseball Groundskeepers organization to be renovated. The new field was unveiled on Tuesday, January 10, 2012.

In 2018, the courts were upgraded, refinished, and dedicated by the Johnson family, long-time supporters of Orange High's tennis program.

In 2019, Orange High's athletic track and field (used by sports such as football, soccer, and track) were refinished and upgraded by the school district. Because of the construction projects going on that year, Orange High sports teams that utilized the athletic field spent a season competing at off-site venues.

== Academics ==
Orange High School is designated as an AVID (Advancement Via Individual Determination) National Demonstration School, implementing the college-preparatory program both in specific elective courses and schoolwide.

=== Visual and performing arts ===
==== Visual arts ====
Under the direction of art teacher Debbie Jollineau, students in the visual arts program have earned national and regional recognition. In 2016, Orange High School finished as a national runner-up in the Vans Custom Culture high school art competition, placing in the top five nationwide with a steampunk-themed shoe design. In 2019, an Orange High student received the grand prize in the Congressional Art Competition for California's 46th Congressional District. Graduates of the visual arts program have also gone on to careers in professional television animation, contributing as storyboard artists for animated series on networks including Nickelodeon.

==== Performing arts ====
The school's performing arts department includes both instrumental and vocal music programs. The Orange High School Panther Regiment marching band competes in the 1A/2A divisions of the Western Band Association (WBA) and the California State Band Championships (CSBC). Additionally, the school maintains concert and chamber choirs; under long-time director Michael Short, members of the chamber singers were featured as choir participants in the 1993 film Sister Act 2: Back in the Habit.

=== Extracurricular activities ===
The school's student organizations and performing groups maintain ties with the local community, frequently participating in civic events at the nearby Orange Plaza, including the annual May Day parade and Halloween celebrations.

=== University partnerships ===
Orange High School partners with nearby Chapman University for the Simon STEM Scholars Program. Established to support students pursuing careers in science, technology, engineering, and mathematics, the multi-year scholarship program selects five Orange High School students during their junior year to receive academic mentorship and a full scholarship to Chapman University upon graduation.

== Notable alumni ==
- Chuck Baker, professional baseball player
- Fred Kelly (1911), 1912 Olympic gold medalist in 110m high hurdles
- Bill Holman, Grammy Award winning composer, arranger
- Micah Knorr, NFL punter
- Mary Decker (1976), distance runner, 2-time world champion
- Gaddi Vasquez, Peace Corps Director and US Ambassador
- Danny Califf, professional soccer player
- Ali Kazemaini (1980), professional soccer league
- Dave Matranga, professional baseball player
- Pamela Courson, Jim Morrison's girlfriend
- Steve Johnson, professional tennis player, 2016 Olympic Medalist and 2-time NCAA singles champion
- Lorrin "Whitey" Harrison (1913–1993), surfing pioneer
- Patrick Saunders, basketball player
- Jimmy Endersby, baseball player
