= Anaheim Hills =

Planned community in California, United States

Anaheim East Anaheim
- District of Anaheim
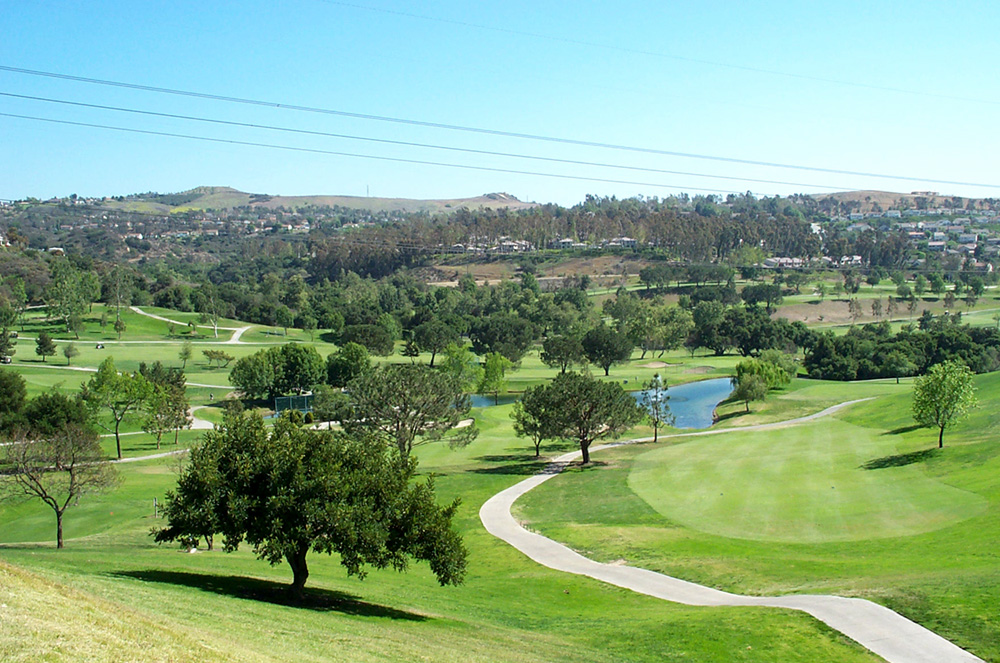
- A view of Anaheim Hills from the Anaheim Hills Golf Club

- Location within Anaheim and Northern Orange County Location within California
- Coordinates: 33°50′40″N 117°46′38″W
- Country: United States
- State: California
- County: Orange
- City: Anaheim
- Elevation: 410 ft (120 m)
- Time zone: UTC-8 (PST)
  - Summer (DST): UTC-7 (PDT)
- GNIS feature ID: 1951220

Anaheim Hills is a planned community encompassing the eastern portions of the city of Anaheim, in Orange County, California.

== History ==
Prior to the development, a few scattered low-density neighborhoods existed in the area, including Peralta Hills and Mohler Loop (tracts that still exist today) that were developed primarily in the 1940s and 1950s. The remaining portions of Anaheim Hills were primarily developed in the 1970s after rancher and land owner Louis Nohl sold his massive parcel in the foothills east of Anaheim. The area was taken over by Texaco Industries in 1970 when the company announced plans to develop an expansive and upscale master planned community of 7,000 homes, estates, and townhomes. The original master plan included a proposal for three new lakes with high-density condominiums clustered around these water features. The initial master plan proved unsustainable due to the topography and geology of the area. Construction of the community began in 1971 and was branded as a rural enclave and alternative to the more dense subdivisions emerging in the Orange County basin with homes on large lots, hiking trails, a golf course, and low densities. Anaheim Hills is the first residential development to utilize "Landform Grading." The community grew quickly and by 1974 the Orange Unified School District had constructed a high school to serve the growing community. In 1990, the city of Anaheim approved several large developments surrounding Weir Canyon Road (East Hills and The Highlands), expanding the community toward the 241 toll road. In 2007, the Irvine Company received approval for additional 2,500 homes just east of the 241 toll road on a parcel of land it has owned for over fifty years. However, in 2014 The Irvine Company donated the land for these additional 2,500 homes to the County of Orange to be preserved as open space.

== Geography ==
Anaheim Hills is located just south of Yorba Linda, California, opposite the 91 freeway at Imperial Highway. The western border is the 55 freeway opposite the city of Orange, California. On the northeast side the community extends past Gypsum Canyon, bordered by unincorporated areas of Orange County and Cleveland National Forest. To the east lies more unincorporated national forest. To the south is Santiago Oaks Regional Park, stewarded by OC Parks, and the Santa Ana foothills opposite the community of Villa Park, California. The entirety of Anaheim Hills is within the city limits of Anaheim, California.

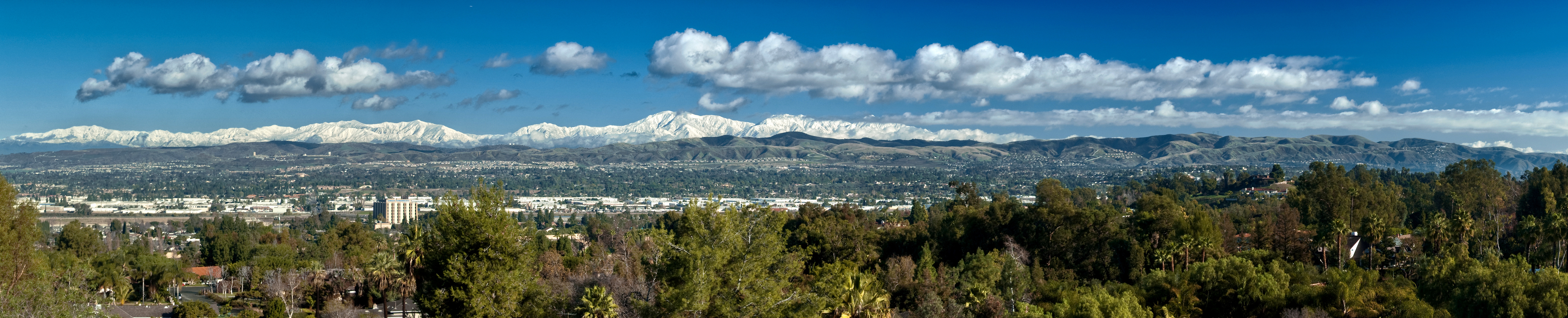
View North

=== Neighborhoods ===
Anaheim Hills consists of several planned neighborhoods, including the following:

- Amber Lane
- Anaheim Foothills
- Anaheim Ridge Estates
- Bauer Ranch
- Belsomet
- Camino Grande Villas
- Canyon Heights
- Canyon View Estates
- Canyon Hills
- Canyon Pointe
- Canyon Rim/Sunset Ridge
- Canyon Terrace
- Canyon Terrace Estates
- Canyon Terrace Townhomes
- Canyon View Estates
- Canyon View Terrace
- Cape Cod Village
- Carriage Hills
- Crown Pointe
- Carriage Hills
- Copa De Oro
- Embassy Pointe
- East Hills
- Eastridge Estates
- Feather Hill
- Firenze
- Galerie
- Haven Hill
- Hidden Canyon Estates
- Horizons
- Hunters Pointe
- Kings Meadow
- Lake Summit
- Monaco
- Morningview
- Mohler Loop
- Mountain Park
- Nohl Crest
- Old Bridge
- Quail Ridge
- Oak Hills
- Peralta Hills
- Pointe Quissett
- Prado Ridge Estates
- Prado Woods
- Quail Ridge
- Quail Vista
- Renaissance
- Ridgeview
- Rim Crest Villas
- Robin Hill I
- Robin Hill II
- Rocky Point
- Royal Circle Village
- Scout Trail
- Silverbrook Estates
- Singingwood Hills
- Skygate
- Stonegate Hills
- Summer Creek Lane
- Summit Pointe
- Summit Renaissance
- Summit Springs
- Summit Terrace
- Sunset Ridge
- Sycamore Canyon
- The Highlands
- The Summit
- The Palms
- Windsor Terrace
- View Pointe
- Vista Del Sol
- Village at Fiesole
- Villa Palatino
- Window Hill
- Windsor Terrace
- Westridge
- Woodsboro
- Yorba Woods

== Government ==
=== Local ===
The 92807 ZIP code serves the western portion and other parts of East Anaheim while the 92808 ZIP code serves the eastern portion, and although residents typically identify themselves as living in the community of "Anaheim Hills" (as opposed to the city of "Anaheim"), the United States Postal Service considers both Anaheim and Anaheim Hills. Anaheim Hills is served by Anaheim Fire Department Stations 9 and 10. The community is served by two of the City of Anaheim's libraries, the Canyon Hills Library and the East Hills Library.

23 community associations are within Anaheim Hills, led by the Anaheim Hills Planned Community Association, which oversees the entire community of Anaheim Hills. Two councils represent the community, the Canyon Hills Community Council and the Anaheim Hills Citizens Coalition.

The community is listed under the Canyon and Hill General Plan Designations within the City of Anaheim, and thus the "Canyon Hills" name designated to the area for several of the sports teams located within the area.

=== State and federal ===
Anaheim Hills is in California's 40th congressional district, which is represented in the United States House of Representatives by Republican Young Kim. In the California State Legislature, the community is represented by Senator Dave Min (a Democrat from the 37th Senate District) and Assemblyman Phillip Chen (a Republican from the 59th Assembly District. On the Orange County Board of Supervisors, Anaheim Hills is represented by the 3rd District's Donald P. Wagner. In 2016, the City of Anaheim adopted City Council Districts, with Anaheim Hills making up the majority of the 6th District. In 2018, small-businessman Trevor O'Neil was elected to represent the 6th District.

== Education ==
Students who live in the Anaheim Hills area are either directed to the Orange Unified School District or the Placentia-Yorba Linda Unified School District (houses that are north of the Santa Ana River and California State Route 91, but part of the city of Anaheim). Nearby public community colleges include Santiago Canyon College, Orange Coast College, Cypress College, Santa Ana College, Irvine Valley College, and Fullerton College. The nearest public four-year universities are California State University, Fullerton, and University of California, Irvine.

=== Elementary schools ===
- Anaheim Hills Elementary School
- Canyon Rim Elementary School
- Crescent Elementary School
- Imperial Elementary School
- Nohl Canyon Elementary School
- Running Springs Elementary School
- Woodsboro Elementary School

=== Middle schools ===
- Bernardo Yorba Middle School
- El Rancho Charter School

=== High schools ===
- Canyon High School
- Esperanza High School

=== Specialty schools ===
- Canyon Hills School
- Fairmont Private
- Hillsborough Private
- Hephatha School

== Notable people ==
- Carlos Cavazo - Guitarist (Quiet Riot, Ratt)
- Brandon Baker, actor
- Michael Bisping, MMA fighter
- Ashley Benson, actress
- Rebecca Black, teen pop singer
- Mike Brown, Former Los Angeles Lakers Head Coach
- Rod Carew, former Major League Baseball player and 1991 Baseball Hall of Fame inductee
- Danielle Fishel, actress
- Ashley Force, drag racer
- Ken Forsch, former Major League Baseball pitcher and assistant General Manager of the Los Angeles Angels of Anaheim
- Michael Franzese, former caporegime in the Colombo crime family
- Jim Fregosi, former Los Angeles Angels player and Philadelphia Phillies manager
- Robby Gordon, NASCAR and off-road racer
- Grant Green, former USC Trojans and current Minor League Baseball player.
- Vladimir Guerrero, former Anaheim Angels player and 2018 Baseball Hall of Fame inductee
- Schae Harrison, soap opera actress
- Casey Janssen, Major League Baseball player for the Toronto Blue Jays
- Deacon Jones, former Los Angeles Rams football player
- Gene Kan, creator of infrasearch.com
- Adam Kennedy, Major League Baseball player
- Young Kim, U.S. representative and former state assemblywoman
- Kerry King, founder of the thrash metal band Slayer
- David C. Leestma, NASA astronaut
- Anthony Maglica, owner, founder of Maglite
- Courtney Mathewson, 2016 and 2012 Olympic Gold Medalist
- Alli Mauzey, actress, "Wicked"
- Donnie Moore, deceased Major League Baseball relief pitcher
- Chuck Norris, actor
- Jefferson Thomas, former accountant for the United States Department of Defense
- Eric Valent, former Major League Baseball player for the Philadelphia Phillies and New York Mets
- Cam York, National Hockey League defenceman for the Philadelphia Flyers

== Natural disasters ==
Landslides and wildfires have occurred in Anaheim Hills during recent years. Santa Ana Winds are a major factor in fueling the wildfires in the area.

=== Landslides ===
A landslide in January 1993, destroyed over 30 homes and impacted over 200 others.

During the winter of 2005, a twenty-day rain event in Orange County led to not only flooding, but a landslide that caused the unstable hillside along the street of Ramsgate Drive to give way. Three homes and a private street were destroyed in the landslide.

=== Wildfires ===
==== 1982 Gypsum Canyon ====
The first major wildfire since the development of Anaheim Hills occurred in October 1982. Santa Ana Winds drove a fire that ended up causing $50 million in property damage. The fire burned 17,000 acres (69 km^{2}) and destroyed 14 homes.

==== 2006 Sierra Peak ====
A wildfire broke out on February 7, 2006, in the Cleveland National Forest, the National Forest that separates Anaheim Hills from the Riverside County Border. This fire grew and firefighters were unable to contain it due to 20 mph (32 km/h) winds and 80 °F (27 °C) temperatures. On the morning of February 9, 2006, the fire worsened, which forced the evacuation of a large section of Anaheim Hills. Nearly 75% of the Community of Anaheim Hills was either under voluntary or mandatory evacuation. This resulted in the closing of two local elementary schools for two days, and several other schools served as shelters for the evacuees during the day.

The fire burned over 10,000 acres (40 km^{2}) of land and caused significant natural resource damage by burning a recovering Tecate cypress grove. It was later determined that a controlled blaze set by the Cleveland National Forest started the fire, and the National Forestry Service was forced to pay the cost from the firefighting efforts.

==== 2007 Windy Ridge ====
On Sunday, March 11, 2007, at 07:53 AM (PST), a fire possibly started by a stolen vehicle on the southbound 241 Windy Ridge Toll Plaza, destroyed over 2,000 acres (8.1 km^{2}) in Anaheim Hills and the city of Orange. Due to winds moving as fast as 35 mph (56 km/h), an estimated 2,500 homes were evacuated, with 2 injuries reported.

==== 2008 Freeway Complex ====
The Freeway Complex Fire broke out in the Corona area at around 9am on Saturday, November 15, 2008, which burned south-westerly into Anaheim Hills, forcing the immediate evacuation of 3,100 homes in the Weir Canyon area. In total, more than 200 residences were destroyed by the fire, of which fourteen houses and 86 apartments were burned within Anaheim Hills.

==== 2017 Canyon Fire 2 ====
On October 8, 2017, the Canyon Fire 2 broke out near the interchange for California State Route 91 and California State Route 241 on the border of the City of Anaheim. The Canyon Fire 2 was the second fire in the same area in a matter of weeks, the first fire was designated the Canyon Fire.

Canyon Fire 2 was driven by fast moving winds and low humidity. By noon on the day the fire began, it had burned 800 acres (1.3 sq mi). By 2:30, fueled by high winds and low humidity, it had burned 2,000 acres (3.1 sq mi) and was 0 percent contained.

Canyon Fire 2 led to the evacuation of 16,570 residents of Anaheim, Orange, North Tustin, Orange Park Acres and Tustin and the destruction of 25 homes located in Anaheim Hills and Orange.
