= Orange Unified School District =

School district in California, U.S.

Address
- 1401 North Handy Street Orange, California, 92867; United States

District information
- Type: Public
- Grades: PK–12
- Established: 1953
- Superintendent: Rachel H. Monarrez, PhD

Other information
- Website: www.orangeusd.org

Orange Unified School District (OUSD) is a public school district headquartered in Orange, California.

Orange USD serves the cities of Orange and Villa Park, the unincorporated land of Silverado, and parts of Anaheim, Garden Grove, Santa Ana, and Yorba Linda. Its student enrollment during the 2004–2005 school year was approximately around the number 31,600.

== History ==
The Orange Unified School District was formed in 1953, when citizens in the City of Orange voted to form a school district, which combined five elementary districts with one high school district.

In 2003, Orange USD gave territory to the Tustin Unified School District.

== District Schools ==
The district operates 26 elementary schools, 5 middle schools, 4 high schools, a continuation high school, a K-8 math and science magnet school and two special schools. Nineteen of its forty-one schools have been recognized as California Distinguished Schools. Three of its high schools are consistently listed among Newsweek's 1,000 Best Public High Schools in America. Some elementary and middle schools within the district also continue to achieve above average standardized test scores and national distinctions, while others are state designated Underperforming Schools under No Child Left Behind Act's sanctions. Generally, its highest performing schools are in the Anaheim Hills area where all schools have been named California Distinguished Schools and constantly rank among the best schools in the county, while schools in the City of Orange tend to have lower standardized test scores.

=== High schools ===
- Canyon High School
- El Modena High School
- Orange High School
- Villa Park High School

=== Middle schools ===
- Cerro Villa Middle School
- El Rancho Charter School
- Portola Middle School
- Santiago Prep Charter Academy
- Yorba Middle School
- McPherson Magnet School

=== Elementary schools ===
- Anaheim Hills Elementary School
- California Elementary School
- Crescent Elementary
- Cambridge Elementary School
- Canyon Rim Elementary School
- Chapman Hills Elementary School
- Crescent (formerly Peralta) Intermediate School
- Crescent Primary School
- Esplanade Elementary School
- Fairhaven Elementary School
- Fletcher Elementary School
- Handy Elementary School
- Imperial Elementary School
- Jordan Elementary School
- La Veta Elementary School
- Lampson Elementary School
- Linda Vista Elementary School
- McPherson Magnet School
- Nohl Canyon Elementary School
- Olive Elementary School
- Palmyra Elementary School
- Panorama Elementary School
- Prospect Elementary School
- Running Springs Elementary School
- Serrano Elementary School
- Sycamore Elementary School
- Taft Elementary School
- Villa Park Elementary School
- West Orange Elementary School

=== Special schools ===
- Canyon Hills School
- Parkside School
- Richland High School

== Board of education ==
- Trustee Area 1 Andrea Yamasaki
- Trustee Area 2 John Ortega
- Trustee Area 3 Ana Page, president
- Trustee Area 4 Sara Pelly
- Trustee Area 5 Kristen Erickson, clerk
- Trustee Area 6 Angie Rumsey, vice president
- Trustee Area 7 Dr. Stephen Glass

== Gay-Straight Alliance (Colin ex rel. Colin v. Orange Unified School District) ==
In 1999, the Orange Unified School District voted unanimously to prohibit the formation of a Gay-Straight Alliance at El Modena High School. The students sued the school board, claiming that their rights under the First Amendment and the 1984 Equal Access Act had been violated. In the first-ever ruling of its kind, Judge David O. Carter of the United States District Court for the Central District of California issued a preliminary injunction ordering the school to allow the GSA to meet. After a settlement was agreed upon, the students were allowed to meet and were given access to school resources equal to all other campus clubs.
