= Tau (mathematics) =

Constant equal to twice pi

tau
- Rationality: irrational
- Symbol: τ

Representations
- Decimal: 6.28318531...
- Algebraic form: 2π

An arc of a circle with the same length as the radius of that circle corresponds to an angle of 1 radian. A full circle corresponds to a full turn, or approximately 6.28 radians, which is expressed here using the Greek letter tau (τ).

A comparison of angles expressed in degrees and radians

The number τ (/ˈtaʊ, ˈtɔː, ˈtɒ/; spelled out as tau) is a mathematical constant, equal to 2π, that has been proposed as an alternative to π by various proponents, who argue that mathematical notation would be simpler, clearer or pedagogically preferable if formulas and quantities (including angles) were described in terms of τ instead of π. A constant named tau is implemented in some programming languages and calculator apps as an alias for 2π. τ is approximately equal to

6.2831853071795864769252867665590057683943387987502116419...

It is the ratio of a circle's circumference to its radius, whereas π instead corresponds to the ratio of a circle's circumference to its diameter. Like π, τ can be defined in several other equivalent ways: notably, τ is equal to the period of the complex exponential function. Like π, τ is irrational and transcendental.

While π is used almost exclusively in mainstream mathematical education and practice, it has been proposed in recent decades, most notably by physicist Michael Hartl in his 2010 article The Tau Manifesto, that τ should be used instead. Hartl and other proponents argue that τ is the more natural circle constant and its use leads to conceptually simpler and more intuitive mathematical notation; in particular, τ is the angle measure of a whole turn in radians, whereas π corresponds only to a half-turn, so proponents argue that angles in radians are more intuitive when expressed as fractions of τ compared to π.

Critics have responded that the benefits of using τ over π are trivial and that given the ubiquity and historical significance of π a change is unlikely to occur.

The proposal did not initially gain widespread acceptance in the mathematical community, but awareness of τ has become more widespread, including having been added to several major programming languages and calculators.

== Fundamentals ==
=== Geometric definitions ===
The number τ can be defined as the ratio of the circumference to the radius of a circle:
$$\tau = \frac{\mbox{circumference}}{\mbox{radius}}.$$
(The ratio circumference/radius is constant regardless of the circle's size, designating τ as the fixed ratio between the circumference and the radius of any circle.)

The ratio of a circle's circumference to its radius can be related to the number π:
$$\pi = \frac{\mbox{circumference}}{\mbox{diameter}} = \frac{\mbox{circumference}}{2 \cdot \mbox{radius}} = \frac{\tau}{2},$$
showing that τ equals 2π. Accordingly, the number τ shares many of the properties of π, including being a transcendental number and hence also irrational.

Some special angles in radians, stated in terms of τ

When radians are used as the unit of angular measure, there are τ radians in one full turn of a circle, and fractions of τ correspond (in radians) to angles that are the same fractions of a turn: for instance, 1/8τ rad is an eighth of a turn; 3/4τ rad is three-quarters of a turn.

=== Other definitions ===
Like π, τ can also be defined analytically, in terms of integrals, series or trigonometric functions.

τ can be defined as the smallest positive real number x such that cos(x) = 1, or as the period of the sine and cosine functions. Equivalently, τ can be defined as the period of the complex exponential function, which shares the same period as the sine and cosine functions as shown by Euler's formula. (The sine, cosine and exponential functions themselves can be defined independently of geometry using Taylor series, allowing to define τ without any reference to circles or geometry.)

Other formulas equal to τ include integrals such as $\textstyle \int_{-2}^{2} \sqrt{4 - x^2} \, dx$ (which is half the area of a circle of radius 2), or sums of infinite series, such as the Gregory series:
$$\tau = 8 \sum_{n=0}^\infty \frac{(-1)^{n}}{2n+1} = 8 - \frac{8}{3} + \frac{8}{5} - \frac{8}{7} + \frac{8}{9}...$$
More series definitions can be found at List of formulae involving π.

=== Digits of τ ===
The first 51 decimal digits of τ are: 6.28318530717958647692528676655900576839433879875021...

They constitute the sequence A019692 in the OEIS.

== History ==
The use of τ or of other dedicated symbols for 2π in lieu of π has been advocated by several mathematicians and other proponents in recent decades. The number 6.28... has been historically studied and denoted by various symbols, but in the 18th century, π became the universally-understood symbol for 3.14... instead.

=== τ notation proposal ===
The proposal to use the Greek letter τ as a circle constant representing 2π dates to Michael Hartl's 2010 publication, The Tau Manifesto, (Note: Original version, current version) although the symbol had been independently suggested earlier by Joseph Lindenburg (c. 1990), John Fisher (2004) and Peter Harremoës (2010).

Hartl offered two reasons for the choice of notation. First, τ is the number of radians in one turn, and both τ and turn begin with a /t/ sound. Second, τ visually resembles π, whose association with the circle constant is unavoidable. Moreover, Hartl asserted that the use of a familiar Greek letter like τ was preferable to the choice of a completely new symbol (like Bob Palais' proposed symbol $\pi\!\;\!\!\!\pi$), since people would be immediately able to pronounce it when they encounter it.

=== Earlier proposals ===
There had been a number of earlier proposals for a new circle constant equal to 2π, together with varying suggestions for its name and symbol.

In 2001, Dr. Bob Palais of the University of Utah asserted that π is "wrong" as the fundamental circle constant and that 2π was the proper value. He proposed using a "π with three legs" symbol to denote the constant ($\pi\!\;\!\!\!\pi = 2\pi$), and referred to angles as fractions of a "turn" ($\tfrac 1 4 \pi\!\;\!\!\!\pi = \tfrac 1 4\,\mathrm{turn}$). Palais stated that the word "turn" served as both the name of the new constant and a reference to the ordinary language meaning of turn.

In 2008, Robert P. Crease proposed defining a constant as the ratio of circumference to radius, an idea supported by John Horton Conway, who is cited to have said that "2π is obviously the correct constant".

The same year, Thomas Colignatus proposed the uppercase Greek letter theta, Θ, to represent 2π due to its visual resemblance of a circle. For a similar reason another proposal suggested the Phoenician and Hebrew letter teth, 𐤈 or ט, (from which the letter theta was derived), due to its connection with wheels and circles in ancient cultures.

=== Historical use of other symbols to represent 6.28... ===
The number 6.28... has been studied historically long before contemporary proposals to name it τ. In 1424, Jamshid al-Kashi computed the number 6.28... to 9 sexagesimal (base 60) digits. The first 16 sexagesimal digits of τ are: 6;16,59,28,1,34,51,46,14,49,55,12,35,26,8,58,..

The meaning of the symbol π was not originally defined as the ratio of circumference to diameter, and at times was used in representations of the constant 6.28... .

Early works in circle geometry used the letter π to designate the perimeter (i.e., circumference) in different fractional representations of circle constants and in 1697 David Gregory used π/ρ (pi over rho) to denote the perimeter divided by the radius (6.28...).

Subsequently π came to be used as a single symbol to represent the ratios in whole. Leonhard Euler initially used the single letter π to denote the constant 6.28... in his 1727 Essay Explaining the Properties of Air. Euler would later use the letter π for 3.14... in his 1736 Mechanica and 1748 Introductio in analysin infinitorum, though defined as half the circumference of a circle of radius 1 rather than the ratio of circumference to diameter. Elsewhere in Mechanica, Euler instead used the letter π for one-fourth of the circumference of a unit circle, or 1.57... . Usage of the letter π, sometimes for 3.14... and other times for 6.28..., became widespread, with the convention varying as late as 1761; afterward, the use of π for 3.14... exclusively became standard, as a result of the influence of Euler's later works.

== Notation using τ ==
Proponents argue that while use of τ in place of 2π does not change any of the underlying mathematics, it does lead to simpler and more intuitive notation in many areas. Michael Hartl's Tau Manifesto gives many examples of formulas that are asserted to be clearer where τ is used instead of π.

=== Units of angle ===
Hartl and Robert Palais have argued that τ allows angles to be expressed more directly and in a way that makes clear the link between the radian measure and rotation around the unit circle.

Since an angle (in radians) of $\tau$ corresponds to a turn, an angle (in radians) given as a fraction of $\tau$ corresponds to the same fraction of a turn. (This is not the case if the angle is expressed as a fraction of $\pi$ instead, in which case it would correspond to the same fraction of a half-turn, not of a whole turn.) For instance, 3/4τ rad can be easily interpreted as 3/4 of a turn, in contrast with the same angle written as 3/2π rad, where the meaning could be less intuitive. For this reason, Hartl has argued that the use of π in mathematical education is pedagogically detrimental, and that using τ would improve clarity in mathematical teaching regarding trigonometry and radians.

Critics have responded that a full rotation is not necessarily the correct or fundamental reference measure for angles and two other possibilities, the right angle and straight angle, each have historical precedent. Euclid used the right angle as the basic unit of angle, and David Butler has suggested that 1/4τ = 1/2π ≈ 1.57, which he denotes with the Greek letter η (eta), should be seen as the fundamental circle constant.

=== Trigonometric functions ===
Plots of common trigonometric functions (sin, cos, tan, cot, sec, csc) with x-axis running from −τ through +τ

Hartl has argued that the periodic trigonometric functions are simplified when using τ, as it corresponds to the period of the sine and cosine functions: sin repeats with period T = τ, reaches a maximum at 1/4T = 1/4τ and a minimum at 3/4T = 3/4τ. (By contrast, π is only half the period of the $\sin$ and $\cos$ functions.)

More generally, given constants $\omega$ and $\phi$, a sinusoidal function of the form $t \mapsto \cos(\omega t + \phi)$ or $t \mapsto \sin(\omega t + \phi)$ has the period $T=\frac{\tau}{\omega}$, and the number of periods in each interval of length 1 is $f=\frac{1}{T}=\frac{\omega}{\tau}$. Here, $\omega$ can be interpreted as an angular frequency and $f$ as a rotational frequency.

As a result, in contexts related to sinusoidal waves or periodic rotation, $\tau=2\pi$ is the conversion factor between quantities corresponding to numbers of turns or periods (i.e. frequencies) and quantities corresponding to numbers of radians or phase units (i.e. angular frequencies). For instance:

- angular frequency $\omega$ is equal to τ times the rotational frequency $f$ (or, equivalently, to τ divided by the period duration $T$);
- angular wavenumber $k$ is equal to τ times the ordinary wavenumber $\tilde{\nu}$ (or, equivalently, to τ divided by the spatial period $\lambda$).

The following table shows particular values of the sin, cos and tan functions, for arguments expressed in terms of τ:

$$\begin{alignat}{3}
\sin\left(\frac{\tau}{16}\right) &= \frac{\sqrt{2-\sqrt{2}}}{2} &\qquad
\cos\left(\frac{\tau}{16}\right) &= \frac{\sqrt{2+\sqrt{2}}}{2} &\qquad
\tan\left(\frac{\tau}{16}\right) &= \sqrt{2}-1 \\[0.6em]
\sin\left(\frac{\tau}{12}\right) &= \frac{1}{2} &\qquad
\cos\left(\frac{\tau}{12}\right) &= \frac{\sqrt{3}}{2} &\qquad
\tan\left(\frac{\tau}{12}\right) &= \frac{1}{\sqrt{3}} \\[0.6em]
\sin\left(\frac{\tau}{10}\right) &= \frac{\sqrt{10-2\sqrt{5}}}{4} &\qquad
\cos\left(\frac{\tau}{10}\right) &= \frac{\sqrt{5}+1}{4} &\qquad
\tan\left(\frac{\tau}{10}\right) &= \sqrt{5-2\sqrt{5}} \\[0.6em]
\sin\left(\frac{\tau}{8}\right) &= \frac{1}{\sqrt{2}} &\qquad
\cos\left(\frac{\tau}{8}\right) &= \frac{1}{\sqrt{2}} &\qquad
\tan\left(\frac{\tau}{8}\right) &= 1 \\[0.6em]
\sin\left(\frac{\tau}{6}\right) &= \frac{\sqrt{3}}{2} &\qquad
\cos\left(\frac{\tau}{6}\right) &= \frac{1}{2} &\qquad
\tan\left(\frac{\tau}{6}\right) &= \sqrt{3} \\[0.6em]
\sin\left(\frac{\tau}{5}\right) &= \frac{\sqrt{10+2\sqrt{5}}}{4} &\qquad
\cos\left(\frac{\tau}{5}\right) &= \frac{\sqrt{5}-1}{4} &\qquad
\tan\left(\frac{\tau}{5}\right) &= \sqrt{5+2\sqrt{5}} \\[0.6em]
\sin\left(\frac{\tau}{4}\right) &= 1 &\qquad
\cos\left(\frac{\tau}{4}\right) &= 0 &\qquad
\tan\left(\frac{\tau}{4}\right) &\text{ is undefined (or ∞)} \\[0.6em]
\sin\left(\frac{\tau}{3}\right) &= \frac{\sqrt{3}}{2} &\qquad
\cos\left(\frac{\tau}{3}\right) &= \frac{-1}{2} &\qquad
\tan\left(\frac{\tau}{3}\right) &= -\sqrt{3} \\[0.6em]
\sin\left(\frac{\tau}{2}\right) &= 0 &\qquad
\cos\left(\frac{\tau}{2}\right) &= -1 &\qquad
\tan\left(\frac{\tau}{2}\right) &= 0 \\[0.6em]
\sin(\tau) &= 0 &\qquad
\cos(\tau) &= 1 &\qquad
\tan(\tau) &= 0
\end{alignat}$$

=== Area of a circle ===
Critics have argued that the formula for the area of a circle A = πr^{2} is more complicated when restated as A = 1/2τr^{2}. Hartl and others have responded that the 1/2 factor is meaningful, arising from either integration or geometric proofs for the area of a circle as half the circumference times the radius. Moreover, Hartl has argued that 1/2τr^{2} can be seen as a special case of the more general formula 1/2θr^{2} for the area of a circular sector spanned by the angle θ when θ is taken to be τ (a whole turn).

=== Euler's identity and roots of unity ===
Euler's identity, e^{iπ} + 1 = 0, sometimes claimed to be "the most beautiful theorem in mathematics", becomes e^{iτ/2} + 1 = 0 in terms of $\tau$. Hartl has asserted that e^{iτ} = 1 (which he also called "Euler's identity") is a more fundamental and meaningful equation.

John Conway noted that Euler's identity is a specific case of the general formula of the nth roots of unity, ^{n}√1 = e^{iτk/n} (k = 1, 2, ..., n), which he maintained is preferable and more economical than Euler's identity.

=== Higher-dimensional spheres and balls ===
While τ corresponds to the circumference of a unit circle in a two-dimensional Euclidean plane, the situation is more complicated in higher dimensions, where the formulas for the volume and surface area of a hypersphere in higher-dimensional Euclidean spaces involve fractions and powers of π (or τ).

For a given integer n, the following formulas yield the generalized volume $V_n$ and surface area $S_{n-1}$ of a n-dimensional unit hypersphere (in n-dimensional Euclidean space):

$${\displaystyle
S_{n-1} = \frac{2 \pi^{n/2}}{\Gamma\bigl(\frac{n}{2}\bigr)} = \frac{(\frac{\pi}{2})^{\lfloor \frac{n}{2} \rfloor} \cdot 2^n}{(n-2)!!}; \quad
V_n     = \frac{\pi^{n/2}}{\Gamma\bigl(\frac{n}{2} + 1\bigr)} = \frac{(\frac{\pi}{2})^{\lfloor \frac{n}{2} \rfloor} \cdot 2^n}{n!!}
}$$

or equivalently in terms of τ instead of π:

$$S_{n-1} = \frac{2 (\frac{\tau}{2})^{n/2}}{\Gamma\bigl(\frac{n}{2}\bigr)} = \frac{(\frac{\tau}{4})^{\lfloor \frac{n}{2} \rfloor} \cdot 2^n}{(n-2)!!}; \quad
V_n     = \frac{(\frac{\tau}{2})^{n/2}}{\Gamma\bigl(\frac{n}{2} + 1\bigr)} = \frac{(\frac{\tau}{4})^{\lfloor \frac{n}{2} \rfloor} \cdot 2^n}{n!!}$$

where $\Gamma$ is the Euler gamma function and $!!$ denotes the double factorial.

Moreover, there exist the following recurrence relations between successive values of $V_n$ and $S_n$:

$V_n = \frac{S_{n-1}}{n}; \quad S_n = \tau V_{n-1}$

For the first values of the dimension n, the values of the generalized volume $V_n$ and surface area $S_{n-1}$ of a unit hypersphere are as follows, here expressed in terms of τ instead of π:

Dimension n	Hyper-volume V_{n} of a unit ball	Hyper-surface area S_{n-1} of a unit ball
1	$2$	$2$
2	$\frac{\tau}{2}$	$\tau$
3	$\frac{2\tau}{3}$	$2\tau$
4	$\frac{\tau^2}{8}$	$\frac{\tau^2}{2}$
5	$\frac{2\tau^2}{15}$	$\frac{2\tau^2}{3}$
6	$\frac{\tau^3}{48}$	$\frac{\tau^3}{8}$
7	$\frac{2\tau^3}{105}$	$\frac{2\tau^3}{15}$
8	$\frac{\tau^4}{384}$	$\frac{\tau^4}{48}$
9	$\frac{2\tau^4}{945}$	$\frac{2\tau^4}{105}$
10	$\frac{\tau^5}{3840}$	$\frac{\tau^5}{384}$
n	V_{n}	S_{n-1}

Only when the dimension n is 2 does τ have a privileged status as the circumference of the unit circle (the unit circle being a 2-dimensional ball, and circumference corresponding to generalized 1-dimensional volume). In higher dimensions, the particular choice of the constant τ instead of π becomes less advantageous. However, Hartl argues that circles and angles in the two-dimensional case are far more frequently encountered than higher-dimensional cases, and that it thus makes sense for the choice of the named constant τ to correspond to circumference in the two-dimensional case.

=== Comparison of formulas ===
The following table shows how various formulas appear when τ = 2π is used instead of π. For a more complete list, see List of formulae involving π.

Formula	Using π	Using τ	Notes
Angle subtended by 1/4 of a circle	${\color{orangered}\frac{\pi}{2}} \text{ rad}$	${\color{orangered}\frac{\tau}{4}} \text{ rad}$	τ/4 rad = 1/4 turn
Circumference of a circle	$C = {\color{orangered}2 \pi} r$	$C = {\color{orangered}\tau} r$	The length of a circular arc of angle θ is L = θr. A full turn corresponds to the angle τ.
Area of a circle	$A = {\color{orangered}\pi}r^2$	$A = {\color{orangered}\frac{1}{2} \tau} r^2$	The area of a circular sector of angle θ is A = 1/2θr^{2}.
Surface area of a sphere	$A = {\color{orangered}4 \pi}r^2$	$A = {\color{orangered}2 \tau} r^2$	The area of a spherical surface spanned by the solid angle θ is A = θr^{2}. A full sphere corresponds to the solid angle 2τ.
Volume of a 3D ball	$V = {\color{orangered}\frac{4}{3} \pi}r^3$	$V = {\color{orangered}\frac{2}{3} \tau} r^3$	The volume of a spherical sector spanned by the solid angle θ is V = 1/3θr^{3}.
Periodicity of trigonometric and exponential functions	$\sin(x+{\color{orangered} 2 \pi})=\sin(x)$ $\cos(x+{\color{orangered} 2 \pi})=\cos(x)$ $\tan(x+{\color{orangered} \pi})=\tan(x)$ $\exp(i(x+{\color{orangered} 2 \pi}))=\exp(ix)$	$\sin(x+{\color{orangered} \tau})=\sin(x)$ $\cos(x+{\color{orangered} \tau})=\cos(x)$ $\tan(x+{\color{orangered} \frac{\tau}{2}})=\tan(x)$ $\exp(i(x+{\color{orangered} \tau}))=\exp(ix)$	Valid for all $x \in \mathbb{C}$ except in the $\tan$ case, in which case $x$ mustn't be in the set $\{\frac{\tau}{4}+k \frac{\tau}{2} : k \in \mathbb{Z}\}$
Trigonometric formulas for supplementary angles	$\sin({\color{orangered} \pi}+x)=-\sin(x) \quad \sin({\color{orangered} \pi}-x)=\sin(x)$ $\cos({\color{orangered} \pi}+x)=-\cos(x) \quad \cos({\color{orangered} \pi}-x)=-\cos(x)$ $\tan({\color{orangered} \pi}+x)=\tan(x) \quad \tan({\color{orangered} \pi}-x)=-\tan(x)$	$\sin({\color{orangered} \frac{\tau}{2}}+x)=-\sin(x) \quad \sin({\color{orangered} \frac{\tau}{2}}-x)=\sin(x)$ $\cos({\color{orangered} \frac{\tau}{2}}+x)=-\cos(x) \quad \cos({\color{orangered} \frac{\tau}{2}}-x)=-\cos(x)$ $\tan({\color{orangered} \frac{\tau}{2}}+x)=\tan(x) \quad \tan({\color{orangered} \frac{\tau}{2}}-x)=-\tan(x)$	Valid for all $x \in \mathbb{C}$ except in the $\tan$ case, in which case $x$ mustn't be in the set $\{\frac{\tau}{4}+k \frac{\tau}{2} : k \in \mathbb{Z}\}$
Trigonometric formulas for complementary angles	$\sin({\color{orangered} \frac{\pi}{2}}+x)=\cos(x) \quad \sin({\color{orangered} \frac{\pi}{2}}-x)=\cos(x)$ $\cos({\color{orangered} \frac{\pi}{2}}+x)=-\sin(x) \quad \cos({\color{orangered} \frac{\pi}{2}}-x)=\sin(x)$ $\tan({\color{orangered} \frac{\pi}{2}}+x)=\frac{-1}{\tan(x)} \quad \tan({\color{orangered} \frac{\pi}{2}}-x)=\frac{1}{\tan(x)}$	$\sin({\color{orangered} \frac{\tau}{4}}+x)=\cos(x) \quad \sin({\color{orangered} \frac{\tau}{4}}-x)=\cos(x)$ $\cos({\color{orangered} \frac{\tau}{4}}+x)=-\sin(x) \quad \cos({\color{orangered} \frac{\tau}{4}}-x)=\sin(x)$ $\tan({\color{orangered} \frac{\tau}{4}}+x)=\frac{-1}{\tan(x)} \quad \tan({\color{orangered} \frac{\tau}{4}}-x)=\frac{1}{\tan(x)}$	Valid for all $x \in \mathbb{C}$ except in the $\tan$ case, in which case $x$ mustn't be a multiple of $\frac{\tau}{4}=\frac{\pi}{2}$
Area of a regular convex n-gon with circumradius 1	$A = \frac{n}{2} \sin \frac{{\color{orangered}2 \pi}}{n}$	$A = \frac{n}{2} \sin \frac{{\color{orangered}\tau}}{n}$	
Area of a regular convex n-gon with side length 1	$A=\frac{n}{4\tan{\frac{{\color{orangered} \pi}}{n}}}$	$A=\frac{n}{4\tan{\frac{{\color{orangered} \tau}}{2n}}}$	
Internal angle sum $\theta$ in an n-gon	$\theta={\color{orangered}\pi} \cdot (n-2)$	$\theta={\color{orangered}\tau} \cdot (\frac{n}{2}-1)$	
Solid angle $\Omega$ spanned by a cone of apex half-angle $\theta$	$\Omega={\color{orangered}2 \pi} \cdot (1-\cos \theta)$	$\Omega={\color{orangered}\tau} \cdot (1-\cos \theta)$	
n-ball and n-sphere volume and surface recurrence relation	$V_n(r) = \frac{r}{n} S_{n-1}(r)$ $S_n(r) = {\color{orangered} 2 \pi} r V_{n-1}(r)$	$V_n(r) = \frac{r}{n} S_{n-1}(r)$ $S_n(r) = {\color{orangered}\tau}rV_{n-1}(r)$	$V_n(r)$ and $S_{n-1}$ are (respectively) the hyper-volume and the hyper-surface area of an Euclidean $n$-dimensional hypersphere; V_{0}(r) = 1 S_{0}(r) = 2
Fourier transform $\mathcal{F}$ in the ordinary-frequency convention	$\mathcal{F}(f)(\xi) = \int_{-\infty}^{\infty} f(x)\ \exp(-i {\color{orangered}2\pi} \xi x)\,dx$	$\mathcal{F}(f)(\xi) = \int_{-\infty}^{\infty} f(x)\ \exp(-i {\color{orangered}\tau} \xi x)\,dx$	The Fourier transform $\mathcal{F}(f)$ exists and is defined for any real number $\xi$, as long as $f$ is integrable over $\mathbb{R}$. Here, $\xi$ can be interpreted as an ordinary (non-angular) frequency.
Cauchy's integral formula	$f(a) = \frac{1}{{\color{orangered}2\pi} i} \oint_\gamma \frac{f(z)}{z-a}\, dz$	$f(a) = \frac{1}{{\color{orangered}\tau} i} \oint_\gamma \frac{f(z)}{z-a}\, dz$	γ is the boundary of a disk containing a in the complex plane.
Standard normal distribution	$\varphi(x) = \frac{1}{\sqrt{{\color{orangered}2\pi}}}e^{-\frac{x^2}{2}}$	$\varphi(x) = \frac{1}{\sqrt{{\color{orangered}\tau}}}e^{-\frac{x^2}{2}}$	Here, $\varphi$ is the probability density function of a normal distribution of mean 0 and variance 1.
Stirling's approximation	$n! \sim_{n \to +\infty} \sqrt{{\color{orangered}2 \pi} n}\left(\frac{n}{e}\right)^n$	$n! \sim_{n \to +\infty} \sqrt{{\color{orangered}\tau} n}\left(\frac{n}{e}\right)^n$	
nth roots of unity	$e^{{\color{orangered}2 \pi} i \frac{k}{n}} = \cos\frac{{\color{orangered}2} k {\color{orangered}\pi}}{n} + i \sin\frac{{\color{orangered}2} k {\color{orangered}\pi}}{n}$	$e^{{\color{orangered}\tau} i \frac{k}{n}} = \cos\frac{k {\color{orangered}\tau}}{n} + i \sin\frac{k {\color{orangered}\tau}}{n}$	
Planck constant	$h = {\color{orangered}2 \pi} \hbar$	$h = {\color{orangered}\tau} \hbar$	ħ is the reduced Planck constant.
Angular frequency of a sinusoidal wave as a function of time	$\omega = {\color{orangered}2 \pi} f = \frac{{\color{orangered}2 \pi}}{T}$	$\omega = {\color{orangered}\tau} f = \frac{\color{orangered}\tau}{T}$	ω is the angular frequency; f is the ordinary frequency; T is the period.
Angular wavenumber of a sinusoidal wave as a function of space	$\operatorname{k} = {\color{orangered}2 \pi} \tilde{\nu} = \frac{{\color{orangered}2 \pi}}{\lambda}$	$\operatorname{k} = {\color{orangered}\tau} \tilde{\nu} = \frac{{\color{orangered}\tau}}{\lambda}$	k is the angular wavenumber (and the norm of the wave vector); $\tilde{\nu}$ is the ordinary wavenumber; λ is the wavelength (i.e. the spatial period).
Riemann's functional equation	$$\zeta(s) = {\color{orangered}2^s \pi^{s-1}}\ \sin\left( s{\color{orangered}\frac{\pi}{2}} \right)\ \Gamma(1-s)\ \zeta(1-s)$$	$$\zeta(s) = {\color{orangered}2\tau^{s-1}}\ \sin\left( s{\color{orangered}\frac{\tau}{4}} \right)\ \Gamma(1-s)\ \zeta(1-s)$$	$2^s (\frac{\tau}{2})^{s-1}$ reduces to $2 \tau^{s-1}$

== In culture ==
τ has made numerous appearances in culture. It is celebrated annually on June 28, known as Tau Day. Supporters of τ are called tauists. τ has been covered in videos by Vi Hart, Numberphile, SciShow, Steve Mould, Khan Academy, and 3Blue1Brown, and it has appeared in the comics xkcd, Saturday Morning Breakfast Cereal, and Sally Forth. The Massachusetts Institute of Technology usually announces admissions on March 14 at 6:28 p.m., which is on Pi Day at Tau Time. Peter Harremoës has used τ in a mathematical research article which was granted the journal Kybernetika's Editor's Award for the year 2016.

== In programming languages and calculators ==
The following table documents various programming languages that have implemented the circle constant for converting between turns and radians. All of the languages below support the name "Tau" in some casing, but Processing also supports "TWO_PI" and Raku also supports the symbol "τ" for accessing the same value.

Support for the circle constant in various programming languages
Language	Identifiers	First Version	Year Released
C# / .NET	System.Math.Tau and System.MathF.Tau	5.0	2020
Crystal	TAU	0.36.0	2021
Eiffel	math_constants.Tau	Curtiss	Not yet released
Erlang	math:tau/0	OTP 26.0	2023
GDScript	TAU	Godot 3.0	2018
Java	Math.TAU	19	2022
Nim	TAU	0.14.0	2016
Processing	TAU and TWO_PI	2.0	2013
Python	math.tau	3.6	2016
Raku	tau and τ		
Rust	core::f64::consts::TAU	1.47.0	2020
Zig	std.math.tau	0.6.0	2019

The constant τ is made available in the Google calculator, Desmos graphing calculator, and the iPhone's Convert Angle option expresses the turn as τ.

== See also ==
- Turn (angle) represents τ radians
- π represents τ/2
