= Jim Sorensen =

Jim Sorensen (born May 10, 1967) is an American track and field athlete, known primarily for running middle distance races. He is the current Masters M40 world record holder at 800 metres and former Masters M40 world record holder at 1500 metres.

Sorensen's race to stardom was rather slow. In high school he was moderately successful, finishing in 6th place in the 800 metres (1:52.38) at the 1986 CIF California State Meet while running for Villa Park High School. He then ran for Santa Ana College and Cal Poly, San Luis Obispo, eventually achieving a Division II NCAA Championship at 1500 metres in 1991. He became the 190th American to join the 4 minute mile club in a race in San Francisco in 1993. His time was 3:59.70. He qualified for and competed at the US Track and Field Championships from 1993 to 1997. By 1996 he was the No. 4 ranked 1500 metre runner in the United States. His lifetime personal records (PR's) for 800 metres, 1500 metres, one mile, 3000 metres, and 5000 metres are 1:47.24, 3:38.65, 3:59.16, 8:09.00, and 14:10.17, respectively.

== Olympic pursuit ==
He ran in the 1996 U.S. Olympic Trials, finishing a "surprising" second place by .02 seconds in a tight "kicker's" race. After finishing the race in Atlanta, Georgia's heat and humidity, Sorensen was carted away from the finish line. To add insult to his injury, because he did not achieve the "A" standard, Sorensen did not get to run in the Olympics, his berth being given to Brian Hyde, though his 22-day pursuit of the qualifying time netted him his lifetime personal record of 3:38.65, .65 slower than the qualifying standard.

== Masters ==
Following his disappointment, Sorensen took it in stride and continued to run without the help of a sponsor. By the time he reached age 40 he still had the goal of running sub-4:00. Though he didn't achieve that (through 2007, only Eamon Coughlan ever has-indoors) he did set the M40 world record for 1500 metres at the Southern California Association USATF Championships at Occidental College in Eagle Rock, California on June 3, 2007 at 3:44.06. Four weeks later in Bloomington, Indiana at the American Milers Club meet at the University of Indiana he set the 800 metres world record at 1:50.34. He was named USATF's Athlete of the Week that week A week after that he ran in a Pro Men’s Mile exhibition at the USA Youth Championships in Lisle, Illinois. Although the conditions were hot and windy, his time was 4:04.98, an M40 American record. Finally as a masters runner, he has a sponsor-The Sports Basement, a discount sporting and camping goods store.

Sorensen's full-time employment is as a coach and physical education teacher at Bancroft Middle School (San Leandro, California). He also spent a few years as an assistant coach for the cross country team at Notre Dame de Namur University
