= Canyon High School (Anaheim, California) =

Coordinates: 33.848383°N 117.78849°W

Location
- 220 South Imperial Highway; Anaheim, California 92807-3999; United States

Information
- Type: Public
- Established: 1972
- School district: Orange Unified School District
- CEEB code: 052267
- Principal: Brent McKee
- Teaching staff: 84.87 (FTE)
- Grades: 9–12
- Enrollment: 2,183 (2024–2025)
- Student to teacher ratio: 25.72
- Campus size: 40 acres (160,000 m^{2})
- Colors: Black; Vegas gold
- Fight song: Canyon Fight Song
- Athletics: Cross Country
- Athletics conference: Division 2 Southern Section
- Sports: Cross Country
- Mascot: Cobra
- Nickname: The Cobras
- Rival: Villa Park High School
- Newspaper: The Comanche Insider
- Yearbook: The Legend
- Feeder schools: El Rancho Charter School
- Feeder to: Santiago Canyon College
- Website: www.canyonhighschool.org

Canyon High School is a traditional four-year high school located in the Anaheim Hills community in the city of Anaheim, California and is an International Baccalaureate school. It is located on 40 acres (160,000 m^{2}) of land on Imperial Highway between the cross streets of Santa Ana Canyon Road and Nohl Ranch Road, and serves students who reside in Anaheim Hills and a small portion of Yorba Linda north of La Palma Avenue and east of Yorba Linda Boulevard. The school, which opened its doors in 1973, has a student population of 2,400. The school primarily serves the community of Anaheim Hills as well as parts of East Anaheim and Orange, and was designated a California Distinguished School in 2007 by the California Department of Education. The school's fight song is Washington and Lee Swing. The school is currently ranked as one of the top 1,000 high schools in the United States by Newsweek at number 128, a distinction given to less than 1% of high schools nationally. It is the 204th highest ranked school in the state of California.

== History ==
The school started in 1974 as a shared campus with the established Villa Park High School for students in grades 10–12. Upon completion of the Anaheim Hills campus, a variety of names were considered for the site. A ballot of three proposed names was given to the students of Vista Del Rio Jr. High School to vote on. The students did not like any of the choices so a write-in campaign was started. Canyon High School was the name of choice due to its location and the fact that the local students call that area "The Canyon".

Ultimately, the name Canyon High School was selected. Boundary changes in the district and an increase in the population of the Anaheim Hills community resulted in changes at the school. The school was designated to serve students in grades 9 through 12 in 1987, and El Rancho Charter School was designated as the only feeder school within the boundaries of Canyon High School. The school implemented an International Baccalaureate Program in 1988.

== Education ==
Canyon High School offers a variety of programs for its students including the International Baccalaureate Program, Stellar Technology Program, and Specialized Science Program, in addition to numerous college-level Advanced Placement and Honors courses.

The school focuses on technology, having undergone thousands of dollars' worth of upgrading the schools technology, by adding 100 computers, and making 19 of its courses available as online classes. Canyon is also home to Orange County's only high school Aviation Academy which uses advanced simulators and encourages students to explore career options in the Aviation industry with an emphasis on becoming pilots. In 2019, the U.S. News & World Report ranked the school 387th in the state of California and 2,557th in the United States.

== Athletics ==
The school mascot is the Comanche. Students at Canyon High School compete in the following sports:

- Baseball
- Basketball
- Cheer
- Color Guard
- Cross Country
- Dance Team
- Football
- Lacrosse
- Golf
- Marching Band
- Roller Hockey
- Soccer
- Softball
- Song Team
- Swimming
- Tennis
- Track & Field
- Ultimate Frisbee
- Volleyball
- Water Polo
- Winter Drumline
- Wrestling

== Notable alumni ==
- David Buehler, National Football League kicker
- Eden Espinosa, singer/stage actress
- Andy Garfield, film score composer
- Christina Hall, real estate investor and Television personality.
- Penelope Hocking, Professional soccer player
- Seonna Hong, artist
- Courtney Mathewson, Olympic gold medalist water polo player
- Omar Benson Miller, actor
- Connie Needham, actress
- Brian Nestande, California State Assemblyman
- Andy Park, Illustrator
- Chris Snitko, Major League Soccer player
- Kwame Watson-Siriboe, Major League Soccer player

=== Professional baseball players ===
- Christian Colon, shortstop
- John Cummings, pitcher
- Rob Deer, All-Star right fielder
- Grant Green, second baseman
- Doug Linton, pitcher
- Troy Melton, pitcher
- Vinnie Pestano, pitcher
- Steve Scarsone, second baseman
- Eric Valent, first baseman
