= Heritage Park (Cerritos, California) =

Park in California

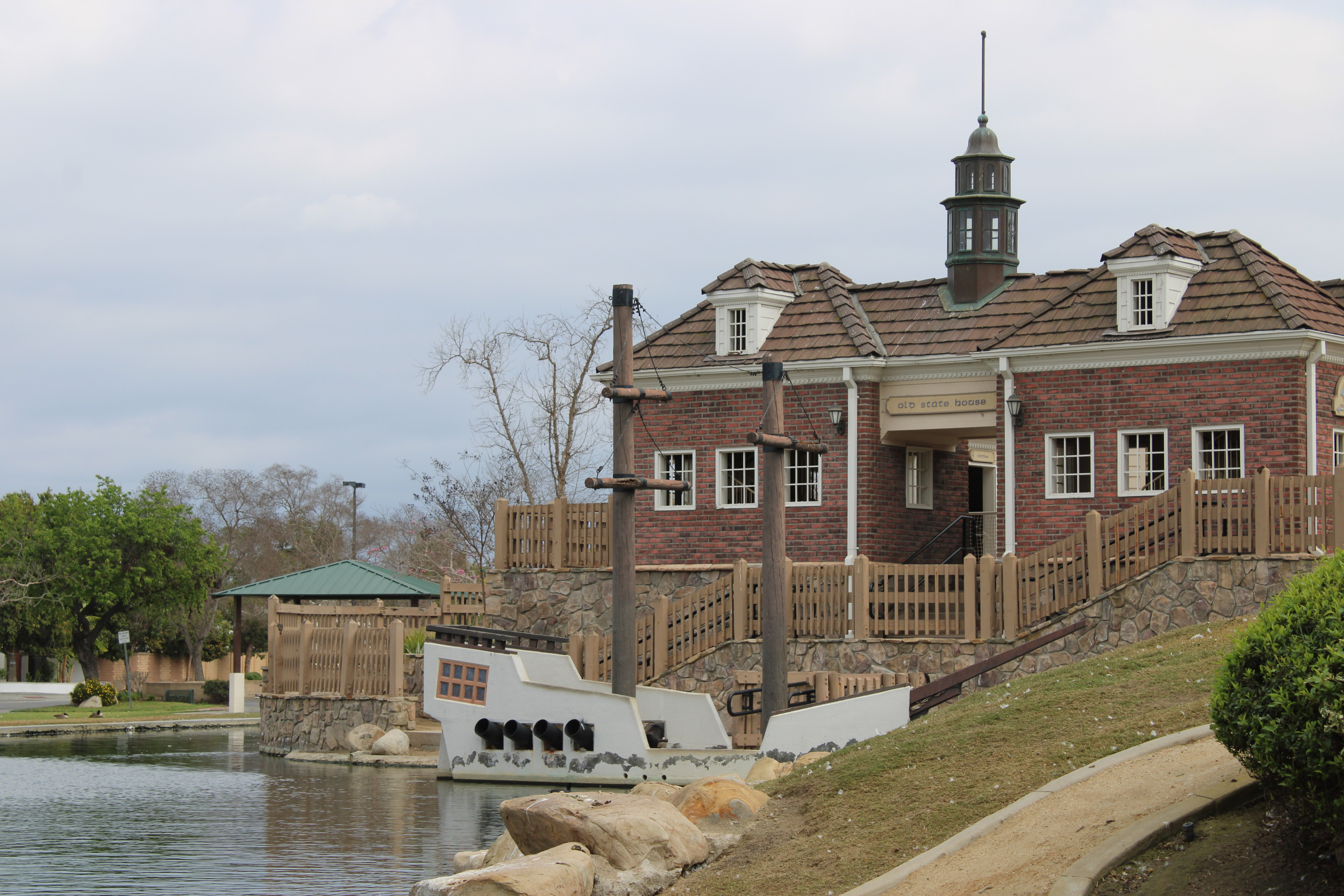
- The park in 2025

- Location within the Los Angeles metropolitan area Location within California Location within the United States
- Type: Urban
- Location: Cerritos, California
- Coordinates: 33.8643°N 118.0619°W
- Area: 15 acres (6.1 ha)
- Owner: City of Cerritos
- Open: 10AM-8PM

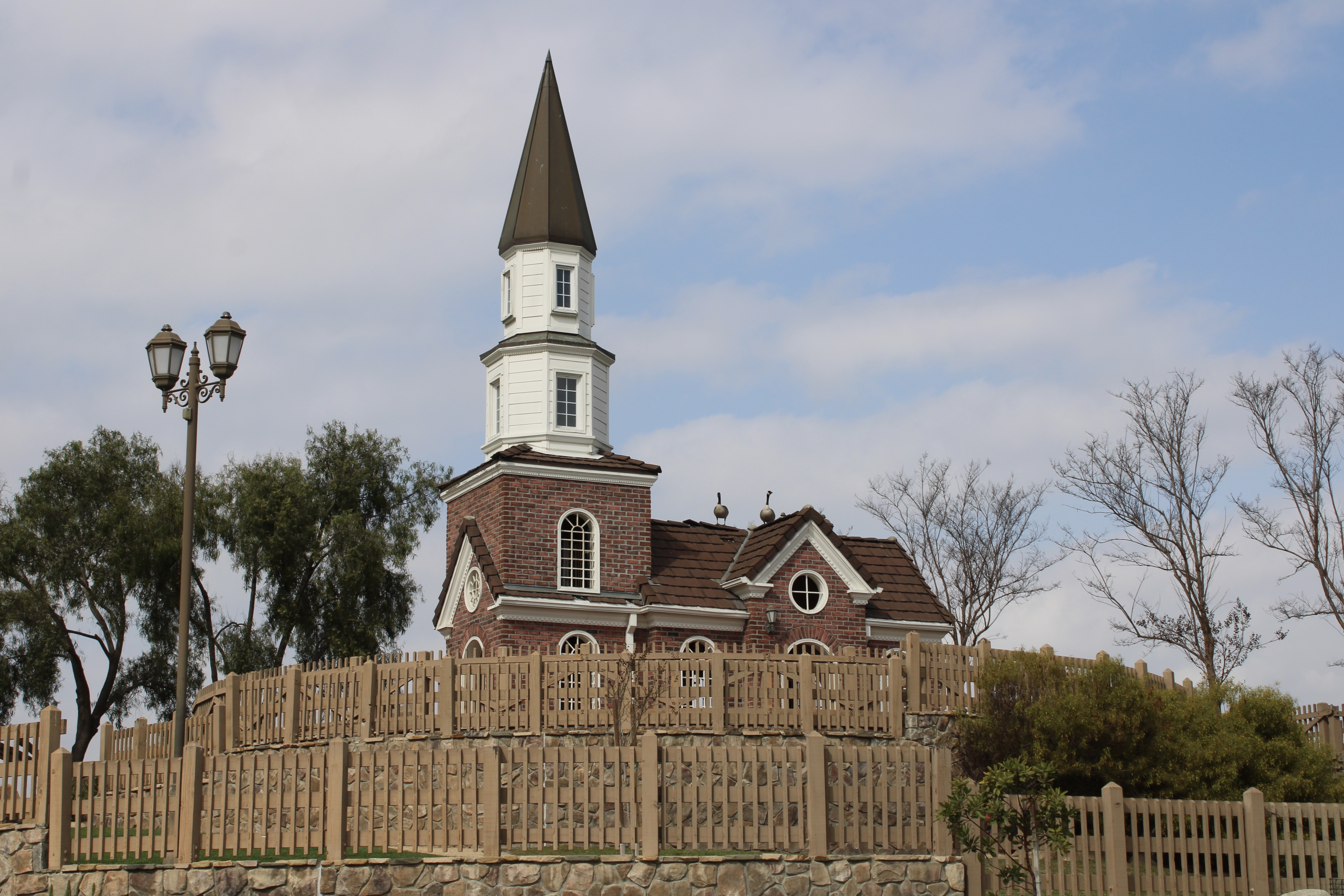
The replica of the Old North Church in the park

Heritage Park is an urban park in Cerritos, California. It measures 15 acres (6.1 ha) in area. It is close to the center of the city, with Cerritos High School, Cerritos Library, and Cerritos Towne Center all located nearby.

== History ==
In October 1988, then-presidential candidate George H. W. Bush held a rally at the park to gain support for the 1988 United States presidential election as a part of his campaign. The park was refurbished in 2002, to meet new standards set in place for the safety of playgrounds. A new, more modern playground opened in June 2014. It is located outside of the play island. The park's community center was closed in response to the COVID-19 pandemic, and reopened about a year later.

== Facilities ==
The main attraction of the park is the play island in the center, which is open from 10AM to dusk every day but Tuesday, when it opens at 2PM instead. The island was planned to have the appearance of a Bostonian village in the 1770s, containing themed buildings with play equipment located inside them. A pirate ship and a replica of the Old North Church (which houses a tall tube slide) can also be found. A moat, surrounding the island, is home to ducks, geese, and turtles. The island is made accessible by two covered bridges in the parks front and back.

The park also contains a community center with a kitchen, picnic areas, two playgrounds, restrooms, two basketball courts, and a softball diamond. There is also a statue of Paul Revere at the park's entrance and various signs detailing his Midnight Ride are planted throughout the park.

== Events ==
Starting in 2022, the city holds an annual Mid-Autumn Festival in September at the park. Participants release lanterns in the park's moat.
