= Cerritos Towne Center =

Retail park in Cerritos, California, U.S.

Coordinates: 33.871904°N 118.059822°W

The Cerritos Towne Center is a retail park located in the center of Cerritos, California that combines retailing, office, and entertainment in one master project. The Cerritos Center for the Performing Arts is located within the southwestern part of the project. Cerritos High School, Cerritos City Hall, the Cerritos Sheriff Station, and the Cerritos Millennium Library are all located across the street from the Towne Center development and are sometimes collectively referred to as "Downtown Cerritos."

== Development and history ==
=== The Golden Triangle ===
Built on 125 acres (0.51 km^{2}) of former dairy farms, the future site of the Cerritos Towne Center was one of the last remnants of the city of Cerritos' agricultural past. The area, formally known as "Area Development Plan 2", bounded by State Route 91 to the north, Shoemaker Avenue to the east, 183rd Street to the south and Bloomfield Avenue to the west, was nicknamed "the Golden Triangle" by the local press because of its large revenue potential.

By the time the dairies moved out and the area was ready for redevelopment in the early 1980s, the Cerritos Redevelopment Agency discussed possible uses for the large plot. Housing, residential and recreational development were ruled out because the redevelopment agency decided that whatever be built in the area ought to generate tax revenue. Since 1970, a proposal floated around for a unique donut-shaped shopping center, but the idea was eventually turned down due to its closeness to the already successful Los Cerritos Center. The following year in 1971, discussions were held to feature a Polynesian cultural center complete with an artificial ocean with six islands and a volcano that would erupt nightly. Neighbors with NIMBY mindsets and concern with pollution (although the developer promised the pollution would be controlled) was enough to reject the development.

Market research conducted by the city concluded that a mixed-use of public facilities, hotels, office and commercial buildings would be the most ideal usage of the Golden Triangle space.

=== Southern division ===
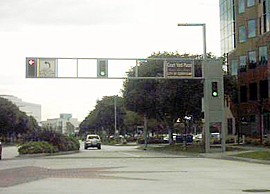
A themed traffic light with the office buildings of the Cerritos Towne Center in the surrounding background.

The city of Cerritos immediately contracted the Transpacific Development Company to work on the multiphased southern project. Pressure from neighboring cities such as Norwalk and Downey that were building new hotels in their respective cities added to the competition. Capitalizing on its proximity to the Artesia Freeway, the redevelopment agency spent $8.6 million on road improvements, adding on-ramps and off-ramps to the Towne Center, and landscaping.

Projected figures used by city leaders calculated that over its first 50 years, the $225 million Cerritos Towne Center would generate $585 million in tax revenue and 4,500 jobs. Indeed, the national accounts division of ADP moved its regional headquarters into the Cerritos Towne Center and were the first occupants of the office sector. In 1990, Phase I of the Towne Center project welcomed the 8-story Sheraton Cerritos Hotel, which remains the only transient occupancy building in the city. In January 1993, the Cerritos Center for the Performing Arts opened its doors to the public and remains one of the most acclaimed venues for its size.

=== Northern division ===
Retail and restaurants were reserved for the northern quadrants. The city of Cerritos hired the Vestar Development Company of Scottsdale, Arizona to develop the 41-acre (170,000 m^{2}) commercial sector along the lines of Newport Beach's Fashion Island. However, further market research revealed that the upscale retail market was in a slump and would compete negatively with the Los Cerritos Center across town. City leaders decided that a more midscale big-box center would succeed and complement shopping in Cerritos. To much fanfare, Smith's Food King and one of the first Walmart stores in the Los Angeles area ushered in the commercial phase of the Towne Center project on August 26, 1994. Today, the Cerritos Towne Center brings in a gross retail sales total in excess of $200 million a year.

== See also ==
- Cerritos, California
- Cerritos Auto Square
- Cerritos Center for the Performing Arts
- Cerritos High School
- Cerritos Millennium Library
- Pat Nixon Park
- Cerritos Veterans Memorial
- Los Cerritos Center
