= Pat Nixon Park =

Childhood home of Pat Nixon

- A statue of the late former First Lady Pat Nixon, for whom Pat Nixon Park is named, with senior center in background
- Interactive map of Pat Nixon Park
- Type: Neighborhood park
- Location: Cerritos, California, USA
- Coordinates: 33.85834°N 118.06802°W
- Area: 4 acres (1.6 ha)
- Created: 1967
- Status: open

Pat Nixon Park is a neighborhood park in Cerritos, California, named for the late First Lady Pat Nixon (1912-1993). The 4-acre (1.6 ha) park occupies the site of the former First Lady's childhood home and truck farm, where she lived from 1914 until 1931, a Senior Center that now sits on the site of the home after it was destroyed by a fire in 1978, and the Patricia Nixon Elementary School.

== Senior Center ==
The Cerritos Senior Center at Pat Nixon Park is a 27,500-square-foot (2,550 m^{2}) public recreational clubhouse in Cerritos, California targeted towards the 50-and-over demographic. It was originally dedicated on January 29, 1994. The $3.5 million senior center is located within the park.

=== Development and architecture ===
The aging of the baby boomers in Cerritos and elsewhere prompted efforts to plan and develop a clubhouse type center that would focus on services to the rapidly growing senior population. Some qualities sought for the project included a place for senior citizens to socialize, participate in educational programs, receive human services, and enjoy recreational activities. The center needed to provide a focal point for community involvement.

Cerritos leaders agreed to place the senior center in a relatively central location. Not only did Pat Nixon Park make the center more accessible for drivers, but the location also ensured that routes from the Cerritos On Wheels transit system to additional points of interest such as the Cerritos Center for the Performing Arts, Los Cerritos Center, the Cerritos Towne Center and the Cerritos Millennium Library would not require a significant commute for seniors who could not drive.

Wolff, Lang, Christopher Architects Inc. was chosen to design a building different from the city of Cerritos' ultramodern style tendencies. The developers decided upon an inviting, homey American Craftsman style structure with rustic river rock and wood framework and trellises.

The interior of the senior center offers two lounges and ample space for classes and activities, crafts, computer usage and matinées. A large tank with exotic fish and a World Hall for special exhibits are also included. Multipurpose rooms provide stages and kitchens for celebrations and programs. Outside, a park surrounding the center with patio and barbecue areas, koi fishponds and lawns completes the landscape.

In March 2006, as part of Cerritos' golden anniversary, a 5,000-square-foot (460 m^{2}) wellness and fitness room was added and dedicated in order to help local seniors stay healthy and remain active.

== Statue of Pat Nixon ==
The Cerritos City Council approved in April 1996 erecting the "life-size, full-body" bronze statue of Pat Nixon and selected Ivan Schwartz, who had sculpted statues of ten world leaders for the Richard Nixon Presidential Library and Museum in Yorba Linda, as the statue's sculptor. The dedication of the statue was March 1, 1997, and occurred at its current location, the rose garden of the senior center.

== Pat Nixon's childhood home ==
The home Nixon lived in from 1914 to 1931 was situated on the corner of South Street and Ely Avenue. The city of Cerritos bought the property from Mrs. Nixon's brother in 1967, but the home was destroyed by fire in 1978. The bricks used in the existing memorial are from the home's fireplace and chimney.

== See also ==
- Patricia Nixon Elementary School
