= Los Cerritos Center =

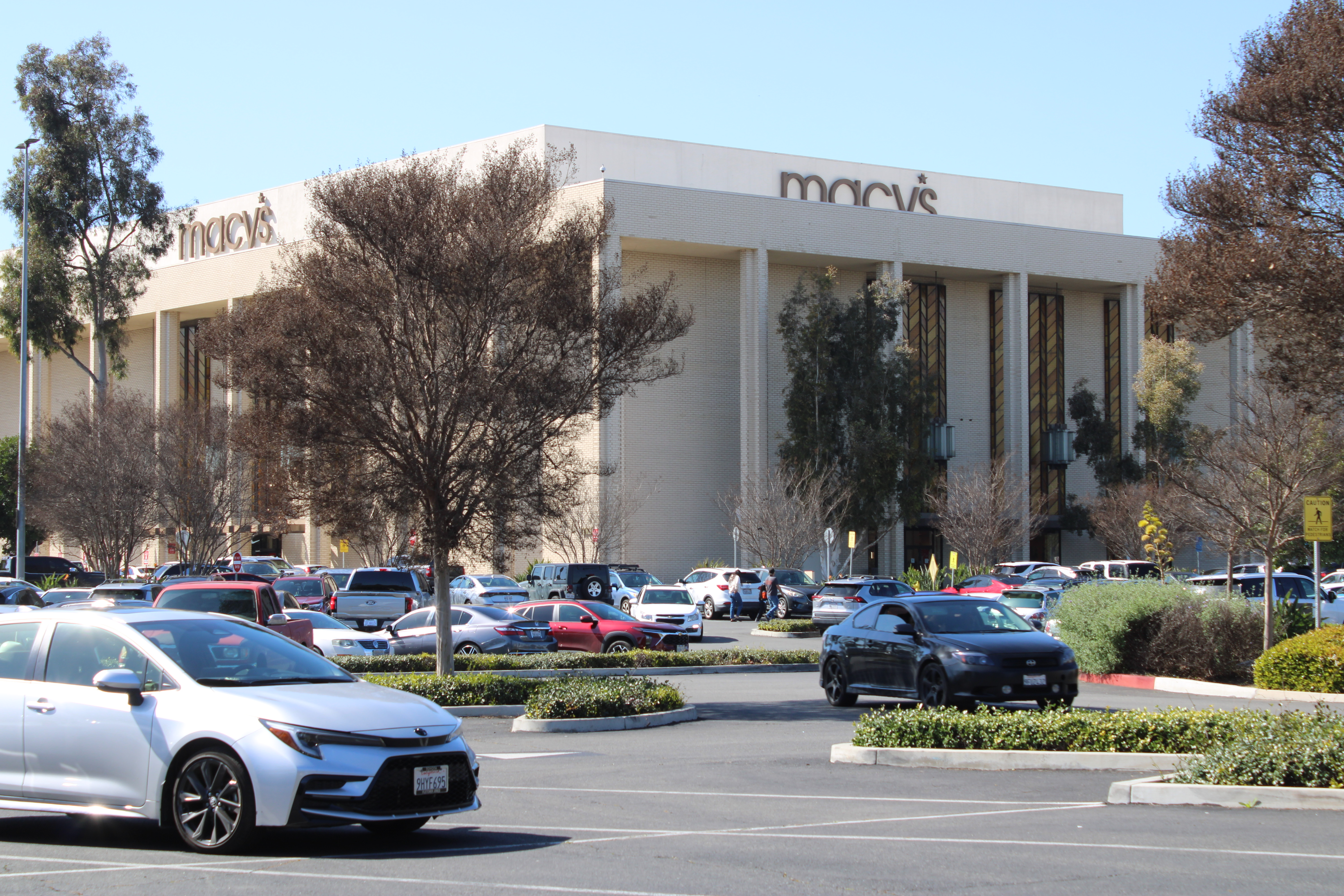
- Macy's at the mall in 2025
- Location: Cerritos, California, United States
- Coordinates: 33.8622°N 118.0943°W
- Opened: September 1971
- Developer: The Hahn Company and Homart Development Co.
- Manager: Macerich
- Owner: Macerich
- Num. of stores: 184 (as of 2026)
- Num. of anchor tenants: 4 (Macy's, Nordstrom, Dick's Sporting Goods, Harkins Theatres)
- Floor area: 1,367,000 sq ft (127,000 m^{2})(GLA)
- Floors: 1
- Website: www.shoploscerritos.com

The Los Cerritos Center is a super regional shopping mall located in Cerritos, California. Since September 1971, the Los Cerritos Center has been an integral part of the city of Cerritos' tax revenue. The mall is the city's largest revenue source, producing $581 per square foot in sales ($296 million total) in 2010. The tax revenue generated from the Los Cerritos Center for its host city totals to approximately $3 million a year. The facility is owned by Macerich & GIC Private Limited.

== History ==
The Cerritos Redevelopment Agency initially invested $30 million for the development of the Los Cerritos Center area. The 100-acre (0.40 km^{2}) shopping area built at Gridley Road and South Street was developed by Ernest M. Hahn, Inc. in September 1971 with the Phase I opening of the corridor from The Broadway department store (currently Macy's) to Ohrbach's (first became Mervyn's in 1987, then a Forever 21 until its closing in 2025, and J.W. Robinson's (became Robinsons-May in 1993) in addition to having an initial 150 specialty stores. Phase II followed in 1971 with the opening of the wing from Ohrbach's to Sears. In 1981, Phase III saw the opening of Nordstrom and its first wing. In November 1993, Phase IV was completed when the Palm Court Cafes debuted in the center with 14 eateries.

At its opening, the Los Cerritos Center was one of the area's first shopping malls and was noted for its high quality maintenance and complete climate-controlled environment. The original goal of the center was to bring thousands of dollars of sales tax revenue to the city of Cerritos. In its first four years, the city of Cerritos' retail sales grew tenfold, topping over $207 million in 1974.

In 2015, Sears Holdings spun off its 235 properties, including the Sears at Los Cerritos Center, into Sertiage Growth Properties.

Since the end of 2015, the center has been undergoing a large-scale renovation, which brought in new anchors such as Dick's Sporting Goods and Harkins Theatres, in-line stores, remodeled interiors, new furnishings and lighting, exterior landscaping, as well as art work and overall re-branding.

The Macy's wing houses merchandise, confectionery, and services for the family, the main concourse holds more upscale fashion stores, restaurants and boutiques, and the Sears wing focuses on specialty shops in entertainment, younger consumers, as well as the newly renovated Dining Court.

Forever 21, which opened in January 2010 from the old Mervyn's store, was the first flagship styled store for the retailer in the United States and opened to much acclaim.

A brand new, relocated Nordstrom department store and wing opened in May 2010 on the site of the former Robinsons-May store (closed in 2006 due to Federated acquiring May Department Stores Company). The added wing made room for nine additional in-line shops and restaurants. The old Nordstrom site was demolished for redevelopment and is now the site of a 16-screen Harkins Theatres which opened on May 5, 2016, as well as The Cheesecake Factory, which opened on November 3, 2015.

Realizing the importance of multiculturalism and diversity in the region today, the Los Cerritos Center, in conjunction with the city of Cerritos, is home to the Festival of Friendship held every February. Cultural booths and performances are held annually with the goal of reaching out to the various diverse communities the center serves.

In 2010, 8.5 million shoppers visited the mall with November 26 (Black Friday) marking the biggest day of the year with 79,682 visitors. The daily average attendance from January through November 2010 was 22,133 people a day. December 2010 saw an average of 35,631 a day. Los Cerritos Center is the most financially successful mall in the Southeast Los Angeles region.

In early 2017, Red Robin closed to make way for a P. F. Chang's, which was opened in late 2017.

On October 15, 2018, it was announced that Sears would be closing as part of a plan to close 142 stores nationwide. The store closed on December 6, 2018.

In March of 2025, it was announced that Forever 21 would close at part of a 12 store closure in Southern California, which included their headquarters in Los Angeles. The store closed sometime in April of 2025.

In 2026, Dick’s Sporting Goods announced that they would open one of their large format Dick’s House of Sport concept stores on the site of the Sears anchor store. The company expects the location to open sometime in late 2027. The Sears anchor store was demolished in June 2026.

== Palm Court Cafes ==
The Palm Court Cafes was a food court with restaurants such as McDonald’s, Steak Escape, Subway, and more. The Food Court had a lavish entrance, featuring yellow letters, a bunch of trees, and a cool design. Even the mall entrance was lavish. In 2015 however, the mall renovated it, turning it into the Dining Court and closing the McDonald’s.

== Former tenants ==
Previous tenants of the Los Cerritos Center include:

Tenant name	Date opened	Date closed	Replacement
UA Galaxy Movie Theater	May 20, 1998	February 13, 2014	Dick's Sporting Goods
McDonald’s	2000's?	2015	Kick’n Crab Express
Disney Store	-	2021	-
Barkworks	-	-	-
GameStop	-	-	-
Fiat	-	-	-
Sears	May 1972	December 6, 2018	Dick's House of Sport
Forever 21	January 2010	April 2025	-
Ohrbach's	March 24, 1972	December, 1986	Mervyn's
Mervyn's	April 1987	Jan 2009	Forever 21
The Broadway	1971	1996	Macy's
Woolworths	-	1997	-
United Artist Mall Cinema 1-2-3-4	September 15, 1971	-	UA Galaxy Movie Theater
United Artists Twin Cinemas A & B	March 22, 1972	-	UA Galaxy Movie Theater
J.W. Robinson's	1971	1993	Robinsons-May
Robinsons-May	1993	2006	Nordstrom
First Nordstrom	1981	2010	Harkins

== Transit access ==
The mall is accessible by Metro Local Line 62, Long Beach Transit Routes 141, 172, 173, 192, Norwalk Transit Route 2, and OCTA Routes 30 and 38.

The planned Pioneer station on Metro Rail's future Southeast Gateway Line will be within walking distance from the mall, located to the east on Pioneer Boulevard.

== See also ==
- Cerritos Auto Square
- Cerritos Center for the Performing Arts
- Cerritos Millennium Library
- Cerritos Senior Center at Pat Nixon Park
- Cerritos Towne Center
- Cerritos Veterans Memorial

== Sources ==
- Eftychiou, A., & Cenovich, M. (2006). Cerritos at 50: celebrating our past and our future. Virginia Beach, VA: The Donning Company Publishers.
