= Tracy High Continuation School =

Coordinates: 33.878585°N 118.071145°W

Location
- 12222 Cuesta Drive; Cerritos, California 90703; United States

Information
- School type: Secondary
- School board: ABC Unified School District
- Superintendent: Mary Sieu
- Principal: Jeff Green
- Staff: 15.40 (FTE)
- Grades: 9-12
- Enrollment: 239 (2018–19)
- Student to teacher ratio: 15.52
- Language: English
- Colors: Blue, Black, Gold
- Mascot: Saints
- Website: www.tracyhs.us

Tracy (Wilbur) High Continuation School is a public continuation school in Cerritos, California, serving grades 9-12. It is part of ABC Unified School District. The school has a teen parent program which gives teen parents the skill they need to raise a child.
