= James T. Russell =

James T. Russell may refer to:

- James Russell (inventor) (born 1931), American inventor
- James T. Russell (politician) (1927–2006), member of the Florida House of Representatives
- James T. Russell (artist), creator of the Cerritos Veterans Memorial, Cerritos, California, US
