= Nancy Wang Yuen =

American sociologist

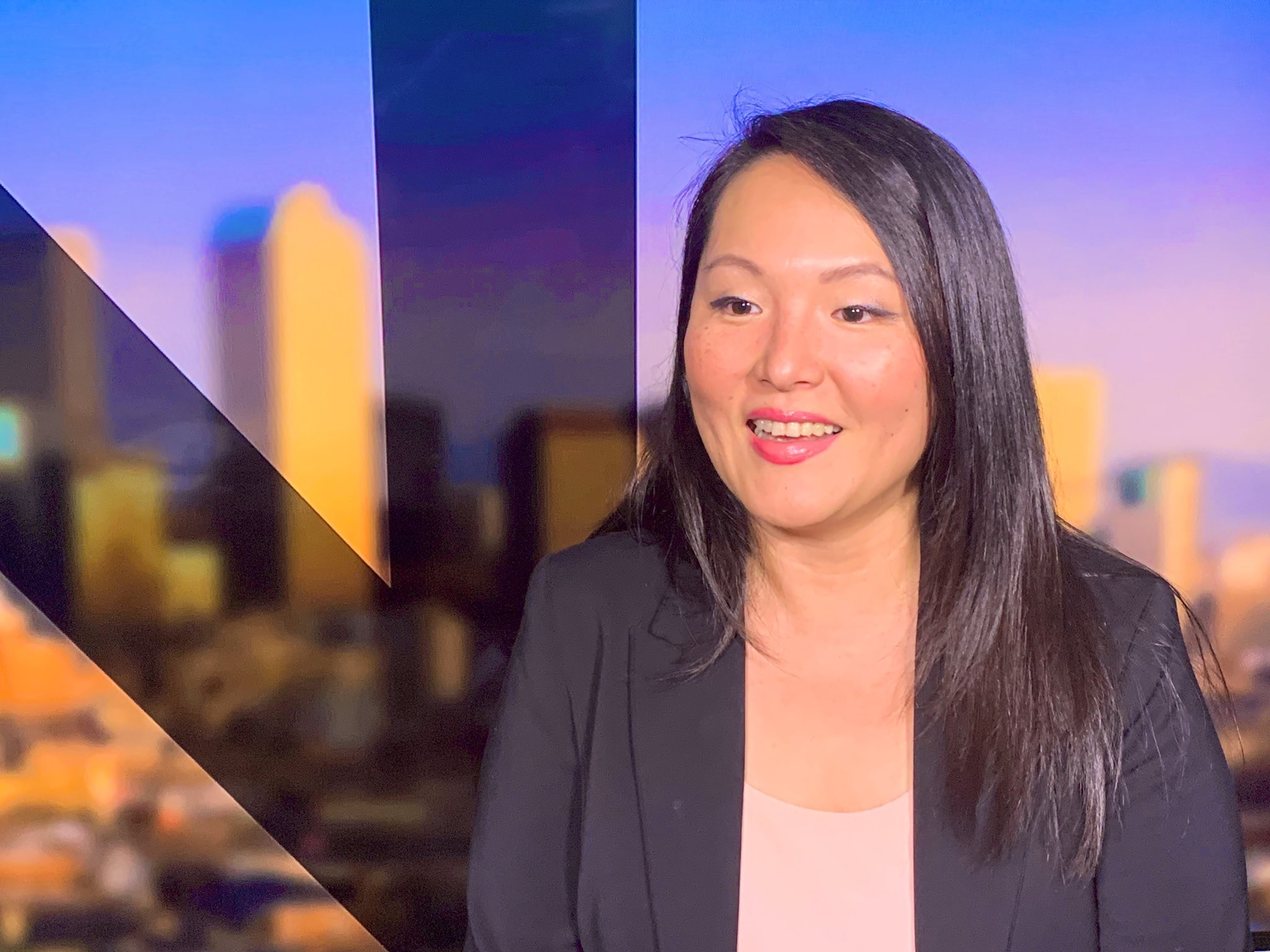
- Yuen, 2021
- Born: 1976 or 1977 (age 48–49); Taiwan
- Education: University of California, Los Angeles (BA, PhD)
- Scientific career
- Fields: Ethnic Studies
- Workplaces: Crafton Hills College

Chinese name
- Simplified Chinese: 王嵐芝
Transcriptions
Standard Mandarin
- Hanyu Pinyin: Wáng Lánzhī

Nancy Wang Yuen (Chinese: 王嵐芝) is a Taiwanese-American sociologist. A professor of ethnic studies at Crafton Hills College, Yuen specializes in race and ethnicity in film and television, particularly in Asian American representation and bias in Hollywood filmmaking.

== Early life ==
Yuen was born in Taiwan. At the age of 5, she immigrated to the U.S., and grew up in Long Beach, California with her father. Her mother was an undocumented immigrant who overstayed her student visa, and took classes in the U.S. to become a computer programmer.

== Education and positions ==
Yuen attended Bret Harte Elementary in Long Beach. After elementary school, she graduated from Whitney High School in Cerritos, California and went on to college in Texas, before transferring to Long Beach City College.

She attended the University of California, Los Angeles, where she completed a B.A. degree in English in 1997. In 2008, Yuen graduated from UCLA with a PhD in sociology.

In 2008, she became a professor in the Department of Sociology at Biola University. In 2016, she began a term as the chair of that department. In 2022, she left Biola University, citing conflicts with leadership, primarily in support with her work and commitment to the values of the school. Taking a break as an academic, she worked as a consultant at Peoplism up until 2024. She current holds a position as full-time faculty at Crafton Hills College, in their ethnic studies department.

== Research ==
Yuen's research focuses on race and ethnicity in film, television, and new media. In 2016, she published the book Reel inequality: Hollywood actors and racism, on the topic of racial inequality in the film industry, and the implications of the overwhelmingly white and male demographics of the most powerful people in that industry. The book is based on more than a hundred interviews with people involved in the film industry, particularly actors of color, conducted from 2005 to 2015. Yuen examines the mechanisms that produce notoriously limited opportunities for actors of color, and why those few opportunities so often require those actors to portray characters who are defined by racial stereotypes. Yuen identifies several ways that people at many stages of the film production process, from talent agents to casting directors to script writers, contribute to constraining the roles that are available to actors of color. Yuen uses the many interviews with actors that she conducted for Reel inequality to examine these processes from the perspective of actors of color, including the techniques that many of them have developed to make the most of such constrained opportunities, and the emotional cost of regularly performing stereotypes. Reel inequality was noted for addressing a particularly timely topic, since the year it was released, 2016, was the same year that the 88th Academy Awards featured only white nominees for its acting awards, prompting the #OscarsSoWhite controversy. The book was recommended by Michael Eric Dyson in an interview with The New York Times.

In 2017, Yuen was a co-author of the study Tokens on the small screen: Asian Americans and Pacific Islanders in prime time and streaming television.

== Media work ==
In addition to her academic research, Yuen has been a regular contributor to news outlets, has provided expert commentary and interviews for popular media, and has co-produced documentary films. In 2014, she co-produced Mass Confucian: Language Learning or Communist Propaganda? This 25-minute film premiered at the Los Angeles Asian Pacific Film Festival and the San Diego Asian Film Festival in 2014. She also co-produced Living in Silence: Toraichi Kono, a biographical documentary about Toraichi Kono, who was Charlie Chaplin's valet.

Yuen has been a frequent guest writer for HuffPost. She has also been regularly quoted on topics relating to inclusion in the film industry, and her work on the topic has been cited, in news media such as The New York Times, The Washington Post, Variety, and Time. Yuen was also interviewed in the PBS documentary Asian Americans, and she has been profiled in PRI's The World and Faithfully Magazine.

== Selected works ==
- Reel Inequality: Hollywood Actors and Racism. New Brunswick, NJ: Rutgers University Press, 2016. ISBN 9780813586311
