= Stowers Elementary School =

Stowers Elementary School may refer to:

- Stowers Elementary School - Cerritos, California (Los Angeles area) - ABC Unified School District
- Stowers Elementary School - Lithia, Florida (Tampa/St. Petersburg area) - Hillsborough County Public Schools
- Stowers Elementary School - Fort Moore (and Cusseta, Georgia) - Department of Defense Education Activity
