= Mark Pulido =

American politician (born 1968)

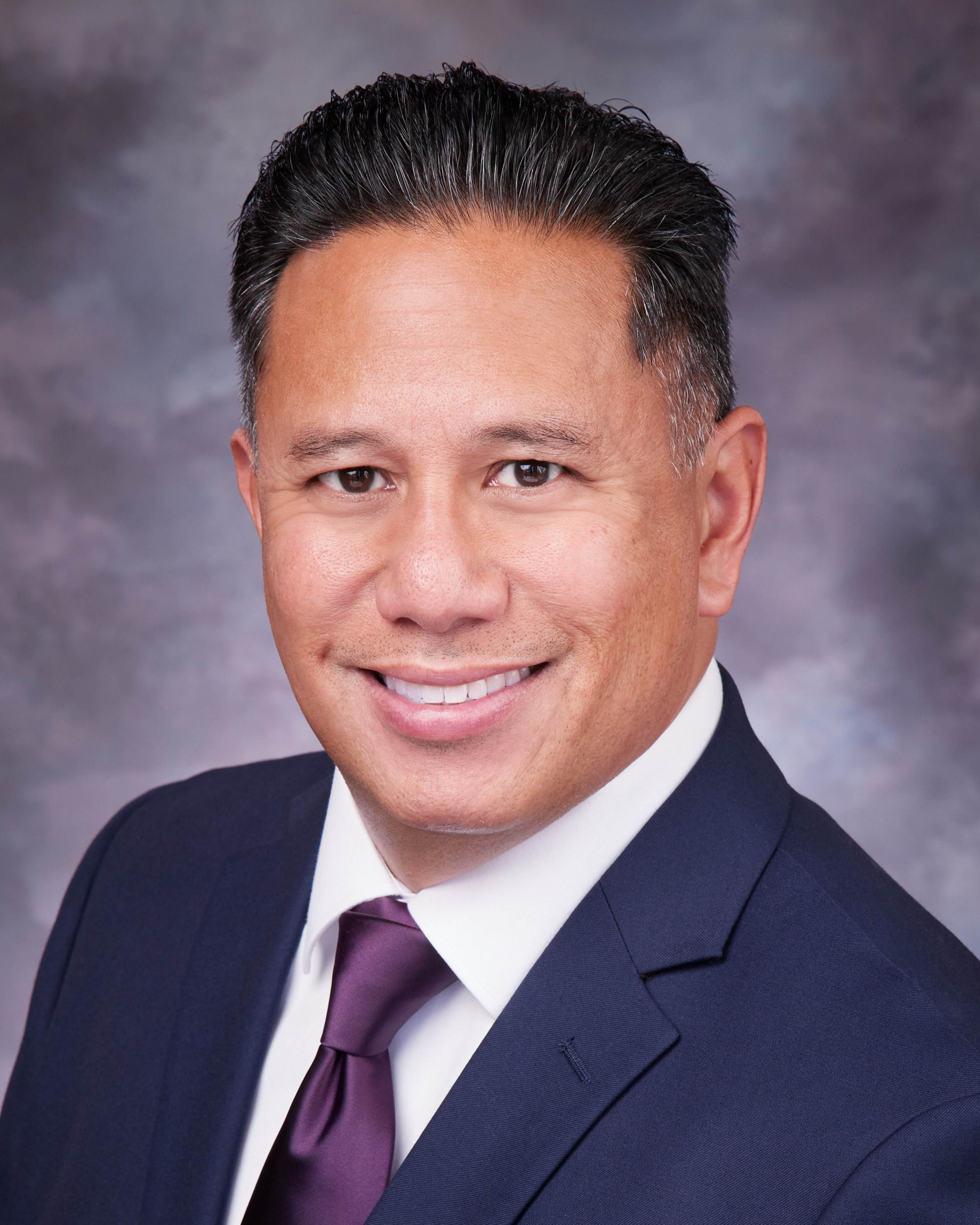
- Official portrait, 2025

Member-elect of the California State Assembly from the 67th district
- Assuming office December 7, 2026
- Succeeding: Sharon Quirk-Silva

Mayor Pro Tempore of Cerritos
- Incumbent
- Assumed office April 8, 2026
- Preceded by: Lynda P. Johnson
- In office March 13, 2013 – March 19, 2014
- Preceded by: Bruce W. Barrows
- Succeeded by: Carol Chen
- In office April 26, 2017 – April 25, 2018
- Preceded by: Naresh Solanki
- Succeeded by: Naresh Solanki

Member of the Cerritos City Council
- Incumbent
- Assumed office March 26, 2025
- In office March 11, 2011 – April 1, 2020

Mayor of Cerritos
- In office March 19, 2014 – March 11, 2015
- Preceded by: Bruce W. Barrows
- Succeeded by: Carol Chen
- In office April 25, 2018 – April 17, 2019
- Preceded by: Grace Hu
- Succeeded by: Naresh Solanki

Personal details
- Born: Mark Emmanuel Pulido; December 21, 1968 (age 57) Norwalk, California
- Party: Democratic
- Education: University of California, Los Angeles (BA); University of Chicago (MPP)

Mark Emmanuel Pulido (born December 21, 1968) is an American politician and the current Mayor Pro Tempore of Cerritos, California since 2026. He had acted as Mayor from 2014 to 2015 and 2018 to 2019 and Mayor Pro Tempore from 2013 to 2014 and 2017 to 2018. Pulido has also been a member of the Cerritos City Council since 2025, previously serving from 2011 to 2020. He was the first Filipino-American to serve as Mayor and on the City Council.

A member of the Democratic Party, Pulido is currently a candidate in the 2026 California State Assembly election, running for the 67th district.

== Early life ==
Mark Emmanuel Pulido was born on December 21, 1968 in Norwalk, California. His father, Rudy, worked as a bridge engineer who oversaw the construction of freeway overpasses and interchanges in Southern California. His mother, Esther, was an artist and, on her side, Pulido's grandfather, Alfredo, and great-grandfather, Alejo, were both servicemen with the Philippine Scouts. Pulido moved to Cerritos, California, in 1973. He attended Whitney High School and founded its Filipino club, Club Kaibigan, in 1984. He received his bachelor's degree in history and Asian American studies from the University of California, Los Angeles; he also became the university's first Filipino-American student body president in 1992. Pulido received his master's degree in public policy at the University of Chicago and was also named a Woodrow Wilson National Fellow.

== Career ==
Before serving on the Cerritos City Council, Pulido was a member of the ABC Unified School District Board for three terms from 2001 to 2011, serving as board president during the 2007–8 school year. The Los Angeles County Office Of Education recognized him as "Board Member of the Year" in 2009. He also worked as representative Alan Lowenthal's district director and was a legislative consultant for Robert Hertzberg, Herb Wesson, and Fabian Núñez.

Pulido was elected to the City Council on March 8, 2011, receiving the highest vote total in city history. During the council's annual reorganization meeting on March 13, 2013, he was elected Mayor Pro Tempore and unanimously became mayor on March 19, 2015. He was the first Filipino-American City Councilmember and Mayor. During his first term on the City Council, Pulido focused on "public safety, business and economic development, reinvesting in neighborhoods and reinvesting in neighborhood parks." The city also issued a record number of business licenses, which led to a historic year in sales.

Pulido was reelected to a second term on the City Council on March 11, 2015. He became Mayor Pro Tempore again on April 26, 2017, in a 3–2 vote. With his and Mayor Grace Hu's appointments, he broke a since-inception tradition in which each councilmember was given the chance to serve as Mayor Pro Tempore and then Mayor, blocking Councilmember Jim Edwards' nomination of Naresh Solanki for Mayor. It was later revealed that former Councilmember Bruce Barrows had a spreadsheet that laid out the "proper" mayoral sequence that would benefit him and his Republican allies, going back to 1993. Pulido was elected mayor for the second time on April 25, 2018. He was unable to run in the 2020 City Council election due to a rule that prevents more than two consecutive terms.

Pulido served on the CaliforniaVolunteers commission from 2013 to 2017 and was appointed by Governor Jerry Brown to the California Science Center Board of Directors and Los Angeles Memorial Coliseum Commission from 2017 to 2019.

On March 26, 2025, Pulido was elected to his third term on the City Council. California Attorney General Rob Bonta administered Pulido's oath of office. In May 2025, Pulido announced his candidacy in the 2026 California State Assembly election, running for the 67th district.

== Personal life ==
Pulido is married to Gloria Perlas Pulido, who was appointed Chair of the Cerritos Planning Commission in 2025. They have two children, Malia and Mark Jr.
