= Cerritos Center for the Performing Arts =

Entertainment venue in California, U.S.

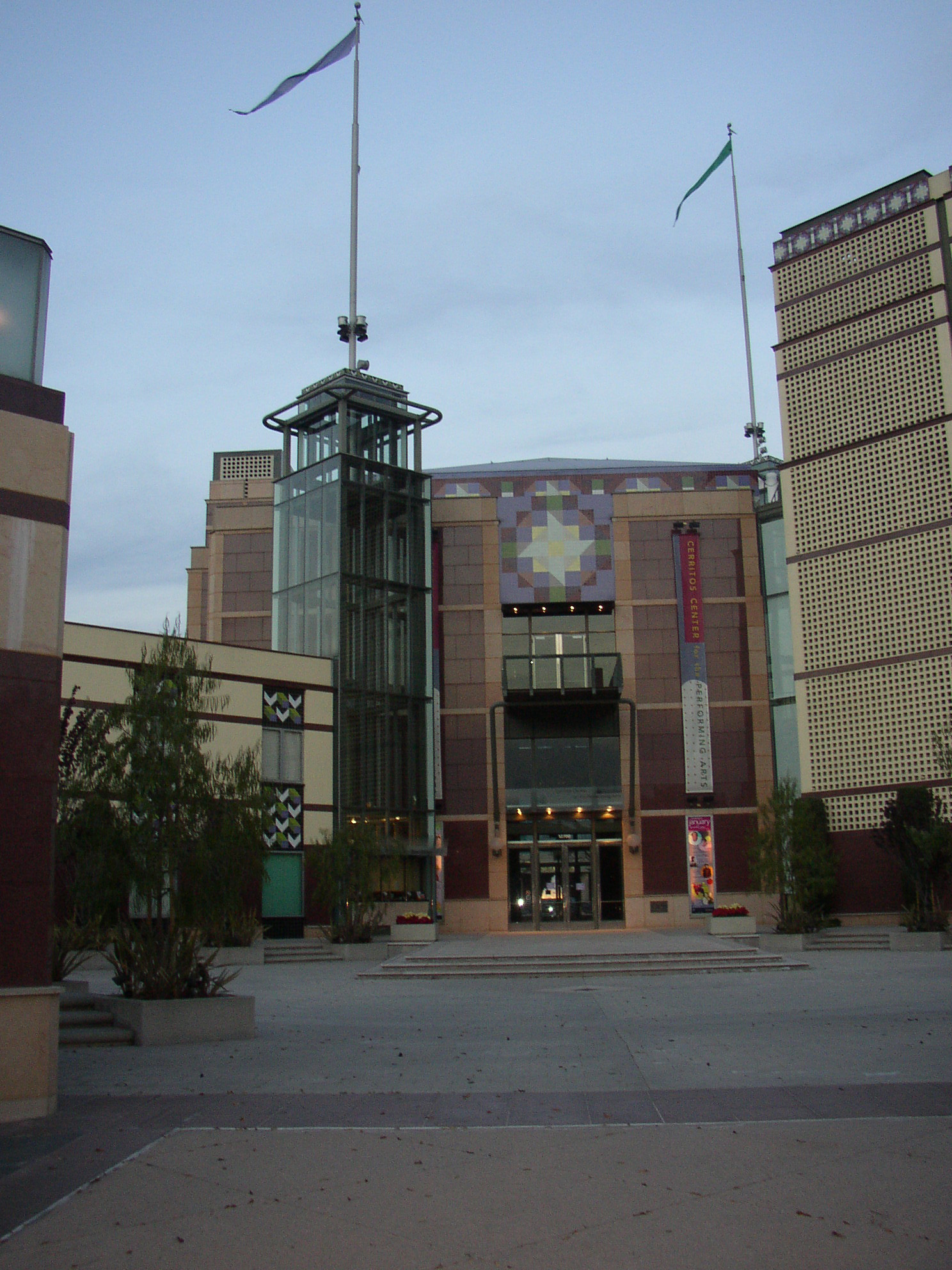
- Interactive map of Cerritos Center for the Performing Arts
- Address: 18000 Park Plaza Drive
- Location: Cerritos, California
- Coordinates: 33.86759°N 118.06168°W
- Owner: City of Cerritos
- Operator: City of Cerritos
- Capacity: 1,721
- Type: Performing arts center

Construction
- Opened: January 9, 1993
- Architect: Barton Myers Associates

Website
- www.cerritoscenter.com

The Cerritos Center for the Performing Arts (CCPA) is a 154,000-square-foot (14,300 m^{2}) entertainment and music venue in the Cerritos Towne Center of Cerritos, California. It is owned and operated by the City of Cerritos and it opened its doors to the public on January 9, 1993, offering performances in music, dance, and theater, and facilities for meetings, banquets, and special events.

The CCPA features a flexible theater capable of six different seating and stage configurations, ranging from a nearly 1,800-seat arena theater to a 900-seat recital hall.

== History and architecture ==
The Cerritos Center for the Performing Arts (CCPA) is a multi-configurational performing arts center. The hall features programming across music, dance, and theater, ranging from inaugural performances by Frank Sinatra to presentations by the Royal Shakespeare Company.

Plans for the construction of a community theater had been proposed in the Cerritos Towne Center since 1986; however, debate as to the size and influence of the theater vis-à-vis other venues in Southern California persisted.

The consultants, David Staples and Wally Russell of Theatre Projects Consultants from London, inspired city leaders with the details of Derngate Theatre in Northampton, England, where blocks of seats on rollers could be rearranged or removed completely, tailored to each performance. At the time, nothing like it existed in the United States.

Architects Barton Myers Associates of Los Angeles were hired to design a similar facility for Cerritos. It was decided that a large venue that could compete with the likes of the Long Beach Terrace Theater, Orange County Performing Arts Center, and the Los Angeles Music Center would be a better direction for the development of the community theater. In 1987, the layout plans included a main auditorium with six distinct seating configurations, a 5,100-square-foot (470 m^{2}) conference center, and a 200-seat theater with its own sound and lighting systems. Construction began shortly on the building, which incorporates glass walls, polished red granite, and horizontal bands of French limestone. Patterned ceramic tile roofs accent the exterior and lend the building a Mediterranean character. The tile patterns were created by the artist April Grieman, who also designed the fabric for the seats in the auditorium. As much of the building is seen from the high-rise office buildings and hotel that surround it, great care was given to designing the roof as a fifth facade of the building. A glass elevator tower topped with pyramids, thin spires, and pennants completed the final appearance. The interior includes a lobby featuring a curved grand staircase with etched glass, stylish fireplace, soaring ceiling, and artwork. The final price tag came out to be over $60 million.

More than 6,000 visitors attended the open house tours upon the CCPA's completion. The CCPA had a $4 million spending budget to attract performances in its inaugural season; Frank Sinatra performed for three nights at its opening.

== Seating configurations ==
With moveable seats, floors, ceilings, and stage areas, the theater can be transformed into customized seating configurations for each performance. For Broadway-style musicals, the theater can also transform into configurations featuring an orchestra pit.

- Arena - A 1,716-seat arena setting with 500 floor seats surrounded by box seats and balconies on one side for popular music, comedy, and jazz performances.
- Cabaret - A 1,324- to 1,504-seat cabaret setting with up to 67 tables and 412 chairs on a flat floor, surrounded by box seats and balconies, for jazz and other music performances.
- Concert - A 1,493- to 1,629-seat concert hall with in-the-round seating and acoustic concert ceiling panels for orchestras, recitals, and acoustic performances.
- Drama - A 921-seat proscenium theater for plays, recitals and chamber music performances.
- In the Round - A 1,934-seat in-the-round theater for popular music, comedy, and jazz performances.
- Lyric - A 1,419-seat proscenium theater for musical theater, dance, and popular music performances.

== Facilities ==
The Sierra Room/Sierra Theater at the Cerritos Center for the Performing Arts features a technologically advanced grid of tracks and moveable partitions, which can divide the 5,100-square-foot (470 m^{2}) space from one large open room to five smaller meeting places. A hidden retractable seating unit can be opened into part of the room, creating the Sierra Room Theater for fashion shows, guest speakers and presentations.

== Awards and recognition ==
- 1993–2001 Amusement Business Magazine Top 10 Venues - 5,000 seats or less in the United States.
- 1995 Performance Magazine "Theater of the Year"
- 1994 United States Institute of Theater Technology Honor Award
- 1993 Concrete Industry Paving Award
- 1993 Cabrillo Chapter of American Institute of Architects Design Award

In 1994, the CCPA received the United States Institute of Theater Technology's (USITT) highest honor, hailing the theater as "the most sophisticated project we've seen in terms of architecture, technology and urban design". Performance Magazine also acknowledged the center's accomplishments, naming it the number one theater in California (under 3,000 seats) for the third consecutive year.

== See also ==
- Cerritos, California
- Cerritos Auto Square
- Cerritos Millennium Library
- Cerritos Senior Center at Pat Nixon Park
- Cerritos Towne Center
- Los Cerritos Center
