= Rickey Cradle =

American baseball player (born 1973)

- Outfielder
- Born: June 20, 1973 (age 53); Norfolk, Virginia, U.S.
- Batted: Right Threw: Right

MLB debut
- July 1, 1998, for the Seattle Mariners

Last MLB appearance
- July 12, 1998, for the Seattle Mariners

MLB statistics
- Batting average: .143
- Home runs: 0
- Runs batted in: 2
- Stats at Baseball Reference

Teams
- Seattle Mariners (1998)

Rickey Nelson Cradle (born June 20, 1973) is an American former Major League Baseball (MLB) player who played in five games for the Seattle Mariners in 1998. He had one hit in seven at-bats, with two RBI. He also had one walk and one stolen base.

The Toronto Blue Jays selected Cradle in the fifth round of the 1991 MLB draft out of Cerritos High School in Cerritos, California. He also played football and basketball in high school. He signed with the Blue Jays, forgoing a commitment to play college baseball for the Cal State Fullerton Titans.

Cradle signed as a minor league free agent with Seattle after the 1997 season, receiving an invitation to spring training. He made his MLB debut on July 1 and played in his final game on July 12. He started one game, hitting a single off Darryl Kile in a win over the Colorado Rockies.

Cradle signed with the Detroit Tigers before the 1999 season and played one final season in Triple-A.

== Personal life ==
Cradle and his wife have five children and raise Rhodesian Ridgeback dogs.

After his playing career, Cradle became a firefighter in Torrance, California. In 2020, he was hospitalized for several months after contracting COVID-19 and suffering other health issues. He was unable to continue working as a firefighter.

During his playing career, Cradle resided in Cerritos.

Cradle's older brother played college baseball for the Long Beach State Dirt Bags, then played three seasons in the minors.
