= Whitney High School (Cerritos, California) =

Gretchen Whitney High School
- Whitney High School Seal

Location
- 16800 Shoemaker Avenue; Cerritos, California 90703; United States; 33.8781°N 118.0543°W

Information
- Type: Public Secondary
- Established: 1976
- Principal: Tuesday Stoffers
- Teaching staff: 39.66 (on an FTE basis)
- Grades: 7–12
- Enrollment: 1,009 (2026–2027)
- Student to teacher ratio: 25.67
- Campus: Suburban
- Colors: Black, white, and gold
- Athletics conference: 605 League, CIF
- Mascot: Wildcat
- Rival: Oxford Academy
- Accreditation: Blue Ribbon 1991, 1998, 2003, 2008, and 2014
- Yearbook: Kaleidoscope
- Website: www.whitneyhs.us

Gretchen A. Whitney High School, called Whitney High School or WHS, is a public school in Cerritos, California serving grades 7–12. It is in the ABC Unified School District. According to US News Report, as of August 2025, Whitney High School is ranked 1st in the state of California and ranked 16th nationally among all high schools.

== History ==
Whitney High School was founded on September 25, 1975 (under the name Gretchen A. Whitney Learning Center) as a community academic learning center. It was created by ABC superintendent Charles Hutchison, who envisioned Whitney to be a vocational school. The school refocused as an academic magnet/collegiate preparatory school. As a tribute to Hutchison, the current cafeteria is named the Hutch.

In 1997, half of Whitney's parking lot was purchased by a housing contractor to build a gated community adjacent to Whitney. In exchange, Whitney received funds to construct a gymnasium. In 2012, Whitney built a multi-media arts center featuring computer labs and a theater.

The school briefly went into lockdown in March 2023 due to a threat of a bomb in the school in a call to the local police department. No one was injured.

== Admission ==
Admission into Whitney is determined through mandatory placement testing. Students in elementary school are automatically tested during their sixth grade year, while students already in middle school or high school are required to take an additional writing test. Admissions are determined primarily through the California Assessment of Student Performance and Progress, with an additional criterion being the universally mandated essay examination.

== Academics ==
Whitney's curriculum, as of March 2025, included 18 Advanced Placement courses and 30 Honors courses, though students who attended Whitney High School were automatically placed in honors courses, except for math and physical education courses.

Whitney offers an "Early College Program" which began for the 2021-2022 school year. The program has students attending dual-enrollment classes at Cerritos College.

In 2026-2027, Whitney administered 1,321 AP tests with a 99% pass rate. Whitney students achieved an average SAT of 1413 and an average ACT of 31.5.

== Rankings ==
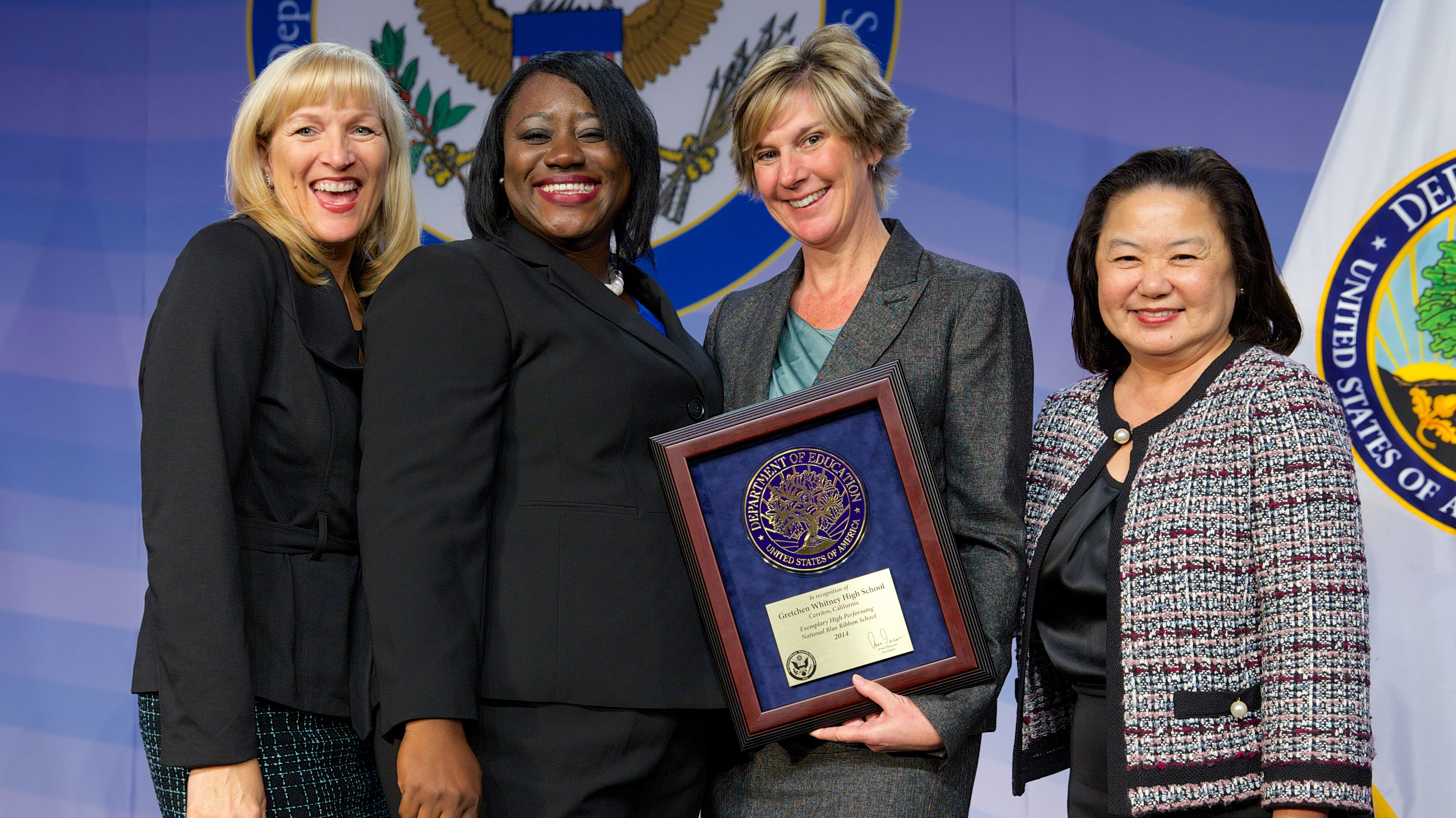
2014 National Blue Ribbon Schools Winners

In 1991, Whitney was recognized with the Department of Education's National Recognition Award as a Blue Ribbon School. Senator John F. Seymour spoke on the US Senate floor to recognize the school. Whitney is one of the three Blue Ribbon Lighthouse Schools Charter Members. The school was again honored as a Blue Ribbon school in 1998, 2003, 2008, and 2014. Whitney became the first school to receive 5 Blue Ribbon Awards. President George W. Bush's brother Neil, co-founder of an educational software company, has visited the campus several times, as he put it, "because of the respect the staff has for students. I’ve never seen anything like it. Every school should be this way."

Whitney has been honored with the California Distinguished School title six times: 1986, 1990, 1992, 1996, 2003, and 2007.

In 2005, the Associated Press rated Whitney High the best high school in California, based on its Academic Performance Index (API) score.

Whitney High has been featured in a special report done by Fox News in 2005. The report on mentoring featured Whitney's "Big Buddy/Little Buddy" system. Furthermore, CBS News's "Weekend Journal" also reported on Whitney, focusing on the public high school's academic achievements.

In 2006, the school was on Newsweek’s "America's Best High School" list. Whitney was not included in the top 100 high schools because "so many of [Whitney's] students score well above average on the SAT and ACT." However, Newsweek did include Whitney in "The Public Elites" section, and labeled Whitney as "a comprehensive school for high performers." Newsweek again recognized Whitney in the May 23, 2007 "America’s Best High School" edition. Similar to the 2006 edition, Whitney was included as 1 of the 19 "The Public Elite" high schools and was labeled as an "award-winning school with special emphasis on college admissions."

The passing rate for the California High School Exit Exam (CAHSEE) for Whitney students is 100%. Whitney received a six-year accreditation from the Western Association of Schools and Colleges (WASC) in 2004.

Business Week declared Whitney as having the "Best Overall Academic Performance" in 2009 for California.

U.S. News & World Report ranked Whitney High School as the No. 12 high school in the nation in the November 30, 2007 edition. Whitney was ranked No. 10 in the December 15, 2008 edition. Whitney was ranked the 3rd best high school in America for 2010 in the December 10, 2009 edition. Whitney was 1st in the state of California for 2016, and rank 19th nationally. Whitney was 1st in the state of California for 2018.

Newsweek ranked Whitney High School as the No. 4 high school in the nation in September 2014.

== Athletics ==
Whitney High is part of the CIF Division IV, and the mascot is the Wildcat. In its earliest years WHS did not have any school athletics at all, and they gradually added small sports teams in later years. However, their girls basketball team has recently enjoyed success, winning the CIF Division IV title for the 2024-2025 school year.

Whitney High is now part of the newly formed 605 league, Division 3, CIF Southern Section.

== Activities ==
The WHS Yearbook won First Place and Outstanding Theme at the 2013 American Scholastic Press Association Yearbook Competition.

WHS's award-winning robotics team participates in FIRST: For Inspiration and Recognition of Science and Technology, an organization founded in 1989 by Dean Kamen and Woodie Flowers to motivate young people in their schools and communities to reach an appreciation of science and technology. Currently the team competes in the FIRST Tech Challenge, and FIRST Lego League Challenge. Students also participate in outreach programs in robotics with local elementary schools, community groups, and summer RoboCamps.

Students have the opportunity to debate national issues in the Junior Statesmen of America program with other students from southern California.

"It's Finally Friday" (a.k.a. "IFF") is a televised show broadcast over the school's television network every Friday, from September 2003 and until June 2005, and brought back from 2006 to 2008.

The Whitney Independent News Network was founded during the 2009 – 2010 school year.

In 2009, the school ceased publishing Aspects, the student newspaper. In 2018, the school newspaper was brought back by the Newspaper Club and is called The Wildcat's Tale.

"Whitney High School Live" is Whitney's news program that airs three times a week during homeroom. It began in the 2014–2015 school year.

== School of Dreams ==
Whitney High is the subject of School of Dreams, a book written by the Pulitzer prize-winning journalist Edward Humes and published in September 2003. Humes spent the 2001–2002 school year at Whitney teaching a writing workshop, and used his case study of Whitney High to bring national attention to the pressures endured by the students of America's magnet schools.

== Slavery Reenactment Controversy ==
In September 2017, Whitney High School received criticism over a classroom simulation exercise that had been part of the eighth-grade history curriculum for approximately ten years. The activity was designed to teach students about the Atlantic slave trade by having teachers act as slave ship captains while students simulated the experience of enslaved people during the Middle Passage.

The exercise, conducted without students' prior knowledge or consent, involved binding students' wrists with masking tape, having them lie on the floor of a darkened classroom, and showing them clips from the 1977 miniseries Roots. Teachers described the activity in an email to parents as intended to help students "understand the psychological impact of slavery on Africans brought over to this country" by recreating "the voyage that slaves went on across the Atlantic Ocean."

The controversy began when parent Shardé Carrington received the advance notification email and objected to her son's participation. Teachers had instructed parents not to inform their children about the activity beforehand, stating it would be "more powerful" and "surprising" if students were unprepared for the simulation.

Carrington called the exercise "irresponsible at best, manipulative and dangerous at worst" and shared the email correspondence on Facebook. School administrators initially defended the practice, with the social studies department chair stating it had received "almost universal appreciation" over its decade-long implementation and came from a "nationally recognized supplier of curriculum."

The school discontinued the exercise on September 18, 2017. Superintendent Mary Sieu stated that the school would develop alternative methods to teach about slavery.

== Notable alumni ==
- Terisa Greenan, film producer, director, and actress
- Mark Pulido, two-time Mayor of Cerritos, current Mayor Pro Tempore and City Councilmember
- Julie Su, former United States Deputy Secretary of Labor, former acting United States Secretary of Labor
- Nancy Wang Yuen, sociologist, Professor of Ethnic Studies at Crafton Hills College
