= Cerritos Auto Square =

American automobile retail center

Coordinates: 33.861932°N 118.101742°W

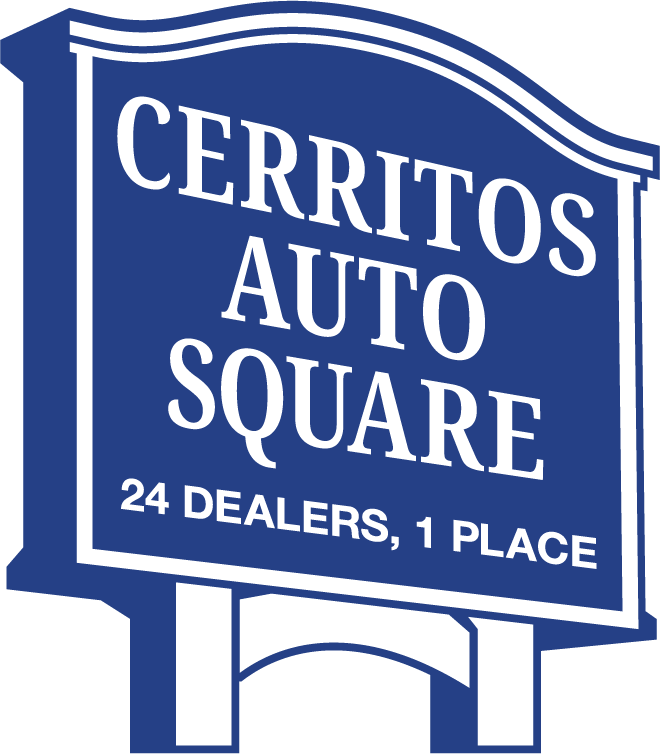
- Company type: auto mall
- Industry: auto retailing
- Founded: 1979
- Headquarters: 10903 Auto Square Drive Cerritos, CA 90703
- Website: https://www.cerritosautosquare.com/

The Cerritos Auto Square is an automobile retail center located in the city of Cerritos, California; it can be reached by taking 605 to South Street. Cerritos Auto Square states that it is the largest auto mall in the world with 29 import and domestic marques.

== History ==
In 1979, the Cerritos Redevelopment Agency began work on the improvement of Studebaker Road, and in October of that year, S & J Chevrolet broke ground for the first auto dealership in the Cerritos Auto Square, directly west of Interstate 605 and the Los Cerritos Center, between 183rd and South streets. Eventually it would be joined by other dealerships in buildings that featured a distinctive "New Orleans" style.

One of the first business locations in Cerritos was the General Telephone Company's service yard, replacing a turkey ranch on the northwest corner of Studebaker Road and 183rd Street. In 1988, the Los Cerritos Redevelopment Agency purchased the 8.5 acres (34,000 m^{2}) and made $1.2 million in improvements, including road improvements, landscaped medians and parkways, rocky waterfalls, and decorative street lights. The site was soon the new home of Moothart Chrysler-Plymouth and Victory Pontiac-GMC. A few years later, a Saturn dealer was added to make twenty-two dealer franchises in the Cerritos Auto Square. It started in 1995

Today, the Cerritos Auto Square provides the city of Cerritos with approximately $12 million a year in sales tax, and is its single largest source of revenue. In 2006, the Auto Square sold 48,241 automobiles, totaling over $1.1 billion in sales, or half of the total retail sales in the city.

== Marketing ==
The Cerritos Auto Square has an aggressive marketing campaign throughout Southern California. The Cerritos Auto Square Association advertises collectively via radio, television, and signage, as well as individual dealership advertisements through similar media.

=== Radio ===
The various advertisements heard throughout Southern California radio is perhaps the most widespread example of the Auto Square's collective advertising. Although no one dealership receives extra air time, the advertisements generally proclaim the low prices, sales, and reputation of the auto mall as the highest volume dealer. The popular jingles, "Take the 605 to South Street, come on, it's all there! Take the 605 to South Street, Cerritos Auto Square!" (Sung to the tune of The Orlons "South Street") or "We sell more, so you save more, Cerritos...Auto Square!" are ubiquitous and are good examples of effective advertising strategies using simple, easy-to-remember lyrics.

=== Television ===
Local television stations and cable companies throughout the Southland air or insert advertisements for the Cerritos Auto Square collectively or as individual dealerships located within the auto mall. The television advertisements play the same jingle mentioned above and characteristically involve computer animations of non sequitur images or of Jim Varney as his popular character Ernest P. Worrell, who served as a spokesperson for the Cerritos Auto Square throughout the 1990s. A more recent spokesman for the Cerritos Auto Square was stuntman Super Dave Osborne, and he was featured prominently in the television ads. Since January 2005, the Auto Square has also been launching television spots that depict the "downside to buying in bulk" in order to save money. Clips and the jingle can be found in the Auto Square's web site here .

=== Signage ===
The Cerritos Auto Square sign which can be seen from the southbound Interstate 605 approaching the South Street exit.

The Cerritos Auto Square sign overlooking Interstate 605 is perhaps the most well known symbol of the auto mall. It is a tall blue and white sign that states: "Cerritos Auto Square: South Street Exit: World's Largest." It also features a flashing marquee that is used for individual advertisements for dealers in the Auto Square, as well as for shows at the Cerritos Center for the Performing Arts.

== Future expansion ==
On February 14, 2006 meeting of the Cerritos Economic Commission, Applied Development Economics discussed and suggested the diversification of the Cerritos Auto Square to possibly include RVs, motorcycles, trucks and marine vehicles. The expansion of the nearby Interstate 5 in the coming years in southeast Los Angeles would provide several opportunities for diversifying the Auto Square's selection. It was also stated in the meeting that more luxury lines were needed to expand the selection and increase Cerritos' lead in the automobile retail sector.

== Challenges ==
"Although the current consensus among economists and automotive experts portends a slight softening of the nationwide demand for cars and trucks, the Auto Square will continue to benefit from its location and reputation," states the Cerritos City Manager.

== Complete listing of makes and marques ==
- Acura
- Buick
- Chevrolet
- Chrysler
- Dodge
- Ford
- GMC
- Honda
- Hyundai
- Infiniti
- Jaguar
- Jeep
- Kia
- Land Rover
- Lexus
- Lincoln
- Mazda
- Mitsubishi
- Nissan
- Ram
- Saturn
- Scion
- Toyota
- Volkswagen
