= Cerritos Veterans Memorial =

Veterans memorial in California, USA

- The Cerritos Veterans Memorial looking south-west. Behind the memorial on the right is city hall. The parking lot behind the memorial belongs to Cerritos High School
- Artist: James T. Russell
- Medium: Stainless steel
- Subject: Flame atop a reflecting pool
- Dimensions: 20 ft (6.1 m) tall
- Condition: Intact
- Location: Cerritos, California
- 33°51′58.19″N 118°3′51.74″W
- Owner: City of Cerritos

The Cerritos Veterans Memorial, located in Cerritos, California is a 20-foot-high (6.1 m) sculpture dedicated in honor of local veterans. The sculpture is part of a "Cerritos Veterans Project," which aims to preserve the stories of veterans who are current or former residents of the City of Cerritos. The sculpture, which was designed and built by artist James T. Russell, sits on the grounds of the Cerritos Civic Center.

== The memorial ==
The memorial was dedicated at the first annual Veterans Day ceremony on November 11, 2006.It features a 20-foot-high (6.1 m) stainless steel sculpture in the shape of a flame atop a reflecting pool. There are five pedestals surrounding the pool, each containing the emblem of one branch of the United States armed forces: Army, Navy, Air Force, Marines, and the Coast Guard. Off to the side, there are two other pedestals, one in honor of the Merchant Marine, and another honoring all 32 groups who were recognized by Congress for their efforts during World War I and World War II.

The memorial serves as a focal point for the various official city ceremonies which have a patriotic theme. The dedication ceremony in 2006 served as the city's first annual Veterans Day ceremony, and the first annual Memorial Day ceremony took place in 2008. (Note: There was a small private Memorial Day ceremony at the memorial in 2007, which served as the seed for the official ceremonies which started in 2008) Starting in 2007, the city also moved its Let Freedom Ring ceremony to celebrate the Fourth of July to the grounds around the Cerritos Veterans Memorial, (Note: Prior to 2007, the ceremony took place at Cerritos Park East) and in 2010 the city held its Patriot Day concert in that venue.

== Controversies ==
=== Memorial design ===
Pedestals honoring the Merchant Marine and other groups who contributed to the war efforts. These pedestals are in the vicinity, but not part of the sculpture.

During the November 22, 2005, Cerritos City Council meeting, a controversy erupted as to whether there should be a sixth pedestal around the pool with the emblem of the Merchant Marine. After a very long public discussion, a compromise was reached where it was decided to put a pedestal with the emblem of the Merchant Marine, but place that pedestal off to the side and not include it with the emblems of the 5 primary branches. In order to be sensitive to other groups, it was also decided to have a pedestal honoring all the groups recognized by Congress for the contributions during World War I and World War II.
