= Cerritos High School =

- The Don Crest

Location
- 12500 E. 183rd Street; Cerritos, California 90703; United States; 33.864726°N 118.063927°W

Information
- Type: Public high school
- Established: September 1971
- School district: ABC Unified School District
- Superintendent: Gina Zietlow
- Principal: Crechena Wise
- Faculty: 88.37 FTEs
- Grades: 9–12
- Enrollment: 2,083 (as of 2023–2024)
- Student to teacher ratio: 23.57
- Colors: Black, gold, and red
- Mascot: Don
- Team name: Dons
- Rival: Artesia High School, Gahr High School, Whitney High School
- Newspaper: The Informer
- Website: Cerritos High School website

2000 Staff vs Student soccer game

Cerritos High School, also called CHS, is a comprehensive, four-year public high school located in Cerritos, California, serving grades 9–12. It is part of the ABC Unified School District.

As of the 2014–15 school year, the school had an enrollment of 2,176 students and 86.2 classroom teachers (on an FTE basis), for a student–teacher ratio of 25.2:1. There were 354 students (16.3% of enrollment) eligible for free lunch and 209 (9.6% of students) eligible for reduced-cost lunch.

== History ==
Cerritos High School began its history in September 1971 by sharing the campus of nearby Gahr High School. Rapidly increasing student population during the 1970s prompted the construction of its current campus, located across the street from the Civic Center, Cerritos Millennium Library, and Cerritos Sheriffs Station in 1973.

== Student profile ==
Student enrollment by ethnicity

Ethnic Group	Percentage
White	7.2%
Black	6.7%
Hispanic and Latino American	13.3%
Asian/Pacific Islander	69.4%
American Indian or Alaska Native	0.3%

=== CIF-SS Championships ===
- Football: 2023
- Boys Basketball: 2024
- Boys Swim: 2000, 2001, 2014, 2015, 2016 2002, 2022
- Boys Golf: 2008
- Boys Tennis: 2008, 2009
- Girls Tennis: 2013, 2014
- Girls Swim: 2013, 2014, 2015, 2016
- Baseball: 1989
- Softball: 2000, 2001
- Softball DIV II : 1999, 2000

== Notable alumni ==
- Justin H. Min, class of 2007—actor best known for The Umbrella Academy
- Tony Ahn, class of 1996—K-pop singer, H.O.T member
- Rickey Cradle, class of 1991—former Seattle Mariner
- Jeff Hearron, class of 1977—former Toronto Blue Jay
- Toby Henderson—pro BMX rider, inventor of the Henderson Hop, and ABA (BMX) Hall of Fame
- Ben Howland, class of 1975—former UCLA Head Basketball Coach (2003–2013)
- Eddie Lewis, class of 1992—Los Angeles Galaxy player
- Roger Lodge—host of Blind Date
- Todd McMillon, class of 1991—former NFL cornerback, Chicago Bears, and Gap model
- Ed Morrissey—conservative blogger at Hot Air
- Jae Park, class of 2010—Top 6 of K-pop Star season 1 (Survival Audition Kpopstar), formerly a musician under JYP Entertainment, in a group called Day6
- DJ Rhettmatic—hip hop DJ and producer/member of the Beat Junkies
- Lela Rochon, class of 1982—actor, most notably in the films Waiting to Exhale and The Chamber
- Jorge Salcedo—pro soccer player, Head UCLA Men's Soccer Coach
- Dave Serrano, class of 1982—Head Baseball Coach Tennessee
- Han Ye-seul—Korean actress
- Eddie Soto—soccer player, and current head coach at CSUDH Toros
- Kirsten Vangsness, class of 1990—actress, Criminal Minds
- Tim Walton—baseball, Philadelphia Phillies, Head Coach of University of Florida softball team
- Carlos de la Garza, class of 1992—Grammy Award winning producer and musician
