= Cerritos, California =

City in California, United States

- City
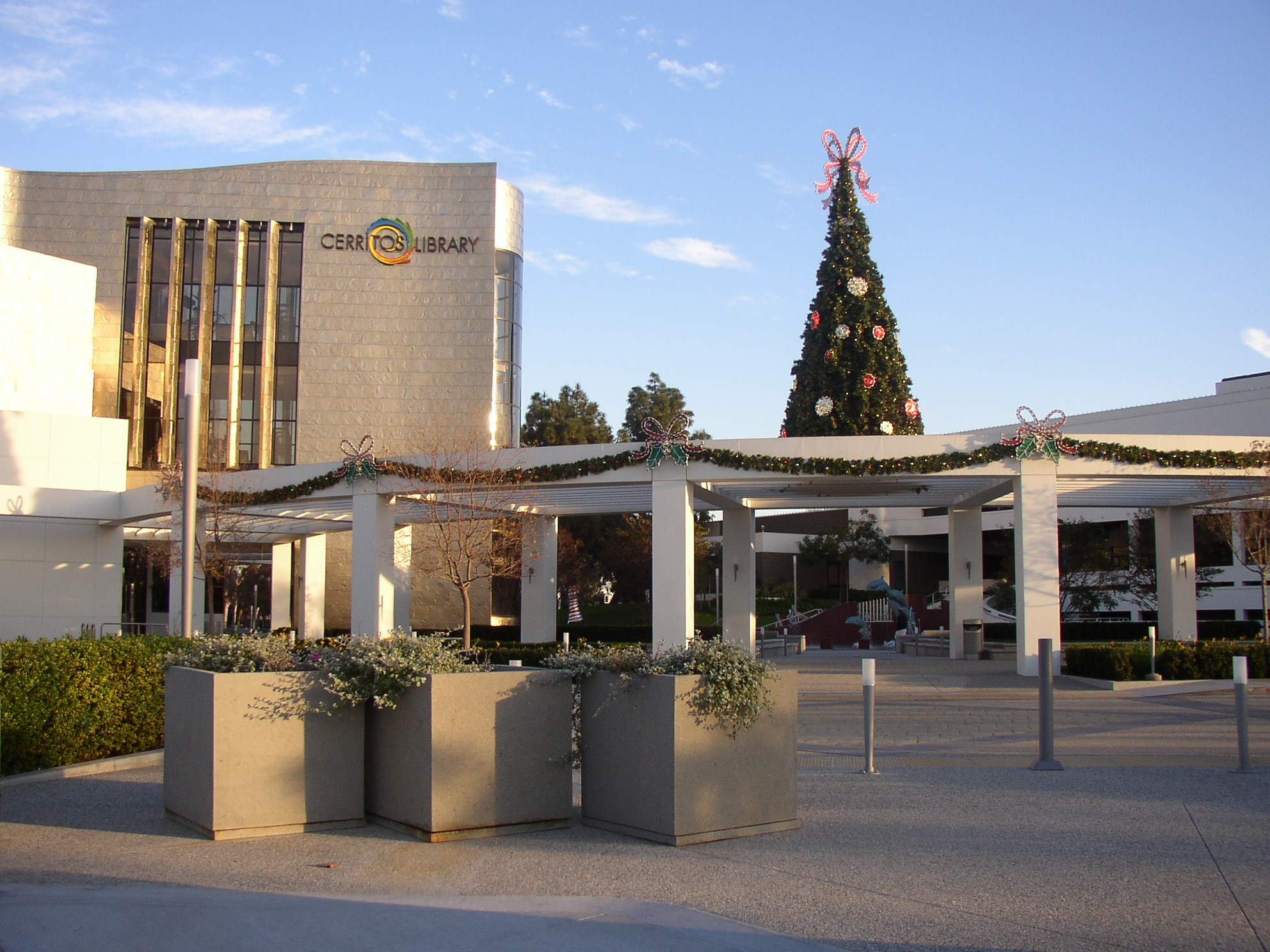
- Cerritos Library in 2004

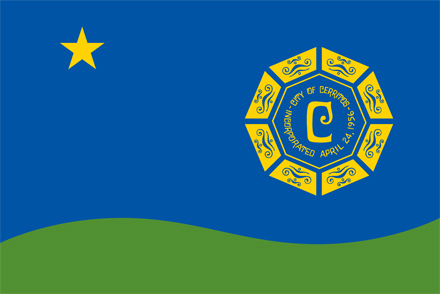
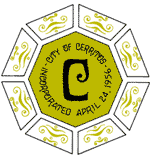
- Flag Seal
- Motto(s): "A City With Vision", "Progress Through Commitment", "A History In Progress", "A Prestige Address"
- Interactive map of Cerritos, California
- Location within Greater Los Angeles Location in California Location in the United States
- Coordinates: 33°52′6″N 118°4′3″W
- Country: United States
- State: California
- County: Los Angeles
- Incorporated: April 24, 1956

Government
  - Type: Council–manager
  - Body: City council: Lynda P. Johnson (Mayor); Mark E. Pulido (Mayor Pro Tem); Jennifer Hong; Sophia M. Tse; Frank Aurelio Yokoyama
  - City manager: Robert A. Lopez

Area
  - Total: 8.86 sq mi (22.94 km^{2})
  - Land: 8.73 sq mi (22.60 km^{2})
  - Water: 0.13 sq mi (0.34 km^{2}) 1.48%
- Elevation: 46 ft (14 m)

Population (2020)
  - Total: 49,578
  - Density: 5,681.0/sq mi (2,193.45/km^{2})
- Time zone: UTC−8 (Pacific)
  - Summer (DST): UTC−7 (PDT)
- ZIP Codes: 90701, 90703
- Area code: 562
- FIPS code: 06-12552
- GNIS feature IDs: 241229, 2409431
- Website: www.cerritos.gov

Cerritos (/səˈriːtoʊz/; Spanish for "Little hills") is a city in Los Angeles County, California, United States, and is one of several cities that constitute the Gateway Cities of southeast Los Angeles County. It was incorporated on April 24, 1956. As of 2020, the population was 49,578. It is part of the Los Angeles–Long Beach–Anaheim, California Metropolitan Statistical Area designated by the Office of Management and Budget.

== History ==
=== Early history ===
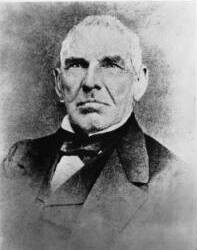
Don Juan Temple purchased Rancho Los Cerritos, covering modern day Cerritos, in 1843.

Cerritos was originally inhabited by Native Americans belonging to the Tongva (or "People of the Earth"). The Tongva were called the "Gabrieleños" by the Spanish settlers after the nearby Mission San Gabriel Arcángel. The Tongva were the largest group of indigenous peoples in Southern California as well as the most developed in the region. The Tongva lived off the land, deriving food from the animals or plants that could be gathered, snared or hunted, and grinding acorns as a staple. No Tongva village sites were found within the city, but it was a common passing point between the natives.

Beginning in the late 15th century, Spanish explorers arrived in the New World and worked their way to the California coast in 1542. The colonization process included "civilizing" the native populations in California by establishing various missions. Soon afterward, a town called El Pueblo de Nuestra Señora la Reina de los Ángeles de Porciúncula (today known as Los Angeles) would be founded and prosper with the aid of subjects from New Spain and Native American labor. One soldier, Manuel Nieto, was granted a large plot of land by the Spanish King Charles III in 1784, which he named Rancho Los Nietos. It covered 300,000 acres (120,000 hectares) of eastern Los Angeles County and western Orange County. Juan José Nieto was left in charge of his father's property following his death in 1804.

Due to the nationalization of church property by the Mexican government, Governor José Figueroa signed a document on May 17, 1834, that confirmed the land to the Nieto heirs, but divided into five ranchos. Juan José Nieto retained the largest plot, called Rancho Los Coyotes. Nieto called the area of Rancho Los Coyotes "cerritos" or "little hills". He sold the ranch to Juan Bautista Leandry in 1840, renaming it "La Buena Esperanza", although it was still widely known as Rancho Los Coyotes. Leandry died in 1842 and his widow, Francisca Uribe, married Francisco de Campo; they lived in the ranch house for the next twenty years. Andrés Pico had also become a half-owner of the ranch by 1855.

In the 1850s, the de Campos and Pico ran into financial trouble and ended up transferring ownership of the rancho to Abel Stearns. Stearns, after being threatened with losing all of his property due to delinquent taxes, sold most of his property to the Robinson Trust in 1868. In 1869, Daniel Gridley bought 1,600 acres (650 ha) of the former Rancho Los Coyotes from the Trust and began to develop his own farm. A three-day auction in February 1875 encouraged farmers to buy land in the area. When Pacific Electric extended its line to Santa Ana in 1906, businessmen encouraged the company to build its line straight through the area, furthering business.

=== Incorporation ===
In 1955, members of the Artesia Chamber of Commerce began to move towards incorporation of the city. They planned to have Artesia encompass the area south of Alondra Boulevard to the confluence of the San Gabriel River and Coyote Creek and become a more residential area, pushing the dairymen out. They dairymen planned create a vote to incorporate an agricultural community separate from Artesia, which they called Dairy Valley. The city's name symbolized the more than 400 dairies and 100,000 cows found within its limits. The cows outnumbered the 3,439 residents by a factor of 29 to 1. The incorporation election was held in 1956, and the city was voted to be incorporated, with 54.9% of respondents choosing that option, with a difference of only 60 votes. The city of Dairy Valley was incorporated on April 24, 1956. Jack R. Bettencourt was elected to be Dairy Valley's first mayor that evening.

In November 1958, Dairy Valley voted to change from a general law city to a charter city, gaining more local power and control over zoning. Mayor Jim Albers was threatened with recall in 1960 following a controversy over declining the location of a hospital, which he feared would have a negative effect on neighboring dairies. The city hall was dedicated on June 11, 1960. As land values and property taxes in California rose in the early 1960s, agriculture became increasingly unprofitable, and development pressures increased. Most dairymen were retiring or moving to Chino or the Central Valley. Freeways constructed in the area displaced farmers but made the city more attractive to commuting homeowners.

In a special election held on July 16, 1963, residents voted to permit large-scale residential development. In 1965, it was voted that the Artesia, Bloomfield, and Carmenita school districts were to combine to become the ABC Unified School District. As a reflection of its newly planned suburban orientation, the city's name was formally changed to Cerritos on January 10, 1967, naming it after the nearby Rancho Los Cerritos and to associate with Cerritos College in neighboring Norwalk. Other names in contention were "Los Coyotes" and "Freeway City". The city planned to appeal to middle-class homeowners, with an abundance of commercial and recreation centers.

Between 1970 and 1972, Cerritos was the fastest-growing city in California. Its population grew from 4,373 in 1968 to 40,750 in 1973. Artesia citizens rejected a vote to consolidate with Cerritos in 1971. In June 1972, the city dedicated its own library facility, the Cerritos Library, separate from the LA County Library system. The Los Cerritos Center also fully opened that year. A new city hall with increased capacity adjacent to the library was dedicated in 1978; it was the nation's first solar-heated city hall complex. In the 1970s, the city was known for its restrictive signage ordinances, including a well-known incident in which toy company Toys "R" Us was not allowed to reverse the "R" on their store sign. Ground was broken on the Cerritos Auto Square in 1979.

On August 31, 1986, Aeroméxico Flight 498, on approach to Los Angeles International Airport from Mexico City, was struck by a small Piper aircraft. A total of 82 people died, including 15 people on the ground. The city's transportation shuttle system, Cerritos on Wheels (COW), went into service in August 1993. In 1994, the Cerritos Towne Center was completed, with the Cerritos Center for the Performing Arts within first opening its doors in January a year earlier. To celebrate the coming of the millennium in 2000, the city conducted a $40 million renovation of its library, which was completed in 2002. In 2006, the city celebrated its golden anniversary with the unveiling of a sculpture garden in the civic center.

== Geography ==
According to the United States Census Bureau, the city has a total area of 8.9 square miles (23.05 km^{2}); 8.7 square miles (22.53 km^{2}) is land and 0.1 square miles (0.26 km^{2}) (1.48%) is water.

Cerritos lies along the Los Angeles County and Orange County border. The cities bordering Cerritos on the Los Angeles County side include Artesia in the center, Bellflower, Lakewood, Norwalk, Santa Fe Springs and La Mirada. Buena Park and La Palma border the city on the Orange County side. Other cities in the region include Cypress in Orange County, and Hawaiian Gardens and Long Beach in Los Angeles County.

The former postal ZIP code of Cerritos was 90701 and was shared with the city of Artesia; however, it was later changed to the exclusive 90703 to accommodate the increasing number of new addresses in the city during the mid-1990s.

=== Climate ===
Cerritos, California

Climate chart (precipitation, max. and min. temperature)
| J | F | M | A | M | J | J | A | S | O | N | D |
| 3 68 46 | 3 68 48 | 2.4 69 50 | 0.6 73 53 | 0.2 74 58 | 0.1 78 61 | 0 83 65 | 0.1 85 66 | 0.2 83 64 | 0.4 79 58 | 1.1 73 50 | 1.8 69 45 |
- █ Average max. and min. temperatures in °F
- █ Precipitation totals in inches
- Source: Weather.com / NWS
Metric conversion
| J | F | M | A | M | J | J | A | S | O | N | D |
| 75 20 8 | 76 20 9 | 62 21 10 | 15 23 12 | 5.8 23 14 | 2 26 16 | 0.5 28 18 | 2.5 29 19 | 6.1 28 18 | 10 26 14 | 28 23 10 | 45 21 7 |
- █ Average max. and min. temperatures in °C
- █ Precipitation totals in mm

Cerritos, as well as most of coastal Southern California, generally has a Mediterranean climate. Summers are warm to hot, and winters are mild, rarely falling below freezing. Precipitation occurs predominantly during the winter months.

Cerritos also has a unique "semi-marine" climate pattern within Los Angeles County. The fog that typically covers the beach cities rarely reaches Cerritos, but the breeze that comes along the San Gabriel River from the Pacific Ocean has a significant cooling effect. As a result, Cerritos is rarely affected by the smog, Santa Ana winds and smothering heat of the Los Angeles Basin.

== Demographics ==
Historical population
| Census | Pop. | Note | %± |
|---|---|---|---|
| 1880 | 166 | | — |
| 1960 | 3,508 | | — |
| 1970 | 15,856 | | 352.0% |
| 1980 | 53,020 | | 234.4% |
| 1990 | 53,240 | | 0.4% |
| 2000 | 51,488 | | −3.3% |
| 2010 | 49,041 | | −4.8% |
| 2020 | 49,578 | | 1.1% |
| 2024 (est.) | 46,851 | ▼ | −5.5% |
U.S. Decennial Census; 1860–1870 1880-1890; 1900 1910 1920; 1930 1940 1950; 1960 1970 1980; 1990 2000 2010; 2020

=== Racial and ethnic composition ===
Cerritos city, California – Racial and ethnic composition Note: the US Census treats Hispanic/Latino as an ethnic category. This table excludes Latinos from the racial categories and assigns them to a separate category. Hispanics/Latinos may be of any race.
| Race / Ethnicity (NH = Non-Hispanic) | Pop 1980 | Pop 1990 | Pop 2000 | Pop 2010 | Pop 2020 | % 1980 | % 1990 | % 2000 | % 2010 | % 2020 |
|---|---|---|---|---|---|---|---|---|---|---|
| White alone (NH) | 29,328 | 19,035 | 11,040 | 8,141 | 6,340 | 55.31% | 36.37% | 21.44% | 16.60% | 12.79% |
| Black or African American alone (NH) | 4,150 | 3,849 | 3,386 | 3,283 | 3,155 | 7.83% | 7.35% | 6.58% | 6.69% | 6.36% |
| Native American or Alaska Native alone (NH) | 255 | 151 | 75 | 51 | 61 | 0.48% | 0.29% | 0.15% | 0.10% | 0.12% |
| Asian alone (NH) | 11,542 | 23,441 | 29,989 | 30,163 | 30,810 | 21.77% | 44.79% | 58.24% | 61.51% | 62.14% |
| Native Hawaiian or Pacific Islander alone (NH) | 11,542 | 23,441 | 89 | 119 | 191 | 21.77% | 44.79% | 0.17% | 0.24% | 0.39% |
| Other race alone (NH) | 190 | 98 | 101 | 83 | 240 | 0.36% | 0.19% | 0.20% | 0.17% | 0.48% |
| Mixed race or Multiracial (NH) | x | x | 1,459 | 1,318 | 1,689 | x | x | 2.83% | 2.69% | 3.41% |
| Hispanic or Latino (any race) | 7,555 | 6,666 | 5,349 | 5,883 | 7,092 | 14.25% | 12.74% | 10.39% | 12.00% | 14.30% |
| Total | 53,020 | 53,240 | 51,488 | 49,041 | 49,578 | 100.00% | 100.00% | 100.00% | 100.00% | 100.00% |

=== 2020 census ===
As of the 2020 census, Cerritos had a population of 49,578. The population density was 5,681.0 inhabitants per square mile (2,193.4/km^{2}). The age distribution was 17.8% under the age of 18, 8.1% aged 18 to 24, 22.0% aged 25 to 44, 27.3% aged 45 to 64, and 24.8% who were 65 years of age or older. The median age was 46.4 years. For every 100 females, there were 91.9 males, and for every 100 females age 18 and over there were 89.8 males age 18 and over.

The racial makeup of Cerritos was 15.0% White, 6.6% African American, 0.4% Native American, 62.6% Asian, 0.4% Pacific Islander, 5.7% from other races, and 9.2% from two or more races. Hispanic or Latino residents of any race were 14.3% of the population.

100.0% of residents lived in urban areas, while 0.0% lived in rural areas. The census reported that 99.4% of the population lived in households, 0.2% lived in non-institutionalized group quarters, and 0.4% were institutionalized.

There were 16,019 households, of which 32.6% had children under the age of 18 living in them. Of all households, 64.5% were married-couple households, 2.6% were cohabiting couple households, 10.8% were households with a male householder and no spouse or partner present, and 22.2% were households with a female householder and no spouse or partner present. About 13.3% of all households were made up of individuals, and 8.6% had someone living alone who was 65 years of age or older. The average household size was 3.08. There were 13,317 families (83.1% of all households).

There were 16,374 housing units at an average density of 1,876.2 units per square mile (724.4 units/km^{2}), of which 2.2% were vacant. The homeowner vacancy rate was 0.3% and the rental vacancy rate was 3.8%. Of occupied units, 76.4% were owner-occupied and 23.6% were occupied by renters.

=== 2023 ACS estimates ===
In 2023, the US Census Bureau estimated that the median household income was $133,953, and the per capita income was $54,839. About 5.0% of families and 5.9% of the population were below the poverty line.

=== 2000 ancestry and birthplace ===
According to Mapping L.A., Korean (17.1%) and Chinese (11.2%) were the most common ancestries in 2000. Korea (26.5%) and the Philippines (16.7%) were the most common foreign places of birth.

== Economy ==
The two major sources of revenue for Cerritos are a retail sales tax and interest income from its general fund.

Employment within Cerritos is primarily in two districts, Los Cerritos Shopping Center and Cerritos Industrial Park. Businesses found in Cerritos Industrial Park provide jobs in light manufacturing and assembly of electronic and automotive parts, among other things. United Parcel Service, the city's largest employer with a staff of 6,000, is in the park. In 2010, Los Cerritos Center provided for 4,450 full and part-time positions, and the Cerritos Auto Square employs 2,160 people. Retail and industrial trades are responsible for Cerritos' $2 billion taxable retail sales and $7.2 billion assessed property valuation.

According to the California State Board of Equalization, Cerritos residents are the second-highest retail spenders in California (second to Beverly Hills), averaging $36,544 per resident. Applied Development Economics, in a presentation for the Cerritos Economic Commission on February 14, 2006, stated total annual household spending on retail is about $365 million a year with new car dealerships, grocery stores, department stores, service stations and eating places having the strongest demands.

A business survey conducted by Applied Development Economics in February 2006 revealed the total consumer breakdown in Cerritos is: 25% from residents from other parts of Southern California, about 21.9% from Cerritos residents, 18% from commuters, 16% from neighboring communities, 13% from business to business/employee transactions, 10% from residents of Orange County, 5% from households from outside of Southern California, mainly to purchase vehicles from the Auto Square.

=== Cerritos Auto Square ===
The Cerritos Auto Square is an auto mall combining all auto dealers within Cerritos into one large three-block center accessible through two freeways.

=== Los Cerritos Center ===
Since September 1971, the Los Cerritos Center has been an integral source of retail tax revenue. The total gross lease area is 1,288,245 square feet (119,682 m^{2}) and is the city's largest tax revenue source, producing $800 per square foot in 2015.

=== Cerritos Towne Center ===
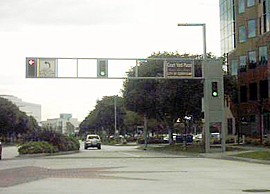
The Towne Center has a decorative paving at the intersection.

The Cerritos Towne Center is a power center that combines offices, retail, hotel and entertainment facilities in one master planned project. The Towne Center includes the Cerritos Center for the Performing Arts, a 203-room Sheraton hotel and more than one million square feet (93,000 m^{2}) of office space. The retail portion of the project includes several anchors and specialty shops. The project is bounded by 183rd Street to the south, Bloomfield Avenue to the west, Shoemaker Avenue to the east and the Artesia Freeway (Route 91) to the north.

=== The Magnolia Power Project ===
The uncertainty of availability of electricity in California prompted the city of Cerritos on February 13, 2003, in conjunction with the cities of Anaheim, Burbank, Colton, Glendale and Pasadena to participate in the Magnolia Power Project, which authorized the construction of a 310-megawatt power plant in Burbank. Cerritos receives 10 megawatts, or 4% of the total output, to power public facilities, park lighting, traffic signals and water wells. Excess power (approximately five megawatts) is sold to public and/or private agencies.

== Arts and culture ==
The Cerritos Fine Arts and Historical Commission has an "Art in Public Places Program" whereby the city commissions artists to create sculptures and fountains to be displayed in public points of interest, commercial property and gateways into the city. Los Cerritos Community News serves the city.

=== Tournament of Roses Parade ===
Since 2002, the City of Cerritos has participated in the Tournament of Roses Parade held every New Year's Day in Pasadena. Floats in the parade are awarded prizes in the Tournament of Roses Parade.

=== Cerritos Center for the Performing Arts ===
The Cerritos Center for the Performing Arts (CCPA) features live performances in music, magic, comedy, dance and drama. The 154,000-square-foot (14,300 m^{2}) arts center has movable seats, floors, ceilings and stage areas, with a theater that can transform into six distinctive seating configurations, ranging in capacity from 921 to 1,800 seats. The facility also houses three additional meeting and banquet areas. The CCPA was designed by architect Barton Myers.

The cost of the CCPA had reached over $60 million by the end of construction and scheduling. It was designed to serve as a cultural icon for people in the community and formally opened its doors on January 9, 1993, with a four-day performance by Frank Sinatra.

The CCPA collected four awards for design shortly after its opening and has been named one of the top grossing theaters in its category in the United States.

=== Cerritos Library ===
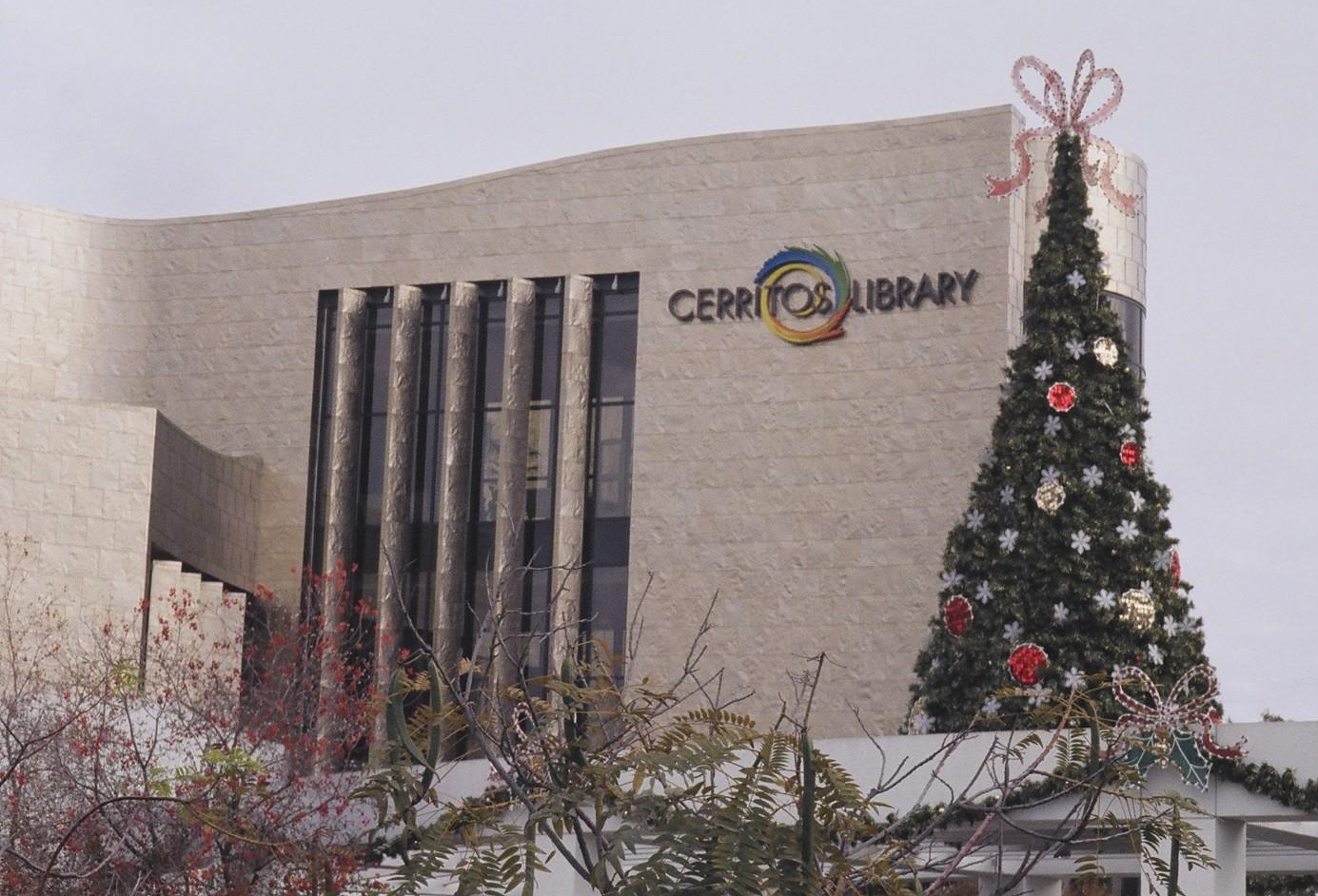
A decorated Christmas tree in front of the Cerritos Library

The Cerritos Library originally opened to the public on September 17, 1973, with a "First Ladies" theme (in recognition of former First Lady Pat Nixon's home in the community). Eight years later, the city made its first renovation to the library for $6.6 million. 21,000 sq ft (2,000 m^{2}) were added for $5.4 million, and the remaining $1.2 million was spent on furniture and equipment.

In the late 1990s, Cerritos recognized the ever-changing innovation in information technology and the internet, and plans for a second renovation were approved. During the reconstruction, all materials were moved off site to temporary trailers in the parking lot of the Cerritos Towne Center for two years. The second renovation and expansion was completed on March 16, 2002.

At the time of its rededication, the newly renamed Cerritos Millennium Library was the first building in North America to be coated in titanium panels. This $40 million library features an elaborate interior design with themed reading rooms in a variety of old world and ultramodern styles. A third floor was added to include several conference rooms and an outdoor terrace.

The Cerritos Library holds a Smithsonian Affiliation. It was awarded the American Library Association/American Institute of Architects "Award of Excellence" in 1989. It was also honored with Reader's Digest's 2004 Best Library Award.

=== Cerritos Sculpture Garden ===
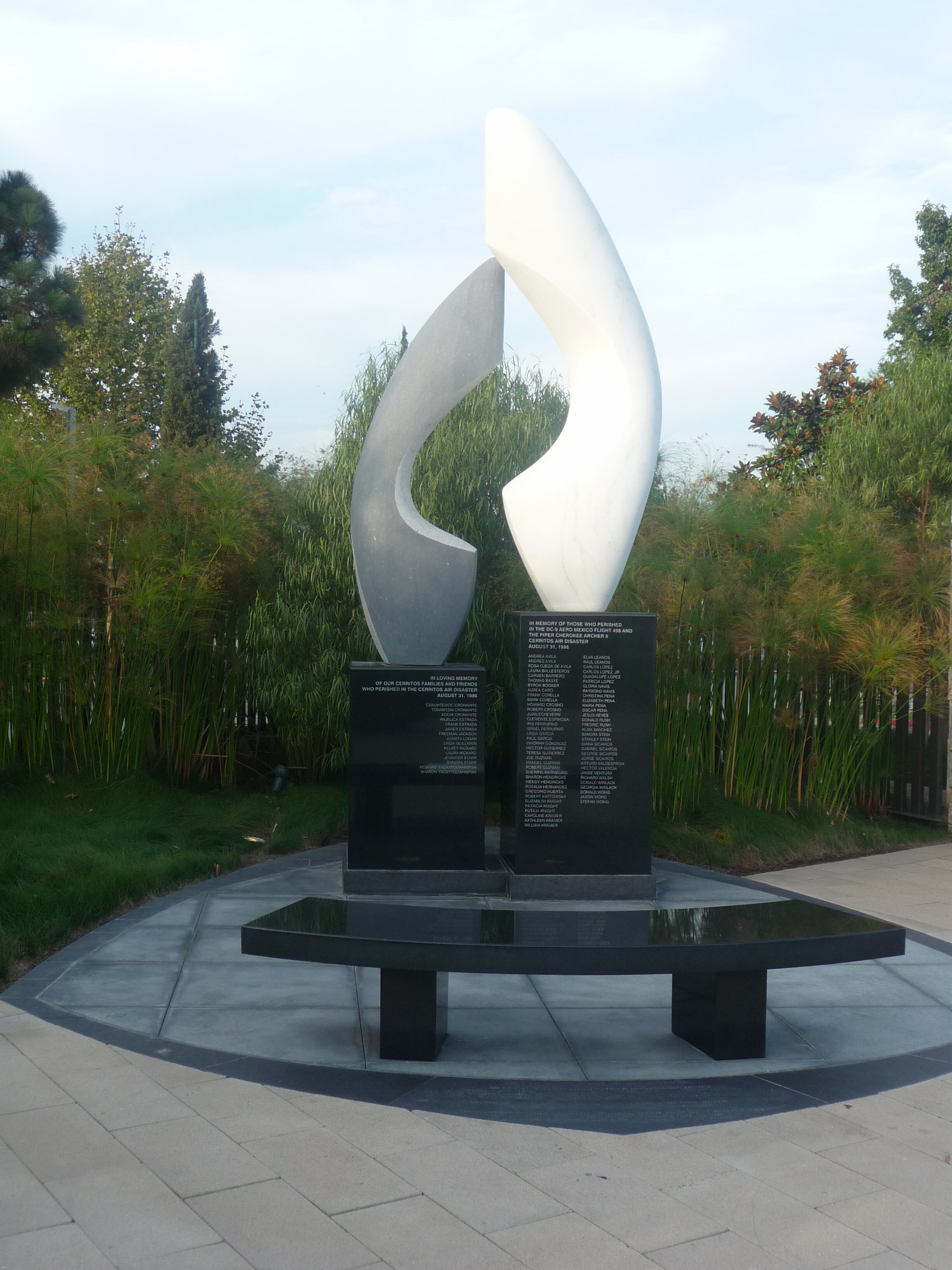
The Cerritos Air Disaster Memorial in the Cerritos Sculpture Garden. The sculpture is a memorial for Aeroméxico Flight 498.

The Cerritos Sculpture Garden was dedicated on March 11, 2006, and included a ribbon cutting ceremony attended by representatives from Cerritos' sister city, Loreto, Baja California Sur, Mexico. It is in the Civic Center and is designed to house approximately 20 sculptures to be phased in over the coming years. At the time of the dedication ceremony, three sculptures were already in place:

- The Air Disaster Memorial, by sculptor Kathleen Caricof, honors by name all the victims of the Aeroméxico Flight 498 disaster on August 31, 1986.
- A replica of the Statue of Freedom that sits atop of the United States Capitol dome.
- Elements Fountain, by artist Jane DeDecker, depicts female embodiments of the four elements allegories (earth, water, wind and fire) over a reflecting pool.

The garden was made to be able to accommodate future sculpture installations in a lush landscape.

== Parks and recreation ==
=== Cerritos Olympic Swim & Fitness Center ===
The Cerritos Olympic Swim & Fitness Center provides year-round, indoor recreational, instructional and competitive swimming and gym.

The Swim Center was used by Olympians for swimming practices during the 1984 Summer Olympics in Los Angeles.

=== Pat Nixon Park ===
The Pat Nixon Park is a recreational park that pays tribute to the late First Lady Pat Nixon on the site of her childhood home, which was destroyed by fire in 1978. The city of Cerritos undertook the project of building a senior center in 1993 to create a state-of-the-art public facility dedicated to its seniors with social events, services, life-enriching programs and clubs.

=== Community and neighborhood parks ===
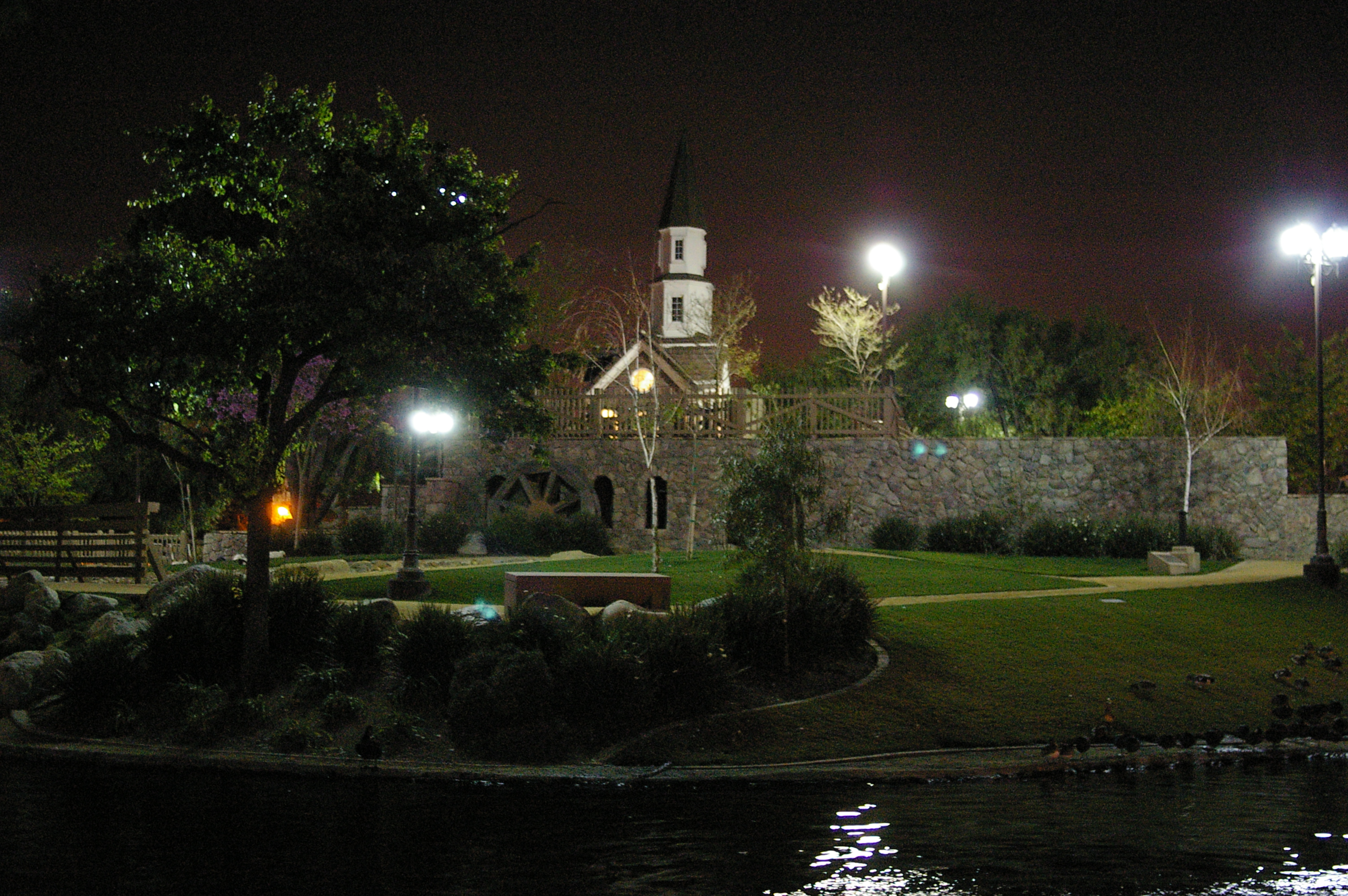
Heritage Park

Heritage Park, a community park in the center of the city, pays tribute to revolutionary America and the founding of the country. It re-opened to the public in 2002 with a refurbished colonial-themed play island and moat.

Liberty Park, another community park in the western end of town, underwent massive renovation and re-opened to the public in February 2005. It features an updated community center, fitness center, rubberized jogging track and children's playground. Camp Liberty, a children's amphitheater within Liberty Park, has also been updated.

Don Knabe Community Regional Park houses the Cerritos Sports Complex, the skate park and outdoor swimming pools. The unique characteristic is an artificial lake complete with sporting fish. Los Angeles County maintains 75% of Regional Park and Cerritos oversees the remaining 25%.

The city also has 18 neighborhood parks near residential tracts, an executive golf course and two community gymnasiums on the Cerritos and Whitney High School (Cerritos, California) campuses.

== Government ==
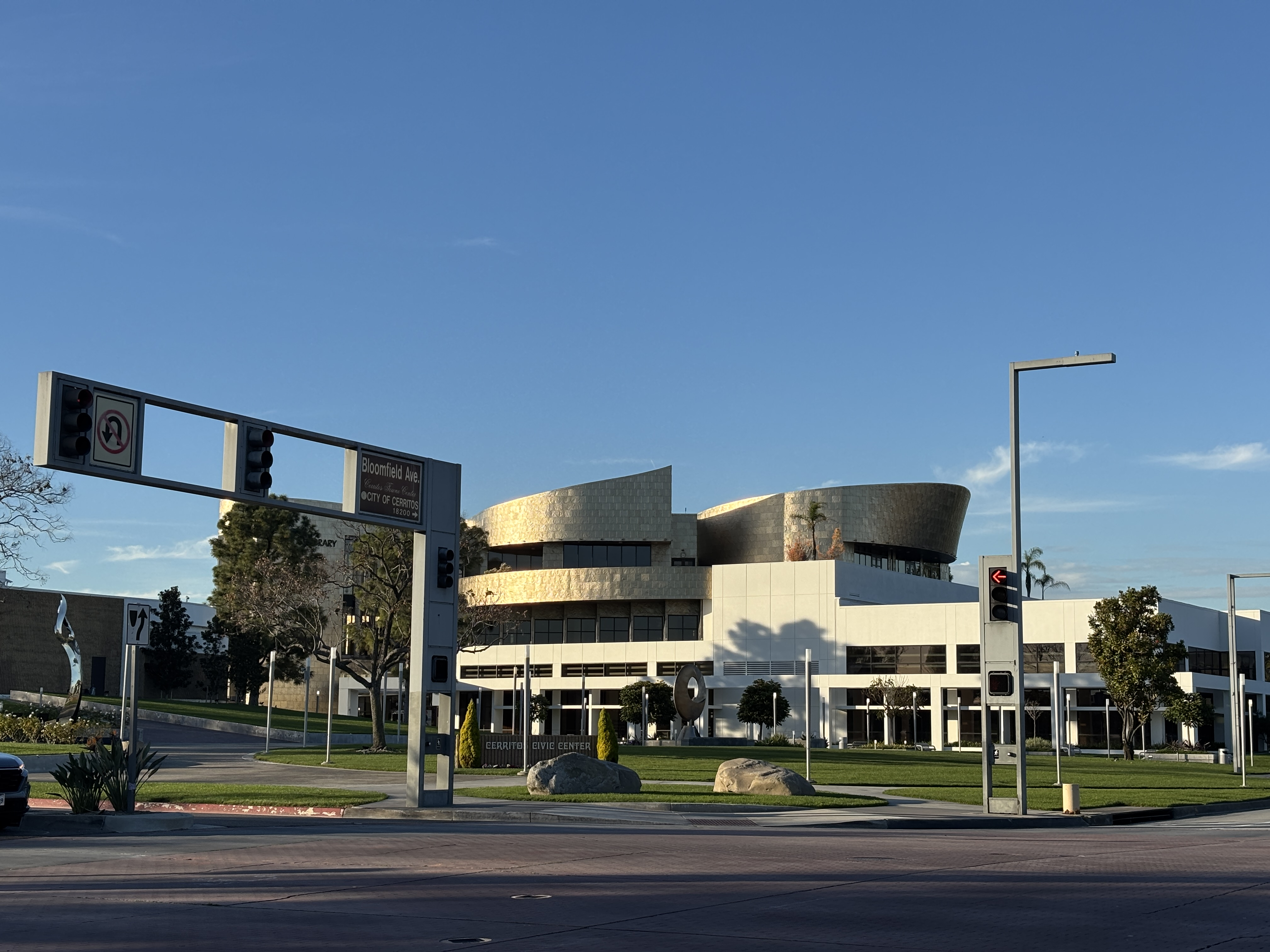
Cerritos Civic Center (2026)

Cerritos operates under a council–manager form of government, established by the charter of the city of Cerritos in 1958. The five-member city council acts as the city's chief policy-making body and as members of the Cerritos Redevelopment Agency.

=== Local government ===
==== City Council ====
The mayor, selected by the council, is its presiding officer and serves a one-year term. In the mayor's absence, the mayor pro tem assumes their responsibilities. City Council elections were held on a Tuesday after the first Monday in April until the 2017 election. Effective with the 2020 California Primary election, the elections will be held on the Tuesday after the first Monday in March of even-numbered years. Council members are elected to a four-year term and at-large. The mayor is Lynda P. Johnson, and the Mayor Pro Tem is Mark Pulido.

==== Emergency services ====
The Cerritos Sheriff's Station/Community Safety Center provides 24-hour safety services to Cerritos residents. Located in the Civic Center, the station houses the city's Community Safety Division and Los Angeles County Sheriff's Department personnel. The station was constructed by a referendum in 1996 and inaugurated in 1997. In 2006, the city council approved the construction of a 5,000-square-foot (500 m^{2}) expansion to the sheriff's station, at a cost of $400,000.

Fire protection is provided by Los Angeles County Fire Department Station 30, the headquarters for Battalion 9, with ambulance transport by Care Ambulance Service.

=== Public services ===
The Los Angeles County Sheriff's Department operates the Cerritos Sheriff's Station and Community Safety Center, which was built into the Cerritos Civic Center. The 28,000 square feet (2,600 m^{2}) facility, built by the city, has a complaint/dispatch area, an 18-bed jail, administrative and detective personnel offices and a community meeting room. The sheriff's department operates the Lakewood Station in Lakewood, serving Cerritos.

The Los Angeles County Department of Health Services operates the Whittier Health Center in Whittier, serving Cerritos.

The United States Postal Service operates the Cerritos post office at 18122 Carmenita Road.

=== State and federal representation ===
In the California State Legislature, Cerritos is in the 36th senatorial district, represented by Republican Tony Strickland, and in the 67th Assembly district, represented by Democrat Sharon Quirk-Silva.

In the United States House of Representatives, Cerritos is in California's 45th congressional district, represented by Democrat Derek Tran.

== Education ==
=== Primary and secondary schools ===
==== Public schools ====
The majority of Cerritos is under the jurisdiction of the ABC Unified School District. A small portion on the west side of the city bounded by Palo Verde Avenue on the west, the San Gabriel River on the east, Artesia Boulevard on the north and South Street on the south is under the jurisdiction of the Bellflower Unified School District.

Children in the ABCUSD portion of Cerritos attend a neighborhood elementary school (kindergarten to 6th grade) before going to a middle school (7th and 8th grade) and then a high school (9th to 12th grade) unless admitted to Whitney High School, which covers 7th to 12th grade. Whitney High School is ranked as the best school in California, ahead of neighboring Oxford Academy, and 27th nationwide according to a 2012 U.S. News & World Report study.

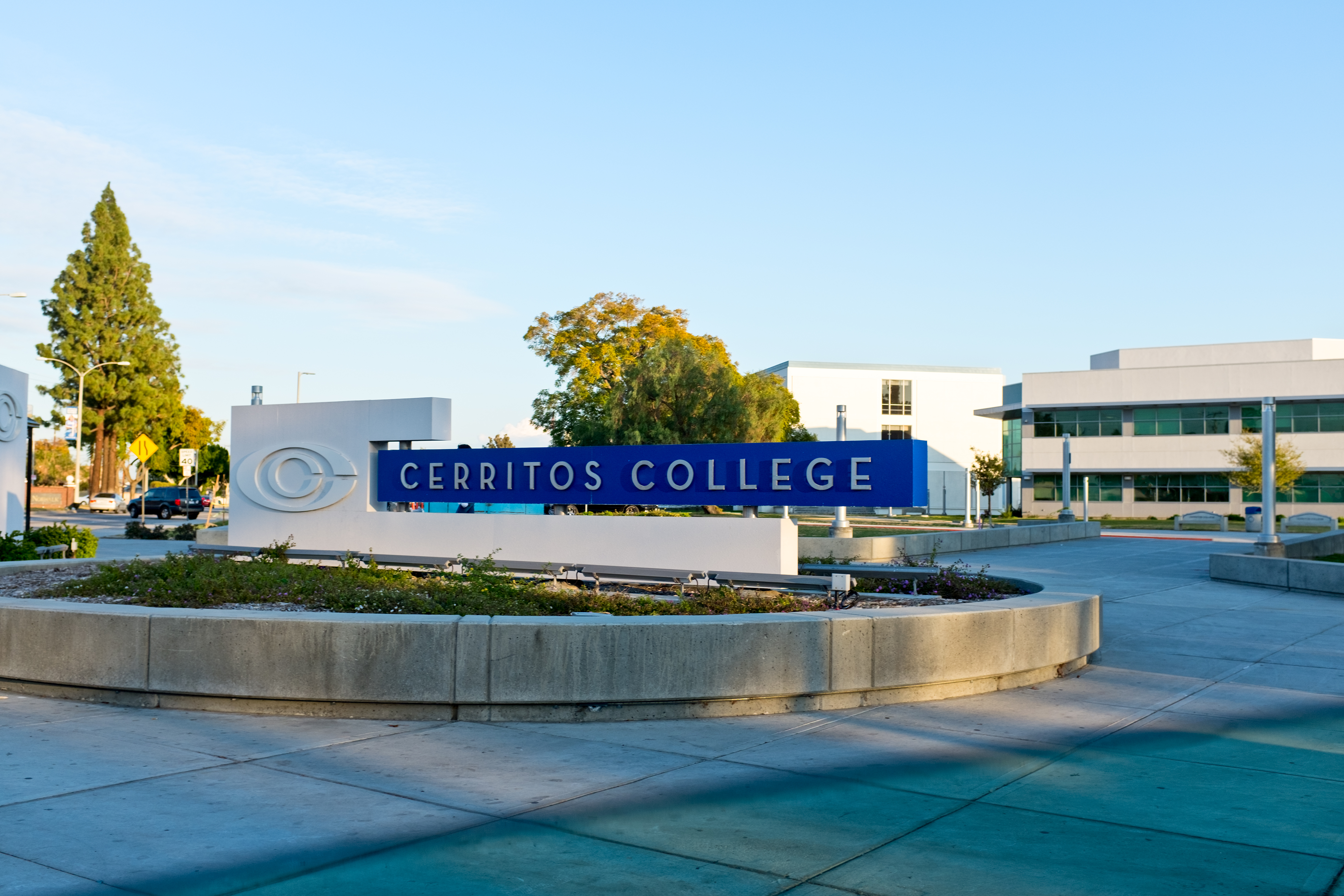
Cerritos College, Cerritos CA

==== Private schools ====
Valley Christian High School is one of the largest private Protestant schools in Los Angeles County.

=== Colleges and universities ===
Cerritos is also serviced by Cerritos College and Fremont College.

=== Education of citizens ===
Eighty-five percent of high school graduates go on to higher education. Ten percent of the total population have an associates degree, 26% have a bachelor's degree and 11% have an advanced degree.

== Transportation ==
The city of Cerritos owned a fleet of federally funded buses known as the Cerritos On Wheels (or COW), which has stops throughout town. The acronym "COW" is a tribute to the city's origins as Dairy Valley, when cows outnumbered residents. The propane-fueled COW also connects to the Long Beach Transit, Orange County Transportation Authority, Norwalk Transit and Los Angeles MTA buses at overlapping stops on the borders of the city. Wi-Fi internet access is also accessible on the buses. The agency was discontinued after May 31, 2026.

The city also provides a Dial-A-Ride service for its disabled and elderly commuters.

Cerritos is directly served by three major California freeways:

- SR 91 (the Artesia Freeway) cuts through the center of the city.
- Interstate 605 (the San Gabriel River Freeway) runs along the west side between the Los Cerritos Center and Auto Square.
- Interstate 5 (the Santa Ana Freeway) grazes Cerritos at the northeast border.

The major thoroughfares in Cerritos are Alondra Boulevard, Artesia Boulevard, Bloomfield Avenue, Carmenita Road, Del Amo Boulevard, Norwalk Boulevard, Pioneer Boulevard, Shoemaker Avenue, South Street, Studebaker Road and Valley View Avenue.

The nearby Port of Los Angeles and Port of Long Beach are major ports of entry from the Pacific Ocean for importing and exporting goods.

Airports that serve Cerritos include Los Angeles International Airport (LAX), John Wayne Airport in Orange County, Bob Hope Airport in Burbank, Ontario International Airport and the Long Beach Municipal Airport. Cranford Airport, a small general-aviation airport, was built around 1946 and consisted of two 2,300-foot runways, one oriented north–south & the other northeast–southwest. Each runway had a parallel taxiway, and a ramp along the south side of the field had two building hangars. The former airport site is on the northwest corner of the intersection of South Street & Carmenita Road. Cranford Airport closed at some point between 1953 and 1954.

== Notable people ==
- Troy Aikman, American football quarterback for the Dallas Cowboys and member of the Pro Football Hall of Fame.
- Chad Allen, actor.
- Marcelo Balboa, MLS Colorado Rapids and US national soccer team member.
- Bret Barberie, former second baseman for the Florida Marlins, once married to TV news star Jillian Barberie.
- Johnny Chan, professional poker player.
- Morris Chestnut, actor.
- Robby Gordon, a NASCAR Sprint Cup driver, was born and raised in Cerritos. He lives in Orange, California.
- Rickey Cradle, MLB baseball player for the Seattle Mariners.
- Ben Howland, UCLA men's basketball head coach.
- Jimmy Kim, taekwondo practitioner and instructor who won a gold medal in the heavyweight division at the 1988 Summer Olympics in Seoul, South Korea.
- Eddie Lewis, professional soccer player.
- Roger Lodge, host of the reality show Blind Date and radio sports announcer.
- Shane Mack, former MLB baseball player.
- Justin H. Min, actor.
- Nakoula Basseley Nakoula, filmmaker of Innocence of Muslims.
- Pat Nixon, First Lady and wife of President Richard Nixon. Her family owned a truck farm formerly in Artesia, but now in Cerritos. Pat Nixon Park is on the site of her childhood home.
- Max Park, professional speedcuber
- Lela Rochon, actress.
- Jorge Salcedo, NCAA soccer coach at UCLA. and L.A. Galaxy team member.
- Jae Park, former lead guitarist and vocalist of Korean rock band DAY6; now a solo artist who goes by eaJ.
- Kirsten Vangsness, actress and writer.
- Jim Zorn, former NFL coach and quarterback.

== In popular culture ==
According to the IMDb, the following productions have either been partially or entirely filmed in Cerritos:

- Almost There! (TV series, 1988)
- I'm Ready (music video, 2020)
- Wayne's World (1992)
- Imminent Contact (1992)
- Until Tomorrow Comes (1992)
- McAllister Affair (TV series, 1992)
- Coneheads (1993)
- She's All That (1999)
- The Flip Side (2001)
- Anokha (2004)
- A Modest Proposal (2006)
- Boston Legal (2006)
- Illegal (2007)
- Eli's Liquor Store (2007)
- The First Time (2007)
- Thunder (music video, 2008)
- Dexter (2013)
- Silicon Valley (HBO series 2014-2019)
- Griselda (Netflix series, 2024)

The main setting of Star Trek: Lower Decks, the California-class starship USS Cerritos, is named for the city.

In the Apple TV+ show Mythic Quest, the character David Brittlesbee lives in and commutes to Los Angeles from Cerritos in Season 3

In the 2026 Steven Spielberg science fiction film Disclosure Day, a central character, Dr. Margaret Fairchild (played by Emily Blunt), is explicitly stated to have been born in Cerritos.

== Sister cities ==
- Itapetinga, Bahia, Brazil (1964)
- Banquiao, New Taipei City, Taiwan (1986)
- Loreto, Baja California Sur, Mexico (1999)
- San Carlos, Pangasinan, Philippines (2025)
