= ABC Unified School District =

School district in California, United States

Location
- Cerritos, California Southeastern Los Angeles County

District information
- Type: Public
- Grades: K-12 and Adult School
- Established: 1965
- Superintendent: Dr. Gina Zietlow
- Schools: 30

Other information
- Website: www.abcusd.k12.ca.us

The ABC Unified School District is a school district that is based in Cerritos, California, United States.

ABCUSD serves the cities of Artesia, most of Cerritos, Hawaiian Gardens, the portion of Lakewood east of the San Gabriel River, as well as tiny portions of Long Beach, Norwalk, La Mirada, and Santa Fe Springs

"ABC" stands for Artesia (founded in 1875), Bloomfield (founded in 1885), and Carmenita (founded in 1902), three districts which were unified in 1965.

== List of schools ==
=== Adult schools ===
ABC Adult School is a public local adult school, established by the ABC Unified School District and headquartered in Cerritos, California.

=== Continuation schools ===
- Tracy High Continuation School (Cerritos)

=== 7-12 schools ===
- Whitney High School (Cerritos)

=== High schools ===
- Artesia High School (Lakewood)
- Cerritos High School (Cerritos)
- Gahr High School (Cerritos)

=== Middle schools ===
- Carmenita Middle School (Cerritos)
- Fedde Academy (Hawaiian Gardens)
- Haskell Stem Academy (Cerritos)
- Ross Academy of Creative and Media Arts (Artesia)
- Tetzlaff Academy (Cerritos)

=== Elementary schools ===
- Bloomfield Elementary School (Hawaiian Gardens) (closed in the 1980s)
- Bragg Elementary School (Cerritos)
- Burbank Elementary School (Artesia)
- Cabrillo Lane Elementary School (Cerritos) (Closed)
- Carver Academy (Cerritos)
- Cerritos Elementary School (Cerritos)
- Elliott Elementary School (Artesia)
- Furgeson Elementary School (Hawaiian Gardens)
- Gonsalves Elementary School (Cerritos)
- Hawaiian Elementary School (Hawaiian Gardens)
- Kennedy STEM Academy (Artesia)
- Leal Elementary School (Cerritos)
- Melbourne Elementary School (Lakewood)
- Niemes Elementary School (Artesia)
- Nixon Academy (Cerritos)
- Palms Accelerated Learning Academy (Lakewood)
- Stowers Elementary School (Cerritos)
- Willow Elementary School (Lakewood)
- Wittmann Elementary School (Cerritos)

=== Nixon Elementary ===
Patricia Nixon Elementary School
- Aerial view of Nixon's campus

Location
- 19600 Jacob Avenue; Cerritos, California; 33.852400°N 118.075980°W

Information
- School type: Public elementary
- Founded: 1973
- School district: ABC Unified School District
- Principal: Dr. Tracy
- Grades: K-6
- Enrollment: 670
- Mascot: Jaguar

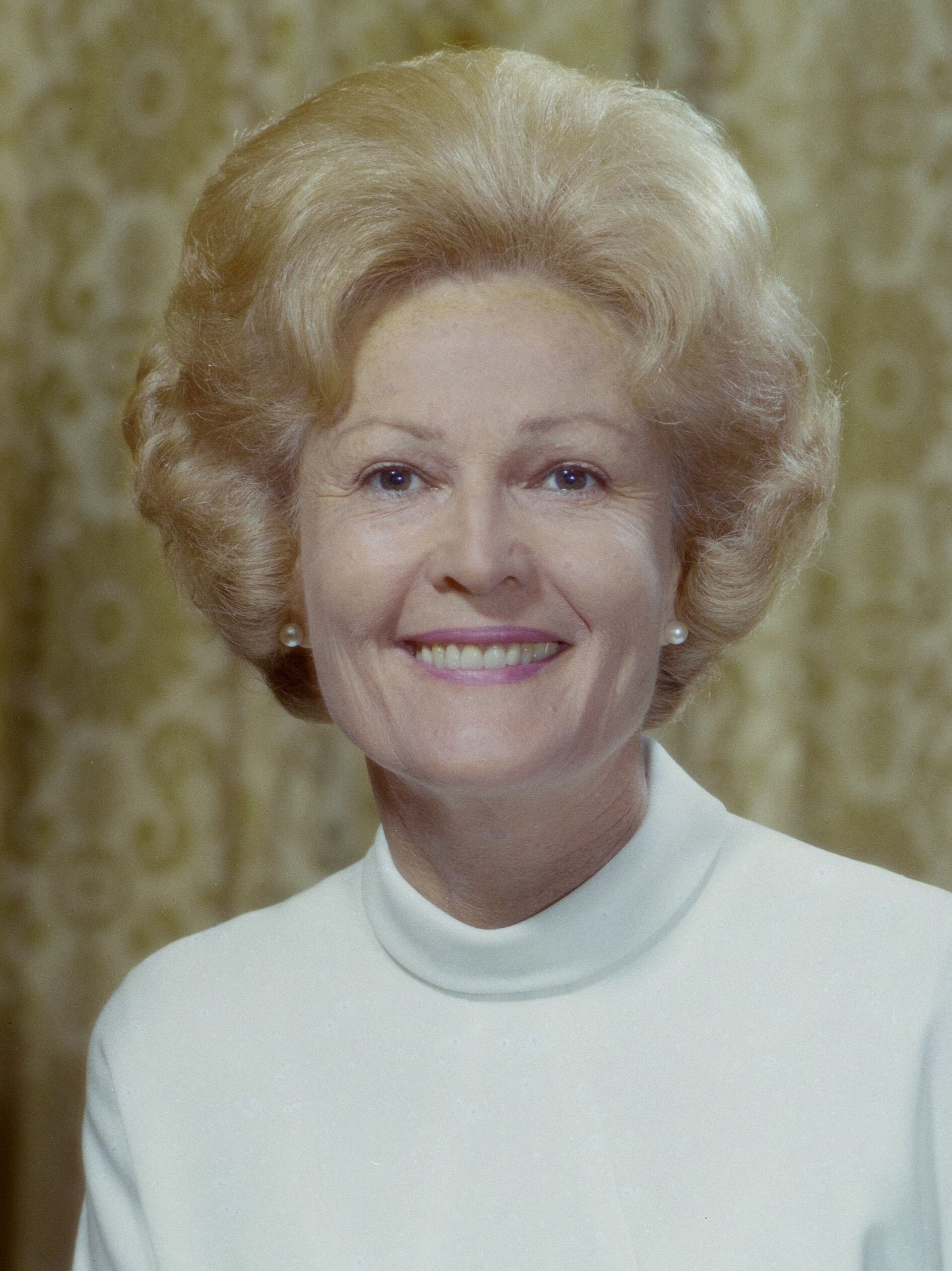
The late former First Lady Pat Nixon, for whom the institution is named.

The Patricia Nixon Elementary School is located in Cerritos. It was built in 1973 and has grades kindergarten through sixth. The school is named after the late First Lady of the United States Pat Nixon. Patricia Nixon Elementary School was recognized as a California Distinguished School in 2004 and 2008.

== Board of education ==
ABC Unified School District's Board of Education members are elected by geographical district, to a four-year term. The elections were held on the first Tuesday after the first Monday in November of odd-numbered years until the 2017 election. Effective with the November 2020 US General election, elections are held in even-numbered years.

== Blagden lawsuit ==
In 2010, Eileen Blagden, the principal of Stowers Elementary School, filed a whistleblower lawsuit against ABC Unified School District alleging retaliation for reporting alleged death threats made by a teacher.

According to court documents, the incident involved Kevin Michael Kirby, a kindergarten teacher who had been transferred to Stowers Elementary following a suspension from his previous position. Blagden alleged that in January 2010, after Kirby was involved in a motorcycle accident and arrived at school in a distressed state, he told her he wanted to "hire a hitman" to kill two fellow kindergarten teachers.

Blagden claimed that when she reported the incident to the district's Human Resources Department, she was instructed not to notify law enforcement or the threatened teachers. Despite these instructions, Blagden contacted the Los Angeles County Sheriff's Department over the weekend and informed the two teachers who had allegedly been threatened.

Following her report to authorities, Blagden was placed on paid administrative leave and subsequently demoted to a classroom teaching position in June 2010. The district maintained that her demotion was due to performance issues rather than retaliation for whistleblowing.

In June 2012, Los Angeles Superior Court Judge Joanne O'Donnell denied the school district's motion for summary judgment, finding that there was evidence another school employee knew of the threats and did not report them, which "weakens the credibility of defendant's position." The case was scheduled for trial in October 2012.

In November 2012, the parties reached a settlement subject to approval by the ABC Unified School District Board of Education. The case was formally dismissed on November 19, 2012. The terms of the settlement were not disclosed.

The teacher involved, Kevin Michael Kirby, told sheriff's investigators he made the "hitman" comment "in jest" and said he "wouldn't hurt a fly." District officials confirmed that Kirby was no longer working for ABC Unified, though they did not specify when or under what circumstances he left.
