= Cerritos Library =

Coordinates: 33.867001°N 118.064797°W

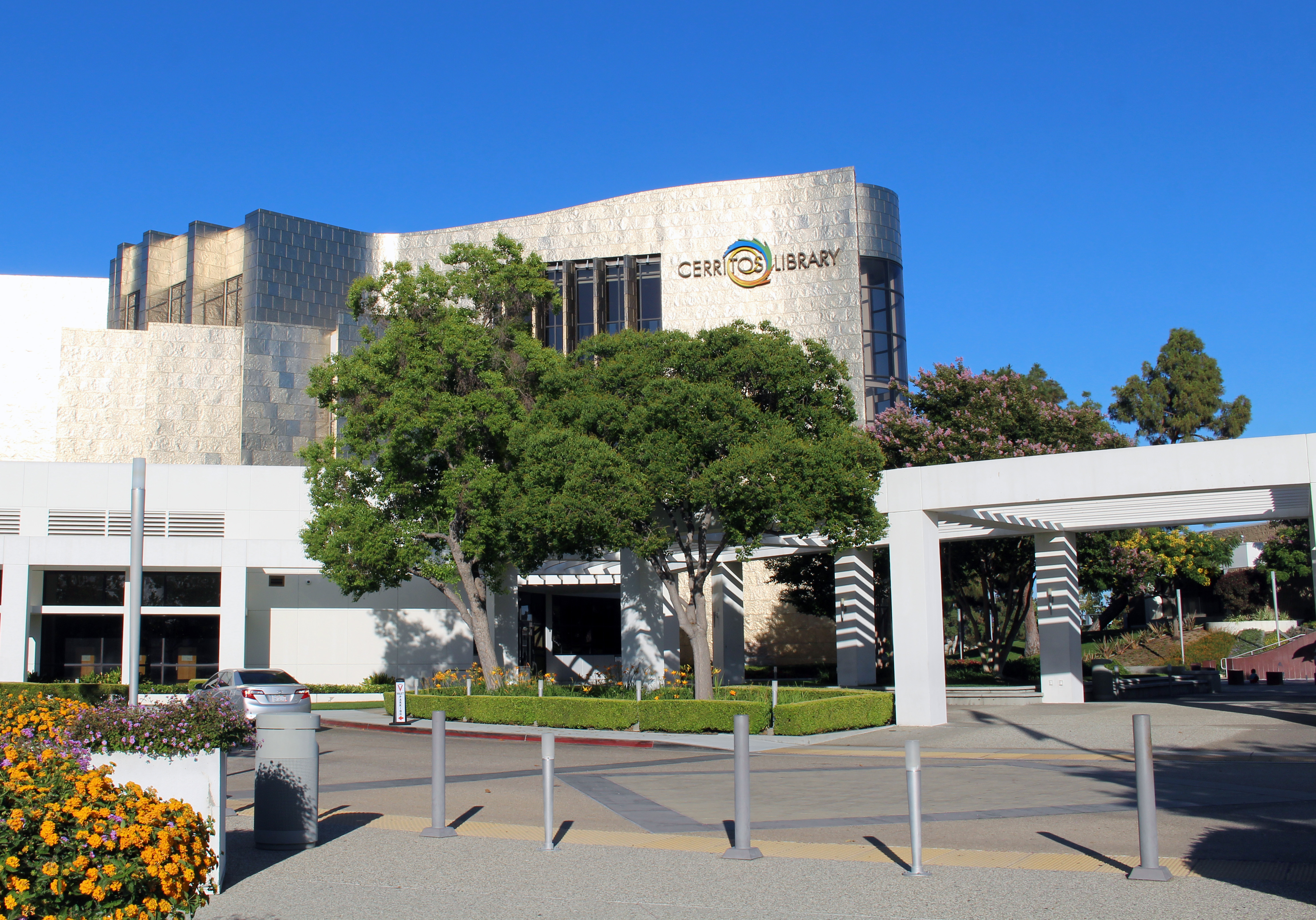
- Cerritos Library as seen when looking east from the Civic Center garage
- Interactive map of the Cerritos Library area
- Alternative names: Cerritos Millennium Library; Cerritos Public Library; New Cerritos Library

General information
- Type: Public library
- Location: Cerritos, California, 18025 Bloomfield Ave.
- Groundbreaking: June 17, 1972
- Opened: September 17, 1973 (Original); March 16, 2002 (expansion)
- Cost: $6.6 million
- Owner: City of Cerritos

Technical details
- Floor count: 3
- Floor area: 82,500 sq ft (7,660 m^{2})
- Lifts/elevators: 2

Other information
- Parking: On-site surface lot, Underground garage

Website
- cerritoslibrary.gov

The Cerritos Library is the civic library for the City of Cerritos, California, United States. It features an exterior clad with titanium panels. It has been an affiliate with the Smithsonian Institution since 2000.

== History ==
The Cerritos Library at the time was 18,000 square feet (1,700 m^{2}) and housed 45,000 books. In addition, the library also had a children's area, theater and law library. Three years later, Cerritos joined the Metropolitan Cooperative Library System.

In 1986, the city earmarked $6.6 million to remodel the building and added another 21,000 square feet (2,000 m^{2}) to the area.

In 2002 the Library was expanded once again, totaling 82,500-square-feet. Which included a new 15,000 gallon aquarium and a Titanium clad exterior.

== Features ==
There is a children's area, and a teen area. On the third floor is a banquet hall that can host events.

== Awards and recognition ==
- Best Public Library in 2003 "Best of L.A." issue of Los Angeles
- Best Public Library in 2004 by Reader's Digest
- American Library Association/American Institute of Architects "Award of Excellence"
- Thea Award 2003
