= PAVA =

Pava or PAVA may refer to:

- Pāvā (now Padrauna), a city in ancient India, which Buddha visited during his last journey
- Pava (Puerto Rico), a hat related to the Jibaro of Puerto Rico
- Pava, Iran, a village in Razavi Khorasan Province, Iran
- Pacific American Volunteer Association, non-profit for improving environment and community
- Pawapuri (or Pava), a holy site for Jains in Bihar, India, where Mahavira attained Nirvana
- Pelargonic acid vanillylamide, or Nonivamide, a capsaicinoid
  - PAVA spray, similar to pepper spray
- Chevak Airport (ICAO location indicator: PAVA), Alaska, United States
- Iranian Security Police (PAVA), of Iran
- Pool adjacent violators algorithm, an algorithm for one-dimensional isotonic regression

== See also ==
- Pawa (disambiguation)
- La Pava, Olá District, Coclé Province, Panama
- Las Pavas, a Colombian emerald mining area
