= Rose Parade marching bands =

Marching bands for the Rose Parade

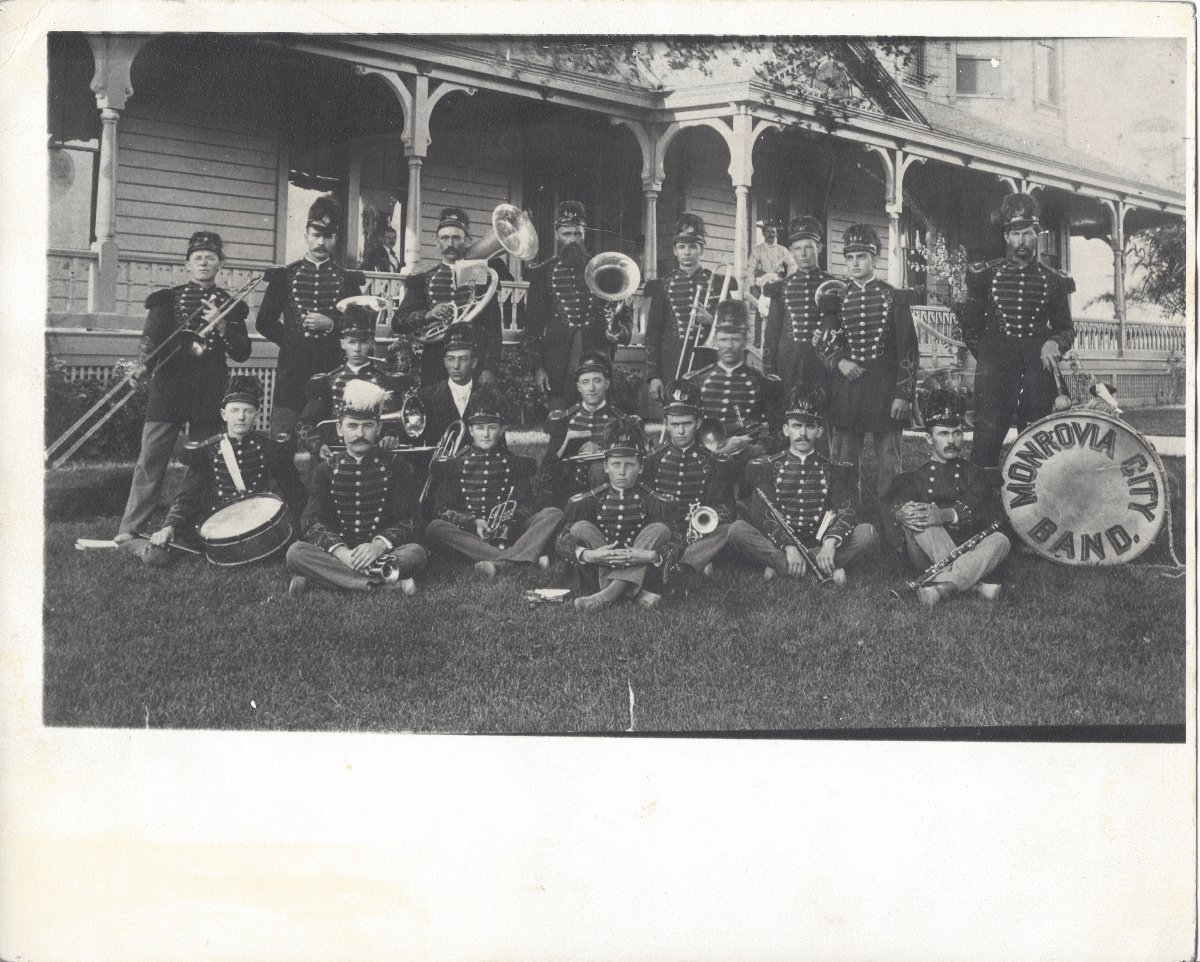
Monrovia City Band (March 5, 1890) was the first band to play in the parade in 1891.

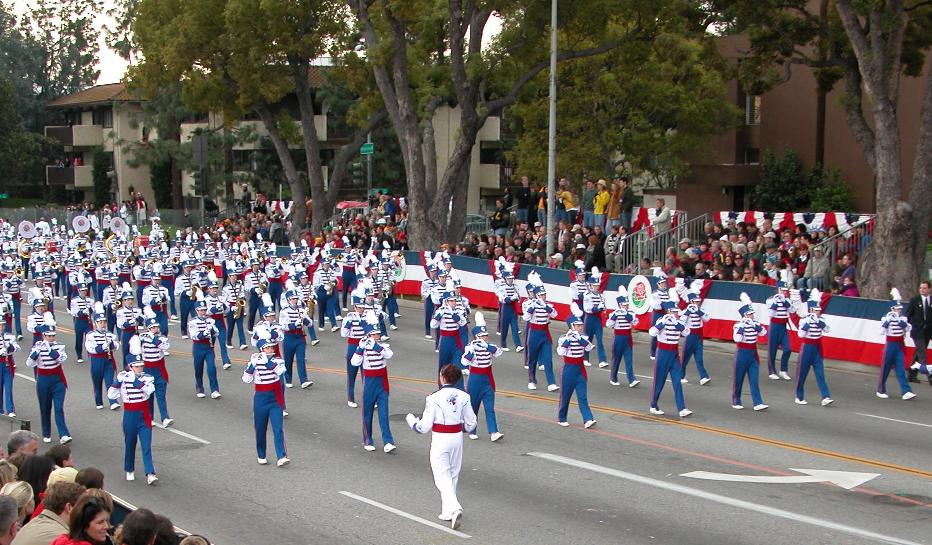
Londonderry High School Marching Lancer Band, from New Hampshire during the 2004 parade

For the Tournament of Roses Parade, top marching bands from all over the world are invited. Many of the nation's top high school marching bands participate, along with college and organizational marching bands. Prior to the parade, most of the bands will participate in one of three "Bandfest" shows at Pasadena City College and at other Southern California venues.

The bands participating in the parade have also developed traditions. For example, Pasadena City College's Lancer Marching Band always marches in the Rose Parade, along with high school band and color guard students from all over Southern California, who are selected by audition the previous autumn. The Tournament of Roses Honor Band is a coveted position, and those selected are among the best student musicians in California. Nine of the high school trumpet players, selected by performance on their auditions, and the best snare drummer, are selected as the Herald Trumpets, who march directly before the Rose Queen's float and play fanfares.

University marching bands from the two schools participating in the Rose Bowl Game, along with their spirit squads, are invited to march in the parade. They typically accompany the floats that represent the conferences.

In 1891, the Monrovia City Band was the first musical group to perform in the Rose Parade. T.M. Hotchkiss, Historical Section of the Friends of the Monrovia Library wrote in 1986 that "Albert E. Cronenwett organized and led the Monrovia City Band. It went wherever music was needed. On New Year's Day in 1891 it was the first musical organization to march in the Tournament of Roses Parade in Pasadena. "Cronnie's Band" will long be remembered."

Bands that have a long-standing arrangement to be in the parade include:

- The Pasadena City College Tournament of Roses Honor Band
- The Los Angeles Unified School District All District High School Honor Band
- The Salvation Army marching band (100th appearance in 2019)
- The United States Marine Corps West Coast Composite Band

In 1965, the Mississippi Valley State College (Mississippi Valley State University) Marching Band was the first HBCU marching band to be invited to participate in the Rose Parade. They were also the first HBCU band to be invited back a second time to participate in the parade.

In 1998, the Washington Township High School Minutemen Marching Band from Sewell, New Jersey, became the first band in the history of the Rose Parade to decorate its entire ranks with live flowers, in keeping with the practice of decorating the parade floats. Designed by Todd Marcocci and Francesco Protasi, this unique concept and design approach received support from media around the world. Since then, several bands have followed suit.

== Bandfest ==
Also, most of the bands participate in Bandfest, which is sponsored by Remo, where bands perform their field shows at Pasadena City College's Mack and Jackie Robinson Stadium over two days. Bandfest consists of three shows (one on the first day and two on the second day). A percussion group from Remo leads a drum circle with the audience, who have received complimentary Remo drumheads and sticks prior to the event. The Pasadena City College Honor Band and Herald Trumpets perform first, followed by other bands. All bands are invited to perform at Bandfest, but all do not necessarily perform (typically the university bands involved in the Rose Bowl Game). The band members are treated to lunch from In-N-Out Burger with on-site kitchen-trailers or at the Rose Bowl. The bands also take their group picture in front of the Rose Bowl stadium south entrance.

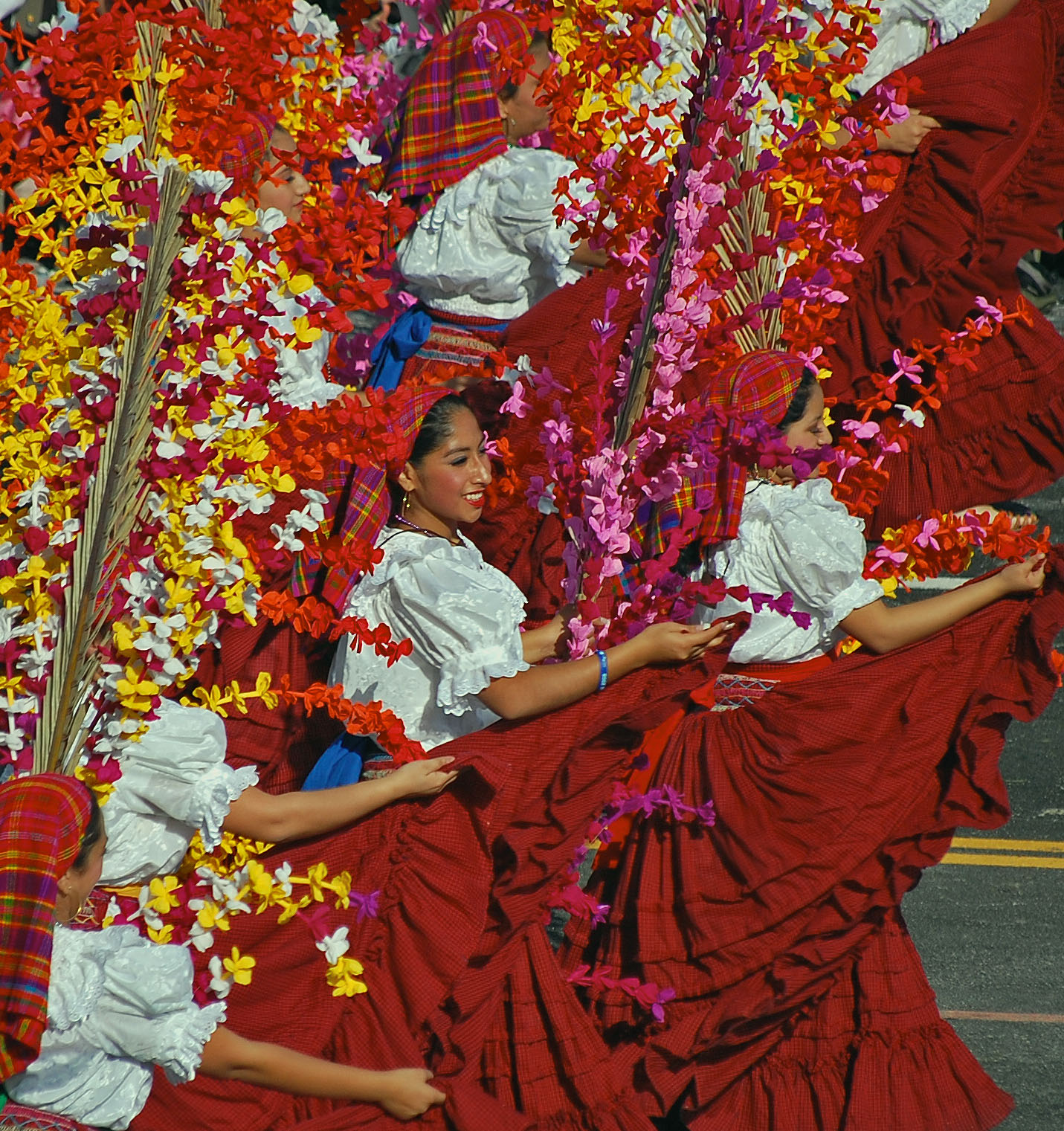
Nuestros Angeles de El Salvador dancers from San Salvador, El Salvador The dancers followed the marching band

== List of bands ==
=== 1930 ===
- American Legion Massed Drum and Bugle Corps of 200
- Benevolent and Protective Order of Elks Band
- Burbank Municipal Band
- Caliente Band
- California Institute of Technology Band
- Franklin High School Marching Band
- Huntington Park High School Band
- John Marshall Junior High School Marching Band
- Long Beach Municipal Band
- Pasadena Bag Pipe Band
- Pasadena G.A.R. Fife and Drum Corps
- Pasadena Sciots Band
- Redondo Beach Girls' Band
- Roberts' Golden State Band
- Salvation Army Band
- Santa Monica Municipal Band
- Taft High School Girls' Band
- Tournament of Roses Honor Band (Pasadena City College)
- Union Pacific Band
- University of Southern California Trojan Marching Band, Los Angeles, California (Rose Bowl participant)
- Van Nuys-Owensmouth High School Band

=== 1931 ===
- Benevolent and Protective Order of Elks Band
- Burbank Municipal Band
- California Institute of Technology Band
- Franklin Regional High School Marching Band
- Huntington Park High School Band
- Inglewood Boys' Band Marching Band
- Jinnistan Grotto Bag Pipe Band
- Long Beach Municipal Band
- Pasadena Civic Orchestra
- Pasadena Bag Pipe Band
- Pasadena G.A.R. Fife and Drum Corps
- Pasadena Junior College Girls' Band
- Pasadena Sciots Band
- Redondo Beach Girls' Band
- Roberts' Golden State Band
- San Fernando High School Marching Band
- St. Elizabeth School Band
- Tournament of Roses Honor Band (Pasadena City College)
- Union Pacific Band
- Ventura High School Band
- Washington Junior High School Band

=== 1932 ===
- Antelope Valley Band
- Bakersfield High School Marching Band
- Burbank Municipal Band
- Inglewood Boys' Band Marching Band
- Jinnistan Grotto Bag Pipe Band
- John Muir High School Marching Band
- Long Beach Municipal Band
- Massed Color and Drum Corps
- Pasadena Bag Pipe Band
- Pasadena Elks' Band
- Pasadena G.A.R. Fife and Drum Corps
- Pasadena Junior College Band
- Pasadena Junior College Girls' Band
- Pasadena Sciots Band
- Roberts' Golden State Band
- Salvation Army Band
- San Fernando High School Marching Band
- Southern California Girls' band
- St. Elizabeth Boy's Band
- Tournament of Roses Honor Band (Pasadena City College)
- Tulane University Marching Band
- Union Pacific Band
- University of Southern California Trojan Marching Band, Los Angeles, California (Rose Bowl participant)
- Van Nuys-Canoga High School Marching Band
- Whittier Municipal Band

=== 1933 ===
- Inglewood Boys' Band Marching Band
- Long Beach Municipal Band
- McKinley Junior High School Marching Band
- Pasadena Junior College Girls' Band
- Pasadena Sciots Band
- Santa Ana American Legion Band
- Santa Barbara State College Band
- Santa Monica Municipal Band
- Southern California Girls' band
- Tournament of Roses Honor Band (Pasadena City College)
- University of Pittsburgh Marching Band
- University of Southern California Trojan Marching Band, Los Angeles, California (Rose Bowl participant)

=== 1934 ===
- Bakersfield Junior College and High School Band
- Columbia University Marching Band
- Eliot Junior High School Marching Band
- Greater San Diego Band
- Harold Williams Roberts Mounted Band
- Inglewood Boys' Band Marching Band
- Leland Stanford Junior University Marching Band
- Lompoc Municipal Band
- Long Beach Municipal Band
- Los Angeles Harbor Band
- North Hollywood Band
- Orange County Band
- Roberts' Golden State Band
- Safeway Employees Association Band
- Salvation Army Band
- Santa Barbara State College Band
- Santa Monica Band
- Scotch Kiltie band
- South Gate Boys Band
- South Pasadena High School Marching Band
- Southern California Girls' band
- Tournament of Roses Honor Band (Pasadena City College)
- Ventura Junior College Marching Band

=== 1935 ===
- Antelope Valley Band
- Bakersfield Junior College and High School Band
- Burbank High School Marching Band
- Eliot Junior High School Marching Band
- Greater San Diego Boys' Band
- John Muir High School Marching Band
- Leland Stanford Junior University Marching Band
- Long Beach Municipal Band
- Maricopa High School Marching Band
- Orange County Band
- Roberts' Golden State Band
- Safeway Employees Association Band
- Salvation Army Band
- Santa Barbara State College Band
- South Pasadena High School Marching Band
- Tournament of Roses Honor Band (Pasadena City College)
- University of Alabama Marching Band
- Ventura Junior College Marching Band
- Victor McLaglen's Light Horse Band

=== 1936 ===
- Antelope Valley Band
- Arizona State Teachers College band
- Bonham Brothers San Diego Boys' Band
- Burbank City School Band
- Fresno State College Band
- Glendale Oaks Band
- Inglewood Boys' Band Marching Band
- John Marshall Junior High School Marching Band
- John T. Boudreau Symphonic Band
- Leland Stanford Junior University Marching Band
- Lompoc Municipal Band
- Long Beach Municipal Band
- Pomona Junior College and High School Marching Band
- Roberts' Golden State Band
- Safeway Employees Association Band
- Salvation Army Band
- San Fernando High School Marching Band
- South Gate Boys Band
- South Pasadena High School Marching Band
- Tournament of Roses Honor Band (Pasadena City College)
- University of California at Los Angeles Bruin Marching Band
- Victor McLaglen's Light Horse Band

=== 1937 ===
- Arizona State Teachers College band
- Burbank High School Marching Band
- Elks Symphonic Band
- John T. Boudreau Symphonic Band
- Long Beach Municipal Band
- McKinley Junior High School Marching Band
- Musician's Post Band
- Safeway Employees Association Band
- Salvation Army Band
- San Fernando High School Marching Band
- South Gate Boys and Girls Band
- Tournament of Roses Honor Band (Pasadena City College)
- University of California at Los Angeles Bruin Marching Band
- Victor McLaglen's Light Horse Band
- Vina MacAdams All-Girl Pipe Band

=== 1938 ===
- Burbank High School Marching Band
- Eliot Junior High School Marching Band
- Elk's Symphonic Band
- John Muir High School Marching Band
- John T. Boudreau Symphonic Band
- Long Beach Polytechnic High School Marching Band
- Loyola University Marching Band
- Musician's Post Band
- Salvation Army Band
- San Fernando High School Marching Band
- South Pasadena High School Marching Band
- Tournament of Roses Honor Band (Pasadena City College)
- University of California at Los Angeles Bruin Marching Band
- University of California Berkeley Marching Band
- World War Veterans Pipe Band

=== 1939 ===
- 16th Canadian Scottish Bagpipe Band
- Burbank High School Marching Band
- Charles Post Band
- Elk's Symphonic Band
- John Marshall Junior High School Marching Band
- John T. Boudreau Symphonic Band
- Long Beach Polytechnic High School Marching Band
- Musician's Post Band
- Pomona Junior College Marching Band
- Salvation Army Band
- San Fernando High School Marching Band
- Santa Barbara State College Band
- South Pasadena High School Marching Band
- Tournament of Roses Honor Band (Pasadena City College)
- University of California at Los Angeles Bruin Marching Band
- University of Southern California Trojan Marching Band, Los Angeles, California (Rose Bowl participant)
- Unknown Band (Prologue)
- Ventura Junior College Marching Band

=== 1940 ===
- Babich Symphonic Band
- Bonham Brothers Boys' Band
- Bourdreau Symphonic Band
- Burbank High School Marching Band
- Elks Symphonic Band
- Glendale Elks Club Band
- Long Beach Junior College Band
- Lynwood Junior High School Band
- McKinley Junior High School Marching Band
- Orange Union High School Band
- Pasadena Junior College Music Alumni
- Post Symphonic Band
- Salvation Army Band
- San Gabriel Police Boys' Band
- Sheriff Boy's Band
- Tournament of Roses Honor Band (Pasadena City College)
- University of California at Los Angeles Bruin Marching Band
- University of Southern California Trojan Marching Band, Los Angeles, California (Rose Bowl participant)

=== 1941 ===
- Bonham Brothers Boys' Band
- Chaffey High School and Junior College Band
- Compton Junior College Band
- Eliot Junior High School Marching Band
- Elks' Symphonic Band
- Golden West Symphonic Band
- John T. Boudreau Symphonic Band
- Leland Stanford Junior University Marching Band
- Long Beach Junior College Band
- Los Angeles District No. 6 Band
- Post Symphonic Band
- Salvation Army Band
- San Gabriel Police Boys' Band
- South Pasadena-San Marino High School Band
- Southwest Boys' and Girls' Band
- Tournament of Roses Honor Band (Pasadena City College)
- University of Nebraska Marching Band
- Ventura Junior College Marching Band

=== 1942 ===
No parade due to restrictions on West Coast crowds from the start of World War II

=== 1943 ===
No parade due to restrictions on West Coast crowds from the start of World War II

=== 1946 ===
- Bonham Brothers Boys' Band
- Boudreau's Symphonic Band
- Compton Junior College Marching Band
- Elks Symphonic Band
- Huntington Park City Junior Band
- Lynwood Junior High School Band
- Pomona Junior College Marching Band
- Salvation Army Band
- San Marino High School Band
- Santa Barbara High School Marching Band
- Sherman Institute Indian Band
- The Post Band
- Tournament of Roses Honor Band (Pasadena City College)
- University of Southern California Trojan Marching Band, Los Angeles, California (Rose Bowl participant)
- Wilkin's Hollywood Swing Band
- Woodrow Wilson High School Marching Band

=== 1947 ===
- Bonham Brothers Boys' Band
- Camas High School Band
- Compton College Band
- Huntington Park Band
- Long Beach All-Girls Band
- Muir Junior College Band
- Portland-Roosevelt High School Band
- Salvation Army Band
- Santa Barbara High School Marching Band
- Santa Monica High School Band
- South Pasadena-San Marino High School Band
- Tournament of Roses Honor Band (Pasadena City College)
- Union Band
- University of California at Los Angeles Bruin Marching Band (Rose Bowl Participant)
- Washington Junior High School Band

=== 1948 ===
- Alhambra Marching Band
- Bonham Brothers Boys' Band
- Butte High School Marching Band
- Glendale Band
- Huntington Park Band
- John Muir College Band
- Las Vegas Band
- Long Beach All Girls Band
- Pasadena Junior High Schools Band
- Salvation Army Band
- Santa Monica Band
- Sheriff Boy's Band
- South Pasadena Band
- Tournament of Roses Honor Band (Pasadena City College)
- Union Band
- University of Michigan Marching Band
- University of Southern California Trojan Marching Band, Los Angeles, California (Rose Bowl participant)

=== 1949 ===
- All City Junior High Band
- Antelope Valley High School Marching Band
- Bakersfield High School Marching Band
- Bonham Brothers Boys' Band
- Compton College Band
- Elks Symphonic Band
- Glendale Police Boys Band
- Grafton High School Marching Band
- Huntington Park Band
- John Muir High School Marching Band
- Long Beach Band
- Los Angeles Dons Band
- Northwestern University Marching Band
- Salvation Army Band
- Samohl Band
- San Bernardino Valley Marching Band
- Sheriff Boy's Band
- Tournament of Roses Honor Band (Pasadena City College)
- United States Marine Corps Band
- University of California Marching Band

=== 1950 ===
- Alhambra High School Marching Band
- Bakersfield High School Marching Band
- Bonham Brothers Boys Band
- Elks Symphonic Band
- Glendale College Band Marching Band
- Huntington Park City Junior Band
- John Muir Junior College Marching Band
- Long Beach All-District High School Marching Band
- Los Angeles County Sheriff's Boys Band
- Pasadena All-City Junior High School Marching Band
- Polytechnic High School Marching Band
- Pomona High School Marching Band
- Salvation Army Band
- Selma High School Marching Band
- South Gate High School Marching Band
- The Ohio State University Marching Band
- Tournament of Roses Honor Band (Pasadena City College)
- United States Marine Corps Band
- University of California Berkeley Marching Band
- Ventura Junior College Marching Band

=== 1951 ===
- Bakersfield High School Marching Band
- Barstow Union High School Marching Band
- Bonham Brothers Boys Band
- Deputy Auxiliary Police Band
- Elks Symphonic Band
- Glendale Police Boys' Band
- Grafton Parade Band
- Huntington Park City Junior Band
- Inglewood High School Marching Band
- John Muir Junior College Marching Band
- Long Beach City College Marching Band
- Mark Keppel High School Marching Band
- Pasadena All-City Junior High School Marching Band
- Salvation Army Band
- San Bernardino Valley College Marching Band
- Santa Monica High School Marching Band
- Tournament of Roses Honor Band (Pasadena City College)
- United States Marine Corps Band
- University of California Berkeley Marching Band
- University of Michigan Marching Band

=== 1952 ===
- Alhambra High School Marching Band
- Antelope Valley Junior High School Marching Band
- Bakersfield High School Marching Band
- Bonham Brothers Boys Band
- Elks Symphonic Band
- Glendale High School Marching Band
- Huntington Park City Junior Band
- Inglewood Boys' Band Marching Band
- John Muir High School Marching Band
- Leland Stanford Junior University Marching Band
- Los Angeles County Sheriff's Boys Band
- Los Angeles Dept. of Parks & Recreation Marching Band
- Pomona High School Marching Band
- Salvation Army Band
- South Gate City Youth Band
- South Pasadena/San Marino High School Band South
- Tournament of Roses Honor Band (Pasadena City College)
- United States Marine Corps Band
- University of Illinois Marching Band
- Woodrow Wilson High School Marching Band

=== 1953 ===
- Al Malaikah Shrine Band
- Bonham Brothers Boys Band
- Deputy Auxiliary Police Band
- Elks Symphonic Band
- Grossmont High School Marching Band
- Herbert Hoover High School Marching Band
- Huntington Park City Junior Band
- Inglewood Boys' Band Marching Band
- Long Beach Polytechnic High School Marching Band
- Mark Keppel High School Marching Band
- Muir College Marching Band
- Polytechnic High School Marching Band
- Salvation Army Band
- San Bernardino Valley College Marching Band
- Tournament of Roses Honor Band (Pasadena City College)
- Tulare Union High School Marching Band
- United States Air Force Band
- United States Marine Corps Band
- University of Southern California Trojan Marching Band, Los Angeles, California (Rose Bowl participant)
- University of Wisconsin Marching Band

=== 1954 ===
- Alhambra High School Marching Band
- Bonham Brothers Boys Band
- Elks Symphonic Band
- Glendale Police Boys' Band
- Grossmont High School Marching Band
- Huntington Park City Junior Band
- John Muir Junior College Marching Band
- Jordan High School Marching Band
- Los Angeles County Sheriff's Boys Band
- Michigan State University Marching Band
- Mount Lebanon High School Marching Band
- Norwalk High School Marching Band
- Polytechnic High School Marching Band
- Salvation Army Band
- South Gate City Youth Band
- Tournament of Roses Honor Band (Pasadena City College)
- United States Air Corps Band
- United States Marine Corps Band
- United States Sixth Army Band
- University of California at Los Angeles Bruin Marching Band (Rose Bowl participant)

=== 1955 ===
- Academy High School Marching Band
- Antelope Valley Junior High School Marching Band
- Beaumont Cougar Band Marching Band
- Bonham Brothers Boys Band
- Cardinal Whittier High School Marching Band
- Downey High School Marching Band
- Elks Topper Band
- Glendale High School Marching Band
- Grant High School Marching Band
- Inglewood Boys' Band Marching Band
- Long Beach City College Marching Band
- Los Angeles Deputy Police Auxiliary Band
- Mark Keppel High School Marching Band
- Montebello High School Marching Band
- Saint Mary's Band
- Salvation Army Band
- The Ohio State University Marching Band
- Tournament of Roses Honor Band (Pasadena City College)
- United States Marine Corps Band
- United States Military Academy Band
- University of Southern California Trojan Marching Band, Los Angeles, California (Rose Bowl participant)

=== 1956 ===
- Alhambra High School Marching Band
- Arcadia High School Marching Band
- Bonham Brothers Boys Band
- Burbank High School Marching Band
- Elks Topper Band
- Henryetta High School Marching Band
- Herbert Hoover High School Marching Band
- Huntington Park City Junior Band
- Los Angeles County Sheriff's Boys Band
- Massillon High School Marching Band
- Michigan State University Marching Band
- Picayune High School Marching Band
- Riverside Band
- Salvation Army Band
- South Gate High School Marching Band
- Tournament of Roses Honor Band (Pasadena City College)
- United States Air Force Band
- United States Marine Corps Band
- University of California at Los Angeles Bruin Marching Band (Rose Bowl participant)
- Woodrow Wilson High School Marching Band

=== 1957 ===
- Baker High School Marching Band
- Bellingham High School Marching Band
- Bonham Brothers Boys Band
- Edina-Morningside High School Marching Band
- Elks Topper Band
- Glendale Police Boys' Band
- Independent Order of Foresters Marching Band
- Inglewood Boys' Band Marching Band
- Long Beach Junior Concert Band
- Los Angeles Police Junior Band
- Mark Keppel High School Marching Band
- Oregon State University Marching Band
- Pacific Coast Scottish Pipe Band
- Salvation Army Band
- South Gate City Youth Band
- Thomas Jefferson High School Marching Band
- Tournament of Roses Honor Band (Pasadena City College)
- United States Marine Corps Band
- United States Navy Band
- University of Iowa Marching Band

=== 1958 ===
- Alhambra High School Marching Band
- Ben Ali Temple Oriental Band
- Bonham Brothers Boys Band
- Burbank Police Boys' Marching Band
- Cocoa High School Marching Band
- Elks Topper Band
- Huntington Park City Junior Band
- Independent Order of Foresters Marching Band
- Long Beach Polytechnic High School Marching Band
- Los Angeles County Sheriff's Boys Band
- Louisville Male High School Marching Band
- Occidental College Marching Band
- Polytechnic High School Marching Band
- Ponca City High School Marching Band
- Salvation Army Band
- Shawnee Mission District High School Marching Band
- The Ohio State University Marching Band
- Tournament of Roses Honor Band (Pasadena City College)
- United States Marine Corps Band
- University of Oregon Marching Band

=== 1959 ===
- Antelope Valley High School Marching Band
- Bonham Brothers Boys Band
- Clifton High School Marching Band
- Coachella Valley Union High School Marching Band
- Columbus High School Marching Band
- Dr. Pepper Toppers Marching Band
- Glendale High School Marching Band
- Jordan High School Marching Band
- Los Angeles Police Junior Band
- Mark Keppel High School Marching Band
- Mount Lebanon High School Marching Band
- Oconomowoc American Legion Band
- Phoenix Indian High School Marching Band
- Saint Mary's Chinese Girls Band
- Salvation Army Band
- South Gate City Youth Band
- Tournament of Roses Honor Band (Pasadena City College)
- United States Marine Corps Band
- University of California Berkeley Marching Band
- University of Iowa Marching Band

=== 1960 ===
- Alhambra High School Marching Band
- Byrd High School Marching Band
- Chicago Fire Dept. Marching Band
- Downey High School Marching Band
- Dr. Pepper Toppers Marching Band
- El Cajon High School Marching Band
- Independent Order of Foresters Marching Band
- John Burroughs High School Marching Band
- Los Angeles County Sheriff's Boys Band
- Millikan High School Marching Band
- Red Raider High School Marching Band
- Ruskin High School Marching Band
- Salvation Army Band
- Santa Monica High School and College Marching Band
- Tournament of Roses Honor Band (Pasadena City College)
- United States Marine Corps Band
- University of Washington Marching Band
- University of Wisconsin Marching Band
- Warwick Veterans Memorial High School Marching Band
- Weir High School Marching Band

=== 1961 ===
- Adams State College Marching Band
- Blackwell High School Marching Band
- De La Warr High School Marching Band
- Dodge City High School Marching Band
- Grossmont High School Marching Band
- Herbert Hoover High School Marching Band
- Lakewood High School Marching Band
- Los Angeles Police Junior Band
- Manteca Union High School Marching Band
- Montebello High School Marching Band
- Porterville High School Marching Band
- S. & H. Green Stamp Topper Marching Band
- Salvation Army Band
- San Francisco Boys' Club Band
- Torrance All-Star High School Marching Band
- Tournament of Roses Honor Band (Pasadena City College)
- United States Marine Corps Band
- University of Minnesota Marching Band
- University of Washington Marching Band
- Whittier High School Marching Band

=== 1962 ===
- Abington Township High School Marching Band
- Andrew Hill High School Marching Band
- Burbank High School Marching Band
- El Cajon High School Marching Band
- Fairmont High School Marching Band
- Fitchburg High School Marching Band
- Hillsboro Union High School Marching Band
- Independent Order of Foresters Marching Band
- Long Beach All-District High School Marching Band
- Los Angeles County Sheriff's Boys Band
- Mark Keppel High School Marching Band
- Mesquite High School Marching Band
- Oxnard High School Marching Band
- S. & H. Green Stamp Topper Marching Band
- Salvation Army Band
- San Francisco Boys' Club Band
- Santa Monica High School Marching Band
- Tournament of Roses Honor Band (Pasadena City College)
- United States Marine Corps Band
- University of California at Los Angeles Bruin Marching Band (Rose Bowl participant)
- University of Minnesota Marching Band

=== 1963 ===
- Amos Alonzo Stagg High School Marching Band
- Arcadia High School Marching Band
- Ben Davis High School Marching Band
- Boone High School Marching Band
- Downey City Youth Band
- Glendale High School Marching Band
- Lakewood High School Marching Band
- Long Beach All-District High School Marching Band
- Los Angeles Police Junior Band
- Montebello High School Marching Band
- Mount Miguel High School Marching Band
- Pocatello High School Marching Band
- S. & H. Green Stamp Topper Marching Band
- Salvation Army Band
- Tournament of Roses Honor Band (Pasadena City College)
- Treadwell High School Marching Band
- United States Marine Corps Band
- University of Southern California Trojan Marching Band, Los Angeles, California (Rose Bowl participant)
- University of Wisconsin Marching Band
- Vinson High School Marching Band
- Whittier High School Marching Band

=== 1964 ===
- Alhambra High School Marching Band
- Berkeley High School Marching Band
- Burbank Police Boys' Marching Band
- Calexico High School Marching Band
- Glendora High School Marching Band
- Isaac Litton High School Marching Band
- Long Beach All-District High School Marching Band
- Melvindale High School Marching Band
- Montana Centennial Marching Band
- Mount Miguel High School Marching Band
- Mutual Savings & Loan "Toppers" Band (Union Band)
- Nyssa High School Marching Band
- Pasadena High School Marching Band
- Prince George High School Marching Band
- Roosevelt High School Marching Band
- Salvation Army Band
- South Gate City Youth Band
- Tournament of Roses Honor Band (Pasadena City College)
- United States Marine Corps Band
- United States Sixth Army Band
- University of Illinois Marching Band
- University of Washington Marching Band

=== 1965 ===
- American Legion Indian Band
- Antelope Valley High School Marching Band
- Carson High School Marching Band
- Colonial High School Marching Band
- De Anza High School Marching Band
- El Cajon High School Marching Band
- Freemont High School Marching Band
- Glendale School Marching Band
- Inglewood High School Marching Band
- John Muir High School Marching Band
- Lakewood High School Marching Band
- Long Beach All-District High School Marching Band
- Los Angeles Police Junior Band
- Mark Keppel High School Marching Band
- Mississippi Valley State College Marching Band
- Mutual Savings & Loan "Toppers" Band (Union Band)
- Oregon State University Marching Band
- Salvation Army Band
- Tournament of Roses Honor Band (Pasadena City College)
- United States Marine Corps Band
- University of Michigan Marching Band
- Valley High School Marching Band

=== 1966 ===
- British Columbia Centennial Beefeater Band
- Tenri High School Marching Band
- Arcadia High School Marching Band
- Bakersfield College Marching Band
- Burbank All-City High School Marching Band
- Carbon High School Marching Band
- Castleberry High School Marching Band
- Durand Area High School Marching Band
- James Monroe High School Marching Band
- Klamath Union High School Marching Band
- Long Beach All-District High School Marching Band
- Michigan State University Marching Band
- Mount Miguel High School Marching Band
- Mutual Savings & Loan "Toppers" Band (Union Band)
- Sacramento City College Marching Band
- Salvation Army Band
- Sidney High School Marching Band
- South Gate City Youth Band
- St. Ann's Senior CYO Band
- Tournament of Roses Honor Band (Pasadena City College)
- United States Marine Corps Band
- University of California, Los Angeles Bruin Marching Band (Rose Bowl participant)

=== 1967 ===
- Arlington High School Marching Band
- Bucklin High School Marching Band
- Capuchino High School Marching Band
- Columbia High School Marching Band
- Dos Palos High School Marching Band
- El Capitan High School Marching Band
- Fifteenth Air Force Band
- Glendale School Marching Band
- Granada Hills High School Marching Band
- Independent Order of Foresters Marching Band
- Long Beach All-District High School Marching Band
- Montclair High School Marching Band
- Mutual Savings & Loan "Toppers" Band (Union Band)
- Porterville High School Marching Band
- Purdue University Marching Band
- Salvation Army Band
- Tooele High School Marching Band
- Tournament of Roses Honor Band (Pasadena City College)
- United States Marine Corps Band
- United States Navy Band
- University of Southern California Trojan Marching Band, Los Angeles, California (Rose Bowl participant)
- Whittier High School Marching Band

=== 1968 ===
- Burbank All-City High School Marching Band
- Disneyland Band
- Eisenhower High School Marching Band
- Hapeville High School Marching Band
- Hilltop High School Marching Band
- Indiana University Marching Band
- Kalani High School Marching Band
- Long Beach All-District High School Marching Band
- Los Angeles Police Junior Band
- Mississippi Valley State College Marching Band
- Mutual Savings & Loan "Toppers" Band (Union Band)
- Phoenix Indian High School Marching Band
- Salvation Army Band
- Strategic Air Command Band Offutt AFB NE
- Taft High School Marching Band
- Tournament of Roses Honor Band (Pasadena City College)
- United States Continental Army Band
- United States Marine Corps Band
- University of Southern California Trojan Marching Band, Los Angeles, California (Rose Bowl participant)
- White Pine High School Marching Band
- Woodland High School Marching Band

=== 1969 ===
- Beaver High School Marching Band
- Bernard Fire Department Band
- Buena High School Marching Band
- Charles M. Russell High School Marching Band
- Charleston High School Marching Band
- Glendale District Band
- Long Beach All-District High School Marching Band
- McDonald's All-American High School Marching Band
- Mount Miguel High School Marching Band
- Mutual Savings & Loan "Toppers" Band (Union Band)
- Prince George High School Marching Band
- Riverview High School Marching Band
- Rutgers University Marching Band
- Salvation Army Band
- The Ohio State University Marching Band
- Tournament of Roses Honor Band (Pasadena City College)
- United States 14th Army Band (Women's Army Corps)
- United States Marine Corps Band
- University of Southern California Trojan Marching Band, Los Angeles, California (Rose Bowl participant)
- West High School Marching Band (Columbus)
- Western States Army National Guard Band

=== 1970 ===
- Burlington Teen Tour Band
- Alain LeRoy Locke High School Marching Band
- Arkansas City High School Marching Band
- Burbank All-City High School Marching Band
- Deer Park High School Marching Band
- La Crosse High School Marching Band
- Lakewood High School Marching Band
- Long Beach All-District High School Marching Band
- Marshalltown "Bobcat" Marching Band
- McDonald's All-American High School Marching Band
- Monarch High School Marching Band
- Mutual Savings & Loan "Toppers" Band (Union Band)
- Orangeburg High School Marching Band
- Port Chester High School Marching Band
- Salvation Army Band
- Santa Ana "Marching Saints" Santa Ana CA
- South Carolina State College Marching 101
- Tournament of Roses Honor Band (Pasadena City College)
- United States Marine Corps Band
- University of Michigan Marching Band
- University of Southern California Trojan Marching Band, Los Angeles, California (Rose Bowl participant)
- White Oak High School Marching Band

=== 1971 ===
- C. E. King High School Marching Band
- Cupertino High School Marching Band
- Englewood High School Marching Band
- Glendale School Marching Band
- Glendora High School Marching Band
- Granada Hills High School Marching Band
- Hilo High School Marching Band
- Huntington High School Marching Band
- Leavenworth High School Marching Band
- Leland Stanford Junior University Marching Band
- Long Beach All-District High School Marching Band
- McDonald's All-American High School Marching Band
- Morris Brown College Marching Band
- Mount Miguel High School Marching Band
- Mutual Savings & Loan "Toppers" Band (Union Band)
- Plymouth Carver Regional High School Marching Band
- Salvation Army Band
- Santa Monica College Marching Band
- The Ohio State University Marching Band
- Tournament of Roses Honor Band (Pasadena City College)
- United States Marine Corps Band
- Massed Pipes and Drums
- Regina Lions Junior "A" Marching Band

=== 1972 ===
- American Fork High School Marching Band
- Ben Davis High School Marching Band
- Burbank All-City High School Marching Band
- Charleston High School Marching Band
- Helix High School Marching Band
- John Marshall High School Marching Band
- Leland Stanford Junior University Marching Band
- Locke High School Marching Band
- Long Beach All-District High School Marching Band
- McDonald's All-American High School Marching Band
- Mutual Savings & Loan "Toppers" Band (Union Band)
- Newport Harbor High School Marching Band
- Plattsmouth High School Marching Band
- Salvation Army Band
- Seabreeze Marching 100
- Spring Branch High School Marching Band
- Tournament of Roses Honor Band (Pasadena City College)
- United States Marine Corps Band
- University of Michigan Marching Band
- Wauwatosa East High School Marching Band

=== 1973 ===
- Massed Pipes and Drums
- Angleton High School Marching Band
- Arroyo High School Marching Band
- Cal Poly Pomona Marching Band
- Cary High School Marching Band
- Concord High School Marching Band
- Glendale School Marching Band
- Glendora High School Marching Band
- Long Beach All-District High School Marching Band
- Los Angeles Unified School District All-City Band
- McDonald's All-American High School Marching Band
- Memorial High School Marching Band
- Mutual Savings & Loan "Toppers" Band (Union Band)
- Orange Glen High School Marching Band
- Plymouth High School Marching Band
- Salvation Army Band
- Tenafly High School Marching Band
- The Ohio State University Marching Band
- Tournament of Roses Honor Band (Pasadena City College)
- United States Continental Army Band
- United States Marine Corps Band
- University of Southern California Trojan Marching Band, Los Angeles, California (Rose Bowl participant)

=== 1974 ===
- Massed Pipes and Drums
- Arvada West High School Marching Band
- Belton High School Marching Band
- Burbank All-City High School Marching Band
- Christian County High School Marching Band
- Guymon High School Marching Band
- Long Beach All-District High School Marching Band
- Los Angeles Unified School District All-City Band
- McDonald's All-American High School Marching Band
- Mount Miguel High School Marching Band
- Richmond High School Marching Band
- Salvation Army Band
- Samuel Ayer High School Marching Band
- Shelton High School Shelton CT
- South Hadley High School Marching Band
- The Ohio State University Marching Band
- Thomas Jefferson High School Marching Band
- Tournament of Roses Honor Band (Pasadena City College)
- United States Marine Corps Band
- University of Southern California Trojan Marching Band, Los Angeles, California (Rose Bowl participant)

=== 1975 ===
- All Ohio State Fair Youth Choir
- Arcadia High School Marching Band
- Butte High School Marching Band
- Clarke Central High School Marching Band
- Del Norte High School Marching Band
- Glendale School Marching Band
- John Hersey High School Marching Band
- Kearns High School Marching Band
- Long Beach All-District High School Marching Band
- Los Angeles Unified School District All-City Band
- McDonald's All-American High School Marching Band
- Mount Miguel High School Marching Band
- Navajo Nation Marching Band
- Orange Glen High School Marching Band
- Salvation Army Band
- Shorecrest High School Marching Band
- Sunnyvale High School Marching Band
- The Ohio State University Marching Band
- Tournament of Roses Honor Band (Pasadena City College)
- United States Marine Corps Band
- University of Southern California Trojan Marching Band, Los Angeles, California (Rose Bowl participant)
- West High School Marching Band (Torrance)

=== 1976 ===
- All-Canada Pipers Band – "Scarlet and Brass" band
- Municipal Band of the City of Geneva Geneva Switzerland
- Armijo High School Marching Band
- Burbank All-City High School Marching Band
- Dodge City High School Marching Band
- Freedom High School Marching Band
- Jefferson City High School Marching Jay Band
- Lakewood High School Marching Band
- Long Prairie High School Marching Band
- Los Altos High School Marching Band
- Los Angeles Unified School District All-City Band
- McDonald's All-American High School Marching Band
- Mount Vernon High School Marching Band
- Salvation Army Band
- San Pasqual High School Marching Band
- St. Albans High School Marching Band
- The Ohio State University Marching Band
- Tournament of Roses Honor Band (Pasadena City College)
- United States Marine Corps Band
- University of California, Los Angeles Bruin Marching Band (Rose Bowl participant)
- US Army 3rd Infantry (Old Guard) Fife and Drum Corps
- Vista High School Marching Band

=== 1977 ===
- Bullard High School Marching Band
- California State University, Long Beach "Big Brown Music Machine" Marching Band
- Cary High School Marching Band
- Concord High School Marching Band
- Estancia High School Marching Band
- Fairview High School Marching Band
- Glendora High School Marching Band
- Helix High School Marching Band
- John Marshall High School Marching Band
- Lawrenceburg High School Marching Band
- Live Oak High School Marching Band
- Los Angeles Unified School District All-City Band
- McDonald's All-American High School Marching Band
- Mount Miguel High School Marching Band
- Pacifica High School Marching Band
- Pasadena High School Marching Band
- Salvation Army Band
- Tournament of Roses Honor Band (Pasadena City College)
- Union-Endicott High School Marching Band
- United States Marine Corps Band
- University of Michigan Marching Band
- University of Southern California Trojan Marching Band, Los Angeles, California (Rose Bowl participant)

=== 1978 ===
- Adlai E. Stevenson High School Marching Band
- All Ohio State Fair Youth Choir
- Centennial High School Marching Band
- Chambersburg Area High School Marching Band
- Colton High School Marching Band
- Fort Walton Beach High School Marching Band
- Hellgate High School Marching Band
- Independence High School Marching Band
- Los Altos High School Marching Band
- Los Angeles Unified School District All-City Band
- McDonald's All-American High School Marching Band
- Paradise Valley High School Marching Band
- Poway High School Marching Band
- Roosevelt High School Marching Band
- Ruskin High School Marching Band
- Salvation Army Band
- Spring Hill High High School Marching Band
- Tournament of Roses Honor Band (Pasadena City College)
- United States Marine Corps Band
- University of Michigan Marching Band
- University of Washington Marching Band

=== 1979 ===
- Ontario Massed Legion of Pipes and Drums
- Arcadia High School Marching Band
- Aurora High School Marching Band
- Ben Davis High School Marching Band
- Foothill High School Marching Band
- Glen A. Wilson High School Marching Band
- Glenbrook South High School Marching Band
- Huntington High School Marching Band
- Kamehameha Schools Marching Band
- Los Angeles Unified School District All-City Band
- McDonald's All-American High School Marching Band
- McGavock High School Marching Band
- Mount Miguel High School Marching Band
- Pampa High School Marching Band
- Salvation Army Band
- Tournament of Roses Honor Band (Pasadena City College)
- Tulare Union High School Marching Band
- United States Air Force Academy Band
- United States Marine Corps Band
- University of Michigan Marching Band
- University of Southern California Trojan Marching Band, Los Angeles, California (Rose Bowl participant)
- West High School Marching Band (Torrance)
- Winter Haven High School Marching Band

=== 1980 ===
- All Nations American Indian Band Various
- All Ohio State Fair Youth Choir
- Burlington Teen Tour Band
- Century High School Marching Band
- Colton High School Marching Band
- Conestoga Senior High School Marching Band
- Englewood High School Marching Band
- Fairfield High School Marching Band
- Glendora High School Marching Band
- Helix High School Marching Band
- Huntington Beach High School Marching Band
- Los Altos High School Marching Band
- Los Angeles Unified School District All-City Band
- McDonald's All-American High School Marching Band
- Pearl City High School Marching Band
- Riverview High School Marching Band
- Salvation Army Band
- Southern University Marching Band
- The Ohio State University Marching Band (Rose Bowl participant)
- Thomas Jefferson High School Marching Band
- Tournament of Roses Honor Band (Pasadena City College)
- United States Marine Corps Band
- University of Southern California Trojan Marching Band, Los Angeles, California (Rose Bowl participant) (Rose Bowl participant)
- Westchester High School Marching Band

=== 1981 ===
- Acadiana High School Marching Band
- Arcadia High School Marching Band
- Cardozo High School Marching Band
- Carrollton High School Marching Band
- Defiance High School Marching Band
- Douglas County High School Marching Band
- Edison High School Marching Band
- Glen A. Wilson High School Marching Band
- Harlingen High School Marching Band
- Hibbing High School Marching Band
- Kahuku High School Marching Band
- Kanto Gakuin High School Yokohama Japan
- Liberal High School Marching Band
- Los Angeles Unified School District All-City Band
- Mead High School Marching Band
- Ontario Massed Legion of Pipes and Drums
- Pasadena City College Swing Choir
- Poway High School Marching Band
- Salvation Army Band
- San Jose State University Marching Band
- Tournament of Roses Honor Band (Pasadena City College)
- United States Marine Corps Band
- University of Michigan Marching Band (Rose Bowl participant)
- University of Washington Marching Band (Rose Bowl participant)

=== 1982 ===
- 1st Canadian Regiment Drum & Bugle Corps
- Antelope Valley High School Marching Band
- Arcadia High School Marching Band
- Blue Springs High School Marching Band
- Bonnabel Senior High School Marching Band
- Dennis-Yarmouth High School Marching Band
- Jackson High School Marching Band
- Kalani High School Marching Band
- Lincoln-Way Community High School Marching Band
- Los Angeles Unified School District All-City Band
- McDonald's All-American High School Marching Band
- Midland High School Marching Band
- Mount Miguel High School Marching Band
- Northern Lebanon High School Marching Band
- Orange Glen High School Marching Band
- Palo Verde High School Marching Band
- Porterville High School Marching Band
- Salvation Army Band
- Tournament of Roses Honor Band (Pasadena City College)
- United States Marine Corps Band
- University of Iowa Marching Band (Rose Bowl participant)
- University of Washington Marching Band (Rose Bowl participant)

=== 1983 ===
- Buena High School Marching Band
- Concord High School Marching Band
- East Hall High School Marching Band
- Elko High School Marching Band
- Freedom High School Marching Band
- Independence High School Marching Band
- Jonesboro High School Marching Band
- Jones Junior College Marching Band
- Leavenworth High School Marching Band
- Los Altos High School Marching Band
- Los Angeles Unified School District All-City Band
- Magnolia High School Marching Band
- Marshall County High School Marching Band
- McDonald's All-American High School Marching Band
- Monticello High School Marching Band
- Patrick Henry Patriot Marching Band
- Salvation Army Band
- Tournament of Roses Honor Band (Pasadena City College)
- United States Air Force Academy Band
- United States Continental Army Band
- United States Marine Corps Band
- University of California, Los Angeles Bruin Marching Band (Rose Bowl participant)
- University of Michigan Marching Band (Rose Bowl participant)

=== 1984 ===
- Allen High School Marching Band
- Cary High School Marching Band
- Espanola Valley High School Marching Band
- Glencoe High School Marching Band
- Glendora High School Marching Band
- Homewood High School Marching Band
- John S. Battle High School Marching Band
- John W. North High School Marching Band
- Los Angeles Unified School District All-City Band
- Mater Dei High School Marching Band
- McDonald's All-American High School Marching Band
- Missoula High School Marching Band
- Montebello High School Marching Band
- Mt. Carmel High School Marching Band
- Newcastle & Hunter Region Combined High School Marching Band
- Newton Community High School Marching Band
- Pearl City High School Marching Band
- Round Rock High School Marching Band
- Salvation Army Band
- Tournament of Roses Honor Band (Pasadena City College)
- Tulare Union High School Marching Band
- United States Marine Corps Band
- University of California, Los Angeles Bruin Marching Band (Rose Bowl participant)
- University of Illinois Marching Band (Rose Bowl participant)

=== 1985 ===
- Arcadia High School Marching Band
- Auburn High School Marching Band
- Ben Davis High School Marching Band
- Colton High School Marching Band
- El Toro High School Marching Band
- Foothill High School Marching Band
- Lakeland High School Marching Band
- Los Angeles Unified School District All-City Band
- McDonald's All-American High School Marching Band
- Midland High School Marching Band
- Musique Municipale de la Ville De Geneve Geneva Switzerland
- Owasso High School Marching Band
- Poway High School Marching Band
- Punahou High School Marching Band
- Salvation Army Band
- The Ohio State University Marching Band (Rose Bowl participant)
- Tournament of Roses Honor Band (Pasadena City College)
- Troopers Drum & Bugle Corps
- Union City High School Marching Band
- United States Marine Corps Band
- University of Southern California Trojan Marching Band, Los Angeles, California (Rose Bowl participant) (Rose Bowl participant)
- Vista High School Marching Band

=== 1986 ===
- British Columbia Centennial Beefeater Band
- Clovis High School Marching Band
- Conroe High School Marching Band
- Glen A. Wilson High School Marching Band
- Jamestown High School Marching Band
- Las Cruces High School Marching Band
- Los Angeles Unified School District All-City Band
- McDonald's All-American High School Marching Band
- Miliani High School Marching Band
- Patrick Henry Patriot Marching Band
- Pennsbury High School Marching Band
- Porterville High School Marching Band
- Prospect High School Marching Band
- Rockford High School Marching Band
- Salvation Army Band
- Tate High School Marching Band
- Thomas Jefferson High School Marching Band
- Tournament of Roses Honor Band (Pasadena City College)
- Ukiah High School Marching Band
- United States Marine Corps Band
- University of California, Los Angeles Bruin Marching Band (Rose Bowl participant)
- University of Iowa Marching Band (Rose Bowl participant)

=== 1987 ===
- Arizona State University Marching Band (Rose Bowl participant)
- Boardman High School Marching Band
- Burlington Teen Tour Band
- Forest Lake High School Marching Band
- Harlingen High School Marching Band
- Holland High School Marching Band
- John Overton High School Marching Band
- Lincoln High School Marching Band
- Los Angeles Unified School District All-City Band
- McDonald's All-American High School Marching Band
- Missoula High School Marching Band
- Notre Dame High School Marching Band
- Riverview High School Marching Band
- Rocky Mount High School Marching Band
- Royal Jordanian Armed Forces Band
- Saint Louis High School Marching Band
- Salvation Army Band
- Stevens High School Marching Band
- Suzu Vocational High School Marching Band
- Tournament of Roses Honor Band (Pasadena City College)
- United States Marine Corps Band
- United Way Marching Band
- University of Michigan Marching Band (Rose Bowl participant)

=== 1988 ===
- Blackstone-Millville Junior/Senior High School Marching Band
- Castle High School Marching Band
- Choctawhatchee High School Marching Band
- Jefferson City High School Marching Band
- Lassiter High School Marching Band
- Los Angeles Unified School District All-City Band
- Michigan State University Marching Band (Rose Bowl participant)
- Mt. Carmel High School Marching Band
- Northrop High School Marching Band
- Oak Grove High School Marching Band
- O'Fallon Township High School Marching Band
- Overland High School Marching Band
- Pella Community High School Marching Band
- Salvation Army Band
- Toms River High School South Marching Band
- Tournament of Roses Honor Band (Pasadena City College)
- Tulare Union High School Marching Band
- United States Marine Corps Band
- University of Southern California Trojan Marching Band, Los Angeles, California (Rose Bowl participant) (Rose Bowl participant)
- Vallejo High School Marching Band

=== 1989 ===
- Arcadia High School Marching Band
- Auburn High School Marching Band
- Carrollton High School Marching Band
- Duncanville High School Marching Band
- Freedom High School Marching Band
- Huntington High School Marching Band
- Kamehameha Schools Marching Band
- Kanto Gakuin High School Marching Band
- Los Angeles Unified School District All-City Band
- McDonald's All-American High School Marching Band
- Mountain View High School Spartan Marching Band
- North Dakota High School Marching Band
- Ontario Massed Legion of Pipes and Drums
- Owasso High School Marching Band
- Porterville High School Marching Band
- Poway High School Marching Band
- Salvation Army Band
- Strongsville High School Marching Band
- Tournament of Roses Honor Band (Pasadena City College)
- United States Marine Corps Band
- University of Michigan Marching Band (Rose Bowl participant)
- University of Southern California Trojan Marching Band, Los Angeles, California (Rose Bowl participant) (Rose Bowl participant)
- Westview High School Marching Band

=== 1990 ===
- Alexis I. DuPont High School Marching Band
- Castle Park High School Marching Band
- Cicero-North Syracuse High School Marching Band
- Cooper High School Marching Band
- East Carteret High School Marching Band
- Grove City High School Marching Band
- House of Sampoerna Marching Band
- Jefferson High School Marching Band
- Los Angeles Unified School District All-City Band
- Merced High School Marching Band
- Missoula High School Marching Band
- Moanalua High School Marching Band
- Red Lion Inns' Marching Band (One More Time Around Again Band)
- Riverside Community College Marching Band
- Salvation Army Band
- Santa Ana Winds Youth Band Santa Ana CA
- Tenri-Kyo High School Band – Tenri Seminary High School Tenri, Nara Japan
- Tournament of Roses Honor Band (Pasadena City College)
- United States Marine Corps Band
- University of Michigan Marching Band (Rose Bowl participant)
- University of Southern California Trojan Marching Band, Los Angeles, California (Rose Bowl participant) (Rose Bowl participant)
- Zurich City Police Band Zurich Switzerland

=== 1991 ===
- Aloha High School Marching Band
- Ben Davis High School Marching Band
- Clovis High School Marching Band
- House of Sampoerna Marching Band
- Los Angeles Unified School District All-City Band
- Metallharmonie St. Otmar/St. Gallen Waldkirch/SG Switzerland
- Mount Miguel High School Marching band
- Normal Community High School Marching Band
- Norwalk High School Marching Band
- Olathe North High School Marching Band
- Patriots of Northern Virginia Colonial Regiment Arlington VA
- Salvation Army Band
- Shinagawa High School Marching Band (Girls school)
- Shorecrest High School Marching Band
- Tournament of Roses Honor Band (Pasadena City College)
- United States Coast Guard Band & Precision Drill Team
- United States Marine Corps Band
- University of Iowa Marching Band (Rose Bowl participant)
- University of Washington Marching Band (Rose Bowl participant)
- Upland High School Marching Band
- Vallejo High School Marching Band
- Vero Beach High School Marching Band
- Wyoming All-State High School Band

=== 1992 ===
- Air Academy High School Marching Band
- Carlisle High School Marching Band
- Desoto High School Marching Band
- Foothill High School Marching Band
- Forest Lake High School Marching Band
- Hemet High School Marching Band
- Hilo High School Marching Band
- Kendrick High School Marching Band
- Kickapoo High School Marching Band
- Lincoln High School Marching Band
- Londonderry High School Marching Band
- Los Angeles Unified School District All-City Band
- Marshall County High School Marching Band
- Salvation Army Band
- Springfield High School Marching Band
- Tournament of Roses Honor Band (Pasadena City College)
- United States Marine Corps Band (Rose Bowl participant)
- University of Michigan Marching Band
- University of Washington Marching Band (Rose Bowl participant)
- West High School Marching Band (Torrance)

=== 1993 ===
- Arcadia High School Marching Band
- Blue Springs High School Marching Band
- Castle Park High School Marching Band
- Diamond Bar High School Marching Band
- Gilbert High School Marching Band
- Hermitage High School Marching Band
- Hunter Region High School Marching Band
- Lincoln High School Marching Band
- Los Angeles Unified School District All-City Band
- Maurice-Orange City High School Marching Band
- Mercer Island High School Marching Band
- Osaka Federation High School Honor Band Osaka Japan
- Pickerington High School Marching Band
- Robert E. Lee High School Marching Band
- Salvation Army Band
- Sprayberry High School Marching Band
- Tournament of Roses Honor Band (Pasadena City College)
- United States Marine Corps Band
- University of Michigan Marching Band (Rose Bowl participant)
- University of Washington Marching Band (Rose Bowl participant)
- Westbrook High School Marching Band

=== 1994 ===
- Canadian Massed Pipes and Drums
- Comeaux High School Marching Band
- Deer Valley High School Marching Band
- Easton Area High School Marching Band
- Fairfield High School Marching Band
- Haukerod, Fevang & Krokemoa, Sandefjord Haukerod Skolekorps Sandefjord Norway
- Hermiston High School Marching Band
- Kahuku High School Marching Band
- Lincoln Northeast High School Marching Band
- Los Angeles Unified School District All-City Band
- Musashino Gakuin High School Marching Band
- Northrop High School Marching Band
- Pipestone High School Marching Band
- Port Washington High School Marching Band
- Rancho Bernardo High School
- Salvation Army Band
- Taipei First Girl High School Taipei Taiwan
- Tournament of Roses Honor Band (Pasadena City College)
- United States Marine Corps Band
- University of California, Los Angeles Bruin Marching Band (Rose Bowl participant)
- University of Wisconsin Marching Band (Rose Bowl participant)
- Walterboro High School Marching Band
- Willowridge High School Marching Band

=== 1995 ===
- Alexis I. DuPont High School Marching Band
- Elko High School Marching Band
- Ferndale High School Marching Band
- Fort Mill High School Marching Band
- Greenville High School Marching Band
- Holland High School Marching Band
- Los Angeles Unified School District All-City Band
- Meijo Gakuin High School Marching Band
- Moanalua High School Marching Band
- Morris Brown College Marching Band
- Newton High School Marching Band
- Owasso High School Marching Band
- Penn State University Marching Blue Band (Rose Bowl participant)
- Polizei Musik Basel Switzerland
- Poway High School Marching Band
- Salvation Army Band
- Southwest Missouri State University Marching Band
- Tournament of Roses Honor Band (Pasadena City College)
- United States Marine Corps Band
- University of Oregon Marching Band (Rose Bowl participant)
- Waukesha North High School Marching Band
- West High School Marching Band (Torrance)

=== 1996 ===
- Blue Springs High School Marching Band
- Dartmouth High School Marching Band
- Etiwanda High School Marching Band
- Franklin High School Marching Band
- Henry Ford II Falcon High School Marching Band
- Jones Junior College Marching Band
- Leander High School Marching Band
- Los Angeles Unified School District All-City Band
- Monache High School Marching Band
- Muhomet-Seymour High School Marching Band
- Nishihara High School Marching Band
- Northwestern University Marching Band (Rose Bowl participant)
- Parkway Central High School Marching Band
- Pearl City High School Marching Band
- Pomona High School Marching Band
- Royal British Legion Youth Band
- Salvation Army Band
- Taipei First Girl High School Taipei Taiwan
- Tate High School Marching Band
- Tournament of Roses Honor Band (Pasadena City College)
- United States Marine Corps Band
- University of Southern California Trojan Marching Band, Los Angeles, California (Rose Bowl participant) (Rose Bowl participant)
- Westwood High School Marching Band

=== 1997 ===
- Arizona State University Marching Band (Rose Bowl participant)
- Calgary Stampede Show Band
- Colony High School Marching Band
- Denver Citywide Marching Band (composite of 10)
- Iolani High School Marching Band
- Joel E. Ferris High School Marching Band
- Londonderry High School Marching Band
- Los Angeles Unified School District All-City Band
- Newman High School Marching Band
- North Allegheny High School Marching Band
- North Park Middle School Marching Band
- O'Fallon Township High School Marching Band
- Ondine Genevoise Geneva Switzerland
- Pickerington High School Marching Band
- Riverside Community College Marching Band
- Salvation Army Band
- Scottsboro High School Marching Band
- The Ohio State University Marching Band (Rose Bowl participant)
- Tournament of Roses Honor Band (Pasadena City College)
- United States Marine Corps Band

=== 1998 ===
- Alexandria-Jefferson High School Marching Band
- American Fork High School Marching Band
- Arcadia High School Marching Band
- Derby High School Marching Band
- Foothill High School Marching Band
- Grenada High School Marching Band
- Jackson High School Marching Band
- Jefferson High School Marching Band
- Lincoln High School Marching Band
- Los Angeles Unified School District All-City Band
- Mililani High School Marching Band
- Monfort College Band & Assumption College Marching Band
- Salvation Army Band
- Sumner High School Marching Band
- Tournament of Roses Honor Band (Pasadena City College)
- United States Marine Corps Band
- University High School Marching Band
- University of Michigan Marching Band (Rose Bowl participant)
- Washington State University Marching Band (Rose Bowl participant)
- Washington Township High School Marching Band
- Yorkton Regional High School Yorkton, Saskatchewan Canada

=== 1999 ===
- Alexis I. DuPont High School Marching Band
- Bloomington High School North Marching Band
- Blue Springs High School Marching Band
- Bozeman High School Marching Band
- Cheshire High School Marching Band
- Cy-Fair High School Marching Band
- Defiance High School Marching Band
- Elko High School Marching Band
- Lincoln High School Marching Band
- Los Angeles Unified School District All-City Band
- Marjory Stoneman Douglas High School Marching Band
- Punahou High School Marching Band
- Salvation Army Band
- Science High School Marching Band
- Tempe High School Marching Band
- Thousand Oaks High School Marching Band
- Tournament of Roses Honor Band (Pasadena City College)
- United States Marine Corps Band
- University of California, Los Angeles Bruin Marching Band (Rose Bowl participant)
- University of Wisconsin Marching Band (Rose Bowl participant)

=== 2000 ===
- Arcadia High School Marching Band
- Butler High School Marching Band
- East Fairmont High School Busy Bee Band & Honeybees
- Fairfield High School Marching Band
- Grove City High School Marching Band
- James F. Byrnes High School Marching Band
- Kashiwa Municipal High School Marching Band
- Leland Stanford Junior University Marching Band (Rose Bowl participant)
- Lincoln-Way Community High School Marching Band
- Los Angeles Unified School District All-City Band
- Mayfield High School Marching Band
- Mead & Mt. Spokane High School Marching Band
- Pearl City High School Marching Band
- Pflugerville High School Marching Band
- Reedley High School Marching Band
- Salvation Army Band
- Tournament of Roses Honor Band (Pasadena City College)
- United States Marine Corps Band
- University of Wisconsin Marching Band (Rose Bowl participant)
- Wyoming All-State High School Band

=== 2001 ===
- Ashwaubenon High School Marching Band
- Banda Escolar de Guayanilla Guayanilla Puerto Rico
- Benicia High School Marching Band
- Coppell High School Marching Band
- Danvers High School Marching Band
- Diamond Bar High School Marching Band
- Downingtown High School Marching Band
- Glendora High School Marching Band
- Highland High School Marching Band
- Jamestown High School Marching Band
- Joplin High School Marching Band
- Lassiter High School Marching Band
- Los Angeles Unified School District All-City Band
- Penn High School Marching Band
- Purdue University Marching Band (Rose Bowl participant)
- Rancho Bernardo High School Marching Band
- Salem High School Marching Band
- Salvation Army Band
- Spruce Creek High School Marching Band
- Tournament of Roses Honor Band (Pasadena City College)
- United States Marine Corps Band
- University of Washington Marching Band (Rose Bowl participant)
- Zurich City Police Band Zurich Switzerland

=== 2002 ===
- Blue Springs South High School Marching Band
- Chino High School 77th Cavalry Marching Band and Colorguard
- Christ's Hospital Band, Christ's Hospital School
- Columbine High School Marching Band
- De Soto High School Marching Band
- Detroit Public Schools All-City Marching Band
- Dobyns-Bennett High School Marching Band
- Frank Scott Bunnell High School Marching Band
- Kamehameha Schools Marching Band
- Kennewick High School Marching Band (Kennewick, Washington)
- Los Angeles Unified School District All-City Band
- Marist High School Marching Band
- Salvation Army Band
- St. Augustine High School Marching Band
- Stephenson High School Marching Band
- Strongsville High School Marching Band
- Tournament of Roses Honor Band (Pasadena City College)
- Union High School Marching Band
- United States Marine Corps Band
- University of Miami Marching Band (Rose Bowl participant)
- University of Nebraska Marching Band (Rose Bowl participant)
- Waukesha North High School Marching Band

=== 2003 ===
- All-Shiga High School Marching Band
- Arcadia High School Marching Band
- Attica Senior High School Marching Band
- Calgary Stampede Show Band
- Davis High High School Marching Band
- Homestead High School Marching Band
- Homewood High School Marching Band
- James Logan High School Marching Band
- Lexington High School Marching Band
- Los Angeles Unified School District All-City Band
- Mountain View High School Marching Band
- North Royalton High School Marching Band
- Pella Community High School Marching Band
- Rancho Buena Vista High School Marching Band
- Salvation Army Band
- South Dakota State University Marching Band
- Tournament of Roses Honor Band (Pasadena City College)
- United States Marine Corps Band
- University of Oklahoma Marching Band (Rose Bowl participant)
- Walton High School Marching Band
- Washington State University Marching Band (Rose Bowl participant)
- Westlake High School Marching Band

=== 2004 ===
- Aguiluchos Marching Band-Puebla México
- Alexis I. DuPont High School Marching Band
- Ambridge Area High School Marching Band
- Central Carroll High School Marching Band
- Clark County High School Marching Band
- Columbus North High School Marching Band
- Idaho High School Marching Band
- Londonderry High School Marching Band
- Los Angeles Unified School District All-City Band
- Odessa-Permian Composite High School Marching Band
- Owasso High School Marching Band
- Riverside Community College Marching Band
- Salvation Army Band
- Santa Clara Vanguard Drum & Bugle Corps
- Temple City High School Marching Band
- Tournament of Roses Honor Band (Pasadena City College)
- United States Air Force Academy Band
- United States Marine Corps Band
- University of Michigan Marching Band (Rose Bowl participant)
- University of Southern California Trojan Marching Band, Los Angeles, California (Rose Bowl participant) (Rose Bowl participant)
- Valley High School Marchmasters Band, West Des Moines, Iowa

=== 2005 ===
- Bands of America Honor Band
- Benicia High School Marching Band
- Conservatorio de las Artes Marching Band
- El Dorado High School Marching Band
- Hellgate High School Marching Band
- Hempfield High School Marching Band
- Kaua'i "Ku Kilakila" All Island Marching Band
- Lassiter High School Marching Band
- Lawrence High School Marching Band
- Lincoln High School Marching Band
- Lindbergh High School Marching Band
- Los Angeles Unified School District All-City Band
- North Park Middle School Marching Band
- Oswego High School Marching Band
- Pasadena Unified School District All-Star Band
- Pomona High School Marching Band
- Salvation Army Band
- Seminole High School Marching Band
- Taipei First Girl High School Taipei Taiwan
- Tournament of Roses Honor Band (Pasadena City College)
- United States Marine Corps Band
- University of Michigan Marching Band (Rose Bowl participant)
- University of Texas Marching Band (Rose Bowl participant)
- Winston Churchill High School Marching Band

=== 2006 ===
- Alabama A&M University Marching Band
- Allen Eagle High School Marching Band
- Banda de Musica de la escuela Secundaria #22, "Nuestros Ángeles de Sonora", San Luis Río Colorado, Sonora, Mexico.
- Ben Davis High School Marching Band
- Canadian Massed Pipes and Drums
- Danvers High School Marching Band
- Fayetteville High School Marching Band
- Foothill High School Marching Band
- Hoover High School Marching Band
- Los Angeles Unified School District All-City Band
- Lowndes High School Marching Band
- Mercer Island High School Marching Band
- Mt. Carmel High School Marching Band
- Pasadena Unified School District All-Star Band
- Pearl City High School Marching Band
- Pickerington High School North and Central Marching Band
- Prospect High School Marching Band
- Salvation Army Band
- Seika Girls High School Marching Band
- Southwest DeKalb High School Marching Band
- Tournament of Roses Honor Band (Pasadena City College)
- United States Marine Corps Band
- University of Southern California Trojan Marching Band, Los Angeles, California (Rose Bowl participant) (Rose Bowl participant)
- University of Texas Marching Band (Rose Bowl participant)
- Webb City High School Marching Band

=== 2007 ===
- Australian Southern Stars Marching Band
- Butler High School Marching Band
- Delfines Marching Band Vera Cruz Mexico
- Dobyns-Bennett High School Marching Band
- Fayette County High School Marching Band
- Grambling State University Marching Band (Star Wars Spectacular, band dressed as Storm Troopers)
- Kingwood High School Marching Band
- Lakeville North High School Marching Band
- Los Angeles Unified School District All-City Band
- Louisiana Leadership Institute High School Marching Band
- Mountain Ridge High School Marching Band
- Oklahoma All-Star Centennial Marching Band
- Porterville High School Marching Band
- Pulaski High School Marching Band
- Punahou High School Marching Band
- Riverside King High School Marching Band
- Salvation Army Band
- Tournament of Roses Honor Band (Pasadena City College)
- United States Marine Corps Band
- University of Michigan Marching Band (Rose Bowl participant)
- University of Southern California Trojan Marching Band, Los Angeles, California (Rose Bowl participant) (Rose Bowl participant)
- Waukesha North High School Marching Band

=== 2008 ===
- Akashikita High School Green Band
- Alexis I. DuPont High School Marching Band
- All Kamehameha Schools High School Marching Band
- Arcadia High School Marching Band
- Lakota West High School Marching Band
- Los Angeles Unified School District All-City Band
- Missouri State University Pride Marching Band
- Nacogdoches High School Marching Band
- Needham B. Broughton High School Marching Band
- Niceville High School Marching Band
- Nuestros Angeles de El Salvador
- Salvation Army Band
- South Dakota State University Marching Band
- The Banda Escolar de Guayanilla
- Tournament of Roses Honor Band
- United States Marine Corps Band
- University of Illinois Marching Band (Rose Bowl participant)
- University of Southern California Trojan Marching Band, Los Angeles, California (Rose Bowl participant) (Rose Bowl participant)
- Virginia Military Institute Regimental Band and Pipe Band

=== 2009 ===
- Aguilas Doradas Marching Band, Puebla, Mexico
- Alhambra Unified School District Band
- Ballou Senior High School Band
- Blue Springs High School Golden Regiment Marching Band
- Broken Arrow High School
- Golden Valley High School
- Hawaii All-State Marching Band
- Homewood Patriot Marching Band, Homewood, Alabama
- Honor Band of America
- Liberty High School Grenadier Band (Bethlehem, Pennsylvania)
- Los Angeles Unified All-District Honor Band
- McQueen High School Band
- Pasadena City College Tournament of Roses Honor Band
- Penn State University Marching Blue Band (Rose Bowl participant)
- Prairie View A&M University
- Riverside Community College Marching Tiger Band
- The Royal British Legion Youth Band Brentwood
- The Salvation Army Tournament of Roses Band
- Science Hill High School
- U.S. Marine Corps West Coast Composite Band
- University of Southern California Trojan Marching Band (Rose Bowl participant)

=== 2010 ===
- Banda Musical Latina Pedro Molina (Guatemala)
- Conroe High School (Texas) Tiger Band
- Danvers High School (Massachusetts) Falcon Marching Band
- El Dorado High School (Placentia, California) Golden Hawks
- Farmers' Marching Band (First band on the parade line up) RCC Marching Tigers
- Glendora Tartan Band and Pageantry
- Kansai Green Honor Band (Kansai, Japan)
- Los Angeles Unified School District All District High School Honor Band
- The Marian Catholic High School band
- Millard West High School (Omaha, Nebraska)
- The Ohio State University Marching Band (Rose Bowl participant)
- The Ohio State School for the Marching Blind Band (Second band on the parade line up)
- The Ohio University Marching 110 Band
- Oregon Marching Band (Rose Bowl participant)
- Pasadena City College Tournament of Roses Honor Band
- Pickerington Central (Ohio) Marching Tiger Band
- Salvation Army Tournament of Roses Band
- Soddy Daisy High School (Tennessee) Marching Band
- South Kitsap High School (Washington)
- United States Marine Corps West Coast Composite Band
- George Walton Comprehensive High School (Georgia)
- Webb City High School (Missouri)

=== 2011 ===
- Albertville High School (Alabama) Aggie Band
- All-Birdville Independent School District Band (Texas), Including the Richland High School Rebel Marching Band, the Pride of Haltom High School Buffalo Band, and the Birdville High School Mighty Hawk Band.
- Banda Musical Delfines, Xalapa, Veracruz, Mexico
- CDF Firefighters Honor Guard Pipes & Drums, Sacramento, California
- Central Carroll High School Marching Pride (Carrollton, Georgia)
- Downingtown High School (Pennsylvania) Blue & Gold Marching Band
- Lindbergh High School's Spirit of St. Louis Marching Band
- Londonderry High School Marching Band and Colorguard (New Hampshire)
- LAUSD All District High School Honor Band
- North Carolina Central University (NCCU) Sound Machine
- North Japan Honor Green Band, Japan
- Owasso High School Pride of Owasso Band, Owasso, Oklahoma
- Pasadena City College Tournament of Roses Honor Band and Herald Trumpets
- The Salvation Army Tournament of Roses Band
- Southwest DeKalb High School Marching Panthers
- Texas Christian University Marching Band (Rose Bowl participant)
- University of Wisconsin Marching Band (Rose Bowl participant)
- Upland High School (California) Highland Regiment
- U.S. Marine Corps West Coast Composite Band
- Western Carolina University Pride of the Mountains Marching Band
- Wyoming High School All State Marching Band

=== 2012 (123rd) ===
- American Fork High School Marching Band, American Fork, Utah
- Santiago High School Marching Band and Color Guard, Corona, California
- Arcadia High School Apache Marching Band and Color Guard, Arcadia, California
- Avon (High School) Marching Black & Gold, Avon, Indiana
- Banda Escolar de Guayanilla (Guayanilla, Puerto Rico)
- Needham B. Broughton High School Band, Raleigh, North Carolina
- Calgary Stampede Showband (Calgary, Alberta, Canada)
- Crestview High School 'The Big Red Machine' Band, Crestview, Florida
- Ben Davis High School Marching Giants Band, Indianapolis, Indiana
- Franklin Regional High School Marching Band, Murrysville, Pennsylvania
- Kyoto Tachibana High School – Kyoto Tachibana High School Green Band, Kyoto, Japan
- LAUSD All District High School Honor Band, Los Angeles, California
- All Lubbock ISD High School Marching Band (Lubbock High School, Monterey High School, Coronado High School and Estacado High School), Lubbock, Texas
- Mercer Island High School Marching Band, Mercer Island, Washington
- University of Oregon Marching Band, Eugene, Oregon (Rose Bowl participant)
- Pasadena City College Tournament of Roses Honor Band and Herald Trumpets, Pasadena, California
- Pulaski High School Red Raider Marching Band, Pulaski, Wisconsin
- The Royal Swedish Navy Cadet Band, Karlskrona, Sweden
- Salvation Army Tournament of Roses Band
- Siloam Springs High School Band, Siloam Springs, Arkansas
- United States Marine Corps West Coast Composite Band
- University of Wisconsin Marching Band, Madison, Wisconsin (Rose Bowl participant)

=== 2013 (124th) ===
- Aguiluchos Marching Band, Puebla, Mexico
- Bands of America Honor Band, Indianapolis, Indiana
- Broken Arrow High School, Pride of Broken Arrow Marching Band, Broken Arrow, Oklahoma
- Davis High School Marching Band, Kaysville, Utah
- Green Band Association, All Izumo Honor Green Band – Izumo, Japan
- Jackson Memorial High School Jaguar Marching Band, Jackson, New Jersey
- Lafayette High School Marching Band, Lexington, Kentucky
- Lassiter High School Marching Band, Marietta, Georgia
- Lincoln High School, Sioux Falls, South Dakota
- LAUSD All District High School Honor Band, Los Angeles, California
- MOC-Floyd Valley High School Pride of the Dutchmen Marching Band, Orange City, Iowa
- Morgantown High School Red & Blue Marching Band, Morgantown, West Virginia
- Pacific American Volunteer Association (PAVA) – Yi Dynasty, Los Angeles, California
- Pasadena City College Tournament of Roses Honor Band and Herald Trumpets, Pasadena, California
- Peace Band of our Angels of El Salvador, San Salvador, El Salvador
- Roots of Music Marching Crusaders, New Orleans, Louisiana
- Salvation Army Tournament of Roses Band, Los Angeles, California
- Santiago High School The BOSS (Bands of Santiago Sharks), Corona, California
- Seminole High School Seminole Warhawk Marching Band, Seminole, Florida
- Leland Stanford Junior University Marching Band, Stanford, California (Rose Bowl participant)
- U.S. Marine Corps West Coast Composite Band
- Valley Christian High School East-West Fusion All-Star Band (with No. 57 School from Beijing), San Jose, California and Beijing, China
- University of Wisconsin Marching Band, Madison, Wisconsin (Rose Bowl participant)

=== 2014 (125th) ===
- Banda de Música Herberto López Colegio José Daniel Crespo, Herrera, Panama
- Carmel High School "Marching Greyhounds", Carmel, Indiana
- Colony High School Knights Marching Band "THEE Northern Sound", Palmer, Alaska
- Dobyns-Bennett High School Marching Indian Band, Kingsport, Tennessee
- Glendora High School Tartan Band and Pageantry, Glendora, California
- Hawaii All State Marching Band "Na Koa Ali'i", Kaneohe, Hawaii
- Homewood High School Patriot Marching Band, Homewood, Alabama
- Claudia Taylor "Lady Bird" Johnson High School Marching Band, San Antonio, Texas
- Liberty High School Grenadier Band, Bethlehem, Pennsylvania
- LAUSD All District High School Honor Band, Los Angeles, California
- McQueen High School "Lancer Band", Reno, Nevada
- Michigan State University Spartan Marching Band, East Lansing, Michigan (Rose Bowl participant)
- Nagoya Minami High School Green Band, Nagoya, Japan
- Pasadena City College Tournament of Roses Honor Band and Herald Trumpets, Pasadena, California (85th Rose Parade appearance in 2014)
- St. Augustine High School Marching "100", New Orleans, Louisiana
- The Salvation Army Tournament of Roses Band, Los Angeles, California (95th year of participation in 2014)
- Leland Stanford Junior University Marching Band, Stanford, California (Rose Bowl participant)
- Rosemount High School Marching Band, Rosemount, Minnesota
- United States Marine Corps West Coast Composite Band
- Westfield High School Marching Bulldogs, Chantilly, Virginia

=== 2015 (126th) ===
- Blue Springs High School Golden Regiment Marching Band, Blue Springs, Missouri
- Cavalcade of Bands Honor Band, Mid-Atlantic Region
- Cypress High School Marching Band, Centurion Imperial Brigade, Cypress, California
- Escuela Secundaria General #5, Manuel R. Gutierrez – Banda Musical Delfines, Veracruz, Mexico
- Florida State University Marching Chiefs, Tallahassee, Florida (Rose Bowl–CFP participant)
- Helsingor Pipegarde – Elsinore Girls Marching Band, Denmark
- Koriyama Honor Green Band, Koriyama, Japan
- Robert E. Lee High School Mighty Rebel Band, Midland, Texas
- Lakota West High School Marching Firebirds, West Chester, Ohio
- Legacy High School Lightning Marching Band, Broomfield, Colorado
- LAUSD All District High School Honor Band, Los Angeles, California
- Maui High School's "Saber" Marching Band and Color Guard, Kahului, Hawaii
- O'Fallon Township High School Marching Panthers O'Fallon, Illinois
- University of Oregon Marching Band, Eugene, Oregon (Rose Bowl–CFP participant)
- Pasadena City College Tournament of Roses Honor Band and Herald Trumpets, Pasadena, California
- Round Rock High School Dragon Band, Round Rock, Texas
- The Salvation Army Tournament of Roses Band, Los Angeles, California
- Temple City High School Marching Band, The Pride of Temple City, Temple City, California
- United States Marine Corps West Coast Composite Band
- Walton High School – Marching Raider Band, Marietta, Georgia

=== 2016 (127th) ===
- Albany State University Marching Rams, Albany, Georgia
- Allen High School, The Allen Eagle Escadrille, Allen, Texas
- Centro Escolar José Maria Morelos y Pavón, Aguilas Doradas Marching Band, Puebla, Mexico
- Etiwanda High School, Etiwanda High School, Marching Eagle Regiment Rancho Cucamonga, California
- Franklin Regional High School Panther Band, Murrysville, Pennsylvania
- University of Iowa Hawkeye Marching Band, Iowa City, Iowa (Rose Bowl participant)
- Instituto Pedro Molina, Latin Band Pedro Molina, Coatepeque, Guatemala (unable to participate)
- Jenks High School Trojan Pride, Jenks, Oklahoma
- LAUSD All District High School Honor Band, Los Angeles, California
- Mira Mesa High School Sapphire Sound and Color Guard, San Diego, California
- Pasadena City College Tournament of Roses Honor Band and Herald Trumpets, Pasadena, California
- Plymouth-Canton Educational Park Marching Band, Canton, Michigan
- Punahou School, Punahou Marching Band, Honolulu, Hawaii
- Saratoga High School Marching Band and Color Guard, Saratoga, California
- The Salvation Army Tournament of Roses Band, Los Angeles, California
- Leland Stanford Junior University Marching Band, Stanford, California (Rose Bowl participant)
- Toho High School Dragon Band, Nagoya, Japan
- United States Marine Corps West Coast Composite Band, San Diego, California
- Virginia Military Institute Regimental Band and Pipe Band, Lexington, Virginia
- William Mason High School Marching Band, Mason, Ohio
- Wyoming All-State Marching Band, Cheyenne, Wyoming

=== 2017 (128th) ===
- Arcadia High School, Arcadia, California
- Bands of America Honor Band, USA
- Broken Arrow High School, The Pride of Broken Arrow, Oklahoma
- Buhos Marching Band, Xalapa, Veracruz, Mexico
- Foothill High School, Henderson, Nevada
- Gifusho Green Band, Gifu, Japan
- Grove City High School, Ohio
- Marching Pride of Lawrence Township, Indianapolis, Indiana
- LAUSD All District High School Honor Band, Los Angeles, California
- Martin Luther King, Jr. High School, MLK "Kings of Halftime," Lithonia, Georgia
- Niceville High School, Florida
- Ooltewah High School, Tennessee
- Pasadena City College Tournament of Roses Honor Band and Herald Trumpets, Pasadena, California
- Penn State University Marching Blue Band, State College, Pennsylvania (Rose Bowl participant)
- Pulaski High School, Red Raider Marching Band, Wisconsin
- The Salvation Army Tournament of Roses Band, Los Angeles, California
- Santa Clara Vanguard Drum and Bugle Corps, Santa Clara, California
- United States Marine Corps, West Coast Composite Band, San Diego, California
- United States Air Force Band, Washington, DC
- University of Southern California Trojan Marching Band, Los Angeles, California (Rose Bowl participant)
- Westlake High School, Austin, Texas

=== 2018 (129th) ===
List of bands in the 2018 Rose Parade:

- Air Academy High School – Air Academy High School Marching Band, USAF Academy, CO
- Albertville High School – Albertville High School "Aggie" Marching Band, Albertville, Alabama
- Australia's Marching Koalas, Dangar, New South Wales, Australia
- Banda De Música Herberto López – Colegio José Daniel Crespo, Chitré, Herrera, Panama
- Burlington Teen Tour Band, Burlington, Ontario, Canada
- Georgia Redcoat Marching Band, Athens, Georgia (Rose Bowl–CFP participant)
- Homestead High School – Homestead High School Mighty Mustang Marching Band, Cupertino, CA
- Kyoto Tachibana High School – Kyoto Tachibana High School Green Band, Kyoto, Japan
- LAUSD All District High School Honor Band, Los Angeles, California
- Lindbergh High School Spirit of Saint Louis Marching Band, St. Louis, Missouri
- Londonderry High School Marching Lancer Band, Londonderry, New Hampshire
- Louisburg High School Marching Wildcat Band, Louisburg, Kansas
- Pasadena City College Tournament of Roses Honor Band & Herald Trumpets, Pasadena, California
- Pennsbury High School "Long Orange Line" Marching Band, Fairless Hills, Pennsylvania
- The Pride of Oklahoma Marching Band, Norman, Oklahoma (Rose Bowl–CFP participant)
- Ronald Reagan High School Marching Band, San Antonio, Texas
- The Salvation Army Tournament of Roses Band, Los Angeles, California
- Santiago High School The BOSS (Bands of Santiago Sharks), Corona, California
- "The Commandant's Own" The United States Marine Drum & Bugle Corps, Washington, DC
- United States Marine Corps West Coast Composite Band, MCAS Miramar, MCRD San Diego and Camp Pendleton, CA
- University of Massachusetts Minuteman Marching Band, Massachusetts
- Westlake High School Marching Thunder, Saratoga Springs, Utah

=== 2019 (130th) ===
List of bands in the 2019 Rose Parade:

- Alabama State University Mighty Marching Hornets Montgomery, AL
- All-Izumo Honor Green Band, Izumo, Japan
- Banda Escolar de Guayanilla Puerto Rico, Guayanilla, Puerto Rico
- Banda Municipal de Acosta, Acosta, San José, Costa Rica
- Calgary Stampede Showband, Calgary, Alberta, Canada
- Cavalcade of Bands Honor Band, Mid-Atlantic Region
- Florida A&M University, The Incomparable Marching "100", Tallahassee, Florida
- Flower Mound High School Band, Flower Mound, TX
- Henry J. Kaiser High School Kaiser Catamount Pride Band & Color Guard, Fontana, California (Pre-parade)
- Lincoln-Way Marching Band, Frankfort, IL
- Los Angeles Unified School District – All District High School Honor Band, Los Angeles, CA
- Mercer Island High School Marching Band, Mercer Island, WA
- Munford High School Band, Munford, TN
- Na Koa Ali'I – Hawai'i All-State Marching Band, Kaneohe, HI
- The Ohio State University Marching Band, Columbus, OH (Rose Bowl Participant)
- Pacific Crest Drum and Bugle Corps, Diamond Bar, CA
- Pasadena City College Tournament of Roses Honor Band & Herald Trumpets, Pasadena, CA
- Pickerington Marching Bands, Pickerington High School North and Pickerington High School Central, Pickerington, OH
- Royal Swedish Cadet Band, Karlskrona, Sweden
- The Lassiter High School Marching Trojan Band, Marietta, Georgia
- The Salvation Army Tournament of Roses Band, Long Beach, CA
- United States Marine Corps West Coast Composite Band, San Diego, CA
- University of Washington Husky Marching Band, Seattle, WA (Rose Bowl Participant)

=== 2020 (131st) ===
List of bands in the 2020 Rose Parade:

- Aguiluchos Marching Band (Puebla, Mexico)
- Alhambra Unified School District High School Band, Alhambra, CA
- Baldwinsville Central School District Marching Bees, Baldwinsville, NY
- Banda El Salvador: Grande Como Su Gente (El Salvador)
- Banda Municipal de Zarcero (Alajuela, Costa Rica)
- Centenaria Banda Colegial – University of Puerto Rico (Mayaguez, Puerto Rico)
- Dobyns-Bennett High School Marching Band, Kingsport, TN
- Greendale High School, Greendale, WI
- Helsingør Pigegarde (Hornbaek, Denmark)
- Japan Honor Green Band (Kyoto, Japan)
- Kamehameha Schools Kapalama Warrior Marching Band & Color Guard, Honolulu, HI
- Los Angeles Unified School District – All District High School Honor Band, Los Angeles, CA
- Oregon Marching Band, Eugene, Oregon (Rose Bowl participant)
- The Pride of Owasso, Owasso, OK
- The Pride of Pearland Marching Band, Pearland, TX
- Pasadena City College Tournament of Roses Honor Band & Herald Trumpets, Pasadena, CA
- Rancho Verde High School Crimson Regiment, Moreno Valley, CA
- The Salvation Army Tournament of Roses Band, Long Beach, CA
- Southern University "Human Jukebox" Marching Band, Baton Rouge, LA
- United States Marine Corps West Coast Composite Band, San Diego, CA
- West Harrison High School Hurricane Band, The Pride of South Mississippi, Gulfport, MS
- University of Wisconsin Marching Band, Madison, Wisconsin (Rose Bowl participant)

=== 2021 (132nd) ===
Parade cancelled due to the COVID-19 pandemic. The bands selected for the 2021 parade were invited to march on January 1, 2022.

=== 2022 (133rd) ===
List of bands in the 2022 Rose Parade:

- Arcadia High School Apache Marching Band and Color Guard, Arcadia, CA
- Bands of America Honor Band, Music for All, Indianapolis, IN
- The Band Directors Marching Band, Pickerington, Ohio
- Broken Arrow High School, The Pride of Broken Arrow, Oklahoma (revoked attendance)
- Downingtown High School Blue and Gold Marching Band, Downingtown, PA
- Georgia State University Panther Band, Atlanta, GA
- Gibson County Tennessee Mass Band, Dyer, TN
- Hebron High School Mighty Hawk Band, Carrollton, Texas
- Homewood High School Patriot Band, Homewood, AL
- Los Angeles Unified School District – All District High School Honor Band, Los Angeles, CA
- The Mira Mesa High School "Sapphire Sound" Marching Band and Color Guard, San Diego, CA
- Ohio State University Marching Band, Columbus, Ohio (Rose Bowl participant)
- O'Fallon Township High School Marching Panthers, O'Fallon, IL
- Pasadena City College Tournament of Roses Honor Band & Herald Trumpets, Pasadena, CA
- The Salvation Army Tournament of Roses Band, Los Angeles, CA
- Tennessee State University Aristocrat of Bands, Nashville, TN
- University of Utah Marching Band, Salt Lake City, UT (Rose Bowl participant)
- United States Marine Corps West Coast Composite Band, San Diego and Camp Pendleton, CA
- The Waukee Warrior Regiment, Waukee, IA

=== 2023 (134th, Monday January 2, 2023) ===
Due to travel restrictions in 2021, international bands are invited to participate in the 2023 Rose Parade instead of the 2022 Rose Parade.

List of bands in the 2023 Rose Parade:

- All Gifu Honor Green Band, Gifu, Japan
- Banda de Musica La Primavera, Santiago de Veraguas, Panama
- Brookwood High School Marching Band, Snellville, GA
- Buhos Marching Band, Veracruz, Mexico
- Catalina Foothills High School Marching Band Falcon Marching Band, Tucson, AZ
- Fresno State University Bulldog Marching Band, Fresno, CA
- Los Angeles Unified School District – All District High School Honor Band, Los Angeles, CA
- Northwoods Marching Band, featuring Antigo, DC Everest, Lakeland Union, Merill, Mosinee, Northland Pines, Three Lakes, and Wausau East high schools, Northern Wisconsin
- Norfolk State University Spartan Legion Marching Band, Norfolk, VA
- Pasadena City College Tournament of Roses Honor Band & Herald Trumpets, Pasadena, CA
- Pella Community School District's Pella Marching Dutch Band, Pella, Iowa
- Rockford High School Marching Band, Rockford, MI
- Rosemount High School Marching Band, Rosemount, MN
- Salvation Army Tournament of Roses Band, Los Angeles, CA
- Taipei First Girls High School Marching Band, Honor Guard and Color Guard, Taipei, Taiwan, Republic of China
- Triuggio Marching Band Triuggio, Monza, and Brianza, Italy
- United States Marine Corps West Coast Composite Band, San Diego and Camp Pendleton, CA
- Vista Ridge High School Marching Band, Cedar Park, TX
- Penn State University Marching Blue Band, State College, Pennsylvania (Rose Bowl participant)
- University of Utah Marching Band, Salt Lake City, UT (Rose Bowl participant)

=== 2024 (135th) ===
List of bands in the 2024 Rose Parade:

- Albertville High School Aggie Marching Band, Albertville, Alabama
- Banda Municipal de Zarcero, Zarcero, Costa Rica
- John H. Castle High School Marching Knights, Newburgh, Indiana
- Jenks High School Trojan Pride Marching Band, Jenks, Oklahoma
- Niceville High School Eagle Pride Band, Niceville, Florida
- North Carolina A&T State University Blue and Gold Marching Machine, Greensboro, North Carolina
- Los Angeles Unified School District – All District High School Honor Band, Los Angeles, CA
- William Mason High School Marching Band, Mason, Ohio
- The University of Alabama Million Dollar Band, Tuscaloosa, Alabama (Rose Bowl–CFP participant)
- The Na Koa Ali'i – Hawaii All State Marching Band, Kailua, Hawaii
- Pasadena City College Tournament of Roses Honor Band & Herald Trumpets, Pasadena, CA
- Pipes On Parade: The Massed Pipes & Drums (Twentynine Palms, CA)
- Pulaski High School Red Raider Marching Band, Pulaski, Wisconsin
- Salvation Army Tournament of Roses Band, Los Angeles, CA
- Santiago High School The BOSS (Bands of Santiago Sharks), Corona, California
- Tōhō High School Green Band (TMB), Nagoya, Aichi Prefecture, Japan
- The West Chester University Golden Rams Marching Band, West Chester, PA
- United States Marine Corps West Coast Composite Band (San Diego, CA)
- University of Michigan Marching Band, Ann Arbor, Michigan (Rose Bowl–CFP participant)
- Westlake High School Chaparral Band (Austin, TX)

=== 2025 (136th) ===
List of bands in the 2025 Rose Parade:

- 605 All Star Band, featuring Artesia, Bellflower, Cerritos, Gahr, John Glenn, La Mirada, Mayfair, and Norwalk high schools, Southern California
- All Star Marching Band Mexico, Puebla, Mexico
- Banda de Música Herberto López Colegio José Daniel Crespo, Herrera, Panama
- The Fresno State University Bulldog Marching Band, Fresno, CA
- Helsingør Pigegarde (Elsinore Girls Marching Band), Helsingør, Denmark
- Homestead High School Mighty Mustang Marching Band and Color Guard, Cupertino, California
- The Jackson State University "The Sonic Boom of the South", Jackson, Mississippi
- Kyoto Tachibana High School – Kyoto Tachibana High School Green Band, Kyoto, Japan
- The Lincoln-Way Marching Band, Frankfort, Illinois
- Los Angeles Unified School District – All District High School Honor Band, Los Angeles, CA
- The New England Honors Marching Band, from Massachusetts, Connecticut, Rhode Island, Vermont, New Hampshire, Maine
- The Ohio State University Marching Band (Rose Bowl-CFP participant)
- Pasadena City College Tournament of Roses Honor Band & Herald Trumpets, Pasadena, CA
- Pebble Hills High School Spartan Marching Band, El Paso, Texas
- Rancho Verde High School Crimson Regiment, Moreno Valley, CA
- Salesians of Don Bosco High School Marching Band, Rosemead, Bellflower, Boyle Heights/Los Southern California
- The Salvation Army Tournament of Roses Band, Los Angeles, CA
- Seminole High School Warhawk Marching Band, Seminole, FL
- University of Wyoming Western Thunder Marching Band, Laramie, WY
- United States Marine Corps West Coast Composite Band, San Diego and Camp Pendleton, CA
- University of Oregon Marching Band (Rose Bowl–CFP participant)

=== 2026 (137th) ===
- Allen High School Eagle Escadrille, Allen, Texas
- Arcadia High School Apache Marching Band and Color Guard, Arcadia, CA
- Bands of America Honor Band, Indianapolis, Indiana
- The Band Directors Marching Band, Pickerington, Ohio
- Brownsburg High School Marching Band, Brownsburg, Indiana
- Clover High School Marching Band, Clover, South Carolina
- Colony High School Marching Band, Ontario California
- Delfines Marching Band, Xalapa, Veracruz, Mexico
- Franklin High School (Tennessee) Marching Band, Franklin, Tennessee
- Glendora High School Tartan Band and Pageantry, Glendora, CA
- Greendale High School Marching Band, Greendale, Wisconsin
- Homewood High School Patriot Band, Homewood, AL
- Los Angeles Unified School District – All District High School Honor Band, Los Angeles, CA
- Mino Jiyu Gakuen Golden Bears Green Band – Toyonaka, Osaka, Japan
- Morgan State University Magnificent Marching Machine, Baltimore, Maryland
- Pasadena City College Herald Trumpets, Pasadena, California
- Pasadena City College Tournament of Roses Honor Band & Herald Trumpets, Pasadena, CA
- The Salvation Army Tournament of Roses Band, Maryland and Virginia
- United States Marine Corps West Coast Composite Band, Camp Pendleton, CA
- Indiana University Marching Hundred, Bloomington, Indiana (Rose Bowl–CFP Participant)
- The University of Alabama Million Dollar Band, Tuscaloosa, Alabama (Rose Bowl–CFP participant)

=== 2027 (138th) ===
- Aguiluchos Marching Band, Puebla, Mexico
- Asahi University and Gifu Shogyo High School, Gifu, Japan
- Banda CEDES Don Bosco, Alajuelita, San Jose, Costa Rica
- Blue Springs High School Golden Regiment Band, Blue Springs, MO
- Carmel High School Marching Greyhounds, Carmel, IN
- Falcon Marching Band, Bowling Green State University, Bowling Green, Ohio
- Los Angeles Unified School District – All District High School Honor Band, Los Angeles, CA
- Pasadena City College Tournament of Roses Honor Band & Herald Trumpets, Pasadena, CA
- Pasadena Unified School District All-Star Band, Pasadena, CA
- Pride Bands Alliance, Washington, D.C.
- Rosemount High School Marching Band, Rosemount, Minnesota
- Santa Clara Vanguard Drum & Bugle Corps, Santa Clara, California
- The Clovis High School Marching Band, Clovis, California
- The Marching Southerners, Jacksonville State University, Jacksonville, Alabama
- Salvation Army Tournament of Roses Band, Los Angeles, CA
- San Dimas High School, Marching Band, San Dimas, CA
- Timber Creek High School, Fort Worth, Texas
- United States Marine Corps West Coast Composite Band, San Diego and Camp Pendleton, CA
- Bands from the Universities participating in the Rose Bowl game

=== 2028 (139th) ===
- Albertville High School Aggie Band, Albertville, Alabama
- Anaheim High School Colonist Band & Pageantry, Anaheim, CA
- Banda Municipal de Zarcero, Zarcero, Costa Rica
- The Fishers High School Marching Tiger Band, Fishers, Indiana
- Los Angeles Unified School District – All District High School Honor Band, Los Angeles, CA
- Pasadena City College Tournament of Roses Honor Band & Herald Trumpets, Pasadena, CA
- Salvation Army Tournament of Roses Band, Los Angeles, CA
- Santiago High School The BOSS (Bands of Santiago Sharks), Corona, California
- Bands from the Universities participating in the Rose Bowl game

=== HBCU style bands ===
- Alabama A&M University Marching Band (2006)
- Alabama State University Marching Band (2019)
- Albany State University Marching Band (2016)
- Florida A&M University Marching Band (2019)
- Jackson State University Marching Band (2025)
- Morgan State University Marching Band (2026)
- Mississippi Valley State College (1965, 1968)
- Morris Brown College Marching Band (1971, 1995)
- Norfolk State University Marching Band (2023)
- North Carolina A&T State University Marching Band (2024)
- North Carolina Central University Marching Band (2011)
- Prairie View A&M University Marching Band (2009)
- Southern University Marching Band (1980, 2020)
- Tennessee State University Marching Band (2022)

=== Non Rose Bowl-affiliated university marching bands ===
- Alabama A&M University Marching Band (2006)
- Alabama State University Marching Band (2019)
- Albany State University Marching Band (2016)
- California State University Marching Band (1977)
- Centenaria Banda Colegial – University of Puerto Rico (2020)
- Florida A&M University Marching Band (2019)
- Fresno State University Bulldog Marching Band (2023, 2025)
- Georgia State University Marching Band (2022)
- Jackson State University Marching Band (2025)
- Loyola University Marching Band (1938)
- Mississippi Valley State College (1965, 1968)
- Missouri State University Pride Marching Band (2008)
- Morgan State University Marching Band (2026)
- Morris Brown College Marching Band (1971, 1995)
- Norfolk State University Spartan Legion Marching Band (2023)
- North Carolina A&T State University Marching Band (2024)
- North Carolina Central University Marching Band (2011)
- Prairie View A&M University Marching Band (2009)
- San Jose State University Marching Band (1981)
- South Dakota State University Marching Band (2003, 2008)
- Southwest Missouri State University Marching Band (1995)
- Southern University Marching Band (1980, 2020)
- Tennessee State University Marching Band (2022)
- University of Massachusetts Marching Band (2018)
- University of Wyoming Marching Band (2025)
- Western Carolina University Marching Band (2011)
- The West Chester University Marching Band (2024)

=== Rose Bowl affiliated university marching bands – listed by number of appearances (since 1948) ===
- University of Southern California Trojan Marching Band, Los Angeles, California (Rose Bowl participant) x26
- University of Michigan Marching Band x20
- The Ohio State University Marching Band x16
- University of California, Los Angeles Marching Band x11 as Rose Bowl Participant, x5 parade only
- University of Washington Marching Band x11
- University of Wisconsin Marching Band x10
- Leland Stanford Junior University Marching Band x8
- University of Iowa Marching Band x6
- Michigan State University Marching Band x5
- University of Oregon Marching Band x6
- Penn State University Marching Band x4
- University of California, Berkeley Marching Band x4
- University of Illinois Marching Band x4
- University of Alabama Marching Band x3
- Arizona State University Marching Band x2
- Northwestern University Marching Band x2
- Oregon State University Marching Band x2
- Purdue University Marching Band x2
- Indiana University Marching Band x2
- University of Minnesota Marching Band x2
- University of Nebraska Marching Band x2
- University of Oklahoma Marching Band x2
- University of Texas Marching Band x2
- University of Utah Marching Band x2
- Washington State University Marching Band x2
- Florida State University Marching Band x1
- Texas Christian University Marching Band x1
- University of Georgia Marching Band x1
- University of Miami Marching Band x1

=== Top high school marching bands (non-honor band affiliated) listed by number of appearances (since 1948) ===
- Arcadia High School Marching Band x18
- Mount Miguel High School Marching Band x11
- Glendora High School Marching Band x9
- Alhambra High School Marching Band x8
- Ben Davis High School Marching Band x7
- Blue Springs High School Marching Band x7
- Lincoln High School Marching Band x7
- Mark Keppel High School Marching Band x7
- Foothill High School Marching Band x6
- Homewood High School Marching Band x6
- Owasso High School Marching Band x6
- Porterville High School Marching Band x6
- Alexis I. DuPont High School Marching Band x5
- Glendale School Marching Band x5
- Lakewood High School Marching Band x5
- Lassiter High School Marching Band x5
- Londonderry High School Marching Band x5
- Pearl City High School Marching Band x5
- Poway High School Marching Band x5
- West High School Marching Band (Torrance) x4
