= Santiago High School (Corona, California) =

Public high school in California, United States

Location
- 1395 Foothill Parkway; Corona, Riverside County, California 92881; United States; 33°50′7″N 117°32′49″W

Information
- Type: Public
- Motto: Home of Scholars, Achievers, and Champions
- Established: 1995
- School district: Corona-Norco Unified School District
- Principal: Kenny Torres
- Grades: 9-12
- Enrollment: 3,517 (2023-2024)
- Colors: Teal; Black; White
- Nickname: Sharks
- Rival: Centennial High School
- Newspaper: Shark Attack
- Yearbook: El Tiburón
- Feeder schools: Citrus Hills Intermediate School El Cerrito Middle School
- Website: santiago.cnusd.k12.ca.us

Santiago High School, or Corona Santiago, is a public high school located in Corona, California, United States. It is a California Distinguished School and is one of eight high schools in the Corona-Norco Unified School District, serving grades 9 through 12.

== History ==
Santiago High School was opened on September 5, 1995, in Corona, California. The school was located on South Main Street until its current campus on Foothill Parkway was built and opened in 1999 to accommodate a growing student population. The former South Main Street campus was later converted into Citrus Hills Intermediate School, which was established the same year.

== Performing arts ==
Santiago High School offers several acclaimed performing arts programs for students to participate in, some of which include a theater program, a choir program, an instrumental music program, and an AP Music Theory class.

=== Instrumental music program ===
Santiago is home to an award-winning instrumental music program known as the BOSS (Bands and Orchestras of Santiago Sharks). It consists of four large concert bands, 3 string orchestras, 3 jazz ensembles, a marching band and drumline, and a championship color guard.

The BOSS is a four-time participant of the Tournament of Roses Parade in Pasadena, California, having marched in 2013, 2018, and 2024, and will be in the 2028 parade. The group also competes at several SCSBOA parade band reviews and band festivals each year. The BOSS won band sweepstakes at the Arcadia High School Festival of Bands during the 2024 SCSBOA parade band competition season.

== Notable alumni ==
- Mitchell Agude, NFL Linebacker for the Detroit Lions
- Blake Barnett, former college football player
- Chris Benard, track and field athlete
- Monique Billings, WNBA basketball player
- Tony Dye, football coach and former NFL free safety
- Tyler Hoechlin, actor, known for roles in Teen Wolf and Superman & Lois
- Chance Sisco, MLB baseball player
- Brice Turang, MLB baseball player
- Aaron Wise, professional golfer on the PGA Tour
- Jacob Wohl, far-right conspiracy theorist and fraudster
- Ethan Zubak, MLS soccer player
