= Homewood High School =

Location
- 1901 S. Lakeshore Drive; Homewood, Alabama 35209; United States; 33°27′39″N 86°47′25″W

Information
- School type: Public, high school
- Founded: 1972 (54 years ago)
- School board: Homewood Board of Education
- School district: Homewood City School District
- Superintendent: Justin Hefner
- CEEB code: 011464
- Principal: Joel Henneke
- Teaching staff: 110.90 (FTE)
- Grades: 9-12
- Enrollment: 1,333 (2024-2025)
- Student to teacher ratio: 12.02
- Language: English
- Campus: Suburban
- Colors: Red, white, and blue
- Mascot: Patriot
- Team name: Homewood Patriots
- Newspaper: The Homewood Tricorne
- Yearbook: Heritage
- Website: hhs.homewood.k12.al.us

Homewood High School (HHS) is a public high school serving grades nine through twelve in Homewood, a suburb of Birmingham, Alabama. It is the only high school within the Homewood City School System, and Joel Henneke currently serves as principal. In the summer of 2007, the school’s facade was remodeled and Pathways Alternative School was constructed on the upper level of the student parking lot. The front exterior and interior of the office and lobby were also reconstructed in the summer of 2008. The construction of a new fine arts wing began in the summer of 2018.

Homewood's colors are red, white, and blue and all competitive teams are known as the Patriots. The Homewood Patriots compete in AHSAA Class 6A.

== Academics ==
The graduating class of 2009 had 236 students, with 206 students taking at least 1 AP exam. As a whole, the class of 2009 took 475 AP exams. The AP exam "pass score" of 3 or higher was 74.9% in 2009. The SAT Critical Reading mean was 572 and the Math mean was 568. The average ACT composite score was 22.8. There were 3 National Merit Finalists, 1 National Achievement Finalist, and 7 National Merit Commended students in 2009.

== Extracurricular activities ==
=== Athletics ===
Homewood High School fields varsity teams in football, cheerleading, basketball, baseball, soccer, wrestling, golf, tennis, softball, volleyball, lacrosse, cross country running/track and field.The Track and Field and Cross Country teams have won 31 state championships. During the 2018–19 school year Girls’ and Boys' Cross Country, Girls’ and Boys' Indoor T&F, Girls' and Boys’ T&F all won State Championships. The Homewood Boys' Soccer team has won four 5A state championships: in 2003, 2005, 2006, and 2014.

==== Waldrop Stadium ====
Waldrop Stadium, in Homewood, Alabama (Bob Newton Field) is the home of the Homewood Patriots. The field is named after former head football coach Bob Newton, who led the Patriots to their five 5A wins. The stadium is home to the football, soccer, flag football, and track and field teams.

==== Football ====
Homewood won the class 4A state championship in 1974 and the class 5A state championships in 1995, 2000, 2002, 2004, and 2005, however Homewood also lost the state championship four times; to Gadsden in 1986, Blount in 1990, Benjamin Russell in 2001, and Briarwood in 2003.

=== Patriot Marching Band ===
The Homewood High School Patriot Marching Band is a large marching ensemble made up of students from Homewood High School. Nearly half of the high school's students participate in the band program as instrumentalists, dancers, flag corps members, or as managers.

The Homewood High School Patriot Marching Band participated in the 2018 Macy's Thanksgiving Day Parade, the ninth time it has performed in the parade, more times than any school from outside of the New York area. The band also participated in the 2022 Rose Parade, in Pasadena, California. This was the fifth time that this band has performed in this parade, which is more than any other band from Alabama. Accompanying the band during their performances was the Star Spangled Girls' dance line as well as the Patriot Guard.

It has participated in many national and international events, listed below:

- United States Presidential Inaugural Parade in 2001 and 1989
- State of Alabama Inaugural Parade in 2003, 1999, 1995, 1991 and 1987
- Tournament of Roses Parade in 2026, 2022, 2014, 2009, 2003 and 1984
- Macy's Thanksgiving Day Parade in 2018, 2011, 2006, 2000, 1995, 1990, 1986, 1981 and 1978
- Fiesta Bowl Parade in 2004, 1999 and 1994
- Orange Bowl Parade in 2000
- St. Patrick's Day Parade in Dublin and Limerick, Ireland in 1997 and 1993 and 2024.
- Lord Mayor Of Westminster's New Years Day Parade in 1990
- BBVA Compass Bowl (Birmingham Bowl) in 2012
- Drum Corps International World Class Finals in 1980, 1979

== Notable alumni ==
- Chris Gray (1988), Former NFL offensive lineman
- Kevin Newsom (1990), United States Circuit Judge, Court of Appeals; Birmingham attorney and former law clerk to Justice David Souter, U.S. Supreme Court
- John Zimmerman (1992), World Champion & Olympic figure skater.
- Evan Mathis (2000), Former NFL offensive lineman
- Ronald Nored (2009), former point guard for Butler University and NBA assistant coach
- Aaron Ernest (2011), Sprinter for LSU - (HS) USA Today All-American and T&F News All-American, NCAA All-American, and World Jr. Silver Medalist in both the 100m and 200m in 2012
- Ameer Abdullah (2011), current NFL running-back signed with the Las Vegas Raiders
- Paul Rogers (2002), Academy Award winning film editor (Everything Everywhere All At Once)
