= Homewood City School District =

School district in Alabama

Homewood City Schools

Location
- Homewood, Alabama United States
- Coordinates: 33.459°N 86.807°W

District information
- Type: Public
- Grades: K-12
- Established: 1970
- Superintendent: Dr. Justin Hefner
- Schools: 5
- Budget: $46.7 million
- NCES District ID: 0101760

Students and staff
- Students: 3,907
- Teachers: 312
- Staff: 241

Other information
- Website: http://www.homewood.k12.al.us/

The Homewood City School District is the school system of the Birmingham, Alabama, suburb of Homewood. Homewood City Schools serve 3,907 students and employ 553 faculty and staff. The district includes three elementary schools, one middle school, and one high school.

== History ==
In 1970 the citizens of Homewood adopted a five mill ad valorem tax to support its own school district. The Homewood City School District was founded during the 1971-72 school year and graduated the first class out of its new building in May 1973.

== Schools ==
The Homewood City School District consists of five schools:

- Edgewood Elementary School
- Hall-Kent Elementary School
- Homewood High School
- Homewood Middle School
- Shades Cahaba Elementary School

== Student Profile ==
Homewood City Schools serve all students living within Homewood city limits. The student population is 63% white, 24% African-American, 10% Hispanic, and 3% Asian-American. Approximately 27% of students qualify for free or reduced price lunch. Six percent are English Language Learners (ELL), and 7% have Individualized Education Programs (IEPs).

Homewood City Schools have an overall graduation rate of 94%. Approximately 91% of Homewood students meet or exceed state proficiency standards in mathematics, and about 95% meet or exceed standards in reading.
