= Evan Mathis =

American football player (born 1981)

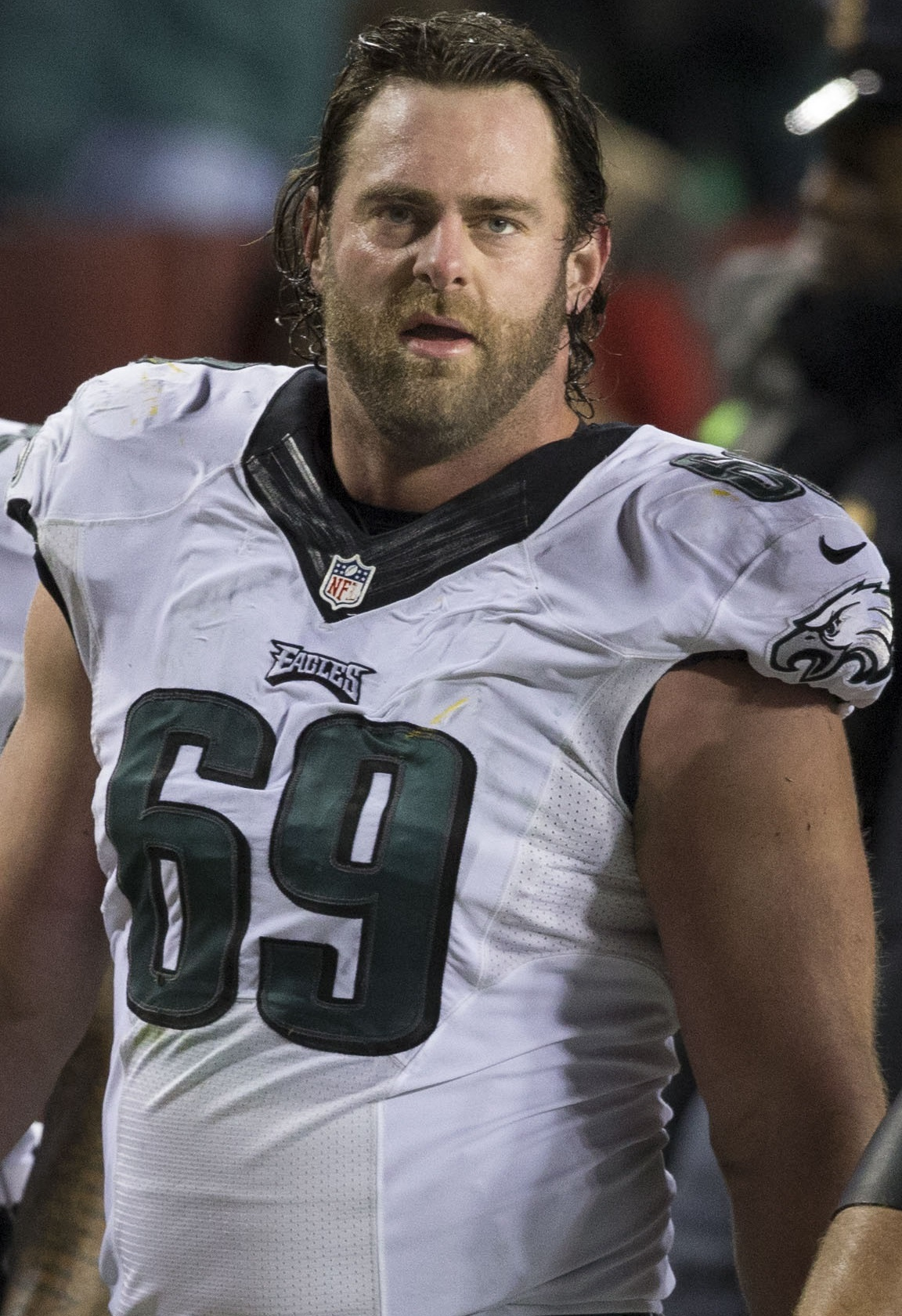
- Mathis with the Philadelphia Eagles in 2014

No. 71, 73, 66, 69
- Position: Guard

Personal information
- Born: November 1, 1981 (age 45); Birmingham, Alabama, U.S.
- Listed height: 6 ft 5 in (1.96 m)
- Listed weight: 301 lb (137 kg)

Career information
- High school: Homewood (Homewood, Alabama)
- College: Alabama (2000–2004)
- NFL draft: 2005: 3rd round, 79th overall pick

Career history
- Carolina Panthers (2005–2007); Miami Dolphins (2008); Cincinnati Bengals (2008–2010); Philadelphia Eagles (2011–2014); Denver Broncos (2015); Arizona Cardinals (2016)

Awards and highlights
- Super Bowl champion (50); First-team All-Pro (2013); 2× Pro Bowl (2013, 2014); First-team All-SEC (2004)

Career NFL statistics
- Games played: 134
- Games started: 94
- Fumble recoveries: 1
- Stats at Pro Football Reference

Evan Bradley Mathis (born November 1, 1981) is an American former professional football player who was a guard for 12 seasons in the National Football League (NFL). He played college football for the Alabama Crimson Tide, and was selected by the Carolina Panthers in the third round of the 2005 NFL draft. Mathis also played for the Miami Dolphins, Cincinnati Bengals, Philadelphia Eagles, Denver Broncos and Arizona Cardinals.

== Early life ==
Mathis graduated from Homewood High School in Homewood, Alabama, where he played football and competed in track and wrestling. He was coached by Bob Newton in football. In wrestling, Mathis won the 2000 Alabama 6A heavyweight championship. In track & field, Mathis competed in the shot put event (top-throw of 15.24 meters).

== College career ==
Although he bulked up from 240 pounds (110 kg) to 276 pounds (125 kg) after signing with Alabama in February 2000, Mathis was redshirted as a true freshman. In April 2001, he was named the Paul Crane Most Improved Offensive Lineman for Alabama along with tight end Theo Sanders. He competed with Alonzo Ephraim for the starting center job during spring practice in 2001, but lost out. Instead, he beat out Dante Ellington for the starting right tackle job, making his first start against South Carolina.

Mathis started four seasons on the offensive line for the University of Alabama Crimson Tide. His first three years he played tackle, before shifting to left guard as a senior. He started 47 consecutive games beginning in the 4th game of his redshirt freshman year. He helped anchor an offensive line that paved the way for the Crimson Tide to lead the Southeastern Conference in rushing yards per game in 2004.

== Professional career ==
Pre-draft measurables
Height	Weight	Arm length	Hand span	40-yard dash	10-yard split	20-yard split	20-yard shuttle	Three-cone drill	Vertical jump	Broad jump	Bench press
6 ft 5 1/4 in (1.96 m)	304 lb (138 kg)	32 1/2 in (0.83 m)	10 3/4 in (0.27 m)	4.92 s	1.66 s	2.87 s	4.16 s	7.39 s	35.5 in (0.90 m)	9 ft 9 in (2.97 m)	35 reps
All values from NFL Combine

=== Miami Dolphins ===
Mathis was signed by the Miami Dolphins on September 9, 2008, after Donald Thomas, their rookie starting right guard spot was put on injured reserve. The Dolphins released him November 8 after playing seven games for them.

=== Cincinnati Bengals ===
Mathis played for the Cincinnati Bengals from 2008 to 2010. He did not allow a sack during the 2009 and 2010 seasons.

=== Philadelphia Eagles ===
The Philadelphia Eagles signed Mathis to a one-year contract on July 31, 2011. Immediately after the preseason, Mathis won the starting job at left guard for the 2011 season. He signed a five-year, $25.5 million contract with the Eagles on March 17, 2012.

Pro Football Focus rated Mathis as the best guard in the NFL for the 2011, 2012, and 2013 season. In 2014, he was rated as the second best guard in the league despite missing seven games due to injury.

Mathis was named to the USA Today All-Pro Team after the 2012 season.

Ranked #6 overall in Pro Football Focus' Top 101 of 2012. In 2013, Pro Football Focus chose Mathis for its inaugural Bruce Matthews Award recognizing the NFL's best offensive lineman. He was voted First-team All-Pro in 2013 for his excellent performance with Philadelphia.

Mathis was released by the team on June 11, 2015, after he held out of OTAs in search of a new contract.

=== Denver Broncos ===
On August 25, 2015, Mathis agreed to a one-year, $2.5 million contract with the Denver Broncos. On February 7, 2016, Mathis won his first career Super Bowl when the Broncos beat his former team, the Carolina Panthers, 24–10 in Super Bowl 50.

=== Arizona Cardinals ===
Mathis signed a one-year, $6 million contract with the Arizona Cardinals on March 16, 2016. He was placed on injured reserve on October 8, 2016, after suffering an ankle injury in Week 5 against the San Francisco 49ers. Mathis announced his retirement via Twitter on January 20, 2017.

== Personal life ==
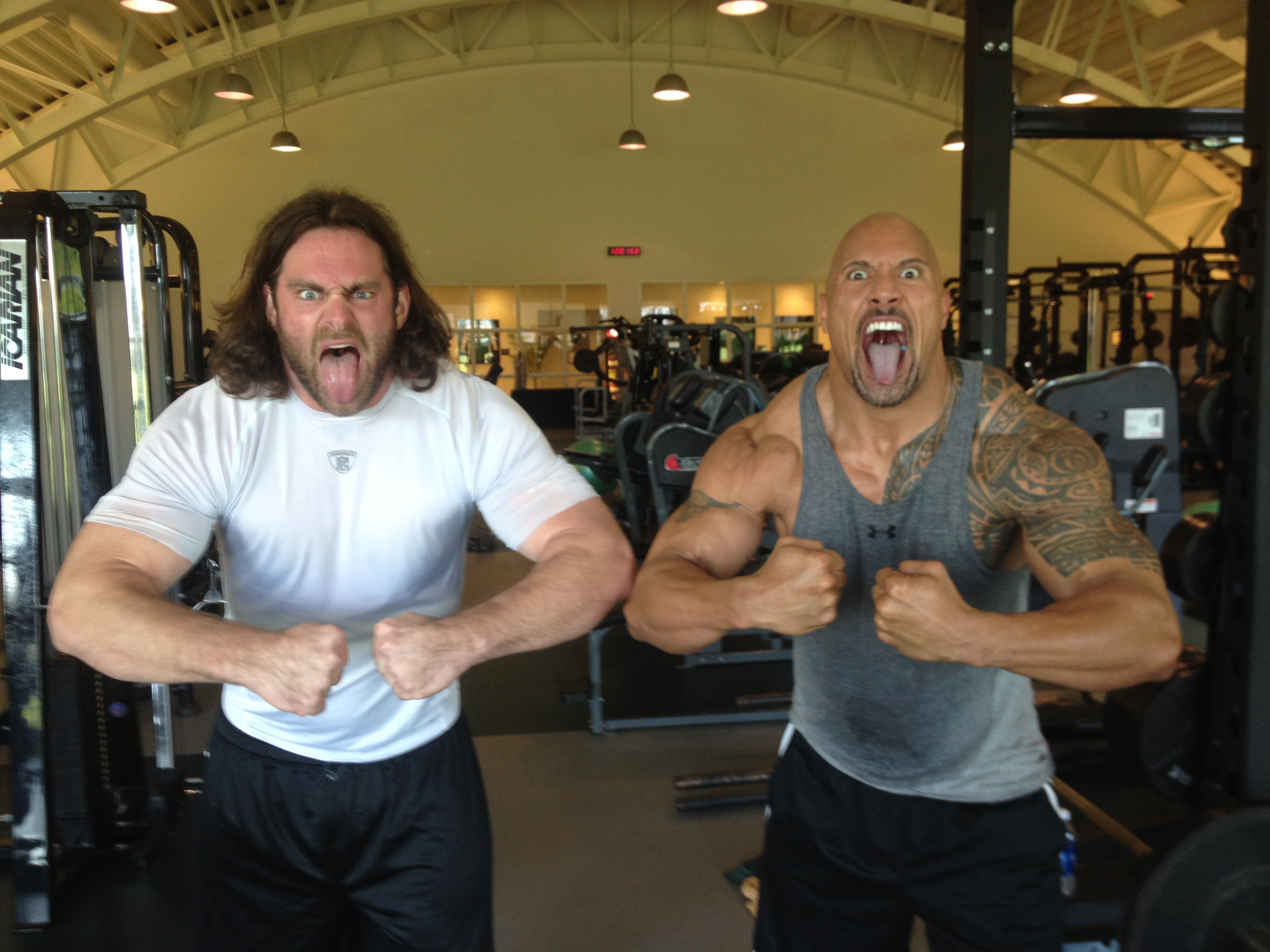
Mathis and Dwayne Johnson in 2012

Mathis's uncle is Bob Baumhower, who played defensive tackle for Alabama and the Miami Dolphins. Mathis and previous wife, TikTok star Katie Mathis, coparent 3 daughters.

On April 19, 2018, Mathis sold a 1952 Topps Mickey Mantle baseball card via Heritage Auctions for $2.88 million. At the time, it was the second-highest sale price for a trading card ever, behind only the T206 Honus Wagner.

Mathis finished 35th at the 2019 PokerStars Players No Limit Hold’em Championship (PSPC).

Mathis now runs a technology development company called mathisit (pronounced math is it).
