= Royal Swedish Navy Cadet Band =

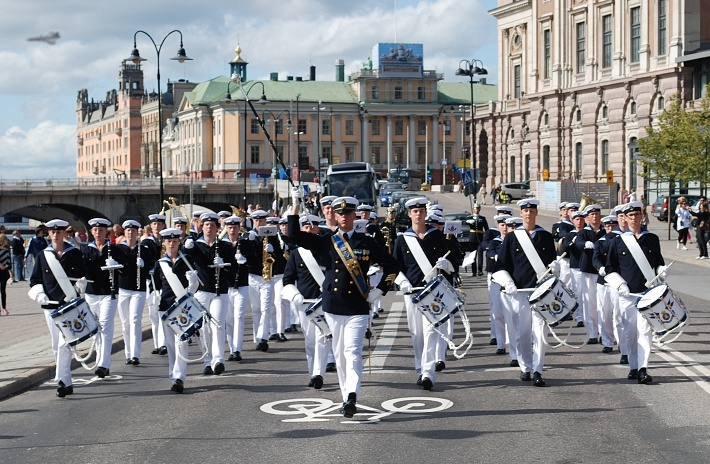
The Royal Swedish Cadet Band at Changing of the Guards parade, Stockholm 2009

The Royal Swedish Navy Cadet Band (RSwNCB) (Swedish: Marinens ungdomsmusikkår, MUK) is a symphonic wind band with military traditions, and was created in 2002 as a non profit organization in cooperation with the Swedish Armed Forces Music Corps and the Royal Swedish Navy Band. The RSwNCB is the only young band in Sweden, alongside the former conscript bands, which has been approved for and performed at the ceremony of the Changing of the Royal Guards at the Stockholm Palace in Stockholm.

The band has a close contact with the Royal Swedish Navy Band/Life Guards.

The RSwNCB consists of about 70 young musicians and has most of its rehearsals in the naval city of Karlskrona in the south-east of Sweden. The musicians come from all of Sweden, but the south is especially well represented. The band works in project form and rehearses one weekend per month which results in one or several performances.

The primary goal for the RSwNCB is to safeguard and develop the Swedish military music in general and the Swedish naval music in particular. This is achieved by using the Ship-cadet corps uniforms and hence keeping their traditions since 1685. Another goal is to be a solid platform for further musical development and education.

== Major performances ==
The Royal Swedish Navy Cadet Band at the changing of the guard at Stockholm Palace, Sweden, in July 2011.

The RSwNCB has participated in the following military tattoos and music festivals:

- 2004: Swedish Military Tattoo
- 2005: Ystad International Military Tattoo
- 2006: Swedish Military Tattoo, Eksjö Tattoo
- 2008: Eksjö Tattoo, Musikparade der Nationen in Hannover
- 2009: Musikschau der Nationen in Bremen, Fulda Military Tattoo, Polizeishow Hamburg
- 2010: Musikparade Germany in Frankfurt, Stuttgart, Erfurt and Munich, Birmingham Military Tattoo
- 2011: Musikparade Germany in Rostock, Cottbus and Schwerin, Sweden International Tattoo in Malmö Arena, Malmö
- 2012: New Year's Day Rose Parade in Pasadena, California on January 2
- 2013: Zürich Tattoo in Zürich, Switzerland and a new years concert with Sven-Bertil Taube
- 2014: Det Sønderjyske Tattoo in Aabenraa, Musikparade Germany; Dresden, Berlin, Hannover and a new years concert with Nassim al Fakir
- 2019: Rose Parade in Pasadena, California on New Year's Day
- 2024: Musikparade Germany in Oldenburg, Hamburg and Hannover

The RSwNCB participated in the cortege at the Wedding of Victoria, Crown Princess of Sweden, and Daniel Westling on 19 June 2010.

== The first drummer or drum major ==
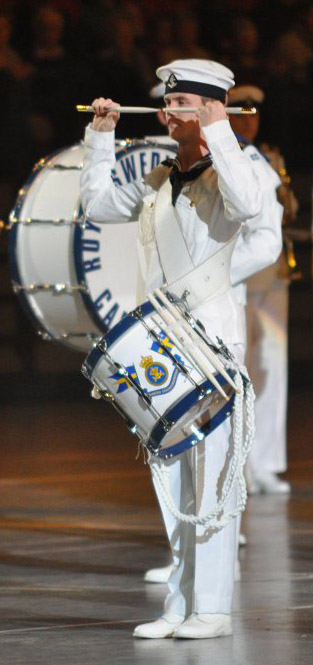
Drummer wearing the Ship-cadet corps emblem on the cap

The first drummer, or drum major (Swedish: flaggtrumslagare) is the leader of the band during parades and figurative shows. The First drummer's tasks include rehearsal of marching exercise and figurative shows, for performances. The first drummer does not carry a drum; the title is better understood as the leader of the drummers (and as such of the band). The sign of command of the first drummer is the ceremonial mace, and by tradition, an ornate drum strap is carried across the shoulder as well.

The sergeant major of the drums, or drum major, is the leader of a marching band, drum or bugle corps, or pipe band. The drum major is usually positioned at the head of the band or corps and is the figure who stands out in the public eye. The drum major provides commands either verbally, through hand gestures, or with a mace in the military or with whistle commands or a baton in the US civilian bands, to the ensemble regarding where to march, what to play, and what time to keep. They are often dressed in more ornate clothing than the rest of the band or corps.

A group of band members alternate on the task to lead the band in parade and marching exercise. Theodor Hjortenhammar, Tomas Ohlsson and Anthon Haväng are the current members of the first drummer group. All members play in the band when they do not have to perform as the first drummer. Since 2010 Theodor Hjortenhammar has been responsible for composing the figurative shows.

== Uniform ==
The uniform of the Royal Swedish Navy Cadet Band has its own unique story which begins in the early days of the naval city Karlskrona and the Ship-cadet corps.

The ship-cadet corps was a group of youth who were taught sailing and other maritime skills aboard the large sailing ships in Sweden. The history of the ship-cadet corps began in 1685 and the corps with its musical performances was decommissioned in 1939. The corps had companies in Karlskrona, Stockholm and Marstrand.

The uniform was often quite simple. The trousers were sometimes sewn from sail cloth and could therefore be quite roomy. Under the collar, a scarf or råbandshalsduk was worn. Two of the things which have been kept through history are the emblem on the cap and the ribbon for the cap (topplänta). The emblem is an anchor, mirrored with respect to the one in use by other maritime bodies. The ribbon was used during climbs in the masts, fastened under the chin. It became tradition that the ribbon be fastened during parades ashore as well, a tradition that the Royal Swedish Navy Cadet Band keeps alive to this day.

== Records ==
- "Avanti per Patria!" was released in 2010. It features many famous marches from Sweden as well as several international greats, conducted by Musical Director Jörgen Flink. The record was produced by the Blekinge Institute of Technology, BTH. It was recorded in Sparresalen in Karlskrona and in a studio on the BTH campus in Karlshamn.
- "We <3 Marches" was released just before the end of 2013. It was recorded in the Assembly Hall at Heleneholmsskolan in Malmö. The record was conducted by Musical Director LiseLotte Hjortenhammar. Recording and mastering was done by Mille Sjöberg.

== Gallery ==
Musikparade der Nationen Hannover

Musikparade der Nationen Hannover

Performing at Eksjö Tattoo Parade in 2008
