= Pawa =

Pawa or pawva may refer to:

- PAWA Dominicana, Caribbean Airline
- Pawa, Pakistan, one of the 51 Union Councils of Abbottabad District in the Khyber Pakhtunkhwa province of Pakistan
- Pāua, Māori word for the abalone
- "Pawa!", a collaborative single by Asha Puthli and Say She She

== See also ==
- Pava (disambiguation)
