= Pava, Iran =

Pava پاوا
- Village
- Location within Iran
- Coordinates: 36°18′02″N 59°42′02″E
- Country: Iran
- Province: Razavi Khorasan
- County: Mashhad
- Bakhsh: Central
- Rural District: Kenevist

Population (2006)
  - Total: 230
- Time zone: UTC+3:30 (IRST)
  - Summer (DST): UTC+4:30 (IRDT)

Pava (Persian: پاوا, also Romanized as Pāvā) is a village in Kenevist Rural District, in the Central District of Mashhad County, Razavi Khorasan Province, Iran. At the 2006 census, its population was 230, in 46 families.
