= University of Utah Marching Band =

College marching band in Salt Lake City, Utah

- Nickname: Marching Utes
- School: University of Utah
- Location: Salt Lake City, UT
- Conference: Big 12
- Director: Brian Sproul
- Members: 220
- Website: uofubands.org

The University of Utah Marching Band (also known as The Pride of Utah Marching Band or simply The Pride of Utah) is the premier marching ensemble of the University of Utah. It has been a staple of Utah's marching music history since its earliest days. The band performs at all University of Utah home football games, as well as some away games and bowl games. As of 2026, its director is Brian Sproul.

== History ==
The University of Utah Athletics Department has stated that the University of Utah's band was started in the 1940s as a military ensemble performing at various ceremonies and events around the university campus. Taking a cue from college bands in the Midwest, A. Ray Olpin, President of the university, recruited Ron Gregory from Ohio State University in 1948 to establish a similar marching band for Utah. Despite early success, support for the band gradually faded during the 1960s which culminated in the termination of funding for the band by the Associated Students for the University of Utah (ASUU) in 1969. A 1976 fund-raising campaign led by Gregg I. Hanson successfully re-established the band.

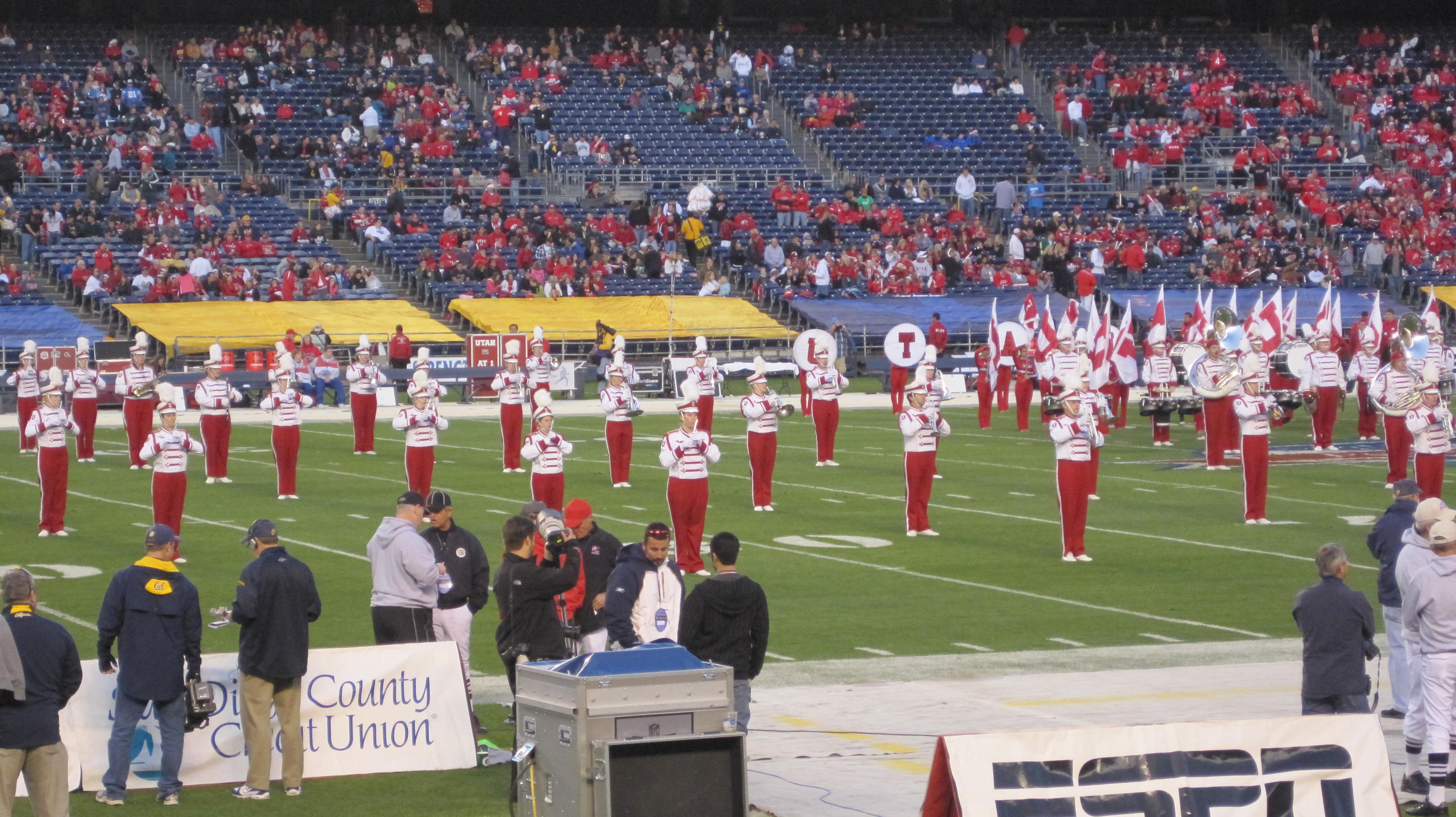
The Pride of Utah executes its pregame performance at the 2009 Poinsettia Bowl.

The Pride of Utah has performed at the following notable events:

- The 2003 Liberty Bowl
- The 2005 BCS Tostitos Fiesta Bowl
- The 2005 Emerald Bowl
- The 2006 Armed Forces Bowl
- The 2007 Poinsettia Bowl
- The 2009 BCS Allstate Sugar Bowl
- The 2009 Inaugural Parade of President Barack Obama
- The 2009 Poinsettia Bowl
- The 2010 Maaco Bowl Las Vegas
- The 2011 Sun Bowl
- The 2014 Las Vegas Bowl
- The 2015 Las Vegas Bowl
- The 2016 Foster Farms Bowl
- The 2017 Heart of Dallas Bowl
- The 2018 Holiday Bowl
- The 2019 Alamo Bowl
- The 2022 Rose Bowl
- The 2023 Rose Bowl
- The 2023 Las Vegas Bowl
- The 2025 Las Vegas Bowl
