= Pacific American Volunteer Association =

Pacific American Volunteer Association World Environmental Foundation
- Abbreviation: PAVA
- Formation: 2001
- Type: Volunteer Association
- Legal status: Active
- Purpose: PAVA's goals are to preserve the environment and encourage positive relationships with local communities, expand volunteerism, cultivate the youth to be the next generation of leaders that are committed to make positive improvements in society.
- Headquarters: Los Angeles
- Region served: Everywhere
- Website: pavaworld.org

The Pacific American Volunteer Association World Environmental Foundation, or PAVA World, is a non-profit volunteer organization dedicated to preserving the environment and promoting relationships within communities. PAVA World specializes in two areas of volunteer work— environmental education, cleanup and restoration work, and multicultural performance featuring Korean and African drumming and dance. PAVA World is also involved in assisting the elderly and community service. PAVA World is in charge of park restoration and conservation in Griffith Park's Bird Sanctuary. PAVA typically turns out 5,000 volunteers at its Los Angeles River Clean Up and Restoration volunteer events. PAVA has produced Du Doong, a Korean, African, and multicultural drum and dance festival, at the Dolby Theatre in Hollywood, twice. Furthermore, the PAVA Samul nori team, which includes 7 ethnic instruments, traditional dancers, and traditional flag bearers, has participated in the Hollywood Christmas Parade since 2011. The organization is hoping to perform at the Kodak Theatre, again, in the near future. PAVA works with Heal the Bay on environmental projects. PAVA World works with the NAACP on multicultural shows.
