= Excelsior High School (Norwalk, California) =

High school in California, United States

Coordinates: 33.888693°N 118.082514°W

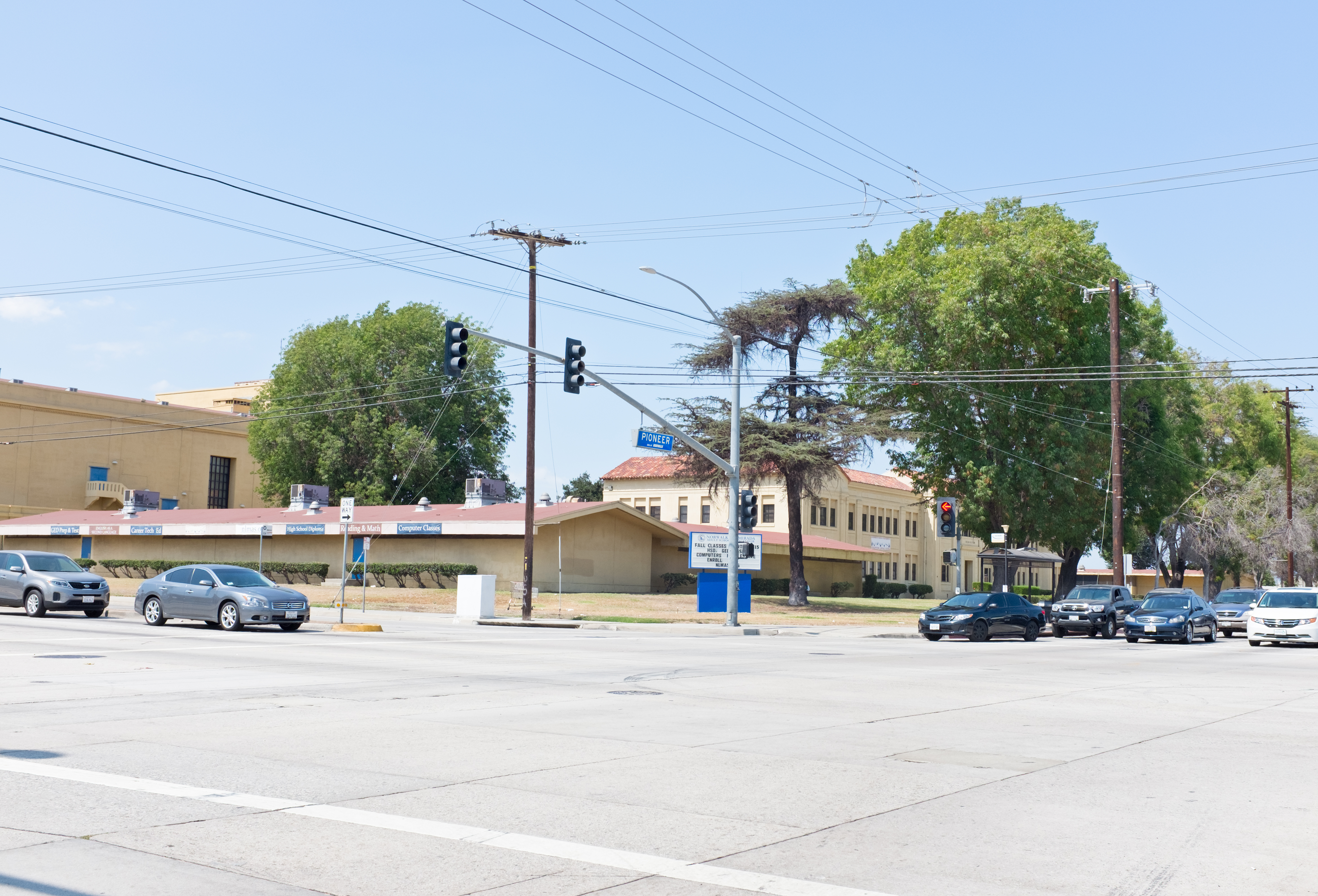
- Excelsior High School in Norwalk, California

Location
- 15711 Pioneer Blvd; Norwalk, California 90650; United States

Information
- Type: public high school
- Opened: 1924
- Closed: 1981
- Colors: green and white
- Mascot: Peter Pilot, replaced with Snoopy, late 1960s
- Team name: Pilots
- Website: excelsiorpilots.com

Norwalk–La Mirada Adult School

Information
- Type: GED, community education
- Opened: 1979
- School district: Norwalk–La Mirada Unified School District

Excelsior High School, originally named Excelsior Union High School, was founded in 1903 and located on Walnut Street in Norwalk, California. The current campus was built in 1924. The campus sustained substantial damage to the administration building, auditorium, and other buildings in the 1933 Long Beach earthquake (as did the Norwalk Grammar School which occupied the former Excelsior Union High school building). Although the earthquake occurred after school hours, one student died when an internal wall in a portion of the boy's gym failed. Its last graduating class was 1981.

The Excelsior Union High School District was composed of a single school which supported a district including present day Norwalk, Cerritos, Artesia, and Bellflower. In 1919, Excelsior Union High School had seven teachers, and an enrollment of ninety-eight. After World War II, the area rapidly changed from agricultural to residential and several new high schools were added to the district to absorb the large increase in population, including Bellflower, Artesia, Norwalk, La Mirada, and Gahr High Schools. In the 1950s, Bellflower High School was realigned under the Bellflower Unified School District. In the mid-1960s the changing needs of the area were the subject of a referendum to restructure the governance of area schools and realign the high schools under three school districts. The referendum passed and with the revised district boundaries, Excelsior Union High School's name was changed to Excelsior High School and it was made part of the Norwalk–La Mirada Unified School District.

For much of its history, the student body was known as "The Pilots" and the school mascot was Peter Pilot. In the late 1960s the cartoon character Snoopy was adopted as the mascot. The school colors were green and white.

The school and campus still exist at the corner of Alondra and Pioneer Boulevards in Norwalk. It is now the home to the Norwalk–La Mirada Adult School. Since its closure, the campus has been the location for the filming of Grease 2 and High School U.S.A. and the 1982 TV series Square Pegs.

Excelsior Adult School was also the home field for Excelsior's former archrival, the Norwalk Lancers Football team. Norwalk High has since built their own home field for the first time in 2021. During the late 80s till 1992, the football field and baseball facilities were also home of the Leffingwell Christian High School Lions and the Pioneer Baptist High School Patriots.

== Notable alumni ==
- Pat Nixon (class of 1929) – First Lady of the United States
- William Conrad (class of 1937) – actor, producer, and director for radio, film and television
- James Gattuso (class of 1975) – political pundit and senior research fellow for the Roe Institute for Economic Policy Studies at The Heritage Foundation

== See also ==
- List of closed secondary schools in California
