= 605 League =

High school athletic conference in southeastern Los Angeles

The 605 League is a high school athletic conference in southeastern Los Angeles County, California affiliated with the CIF Southern Section. It was created in 2019, with 3 members of from the Suburban League; Artesia, Cerritos and Glenn, two from the Academy League; Oxford and Whitney and Pioneer from the Del Rio League All of the schools are located less than 3 miles (4.8 km) east of the 605 Freeway.

== Schools ==
As of the 2019–20 school year, the members in the league are:

- Artesia High School
- Cerritos High School
- Glenn High School
- Oxford Academy
- Pioneer High School
- Whitney High School
