= Fonoti =

Fonoti may refer to:

- Fonoti of Aunuu, Fa'amatai title
- Fonoti (surname)
- Va'a-o-Fonoti, district in Samoa
