= Mamadou N'Diaye (basketball, born 1993) =

Senegalese basketball player (born 1993)

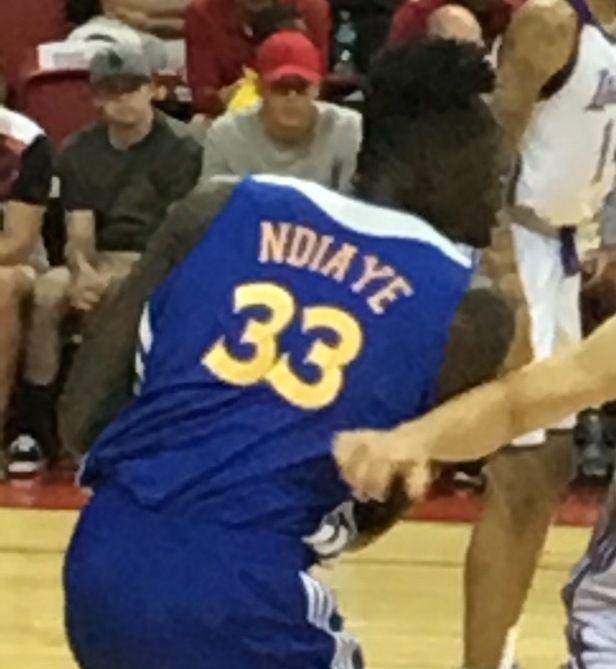
- N'Diaye with the Golden State Warriors during the 2016 NBA Summer League

Personal information
- Born: 14 September 1993 (age 33) Dakar, Senegal
- Listed height: 7 ft 6 in (2.29 m)
- Listed weight: 300 lb (136 kg)

Career information
- High school: Stoneridge Prep (Simi Valley, California); Brethren Christian (Huntington Beach, California)
- College: UC Irvine (2013–2016)
- NBA draft: 2016: undrafted
- Playing career: 2018–2020
- Position: Center

Career history
- 2018: Fuerza Regia de Monterrey
- 2019–2020: Correcaminos UAT Victoria

Career highlights
- First-team All-Big West (2016); 2× Big West Defensive Player of the Year (2014, 2016); First-team Parade All-American (2013)
- Stats at Basketball Reference

Mamadou N'Diaye (/ˈmɑːməduː ˈɛndʒaɪ/ MAH-mə-doo EN-jy; born 14 September 1993) is a Senegalese former professional basketball player. He played college basketball for UC Irvine, where he was the tallest basketball player at the NCAA Division I level, standing at 7 ft 6 in (2.29 m).

N'Diaye, a center, was named Big West Conference Defensive Player of the Year after the 2013–14 NCAA Division I men's basketball season and earned all-conference honorable mention accolades as well. He was considered a talented shot-blocker. N'Diaye played professionally for Fuerza Regia de Monterrey and Correcaminos UAT Victoria of the Liga Nacional de Baloncesto Profesional (LNBP). He is also one of the tallest living humans.

== Early life ==
N'Diaye was born in Dakar, Senegal. He had an older brother. He grew up playing soccer and did not seriously begin playing basketball at a young age. In 2010, Amadou Koundoul, who was the assistant coach for the UC Irvine Anteaters men's basketball team at the time, saw N'Diaye participate in a pick-up game in a gymnasium at Dakar. He asked him to travel to the United States, and N'Diaye accepted the offer. He arrived in the US without knowing how to speak English. In the new country, he initially had trouble with speaking English and often needed things to be translated to French.

After experiencing headaches upon his arrival to the U.S., N'Diaye saw a doctor and it was discovered that he was suffering from a golf ball-sized tumor in his pituitary gland, which had caused gigantism and was threatening his vision. Afterwards, he recalled the moment, "For me, it wasn’t a big deal because I didn’t know what a tumor was. Once I found out, it was tough to hear I had one." The condition was treated in the Hoag Memorial Hospital following several charitable donations from around the area. A married couple who lived in Huntington Beach, California, a city close to N'Diaye's future school, offered to become his guardians to ease his commute for medical treatments.

== High school career ==
Prior to participating in sports, N'Diaye attended Stoneridge Prep in Simi Valley, California, who steered him through his early years in the United States. The school had a history of producing high-caliber international basketball players, including Enes Kanter and Nikola Vučević. However, N'Diaye was not allowed to play the sport during his first year in the high school because of California Interscholastic Federation rules. (Note: The California Interscholastic Federation (CIF) requires foreign students to sit out one year before taking part in athletics.) As a sophomore, he was officially granted the permission to transfer to another high school.

"It was all I knew– California and UC Irvine. And the beach reminds me of Senegal."

— N'Diaye after traveling to the US

N'Diaye attended Brethren Christian School in Huntington Beach, California. He played under head coach Jon Bahnsen. According to Bahnsen upon arriving at the school, N'Diaye "could barely get up and down the court more than a few times" due to his poor fitness after rehabilitation. In his high school years, N'Diaye, who stood 7 ft 5 in (2.26 m) at the time, was considered one of the tallest to play at that level. He was also approached by the Guinness World Records to determine the authenticity of the claims. Bahnsen said, "Our school wouldn't cooperate with them, but Guinness probably wanted to see if he was the world's tallest high school basketball player."

As a junior at Brethren Christian, N'Diaye finished the season averaging 24 points and 14 rebounds. CBS News wrote that he was "impossible to defend" because of his height. At the conclusion of his final, senior season with Brethren Christian, N'Diaye averaged about 27 points, 14 rebounds, and 4.5 blocks. He partook his highest-scoring game in January 2013 against Oxford Academy, with 45 points and 15 rebounds coming off an illness that kept him out of the initial games. After the year, N'Diaye earned All-State honors and was named CIF-5AA Player of the Year. He also earned the 2013 John R. Wooden High School Player of the Year award for CIF Division V. In the same season, N'Diaye garnered National Christian Schools Athletic Association Player of the Year and Far West Super-Region team accolades. Also, he was named Academy League Most Valuable Player.

According to the ESPN Recruiting Nation, N'Diaye was the 6th most promising high school player in his state. ESPN analysts commented on N'Diaye's basketball talent by saying, "Ndiaye is a legit 7-foot-5 prospect with extraordinary length and huge hands." He officially committed to play with the UC Irvine Anteaters men's basketball team, following matriculation at the University of California, Irvine, on 14 November 2012. He also considered Oregon, Georgetown, and Pepperdine. N'Diaye said that he selected UC Irvine because he "felt very comfortable at the university and with the coaching staff."

College recruiting
| Name | Hometown | School | Height | Weight | Commit date |
|---|---|---|---|---|---|
| Mamadou N'Diaye; C | Huntington Beach | Brethren Christian | 7 ft 5 in (2.26 m) | 260 lb (120 kg) | Nov 14, 2012 |
| Mamadou N'Diaye; C | Recruit ratings: Scout: Rivals: (85) | | | | |

== College career ==
=== Freshman year ===
Upon joining the UC Irvine basketball program, N'Diaye was instantly recognized as the tallest player in the NCAA Division I. Russell Turner, the head basketball coach, said, "I'm excited to add a player of Mamadou's quality and character to our program."

On 2 November 2013, N'Diaye represented UC Irvine for the first time in an exhibition game vs. Chapman. He finished with 9 points, a team-high 7 rebounds and 5 blocks. Turner said after the game, "I was pleased with Mamadou's play. He is a dominating factor at times and he will be a factor that other teams will have to deal with." N'Diaye made his collegiate debut on 8 November 2013 against Fresno State with 5 points, 4 rebounds, and 1 block as the starting center. He also shot 1-of-1 from the field and 3-of-10 from the free throw line. However, the team lost the game at the buzzer.

When the Anteaters defeated the Washington Huskies men's basketball team on 14 November 2013, N'Diaye recorded a season-high 18 points. He also added 8 rebounds and 9 blocks. The game was also his first experience in the 2K Sports Classic. His blocked shots total broke the school's single-game record under the category. He recorded his first career double-double with Irvine on 28 December 2013 against Arizona State, with 12 points, 4 blocks, and a career-high 12 rebounds. In January, in a game at rival Long Beach State, coach Dan Monson told reporters that he believed his team was still afraid to attack the paint even when N'Diaye was sitting on the bench. In early February, N'Diaye broke the school's single-game block record for the second time in the season, totaling with 11 blocked shots and 10 rebounds against Long Beach State. N'Diaye also broke the conference's all-time record. It was his first career game in which he recorded a double-double without scoring over ten points.

N'Diaye finished the 2013–14 season with averages of 7.8 points, 6.2 rebounds, 0.2 assists, 3.1 blocks, and 1.7 turnovers per game. Following the year, he was labeled a future top prospect by Kevin Pelton of ESPN.com, strongly due to his performance against Washington, in which he broke the school record for blocks for a single game. UC Irvine lost 58–64 in the first round of the 2014 National Invitation Tournament against SMU. They fell to Cal Poly in the 2014 Big West Conference men's basketball tournament shortly before.

=== Sophomore year ===
N'Diaye debuted as a sophomore on 14 November 2014, recording 9 points, 2 rebounds, and 1 block against Chapman University. He scored a career-high 21 points on 29 November, vs Loyola Marymount. This was the first time he notched over 20 points in his college career as well. This would be his season-high scoring total. N'Diaye was sidelined for two months in his second year due to a foot injury. After his team qualified for the 2015 NCAA Men's Division I Basketball Tournament, he drew attention on Twitter. Louisville Cardinals men's basketball head coach Rick Pitino, who coached against UC Irvine's Russell Turner in the first round, said, "I thought he was eight feet tall." The Anteaters' season ended when they lost 55–57 to Louisville, in spite of the 12 points, 5 rebounds, and 1 block N'Diaye recorded. He finished the season averaging 10.5 points, 5.1 rebounds, and 1.7 blocks.

=== Junior year ===
In mid-April 2015, N'Diaye made it official that he would forgo the 2015 NBA draft and return to UC Irvine for his junior year. The school later released a statement, in which his coach said, "This is great news for Mamadou and for our program. He is staying here because he is happy, he's committed to his education and he is thriving. I feel really good about those things." Following his second season with the Anteaters, websites such as CBSSports.com considered him a player that would need to play in the NBA Development League before joining a National Basketball Association roster.

By his junior year, N'Diaye was no longer the tallest NCAA player. He faced fellow Senegalese 7 ft 6 in (2.29 m) player Tacko Fall in the tallest tip-off and match-up in US college basketball history in a game against the UCF Knights.

During his junior season, N'Diaye led the Anteaters to a program-best 28 wins. He played in 37 of 38 games on the season, starting 36, and averaged 12.1 points, 7.2 rebounds and 2.4 blocks per game. He broke the UCI school record for blocks with 218 which was previously broken by former teammate Will Davis II the previous season with 208.

On 7 April 2016, N'Diaye declared for the 2016 NBA draft, but did not hire an agent. While he departed UC Irvine, he vowed to continue his studies in order to achieve his dream of getting a college degree. He was later named to the Senegal national basketball team's preliminary squad for the FIBA Olympic Qualifying Tournament in Manila.

== Professional career ==
After going undrafted in the 2016 NBA draft, N'Diaye joined the Golden State Warriors for the 2016 NBA Summer League. On 22 October 2016, he signed with the Detroit Pistons, but was waived later that afternoon. On 30 October, he was acquired by the Grand Rapids Drive of the NBA Development League as an affiliate player of the Pistons. He was later waived by Grand Rapids on 10 November, prior to the start of the regular season.

On 19 September 2018 Ndiaye signed with Fuerza Regia de Monterrey in Mexico's LNBP where he had 2 appearances before being cut. Afterwards, he joined Correcaminos UAT Victoria. He averaged 15.2 points, 11 rebounds, 1.1 assists, and 1.8 blocks per game in the 2019-20 season. On 26 August 2020, N'Diaye re-signed with Correcaminos.

== Player profile ==
Standing seven feet, six inches tall and weighing 300 pounds, N'Diaye's wingspan (fingertip-to-fingertip reach) was measured as 8 ft 1 in (2.46 m) at the 2012 edition of the Amar'e Stoudemire Skills Academy. When he entered college, his wingspan had increased to over 8 ft 3 in (2.51 m). He is solely used as a center due to his height, length, and size. N'Diaye's skill set was often considered "raw" in high school, and received comments from Brethren Christian head coach, Jon Bahnsen, who said, "Right now his game is basically catch, turn, drop-step, dunk." He is also capable of touching the standard basketball rim without jumping.

During the 2016 tournament season, a writer for SB Nation wrote that "When Columbia guards find themselves one-on-one with just his frame between them and the rim, they reverse direction and scurry away, like terrified Tokyoites who just heard Godzilla stomping around. One fan screams 'You're not that tall!' at him, which is a lie. Another yells 'You're only the 36th-tallest in the world!,' which upon further research, turns out to be true."

In the past, N'Diaye has been compared with players such as Yao Ming and Rudy Gobert, who respectively stand 7'6" and 7'1" (2.29 m and 2.16 m) and feature a similar wingspan.

== The Basketball Tournament (TBT) ==
In the summer of 2017, N'Diaye competed in The Basketball Tournament on ESPN for Paul Champions. Competing for the $2 million grand prize, N'Diaye helped lead his team to two victories in the TBT Jamboree which secured Paul Champions' spot as one of the 64 teams in the tournament. During the Jamboree, N'Diaye averaged 8.0 points, 7.0 rebounds and 2.0 blocks per game. In their first-round match up, he helped the Champions to a 78–74 victory over the Talladega Knights; a team led by former NBA players Josh Boone and Gary Forbes. N'Diaye and the Champions would eventually fall in the second-round to the number one seeded Untouchables.

== Career statistics ==
Legend
| GP | Games played | GS | Games started | MPG | Minutes per game |
| FG% | Field goal percentage | 3P% | 3-point field goal percentage | FT% | Free throw percentage |
| RPG | Rebounds per game | APG | Assists per game | SPG | Steals per game |
| BPG | Blocks per game | PPG | Points per game | **Bold** | Career high |

=== College ===
| Year | Team | GP | GS | MPG | FG% | 3P% | FT% | RPG | APG | SPG | BPG | PPG |
|---|---|---|---|---|---|---|---|---|---|---|---|---|
| 2013–14 | UC Irvine | 34 | 34 | 21.0 | **.707** | .000 | .426 | 6.2 | .2 | **.2** | **3.1** | 8.0 |
| 2014–15 | UC Irvine | 15 | 11 | 19.9 | .634 | .000 | .526 | 5.1 | .1 | **.2** | 1.7 | 10.5 |
| 2015–16 | UC Irvine | **37** | **36** | **23.2** | .632 | .000 | **.673** | **7.2** | **.7** | **.2** | 2.4 | **12.1** |
