= Jim Hough =

American football player (born 1956)

No. 51
- Positions: Guard, center

Personal information
- Born: August 4, 1956 (age 70); Lynwood, California, U.S.
- Listed height: 6 ft 2 in (1.88 m)
- Listed weight: 267 lb (121 kg)

Career information
- High school: La Mirada (CA)
- College: Utah State
- NFL draft: 1978: 4th round, 100th overall pick

Career history
- Minnesota Vikings (1978–1986)

Awards and highlights
- Second-team All-American (1977)

Career NFL statistics
- Games played: 111
- Games started: 75
- Fumble recoveries: 2
- Stats at Pro Football Reference

James Hough (born August 4, 1956) is an American former professional football player who was an offensive lineman and long snapper for nine seasons with the Minnesota Vikings of the National Football League (NFL). He played in 111 games, starting 78. He played college football for the Utah State Aggies, earning second-team All-American honors and playing in the college all star East-West Shrine Game in 1977.

In 2016, Hough was inducted into the Utah State University Hall of Fame

Hough is also known for his participation in the 1982 World's Strongest Man

He attended La Mirada High School, where he played football and was on the first team to inaugurate the stadium in 1973.

He now coaches football for the Chaska Hawks in Chaska, Minnesota.

Hough has recently been inducted into both the La Mirada High School and Utah State University Hall of Fame

https://utahstateaggies.com/honors/hall-of-fame/jim-hough/27
