= Norwalk, California =

City in California, United States

- City
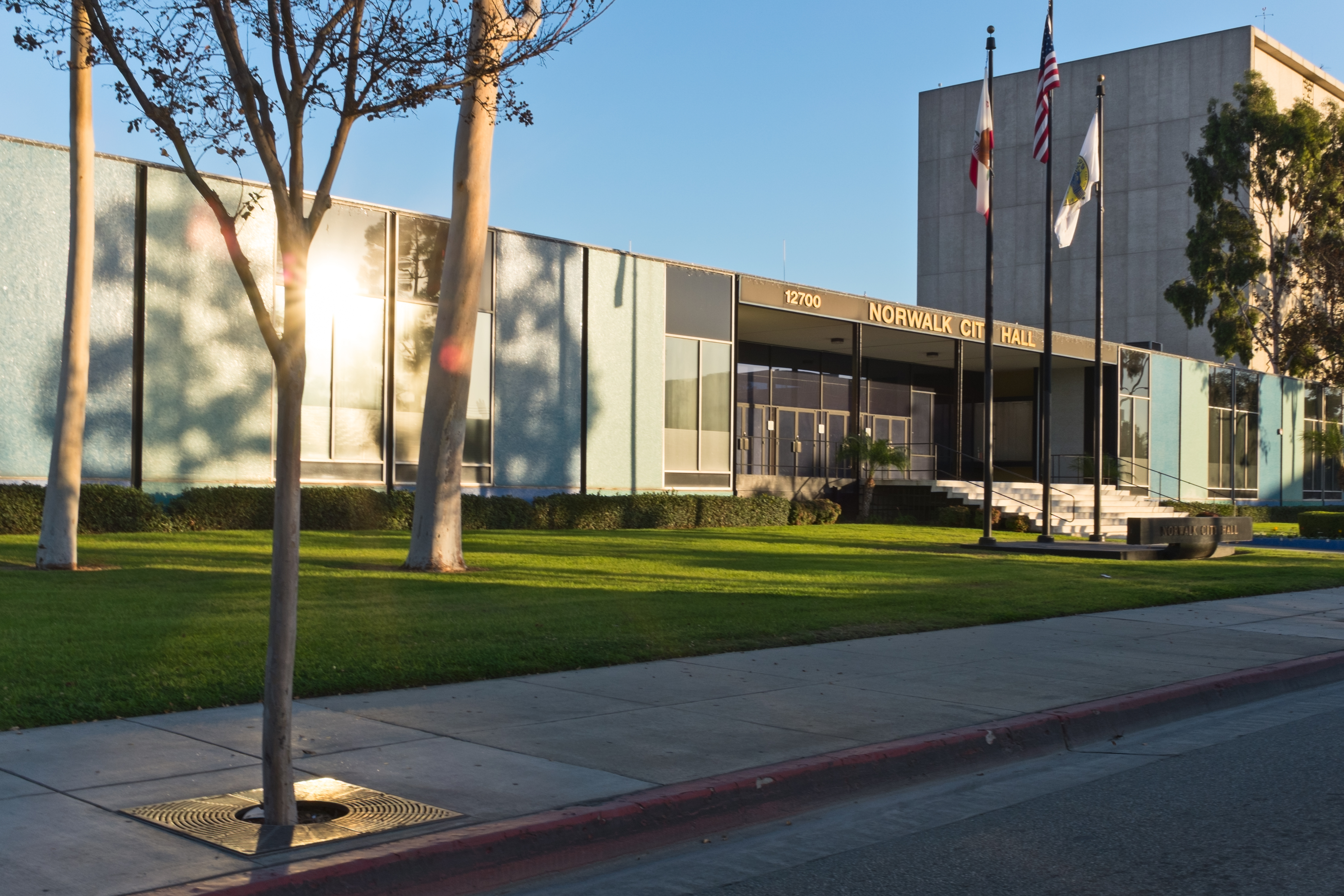
- Norwalk City Hall

- Flag Seal Logo
- Motto: "A Connected Community"
- Interactive map of Norwalk, California
- Location in California Location in the United States
- Coordinates: 33°54′25″N 118°05′00″W
- Country: United States
- State: California
- County: Los Angeles
- Incorporated: August 26, 1957

Government
  - Type: Council/Manager
  - Mayor: Tony Ayala
  - Vice Mayor: Jennifer Perez
  - City council: Rick Ramirez; Margarita L. Rios; Ana Valencia
  - City manager: Jesus Gomez
  - Finance Director/ Treasurer: Jana Stuard
  - City Clerk: Theresa Devoy

Area
  - Total: 9.75 sq mi (25.24 km^{2})
  - Land: 9.71 sq mi (25.14 km^{2})
  - Water: 0.039 sq mi (0.10 km^{2}) 0.40%
- Elevation: 92 ft (28 m)

Population (2020)
  - Total: 102,773
  - Rank: 14th in Los Angeles County; 78th in California; 335th in the United States
  - Density: 10,590/sq mi (4,088/km^{2})
- Time zone: UTC−08:00 (PST)
  - Summer (DST): UTC−07:00 (PDT)
- ZIP codes: 90650–90652, 90659
- Area code: 562
- FIPS code: 06-52526
- GNIS feature IDs: 1661123, 2411281
- Website: www.norwalk.org

Norwalk is a city in Los Angeles County, California, United States. The population was 102,773 at the 2020 census.

Founded in the late 19th century, Norwalk was incorporated as a city in 1957. It is located 17 miles (27 km) southeast of downtown Los Angeles and is part of the Greater Los Angeles area.

Norwalk is a member of the Gateway Cities Council of Governments. Norwalk's sister cities are Morelia in the Mexican state of Michoacán, and Hermosillo, in the Mexican state of Sonora.

== History ==
The area known as "Norwalk" was first home to the Shoshonean Native American tribe. They survived primarily on honey, an array of berries, acorns, sage, squirrels, rabbits and birds. Their huts were part of the Sejat Indian village.

In the late 1760s, settlers and missions flourished under Spanish rule with the famous El Camino Real trail traversing the area. Manuel Nieto, a Spanish soldier, received a Spanish land grant (Rancho Los Nietos) in 1784 that included Norwalk.

After the Mexican–American War in 1848, the Rancho and mining days ended. Portions of the land were subdivided and made available for sale when California was admitted into the union of the United States. Word of this land development reached the Sproul Brothers in Oregon. They recalled the fertile land and huge sycamore trees they saw during an earlier visit to the Southern California area. In 1869, Atwood Sproul, on behalf of his brother, Gilbert, purchased 463 acres (1.87 km^{2}) of land at $11 an acre ($2,700/km^{2}) in an area known as Corazón de los Valles, or "Heart of the Valleys".

By 1873, railroads were being built in the area and the Sprouls deeded 23 acres (93,000 m^{2}), stipulating a "passenger stop" clause in the deed. Three days after the Anaheim Branch Railroad crossed the "North-walk" for the first time, Gilbert Sproul surveyed a town site. In 1874, the name was recorded officially as Norwalk. While a majority of the Norwalk countryside remained undeveloped during the 1880s, the Norwalk Station allowed potential residents the opportunity to visit the "country" from across the nation.

The families referred to as the "first families" of Norwalk (including the Sprouls, the Dewitts, the Settles, and the Orrs) settled in the area in the years before 1900. D.D. Johnston pioneered the first school system in Norwalk in 1880. Johnston was also responsible for the first real industry in town, a cheese factory, by furnishing Tom Lumbard with the money in 1882. Norwalk's prosperity was evident in the 1890s with the construction of a number of fine homes that were located in the middle of orchards, farms and dairies. Headstones for these families can be found at Little Lake Cemetery, which was founded in 1843 on the border between Norwalk and Santa Fe Springs at Lakeland Road.

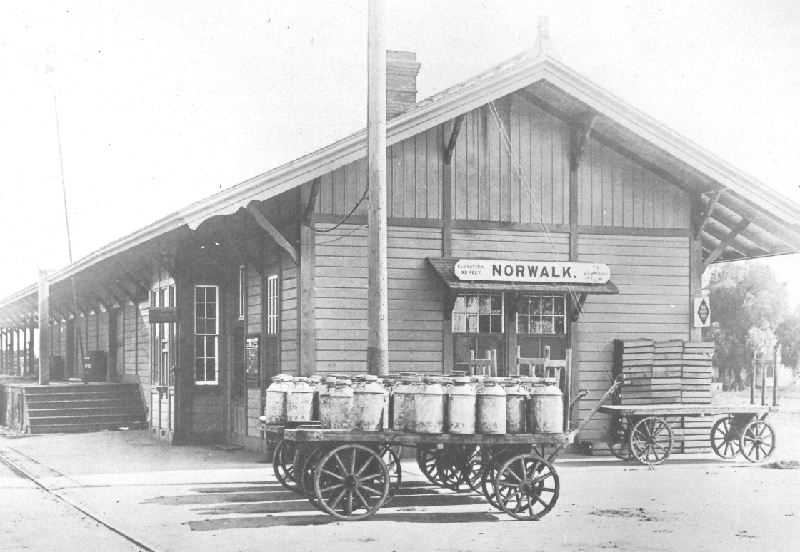
Norwalk depot and a wagon loaded with milk cans, 1910

At the turn of the 19th century, Norwalk had become established as a dairy center. Of the 50 local families reported in the 1900 census, most were associated with farming or with the dairy industry. Norwalk was also the home of some of the largest sugar beet farms in all of Southern California during this era. Many of the dairy farmers who settled in Norwalk during the early part of the 20th century were Dutch.

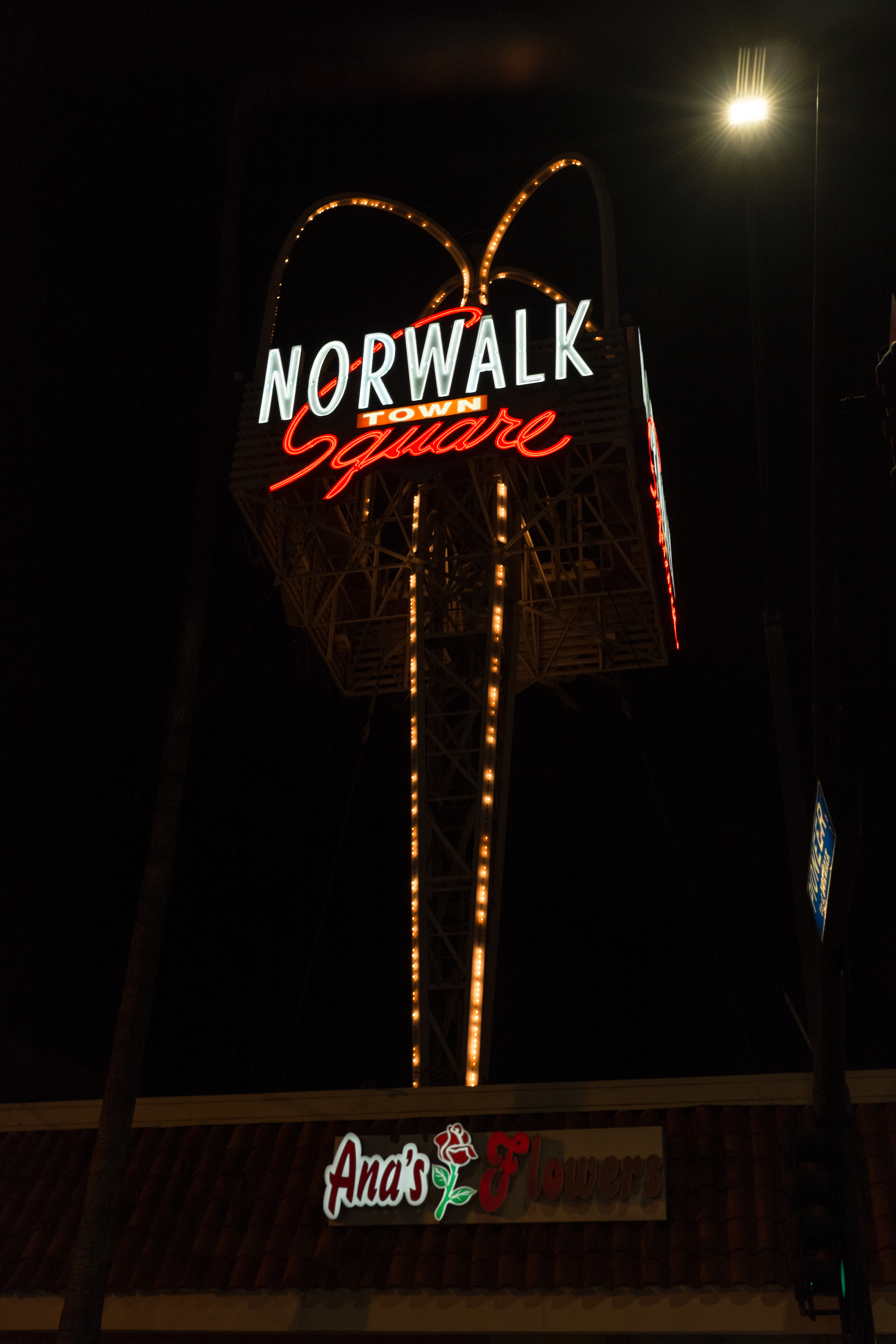
Norwalk Town Square sign at night; the sign was completed in 1954 by the Pacific Life Insurance Company

After the 1950s, the Hispanic population in Norwalk grew significantly as the area became increasingly residential.

In February 1958, two military aircraft, a Douglas C-118A military transport and a U.S. Navy P2V-5F Neptune patrol bomber, collided over Norwalk at night. Forty-seven servicemen were killed, as was a civilian 23-year-old woman on the ground who was hit by falling debris. A plaque commemorating the disaster and erected by the American Legion in 1961 marks the spot of the accident, today a mini-mall at the corner of Firestone Boulevard and Pioneer Boulevard.

== Geography ==
According to the United States Census Bureau, the city has a total area of 25.243 km^{2} (10 sq mi), of which 9.707 square miles (25.14 km^{2}) is land and 0.039 square miles (0.10 km^{2}) (0.40%) is water.

=== Neighborhoods ===
- Carmenita (South Norwalk)
- Civic Center (Central Norwalk)
- Norwalk Hills (North Norwalk)
- South Norwalk
- Studebaker (North Norwalk)
- Norwalk Manor (South East Norwalk) (not to be confused with Norwalk Manor, a major subdivision built in 1947 to 1949)

== Demographics ==
Historical population
Census	Pop.	Note	%±
1960	88,739		—
1970	90,164		1.6%
1980	84,901		−5.8%
1990	94,279		11.0%
2000	103,298		9.6%
2010	105,549		2.2%
2020	102,773		−2.6%
2025 (est.)	97,104		−5.5%
U.S. Decennial Census; 1860–1870 1880–1890; 1900 1910 1920; 1930 1940 1950; 1960 1970 1980; 1990 2000 2010; 2020

Norwalk first appeared as a city in the 1960 U.S. census as part of the Downey-Norwalk census county division (pop. 272,729 in 1960).

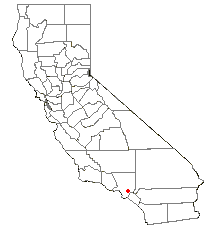

Norwalk city, California – Racial and ethnic composition Note: the US Census treats Hispanic/Latino as an ethnic category. This table excludes Latinos from the racial categories and assigns them to a separate category. Hispanics/Latinos may be of any race.
Race / Ethnicity (NH = Non-Hispanic)	Pop 1980	Pop 1990	Pop 2000	Pop 2010	Pop 2020	% 1980	% 1990	% 2000	% 2010	% 2020
White alone (NH)	44,964	34,633	19,574	13,007	8,919	52.72%	36.73%	18.95%	12.32%	8.68%
Black or African American alone (NH)	1,372	2,846	4,529	4,135	3,849	1.61%	3.02%	4.38%	3.92%	3.75%
Native American or Alaska Native alone (NH)	771	510	463	281	294	0.90%	0.54%	0.45%	0.27%	0.29%
Asian alone (NH)	3,752	10,931	11,724	12,387	13,680	4.40%	11.59%	11.35%	11.74%	13.31%
Native Hawaiian or Pacific Islander alone (NH)	3,752	10,931	336	366	370	4.40%	11.59%	0.33%	0.35%	0.36%
Other Race alone (NH)	213	241	138	191	486	0.25%	0.26%	0.13%	0.18%	0.47%
Mixed race or Multiracial (NH)	x	x	1,569	1,141	1,627	x	x	1.52%	1.08%	1.58%
Hispanic or Latino (any race)	34,214	45,118	64,965	74,041	73,548	40.12%	47.86%	62.89%	70.15%	71.56%
Total	85,286	94,279	103,298	105,549	102,773	100.00%	100.00%	100.00%	100.00%	100.00%

=== 2020 ===
The 2020 United States census reported that Norwalk had a population of 102,773. The population density was 10,587.5 inhabitants per square mile (4,087.9/km^{2}). The racial makeup of Norwalk was 20.1% White, 4.1% African American, 2.4% Native American, 13.7% Asian, 0.4% Pacific Islander, 38.3% from other races, and 21.1% from two or more races. Hispanic or Latino of any race were 71.6% of the population.

The census reported that 98.8% of the population lived in households, 0.7% lived in non-institutionalized group quarters, and 0.5% were institutionalized.

There were 27,835 households, out of which 42.6% included children under the age of 18, 52.7% were married-couple households, 6.8% were cohabiting couple households, 25.7% had a female householder with no partner present, and 14.8% had a male householder with no partner present. 13.1% of households were one person, and 6.5% were one person aged 65 or older. The average household size was 3.65. There were 22,894 families (82.2% of all households).

The age distribution was 22.0% under the age of 18, 10.4% aged 18 to 24, 28.6% aged 25 to 44, 25.2% aged 45 to 64, and 13.7% who were 65 years of age or older. The median age was 36.6 years. For every 100 females, there were 95.8 males.

There were 28,455 housing units at an average density of 2,931.4 units per square mile (1,131.8 units/km^{2}), of which 27,835 (97.8%) were occupied. Of these, 64.6% were owner-occupied, and 35.4% were occupied by renters.

In 2023, the US Census Bureau estimated that the median household income was $98,709, and the per capita income was $31,989. About 7.3% of families and 9.7% of the population were below the poverty line.

=== 2010 ===
The 2010 United States census reported that Norwalk had a population of 105,549. The population density was 10,829.6 inhabitants per square mile (4,181.3/km^{2}). The racial makeup of Norwalk was 52,089 (49.4%) White (12.3% Non-Hispanic White), 4,593 (4.4%) African American, 1,213 (1.1%) Native American, 12,700 (12.0%) Asian (5.3% Filipino, 2.5% Korean, 0.9% Chinese, 0.8% Indian, 0.8% Vietnamese, 0.6% Cambodian, 0.3% Thai, 0.3% Japanese), 431 (0.4%) Pacific Islander, 29,954 (28.4%) from other races, and 4,569 (4.3%) from two or more races. Hispanic or Latino of any race were 74,041 persons (70.1%)

The Census reported that 103,934 people (98.5% of the population) lived in households, 315 (0.3%) lived in non-institutionalized group quarters, and 1,300 (1.2%) were institutionalized.

There were 27,130 households, out of which 13,678 (50.4%) had children under the age of 18 living in them, 15,190 (56.0%) were opposite-sex married couples living together, 5,045 (18.6%) had a female householder with no husband present, 2,348 (8.7%) had a male householder with no wife present. There were 1,712 (6.3%) unmarried opposite-sex partnerships, and 178 (0.7%) same-sex married couples or partnerships. 3,417 households (12.6%) were made up of individuals, and 1,631 (6.0%) had someone living alone who was 65 years of age or older. The average household size was 3.83. There were 22,583 families (83.2% of all households); the average family size was 4.10.

The population was spread out, with 29,164 people (27.6%) under the age of 18, 12,026 people (11.4%) aged 18 to 24, 30,138 people (28.6%) aged 25 to 44, 23,790 people (22.5%) aged 45 to 64, and 10,431 people (9.9%) who were 65 years of age or older. The median age was 32.5 years. For every 100 females, there were 98.5 males. For every 100 females age 18 and over, there were 95.3 males.

There were 28,083 housing units at an average density of 2,881.4 per square mile (1,112.5/km^{2}), of which 17,671 (65.1%) were owner-occupied, and 9,459 (34.9%) were occupied by renters. The homeowner vacancy rate was 1.4%; the rental vacancy rate was 3.8%. 70,180 people (66.5% of the population) lived in owner-occupied housing units and 33,754 people (32.0%) lived in rental housing units.

During 2009–2013, Norwalk had a median household income of $60,770, with 12.9% of the population living below the federal poverty line.

=== Mapping L.A. ===
Mapping L.A. reported that in 2000, Mexican (50.7%) and Filipino (4.3%) were the most common ancestries. Mexico (58.8%) and the Philippines (9.2%) were the most common foreign places of birth.

== Economy ==
=== Top employers ===
According to the city's 2013 Comprehensive Annual Financial Report, the top employers in the city are:

#	Employer	# of Employees
1	Norwalk-La Mirada Unified School District	2,057
2	Cerritos College	1,570
3	Los Angeles County Registrar/Recorder	1,564
4	Metropolitan State Hospital	1,466
5	Target	442
6	City of Norwalk	409
7	Costco	317
8	Doty Brother's Construction	300
9	Coast Plaza Hospital	295
10	Los Angeles Community Hospital	250
11	Little Lake School District	242
12	Los Angeles County Sheriff's Department	240
13	Walmart	238
14	Kerber Brothers Inc	200
15	Southland Care Center	180
16	Double Tree Hotel	169
17	McDonald's	168
18	Keystone Collision Center	150
19	Prudential California Realty	150
20	US Post Office	130

== Arts and culture ==
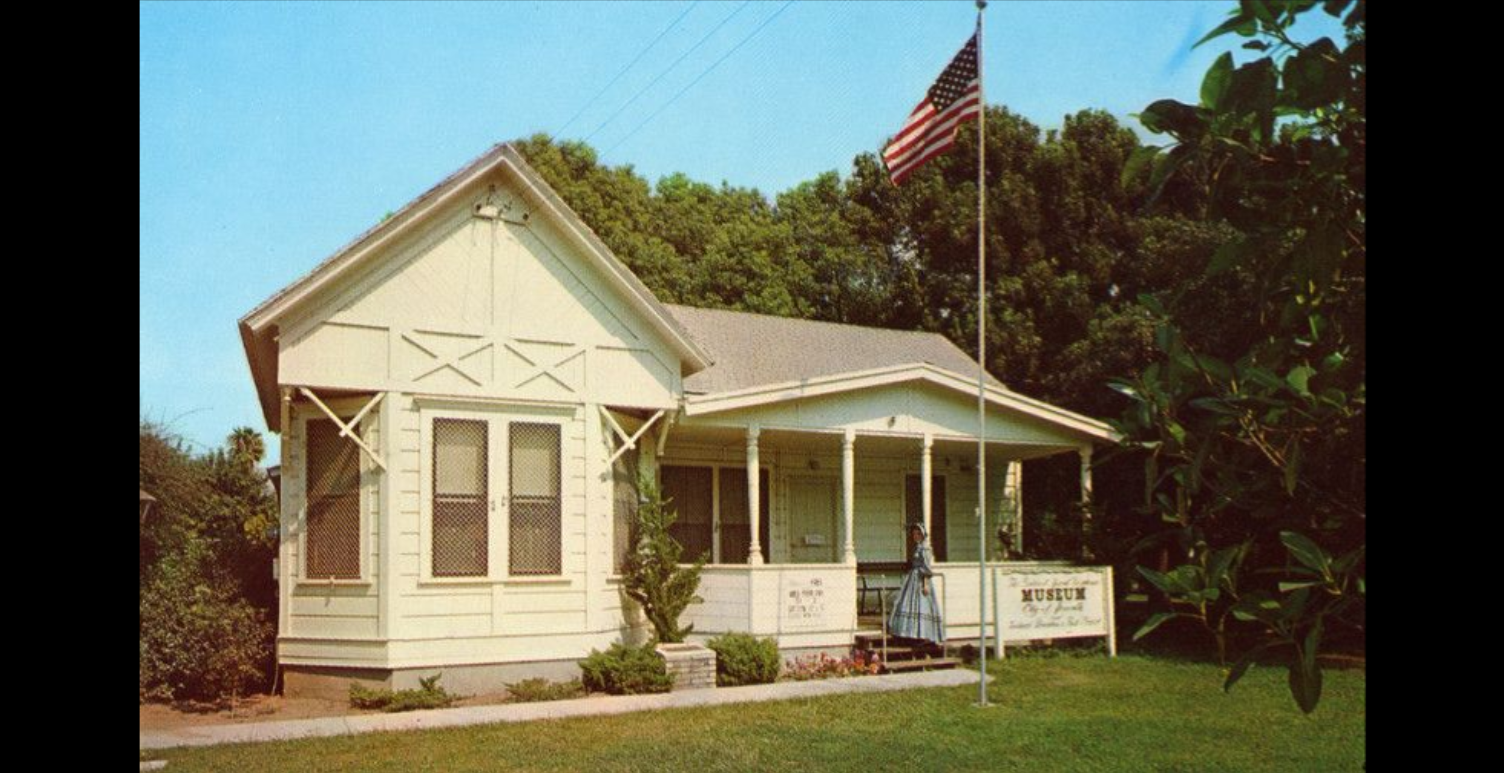
Sproul House

Historic homes include:

- Hargitt House, built in 1891 by the D.D. Johnston family, in the Victorian Eastlake style. The Hargitt House Museum is located here.
- The Sproul House, a Stick Style-influenced, Victorian farm house built in 1870 by the founder of Norwalk, Gilbert Sproul. The Gilbert Sproul Museum, which features local artifacts, is located here.

== Government ==
=== City government ===
Norwalk operates under a Council/Manager form of government, established by the Charter of the City of Norwalk which was drafted in 1957. The five-member City Council acts as the city's chief policy-making body. Every two years, Council members are elected by the citizens of Norwalk to serve four-year, overlapping terms. Council members are not limited to the number of terms they may serve. The Mayor is selected by the council and serves a one-year term.

=== County, state, and federal representation ===
In the Los Angeles County Board of Supervisors, Norwalk is in the Fourth District, represented by Janice Hahn.

In the California State Senate, Norwalk is in the 30th senatorial district, represented by Democrat Bob Archuleta. In the California State Assembly, it is in the 64th Assembly district, represented by Democrat Blanca Pacheco.

In the United States House of Representatives, Norwalk is in California's 38th congressional district, represented by Democrat Linda Sánchez.

The Los Angeles County Department of Health Services operates the Whittier Health Center in Whittier, serving Norwalk.

=== Superior Court ===
The Southeast District of the Los Angeles County Superior Court is located in Norwalk.

== Education ==
=== Community colleges ===
- Cerritos College was founded in 1955, and serves southeastern Los Angeles county. The college offers degrees and certificates in 87 areas of study in nine divisions. Over 1,200 students complete their course of studies each year.

=== Public education ===
Most of Norwalk is served by Norwalk-La Mirada Unified School District. Schools include:

- J.B. Morrison Elementary Magnet School
- Norwalk High School

Part of Norwalk are served by Little Lake City School District, Whittier Union High School District, and ABC Unified School District.

=== Private schools ===
- Saint John of God School
- Pioneer Baptist School
- Saint Linus School

== Media ==
The independent TV station KHJ-TV/KCAL-TV channel 9 was licensed to Norwalk for a year in 1989 during an ownership transfer as part of a settlement with the FCC by former owner RKO General; the one-year change in city of license was barely noted on-air (it returned to a city of license of Los Angeles in 1990), and the station never had any actual assets based in Norwalk. Los Cerritos Community News serves the city.

== Infrastructure ==
=== Transportation ===
==== Freeways ====
Three freeways travel through the city. The Santa Ana Freeway (I-5) and San Gabriel River Freeway (I-605) pass through and intersect just above its northern edge, while the Century Freeway (I-105) ends in Norwalk at Studebaker Road.

==== Norwalk Transit ====
Norwalk Transit serves Norwalk and its adjacent communities. Six bus lines operate in Norwalk and adjacent cities, including Artesia, Bellflower, Cerritos, La Mirada and Whittier. Norwalk Transit Buses make connections with Los Angeles Metro Rail C Line from Route 2 and Metrolink from Route 7

==== Long Beach Transit ====
Long Beach Transit provides service to the Metro C Line Station via Studebaker Road from Long Beach.

==== Los Angeles Metro ====
The Los Angeles County Metropolitan Transportation Authority ("Metro") provides both bus and rail service from Norwalk. The Metro C Line (formerly the Green Line) light rail provides service from the Norwalk C Line station to LAX (via shuttle from Aviation Station) and Redondo Beach. Metro bus routes provide service to the west on Florence Avenue, Firestone Boulevard, Imperial Highway, and Rosecrans Avenue from the Norwalk C Line Station. Express routes also connect to Disneyland, El Monte Bus Station, Long Beach and downtown Los Angeles.

==== Metrolink ====
Norwalk is served by the Metrolink Orange County Line and 91/Perris Valley Line at Norwalk/Santa Fe Springs station.

=== Healthcare ===
==== Metropolitan State Hospital ====
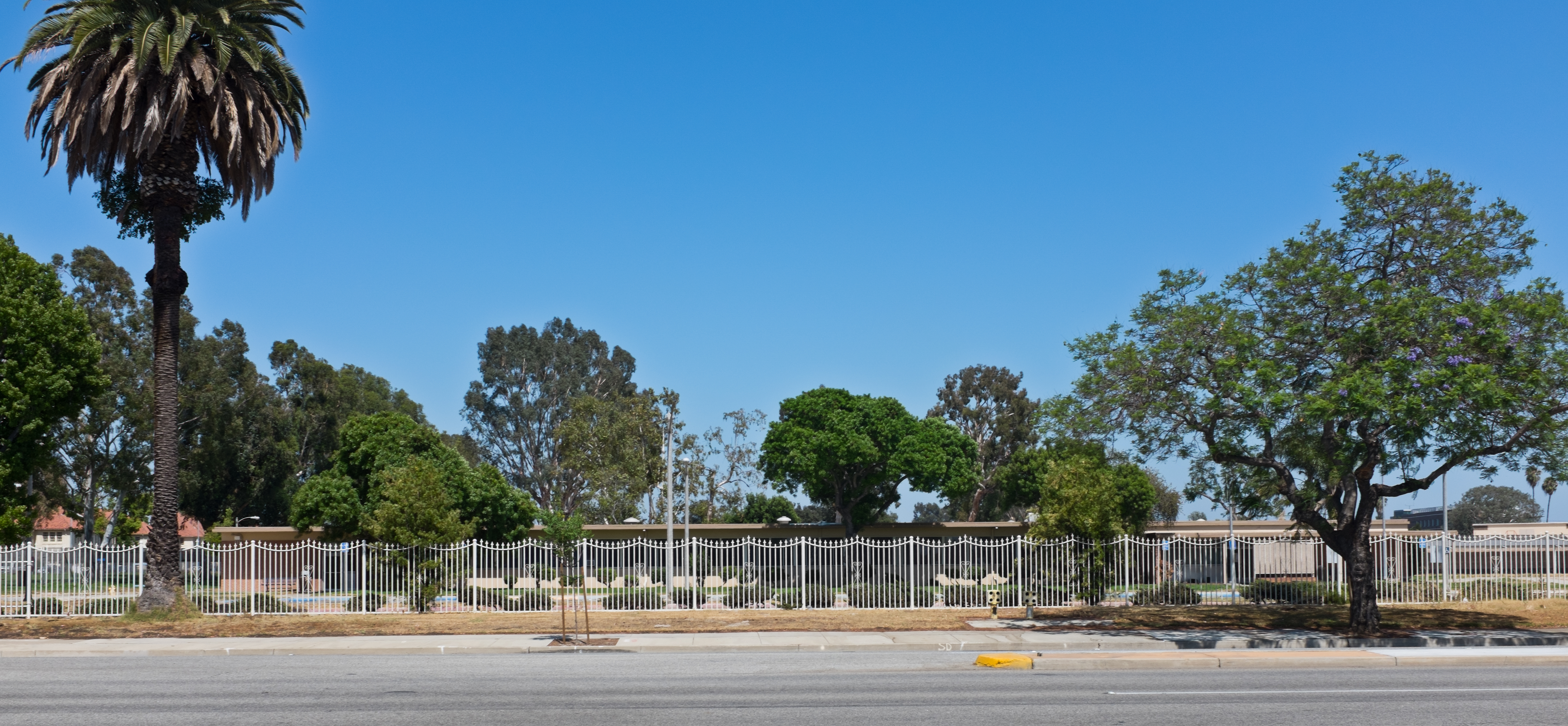
The Metropolitan State Hospital

The 162-acre (0.66 km^{2}) Metropolitan State Hospital, a psychiatric and mental health facility operated by the California Department of State Hospitals, is located in Norwalk. It has four different types of categories for patient intake. The four categories being; incompetent to stand trial (PC 1370), offender with a mental health disorder (PCS 2962/2972), not guilty by reason of insanity (PC 1026), and conservatorship lanterman-petris-short (LPS) Act.

=== Public safety ===
Norwalk is a contract city, in which the Los Angeles County Sheriff's Department provides police services. It maintains its own station, which also provides police services to La Mirada and unincorporated South Whittier. At one time the station also provided contracted police services to Santa Fe Springs, but those services ended when the city entered into a contract with the Whittier Police Department. The station is staffed with 206 sworn personnel.

Fire protection in Norwalk is provided by the Los Angeles County Fire Department with ambulance transport by Care Ambulance Service.

== Notable people ==
- Ruth Asawa, sculptor
- Shirley Babashoff, swimmer, winner of eight Olympic medals and 1975 world championship, Norwalk High School graduate, 1973
- Dick Bass, born Richard Lee Bass, played professional football as running back for Los Angeles Rams from 1960 through 1969
- William Conrad (1920–94), actor, director and producer in film and television; lived in Bellflower, graduate of Excelsior High School
- John Darnielle, musician and novelist
- Tiffany Darwish, 1980s singer and actress
- Delinquent Habits, rap group
- James Gattuso, analyst and pundit in Washington, D.C., who often appears on television and radio to give opinions on domestic policy; Excelsior High School Class of 1975
- Keith Ginter, MLB player for Houston Astros, Milwaukee Brewers, and Oakland Athletics
- Bob Kevoian, radio host, The Bob & Tom Show, Norwalk High Class of 1969
- Joseph "Mang0" Marquez, professional Super Smash Bros player and internet personality. graduate of John Glenn High School class of 2010
- Ron McGovney, the first bass player of Metallica
- Lindsay Mendez, Broadway actress
- Grace Napolitano, former U.S. representative, California state assemblywoman, and mayor of Norwalk
- Alexandra Nechita, artist, considered youngest cubist ever discovered (at age 8) and nicknamed "petite Picasso"; attended Moffit Elementary School prior to her fame when she relocated outside of Norwalk
- Pat Nixon (1912–93), First Lady of United States 1969–74, wife of President Richard Nixon; graduate of Excelsior High School Class of 1929 (family bought a truck farm in Dairy Valley, formerly in Artesia, now part of Cerritos)
- Donald Novis, actor, died in Norwalk 1966
- Rashaad Penny, running back, Seattle Seahawks
- Ron Rinehart, lead singer, Dark Angel
- Poncho Sanchez, Latin jazz artist
- Cindy Sheehan, anti-Iraq War activist
- Gene Taylor, blues-rock and boogie-woogie pianist, Norwalk High Class of 1970
- Cristina Valenzuela, voice actress
- Delta Work, drag queen and stylist
- Nikki Schieler Ziering, Playboy Playmate, actress and Ian Ziering's ex-wife
