= Brethren Christian High School =

Coordinates: 33°39′19″N 117°57′30″W

Brethren Christian Junior & Senior High School
- Huntington Beach, California; United States

Information
- Type: Private, Christian Middle/High School
- Motto: Soli Deo Gloria
- Religious affiliation: Christian
- Established: 1947
- Closed: 2020
- Staff: 50
- Grades: 6–12
- Enrollment: c. 350
- Colors: Green & white
- Athletics conference: Academy League, CIF-SS
- Team name: Warriors
- Website: www.bchs.net

Brethren Christian was a private Christian middle school and high school located in Huntington Beach, California. It was situated on a 15-acre (61,000 m^{2}) site leased from the Huntington Beach City School District, formerly the site of Gisler Middle School. The school was independently operated and controlled by a board of directors. Due to financial troubles, the school eventually dropped its middle school and relocated to the campus of Grace Lutheran Church. The school permanently closed in 2020 following a large deficit and a 64% drop in enrollment.

BCHS was accredited through both the Western Association of Schools and Colleges and the Association of Christian Schools International.

== Academics ==
Brethren Christian stated that approximately 95% of their students matriculated directly to college or university immediately following graduation. Students generally scored several years above grade level on standardized testing and nearly 200 points above state and national averages on the College Board SAT Reasoning Test.

The school offered a wide variety of academic courses, ranging from the Options Program for students needing academic assistance to Advanced Placement courses. College preparation began in the junior high program with the introduction of the MLA Handbook for Writers of Research Papers format, study skills training, and the option for advanced students to take high school level courses. The high school program provided coursework that met the University of California A-G requirements for university admissions, utilized test preparation for standardized aptitude tests from The Princeton Review, and offered opportunities for individualized planning with the academic dean and staff members.

Each student taking an Advanced Placement course was required to take the Advanced Placement Examination. The percentage of students passing with a score greater than 3 was significantly higher than the state and national averages for AP courses offered at Brethren Christian. The pass rate for the 2013 testing period was 88% and was among the highest pass rates in Orange County. Approximately 32% of eligible students took at least one AP class during the school year.

== Fine arts ==
Their Band, Drama, and Visual Art departments won awards for excellence in performance. In the 12th Annual Orange County Arts Awards hosted by Arts Orange County, Brethren Christian was named a recipient of one of five annual achievement awards. The school also received the Spark of Imagination statuette and was awarded Outstanding Arts Education Program in Orange County.

The Brethren Christian Wind Symphony, under the direction of Len Montgomery, went on a tour to New York. Competing against schools from all around the country, BCHS won gold. The high school wind symphony was named Best Large Band in the Biola University Invitational Christian High School Band Festival for many years. The 8 o'clock jazz band won 1st place in the small school division at the Reno Jazz Festival in April 2007, first place in the advanced division of the Fullerton College Jazz Festival in 2010, first place in the intermediate division of the Fullerton College Jazz Festival on April 2, 2011, and first place in the intermediate division of the Irvine Jazz Festival in 2012. The 8 o'clock jazz band was selected from among nearly thirty Orange County, California high schools to be the featured band at the 2011 Music and Arts Commendations for Youth (MACY) Awards program but declined due to other commitments. The band was named Best Student Jazz Band at the 41st Annual MACY Awards. In spring 2012, the band received 3 unanimous superior designations in competitions including the Biola University Invitational Christian High School Band Festival, the Irvine Jazz Festival, and the Southern California School Band and Orchestra Association Regional Festival.

In the 2010s, the Jazz Combo, a select group of students representing the 8 o'clock Jazz Band, participated in the annual Huntington Beach, California, Fourth of July parade. For four consecutive years, the band received the John Philip Sousa Award trophy, given to the group who demonstrates best use of music on a float.

Brethren Christian was also recognized as a leader in drama. Winner of the prestigious Music and Arts Commendations for Youth (MACY) Childress Award in 2010, their musical production of Fiddler on the Roof also received 22 individual commendations. The school also participated in "The Cappies", the Critics and Awards Program for High School Students as well as the ComedySportz High School League.

== Athletics ==
The Brethren Christian Warriors competed in the Academy League. Other teams included St. Margaret's Episcopal School, Oxford Academy, Whitney High School, Crean Lutheran High School, and Sage Hill School. BCHS had over 40 CIF-SS (California Interscholastic Federation Southern Section) championships.

During the 2010 - 2011 school year, notable athletic accomplishments include the 16th consecutive playoff berth in the Southern Section of the California Interscholastic Federation for Girls Basketball and a share of the Academy League Varsity Boys Basketball title. Girls Volleyball defeated several higher ranked schools to compete in the Southern Section California Interscholastic Federation Championship game.

It was announced in February 2011 that Brethren Christian had hired a new varsity football coach: former NFL punter and wide receiver, Pat McInally. Coach McInally has expanded the coaching staff to include other high-profile athletes including 15-year National Football League player Jesse Sapolu as Offensive Line Coach.

== Notable alumni ==
- Rich Buhler ('63) - Pastor, author, actor, radio host "Father of Christian Talk Radio" Talk From the Heart.
- Christopher Castile ('98) - Actor, Beethoven and Beethoven's 2nd.
- Reggie Davis ('94) - Former NFL tight end for the San Diego Chargers. Hired February 4, 2011 as the tight ends coach for the San Francisco 49ers.
- Michael Harper ('04) - Poet.
- Mamadou N'Diaye ('13) - Basketball player.
- Mat Vairo ('07) - Actor, Switched at Birth, CSI: Crime Scene Investigation, and Revolution.
- Daryle Ward- former MLB player (Houston Astros, Los Angeles Dodgers, Pittsburgh Pirates, Washington Nationals, Atlanta Braves, Chicago Cubs)
