= Sproul House =

Historic house in California, United States

Gilbert Sproul House
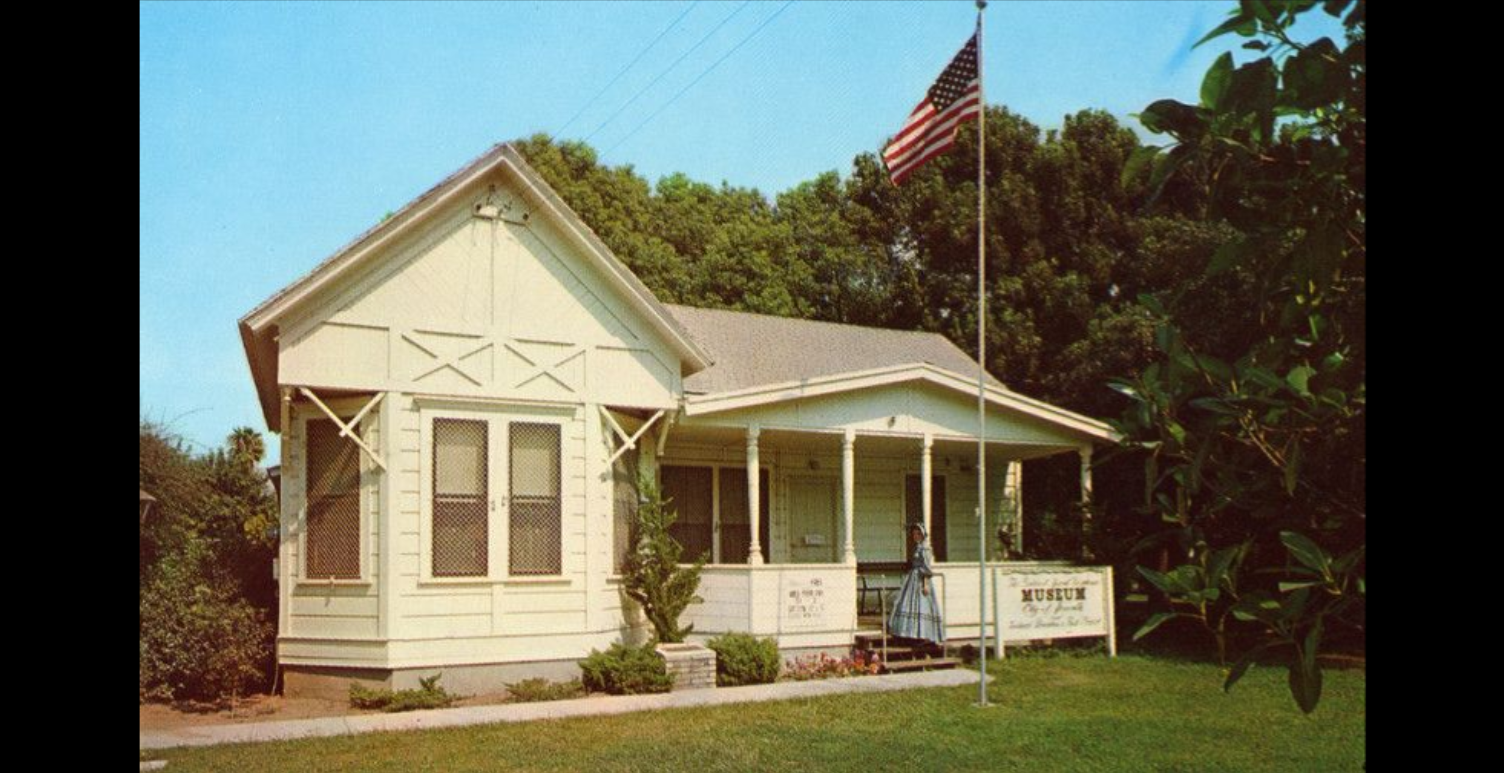
- Sproul House / Gilbert Sproul Museum

- Location within the Los Angeles metropolitan area Location within California Location within the United States
- 33°55′34.8636″N 118°4′18.2028″W
- Location: 12237 Sproul St Norwalk, California

History
- Built: 1870

Site notes
- Architect: Ashley Bliss
- Architectural styles: Stick Style, Tudor Revival
- Owner: City of Norwalk, California

Sproul House a Stick Style, Victorian farm house built in 1870 in the present-day City of Norwalk in Los Angeles County, California by the founder of the city for himself and his family. It houses the Gilbert Sproul Museum containing the family's original furniture, much of which dates back to 1870, along with one-of-a-kind materials relating to the history of Norwalk, such as maps, early school pictures, and other city photographs. In addition, there are displays of historical dolls, guns, and a rare collection of Native American artefacts.

== Early years ==
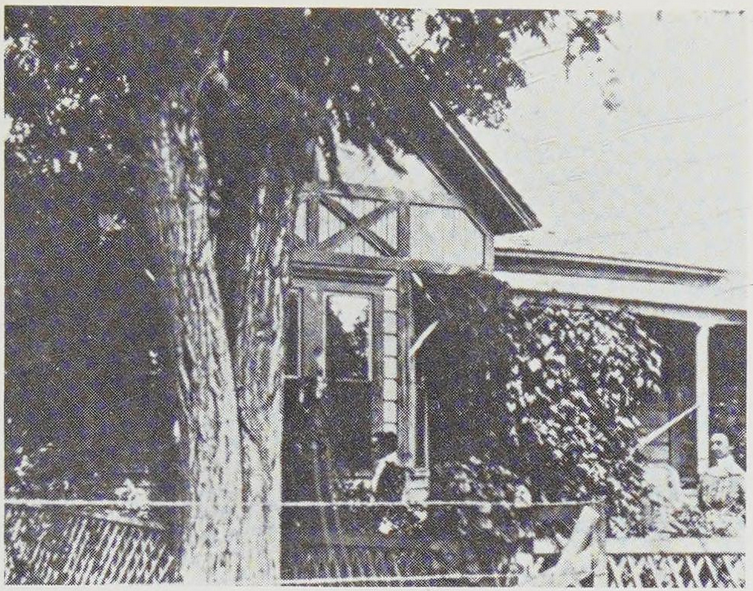
Sproul House at original site c. 1900

Gilbert Sproul's attempted settlement in Humboldt, California coincided with the Bald Hills War. After a deadly attack on his settlement by Eel River Athapaskan peoples, Sproul bought 457 acres south of Los Angeles in 1868, built a house and sent for his family. He then set about founding the city of Norwalk. Siting the house in a sycamore grove near the planned path of the Southern Pacific Rail Road(SPRR) along present day Front Street, Sproul sunk several wells which supplied the early township, attracting more residents to whom he would sell portions of the land. In 1875 Sproul deeded 20 acres to SPRR but, crucially, he included a clause compelling SPRR to maintain train service to Sproul's Station where they had previously refused to stop. The grove and house became the site of civic cultural events as well as official city business The town's commercial and civic center grew between the Sproul house and station, and the area remains a main civic and commercial center of the city to this day.

== The Sproul Museum ==
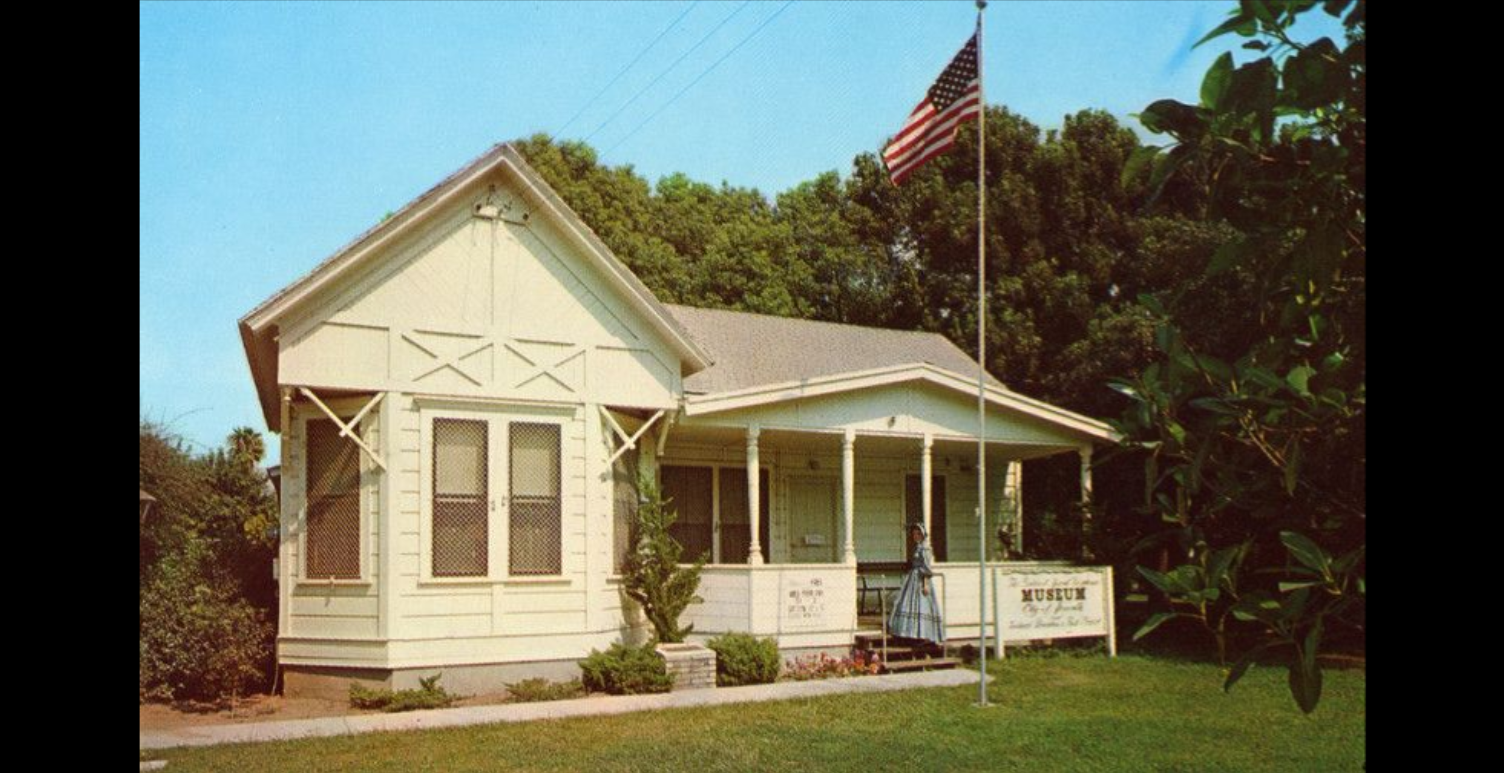
Sproul House

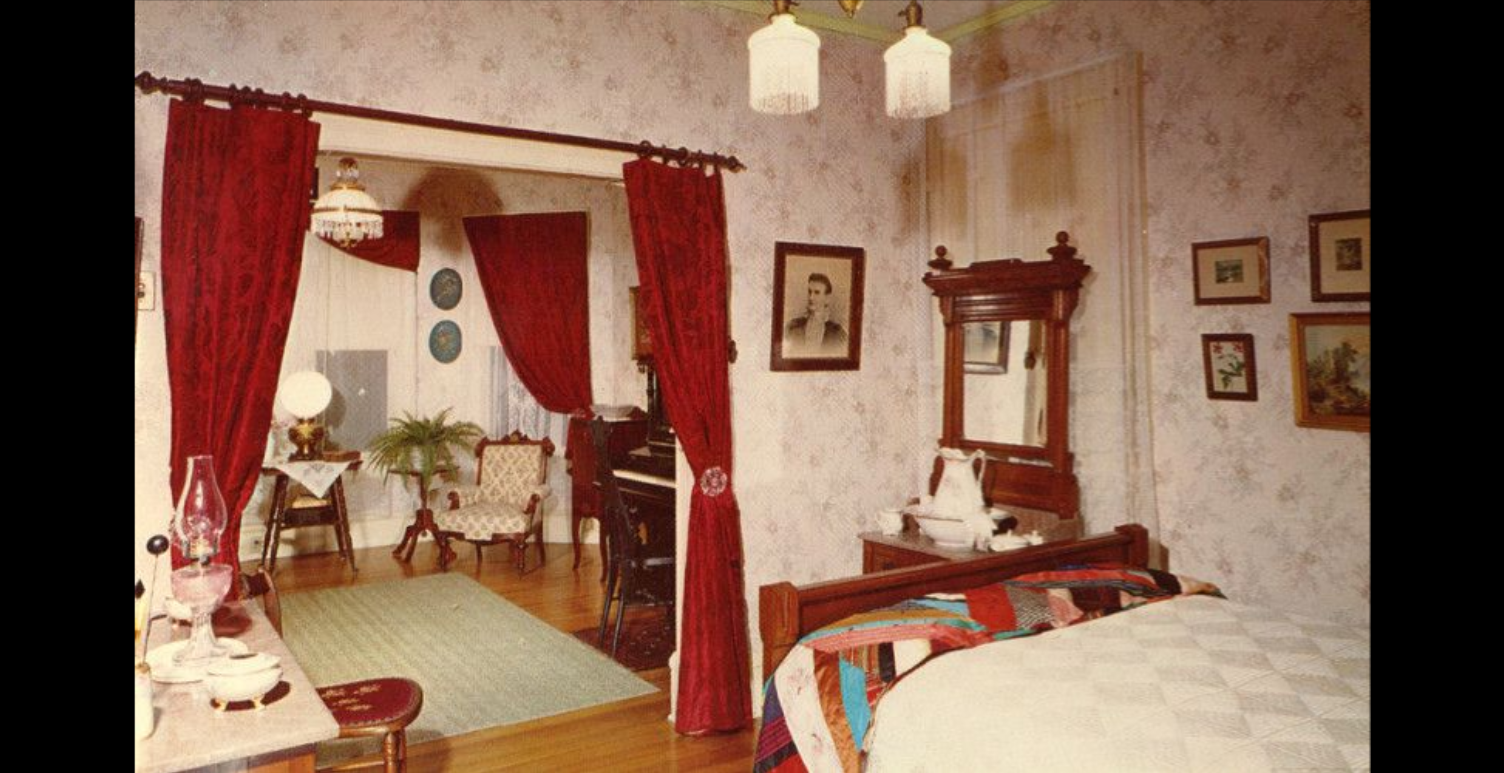
View of bedroom and parlor

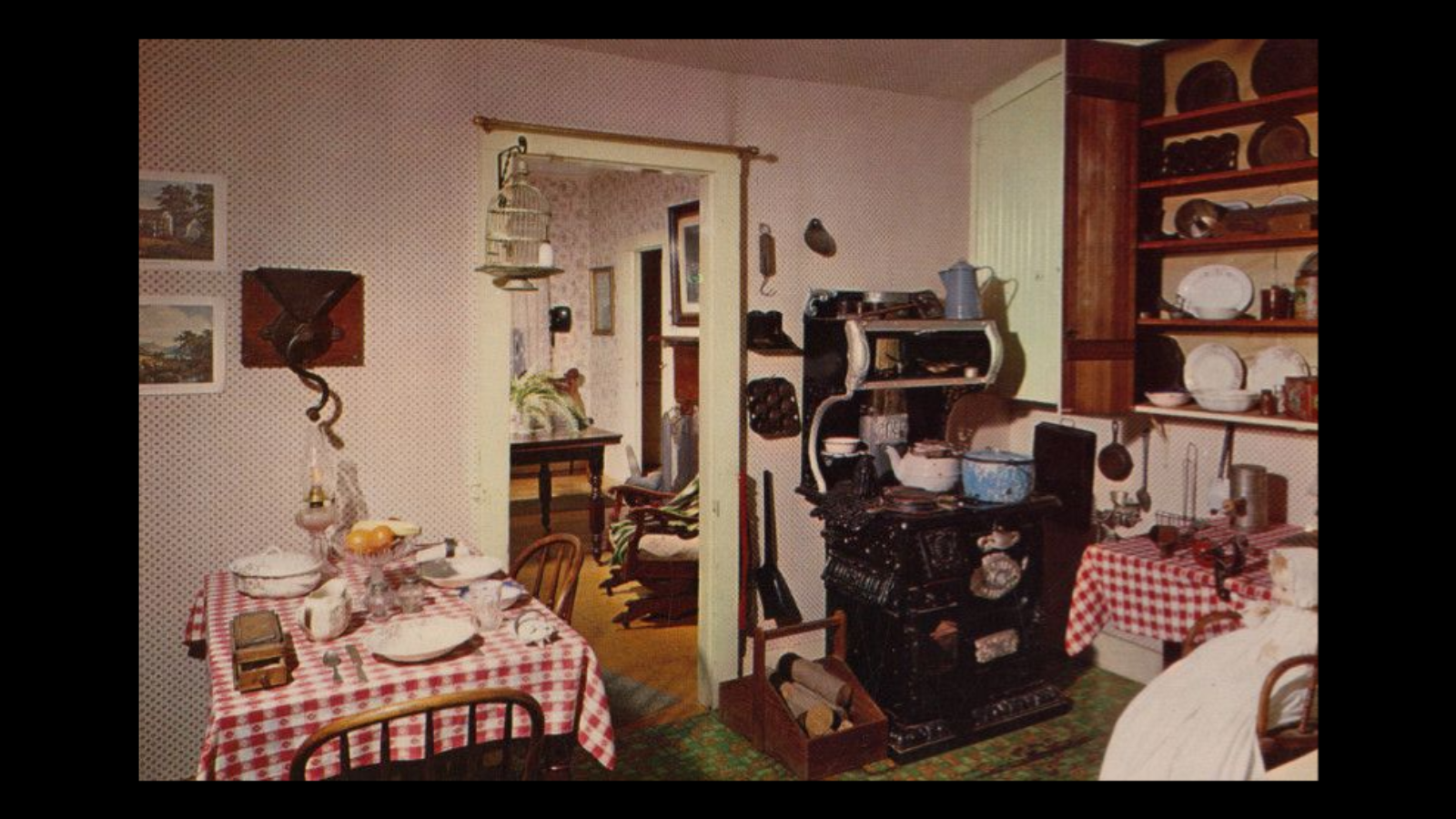
Kitchen with view of bedroom through door

In 1962, descendant Vida Sproul donated the house to the City of Norwalk and it became the centerpiece of a large historical park and museum showcasing the city's history. The house was moved within its historic lot to approximately 100 yards from its previous location, a historic reproduction barn was built next to it, and corrals populated with farm animals were added. The farm actually raised and produced beef to help fund itself. The whole complex was opened to the public as a museum in 1964. In 1973 the barn exhibit and grounds were improved to look more like a western style rancho barn, and another exhibit was added inside the barn illustrating the agricultural period of Norwalk through equipment, implements and tools arranged in various interpretive displays. The Sproul Historic Park now boasted the Gilbert Sproul House Museum, the Norwalk Animal Farm and the Interpretive Barn exhibit.
