= Fou Fonoti =

American football player (born 1991)

No. 62, 66
- Position: Offensive lineman

Personal information
- Born: November 15, 1991 (age 34); Lakewood, California, U.S.
- Listed height: 6 ft 4 in (1.93 m)
- Listed weight: 310 lb (141 kg)

Career information
- High school: Mayfair (Lakewood)
- College: Michigan State
- NFL draft: 2014: undrafted

Career history
- 2014: San Francisco 49ers
- 2015: Toronto Argonauts
- Stats at Pro Football Reference
- Stats at CFL.ca (archive)

Fouimalo "Fou" Fonoti (born November 15, 1991) is an American former professional football player who was an offensive lineman for the Toronto Argonauts of the Canadian Football League (CFL). He played college football for the Michigan State Spartans. He was also a member of the San Francisco 49ers of the National Football League (NFL).

== Early life ==
Fonoti played high school football at Mayfair High School in Lakewood, California. He was invited to play in two postseason all-star games after his senior season and was named to the Long Beach Press-Telegram Dream Team. He was also a second-team all-state selection and garnered Suburban League Offensive Lineman of the Year accolades his senior season in 2008. Fonoti earned All-CIF and first-team all-league honors while being recognized on the Alga Foundation All-Star Team his junior year. He was also voted into the Lakewood Youth Hall of Fame.

== College career ==
Fonoti first played college football at Cerritos College. He played in eleven games, starting ten, his freshman year in 2009 and earned second-team all-conference honors. He garnered All-California Region IV and First-team All-National Division Northern Conference recognition in 2010. Fonoti helped the Cerritos Falcons to an 18–5 record during his two years with the team. He earned JCFootball.com/JC Grid-Wire and Super Prep JUCO All-American honors. He was also named a California Community College Football Coaches Association All-American. Fonoti was rated as the fourth best JUCO offensive lineman and the 32nd best overall JUCO player by SuperPrep.

Fonoti then transferred to play for the Michigan State Spartans under Mark Dantonio, where he was a three-year letterman. He started the last eleven games of the 2011 season at right tackle. He totaled 31 knockdowns and played 659 snaps without allowing a sack. Fonoti played 136 snaps in the first two games of 2012 and was credited with seven knockdowns before breaking his foot in practice prior to the Notre Dame game in Week 3, causing him to miss the rest of the season. He was then medically redshirted. He received the MSU Football Player Association's Community Service & Outreach Award in 2012. Fonoti played in all fourteen games, starting the last eleven games of the season, for the Spartans his senior year in 2013 and earned honorable mention All-Big Ten honors after recording 45 knockdowns. Fonoti was also nominated for the Allstate Good Works Team for his community service work in 2013. He played in 30 games, starting 24 at right tackle, during his time at Michigan State.

== Professional career ==
Pre-draft measurables
| Height | Weight | 40-yard dash | 10-yard split | 20-yard split | 20-yard shuttle | Three-cone drill | Vertical jump | Broad jump | Bench press |
|---|---|---|---|---|---|---|---|---|---|
| 6 ft 4 in (1.93 m) | 308 lb (140 kg) | 5.12 s | 1.78 s | 2.93 s | 4.69 s | 7.66 s | 28 1/2 in (0.72 m) | 8 ft 10 in (2.69 m) | 24 reps |
All values from Michigan State Pro Day

Fonoti signed with the San Francisco 49ers on May 10, 2014 after going undrafted in the 2014 NFL draft. He was waived/injured by the team on July 29 after suffering a season-ending leg injury during practice on July 27, 2014. He was placed on injured reserve on July 30, 2014. Fonoti was released by the 49ers on April 30, 2015.

Fonoti was signed to the Toronto Argonauts' practice roster in September 2015. He was promoted to the active roster on October 21, 2015. He played in one game for the team during the 2015 season. Fonoti was released by the Argonauts on June 19, 2016.

== Personal life ==
Fonoti is the cousin of football players Tupe Peko and Domata Peko. Fou's cousin Christian Matau played football for the East Carolina Pirates.
