= Artesia High School (California) =

Location
- 12108 East Del Amo Boulevard; Lakewood, California 90715; United States
- Coordinates: 33°50′44″N 118°04′30″W

Information
- School type: Public high school
- Founded: 1954
- School board: ABC Unified School District
- Superintendent: Toan Nguyen
- Principal: Sergio Garcia
- Staff: 73.54 (FTE)
- Grades: 9-12
- Enrollment: 1,441 (2023–2024)
- Student to teacher ratio: 19.59
- Language: English
- Colors: Black and red
- Athletics conference: 605 League
- Team name: Pioneers
- Website: www.artesiahs.us

Artesia High School is a public high school in Lakewood, California, with a student population of around 1,500. It is one of the five high schools in the ABC Unified School District.

== History ==
Construction of Artesia High was completed in 1954, making it the oldest active high school in the ABC Unified School District since the 1979 closure of Excelsior High School, then known as the Excelsior Union High School District. While originally in Artesia, California, since the realigning of city boundaries, it is now located about one-half mile (0.80 km) south of the southern border of Artesia, in Lakewood.

The opening ceremony of the school was highlighted with a speech by then-Vice President Richard Nixon. In his speech he expressed his hope that Artesia High School would serve as an example of educational integration, in light of the Brown v. Board of Education ruling passed only a few months before. The school mascot is the Pioneer.

== Academics ==
The school is part of the Mathematics, Engineering, Science Achievement program and is under the direct guidance of California State University, Long Beach. The school's 2009 Academic Performance Index score was 745. In 2013, Artesia High was designated as a California Distinguished School.

=== Athletics ===
Artesia High School is a member of the 605 League of the CIF Southern Section and is renowned for its competitive sports teams. The boys' basketball team, which featured future NBA All-Star James Harden, was ranked first in California during the 2005–2006 season. The school won the CIF Division III championship with a record of 33 wins and a single loss. The 2006 win was the second time in the school's history that the team won the California Basketball championship. The Pioneers have a total of 5 state championships, ranking fourth in the state in terms of state championships.

On March 24, 2007, the boys' basketball team defeated Bishop O'Dowd High School from Oakland for the CIF Division III State Championship title, and celebrated Artesia's second back-to-back D-III title and fifth overall state championship.

== Notable alumni ==
- Joel Adamson – former professional baseball player in the Major League Baseball (MLB)
- Memo Arzate – former professional soccer player, graduated 1999
- Stephen Burton – former professional football player in the National Football League (NFL), graduated 2007
- Tony Farmer – professional basketball player in the National Basketball Association (NBA)
- James Harden – professional basketball player in the National Basketball Association (NBA)
- Ed Hodge – former professional baseball player in the Major League Baseball (MLB)
- Jason Kapono – former professional basketball player in the National Basketball Association (NBA)
- Abner Mares – professional boxer
- Jack Michael Martínez – former professional basketball player with the Dominican Republic national basketball team
- Armando Muniz – former Olympic and professional boxer
- Ed O'Bannon – former professional basketball player in the National Basketball Association (NBA)
- Charles O'Bannon – former professional basketball player in the National Basketball Association (NBA)
- Ryan Reyes – former professional basketball player in the Philippine Basketball Association (PBA)
- Orlando Scandrick – former professional football player in the National Football League (NFL)
- Jón Arnór Stefánsson – professional basketball player
- Tom Tolbert – former NBA player and analyst, sports talk show host
- Dick Wantz – former professional baseball player in the Major League Baseball (MLB)
