= Reggie Davis (tight end) =

American football player and coach (born 1975)

No. 84
- Position: Tight end

Personal information
- Born: September 3, 1976 (age 50); Long Beach, California, U.S.
- Listed height: 6 ft 3 in (1.91 m)
- Listed weight: 233 lb (106 kg)

Career information
- High school: Huntington Beach (CA) Brethren Christian
- College: Washington
- NFL draft: 1999: undrafted

Career history

Playing
- San Diego Chargers (1999–2000)

Coaching
- San Diego (2004) Tight ends coach; UNLV (2005–2007) Running backs coach; Oregon State (2008–2010) Running backs coach; San Francisco 49ers (2011–2013) Tight ends coach; San Francisco 49ers (2013–2014) Assistant offensive line coach; Nebraska (2015–2017) Running backs coach; HSAA (2019) Head coach; St. Louis BattleHawks (2020) Running backs coach; Nike Dallas Football Club (2020) Running backs coach; Arlington Renegades (2023–2025) Running backs coach

Awards and highlights
- XFL champion (2023); Second-team All-Pac-10 (1997)

Career NFL statistics
- Receptions: 13
- Yards: 145
- Touchdowns: 1
- Stats at Pro Football Reference

Reginald DeSean Davis (born September 3, 1976) is an American former professional football player who was a tight end in the National Football League (NFL). He recently serves as the running backs coach for the Dallas Renegades of the United Football League (UFL). He was signed by the San Diego Chargers as an undrafted free agent in 1999. He played college football for the Washington Huskies.

Davis was hired by the University of Nebraska on January 2, 2015.

On January 11, 2020, Davis was hired by the St. Louis BattleHawks to be their running backs coach.

Davis was officially hired by the Arlington Renegades on September 13, 2022.
