= John Glenn High School (California) =

Coordinates: 33°54′31″N 118°03′15″W

Location
- 13520 Shoemaker Avenue; Norwalk, California 90650; United States

Information
- Opened: c.1962
- School district: Norwalk-La Mirada Unified School District
- Principal: Jennifer Padilla
- Grades: 9–12
- Enrollment: 945 (2023-2024)
- Campus type: suburban
- Colors: Red, white and blue
- Athletics conference: 605 League
- Teams: Eagles
- Website: johnglenn.nlmusd.org

John Glenn High School is a public high school located in Norwalk, California and part of the Norwalk-La Mirada Unified School District. Its athletics participate in the 605 League of the CIF Southern Section. The school colors are red, white, and blue. The school's team nickname is the Eagles. The school was named after astronaut and future U.S. senator John Glenn. Glenn High School opened in 1963. First graduating class was 1965.

== Notable alumni ==
- Joseph Marquez (class of 2010) - professional Super Smash Bros. Melee player, better known as Mang0
- Tommy Moore (class of 1967) - MLB pitcher
- Bob Newton (class of 1967) - NFL player
- Tom Maggard (class of 1968) - 1st round draft pick by the Boston Red Sox in the 1968 Major League Baseball draft
