= Norwalk–La Mirada Unified School District =

School district in California, United States

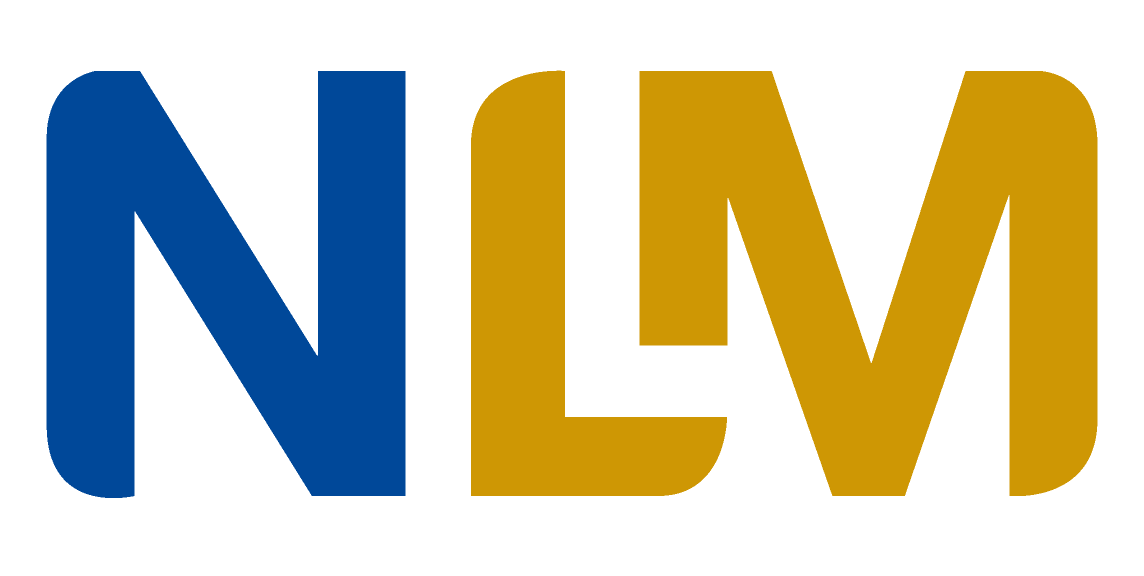

Address
- 12820 Pioneer Boulevard Southeastern Los Angeles County Norwalk, California, 90650; United States

District information
- Type: Public
- Motto: Every Student. Future Ready. Our Promise!
- Grades: K–12
- Established: 1965
- Superintendent: John Lopez
- Schools: 31
- Budget: $227 million (2019-2020)
- NCES District ID: 0627690

Students and staff
- Students: 16,209 (2020–2021)
- Teachers: 693.57 (FTE)
- Staff: 885.49 (FTE)
- Student–teacher ratio: 23.37:1

Other information
- Website: www.nlmusd.org

The Norwalk–La Mirada Unified School District (NLMUSD) is a school district in Los Angeles County, California, United States, with its headquarters in Norwalk. It has schools in both Norwalk and La Mirada areas. The school district serves most of Norwalk and La Mirada and Santa Fe Springs (the NLM portion of Santa Fe Springs contains only business areas, no residents). John Lopez has been the superintendent of the school district since the 2020–2021 school year.

== List of Schools ==
=== Elementary schools ===
- Gardenhill Elementary School, La Mirada
- John Foster Dulles Elementary School, La Mirada
- Foster Road Elementary School, La Mirada
- Escalona Elementary School, La Mirada
- New River Elementary School, Norwalk
- Arturo Sanchez Elementary School, Norwalk
- Earl E. Edmondson Elementary School, Norwalk
- Eastwood Elementary School, La Mirada
- La Pluma Elementary School, La Mirada
- John Dolland Elementary School, Norwalk
- Anna M. Glazier Elementary School, Norwalk
- D.D. Johnston Elementary School, Norwalk
- Loretta Lampton Elementary School, Norwalk
- Thomas B. Moffitt Elementary School, Norwalk
- Julia M. Morrison Elementary School, Norwalk
- John H. Nuffer Elementary School, Norwalk

=== Middle schools ===
- Arlie F. Hutchinson Middle School (STEM Academy), La Mirada
- Benton Middle School Visual and Performing Arts Academy, La Mirada
- Corvallis Middle School of Arts & Technology Magnet, Norwalk
- Los Alisos STEM Magnet Middle School, Norwalk
- Nettie L. Waite Middle School, Norwalk

=== Adult schools ===
- Excelsior Adult School

=== High schools ===
- John H. Glenn High School, Norwalk
- La Mirada High School, La Mirada
- Norwalk High School, Norwalk

=== Continuation school ===
- El Camino High School, La Mirada
