= Fonoti (surname) =

Fonoti is a surname. Notable people with the surname include:

- Fou Fonoti (born 1991), American football player
- Toniu Fonoti (born 1981), American football player
