= Keith McGill =

American football player (born 1989)

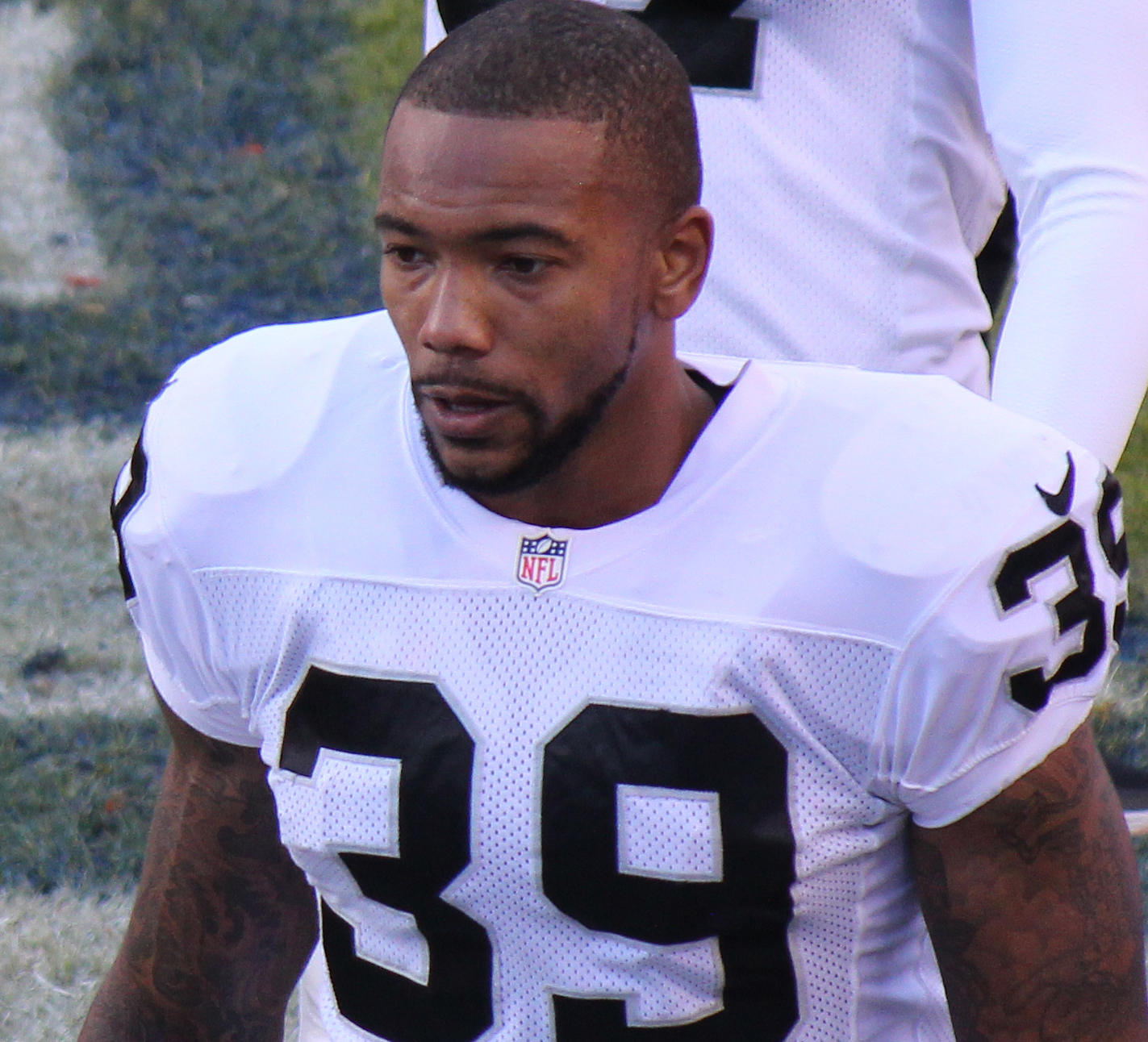
- McGill with the Oakland Raiders in 2014

No. 39
- Position: Safety

Personal information
- Born: March 9, 1989 (age 37); La Mirada, California, U.S.
- Listed height: 6 ft 3 in (1.91 m)
- Listed weight: 211 lb (96 kg)

Career information
- High school: La Mirada
- College: Utah
- NFL draft: 2014: 4th round, 116th overall pick

Career history
- Oakland Raiders (2014–2017); Salt Lake Stallions (2019)

Career NFL statistics
- Total tackles: 40
- Fumble recoveries: 1
- Pass deflections: 2
- Defensive touchdowns: 1
- Stats at Pro Football Reference

Keith William McGill II (born March 9, 1989) is an American former professional football player who was a safety for the Oakland Raiders of the National Football League (NFL). He played college football for the Utah Utes and was selected by the Raiders in the fourth round of the 2014 NFL draft and played for them until 2017. McGill spent one season with the Salt Lake Stallions of the Alliance of American Football in 2019.

== Early life ==
McGill attended La Mirada High School in La Mirada, California, where he earned letters in football, track and basketball. He played in 10 games his senior year (06-07) racking up 20 total tackles and 1 interception on defense on top of his 516 yards rushing and 297 yards receiving with 7 touchdowns.

== College career ==
He played his freshman season at Cerritos College in 2009 as a free safety. He posted 30 tackles and five interceptions. In 2010, he led the team with seven interceptions and posted 37 tackles, earning himself Northern Conference Defensive Player of the Year, and was named to the first-team All-American by CCCFA following his sophomore season.

He committed to Utah, after being named one of the best junior college prospects of his class by Rivals.com.

In 2011, his first season with the Utes, he played in five games as a safety before suffering an injury during the Arizona State game that forced him to miss the rest of the season. He missed the entire 2012 NCAA season due to lengthy, ongoing rehab of his shoulder surgery. As a senior, he started all 12 games at cornerback, amassing 37 total tackles, with 12 pass break ups and an interception returned for a touchdown, and was named an honorable mention All-Pac-12 Conference selection.

== Professional career ==
Pre-draft measurables
Height	Weight	Arm length	Hand span	40-yard dash	10-yard split	20-yard split	20-yard shuttle	Three-cone drill	Vertical jump	Broad jump	Bench press
6 ft 3 in (1.91 m)	211 lb (96 kg)	33 1/4 in (0.84 m)	10 1/4 in (0.26 m)	4.51 s	1.60 s	2.71 s	4.13 s	6.90 s	39.0 in (0.99 m)	10 ft 6 in (3.20 m)	12 reps
Vertical jump result from NFL Combine. Other values from Pro Day workout.

McGill was selected by the Oakland Raiders in the fourth round, 116th overall, of the 2014 NFL draft. On December 27, 2014, McGill scored his first career touchdown against the Denver Broncos on an 18-yard fumble return.

McGill signed with the Salt Lake Stallions of the Alliance of American Football for the 2019 season.
