= La Mirada High School =

Location
- 13520 Adelfa Drive; La Mirada, California; USA; 33.90806°N 118.0027°W

Information
- Type: Public high school
- Motto: Heart Pride Trust
- Established: 1960
- School district: Norwalk-La Mirada Unified School District
- Principal: Webster
- Teaching staff: 74.06 (FTE)
- Grades: 9-12
- Enrollment: 1,748 (2023-2024)
- Student to teacher ratio: 23.60
- Campus: Urban
- Colors: Royal Blue and gold
- Mascot: Matador
- Nickname: Matadores
- Newspaper: El Toro
- Website: La Mirada High School Website

La Mirada High School is a public high school in La Mirada, California. It is a member school of the Norwalk-La Mirada Unified School District which was built in 1960 as one of three high schools in the district. After the Norwalk/La Mirada School District voted to close William N. Neff High School in 1980, Neff High School students began attending La Mirada High School in the Fall of 1981. Since then, La Mirada High School has been the only high school in La Mirada.

== Description ==
The school's buildings are arranged in a circular position due to the limited amount of space at its location. The school also contains a full sized football field with an athlete standard running track. The campus also features both baseball and softball fields. It is one of a handful of high school tracks equipped to run the steeplechase, and it shares that resource with Biola University.

== Notable alumni ==
- Tony Brown (2016), NFL Player
- Henry Corrales (2004), Featherweight mixed martial artist currently competing in Bellator MMA
- Jennie Finch (1998), former softball pitcher for University of Arizona and Team USA
- Elijah Hicks (2017), NFL player with the Chicago Bears
- Jim Hough (1974), former NFL offensive lineman and long snapper, Minnesota Vikings
- Gabrielle LeDoux (1966), lawyer and member of Alaska House of Representatives
- Jared Jones (2020), pitcher for the Pittsburgh Pirates
- Keith McGill (2007), cornerback for Oakland Raiders, selected 116th overall in 2014 NFL draft
- Daniel Ponce de Leon (2010), former MLB pitcher
- Amber Riley (2004), actress and singer best known for her role on television series Glee as Mercedes Jones
- Ryan Vargas, NASCAR driver
- Derrick Williams (2009), second overall pick in 2011 NBA draft
- Gerald Michenauld (1974), child actor, director, producer, executive producer, writer
