= Suburban League (California) =

High school athletic league in California

The Mid-Cities League is a high school athletic conference in southeastern Los Angeles County, California affiliated with the CIF Southern Section. The Mid-Cities league was launched in 2022, replacing the Suburban League.

== Schools ==
As of the 2022-23 school year, the members in the league are:

- Norwalk High School, Norwalk, California
- Firebaugh High School
- Gahr High School
- Lynwood High School
- Paramount High School
- Compton Early College High School

In the past Artesia High, Cabrillo High, Cerritos High, Gahr High, John Glenn, La Serna High, Monte Vista High, Neff High School and Sierra High Schools were members of the league.
