= Del Rio League =

High school athletic league in Los Angeles County, California, United States

The Del Rio League is a high school athletic league that is part of the CIF Southern Section. Members are located around Whittier in Los Angeles County. The league was created at the start of the 1992-93 school year, replacing the Whitmont League.

== Members ==
- California High School
- El Rancho High School
- La Serna High School
- Santa Fe High School
- Whittier High School
