= Academy League =

Californian high school athletic league

The Academy League is a defunct high school athletic league in Orange County that is part of the CIF Southern Section.

== Members ==
As of 2019 the current members of the league are:

- Brethren Christian High School
- Capistrano Valley Christian High School
- Liberty Christian High School
- Pacifica Christian High School
- Saddleback Valley Christian Schools
- Sage Hill School
- Tarbut V' Torah
