= Oxford Academy (California) =

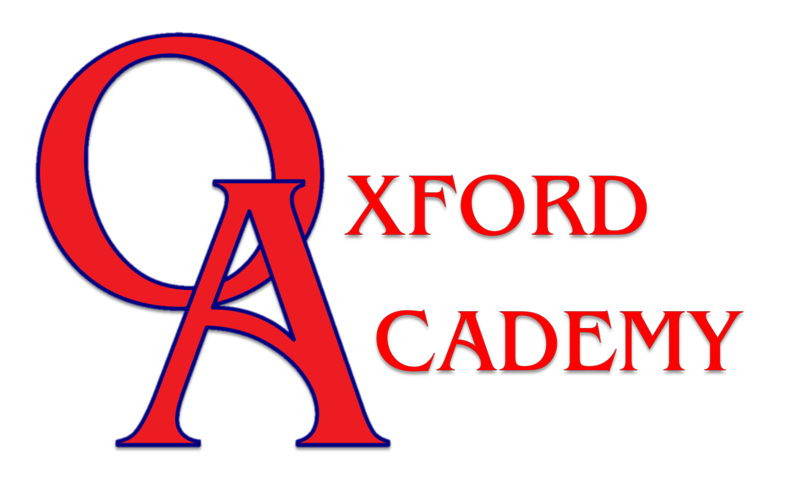

Location
- 5172 Orange Avenue; Cypress, California 90630; United States; 33°49′25″N 118°2′33″W

Information
- School type: Public, Secondary School, Magnet School
- Motto: Oxford Academy is a community of innovators dedicated to nurturing the holistic growth of life-long learners who will lead and serve an evolving local and global society.
- Established: c. 1998
- School district: Anaheim Union High School District
- Superintendent: Jaron Fried
- Principal: Amber Houston
- Teaching staff: 51.70 (on an FTE basis)
- Grades: 7-12
- Enrollment: 1,315 (2024-25)
  - Grade 7: 265
  - Grade 8: 233
  - Grade 9: 214
  - Grade 10: 212
  - Grade 11: 190
  - Grade 12: 201
- Student to teacher ratio: 24.92
- Campus type: Large Suburb
- Colors: Red, White, Blue
- Athletics conference: 605 League; CIF Southern Section
- Mascot: Paul the Patriot
- Nickname: Patriots
- Rival: Whitney High School
- Newspaper: The Gamut
- Yearbook: Spiritus
- Website: oxford.auhsd.us

Oxford Academy, commonly stylized as OA, is a public magnet school in Cypress, California serving grades 7–12 as part of the Anaheim Union High School District.

As of 2026, the school was ranked #2 for the best high schools in California by U.S. News & World Report, as well as #19 for the best U.S. high schools.

== History ==
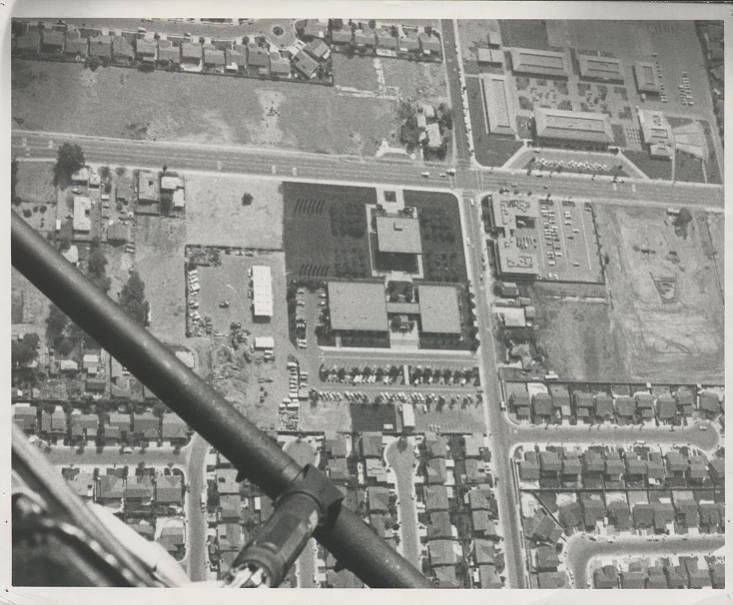
Aerial view, looking SSE of Oxford Junior High School (top right) in the 1960s. Showcased is the intersection of Orange Avenue and Grindlay St, with the newly built Cypress Civic Center seen at the bottom left quadrant.

Built in 1960 on the corner of Orange Ave and Grindlay St in Cypress, Oxford Academy's campus originally served as the location of the Anaheim Union High School District's new middle school, Oxford Junior High School. Established in 1965, the school served an area which was rapidly transforming from mostly agricultural to suburban single-family homes. However, with the opening of other schools nearby, such as Oak Junior High in 1962 and Pine Junior High (now McAuliffe Middle School) in 1967, declining enrollment caused the school's closure soon after in 1980. Afterwards, the campus was leased to the city of Cypress and hosted various institutions for brief periods of time, including a satellite campus for Barclay College and the Cypress Cultural Arts Center. In 1990, the city leased the site to Brethren Christian, a private Christian junior and senior high school; during this time the playing fields were used jointly by the school's football team as well as LA and Orange County youth soccer leagues. In 1996, the district voted to end the lease to Brethren Christian by the 1998–99 school year. In response to district-wide school overcrowding, AUHSD officials proposed starting a college-prep academy, with the city of Cypress offering $80,000 towards renovating the fields and multipurpose room. Finally, in the fall of 1998, administrators reopened the site as Oxford Academy, a magnet school serving AUHSD students. Although some administrators and teachers expressed concern that the new school would poach the best students from schools around the district, they decided ultimately that the competition would be beneficial, not only for those high-achieving students at Oxford but also for other schools aiming to keep pace.

Ever since its inception in 1998, the school has undergone a number of modernization efforts to renovate old facilities and add new buildings to accommodate the larger student body. The first major expansion came in 2006 when the gymnasium and English buildings were built, the tennis and basketball courts were upgraded, and the old outdoor amphitheater was removed. In 2018, the school added extra security, including a perimeter gate preventing public visitors from entering freely for the first time since the campus was built. In 2020, Oxford opened 2 new buildings for STEM education and performing arts. In 2022, plans were approved on a solar panel structure covering the parking lot, with construction completing in 2025. In 2023, renovation of the existing portable classrooms as well as the construction of 4 more portable classrooms began, with renovation efforts being completed in 2024 and construction completing in 2025.

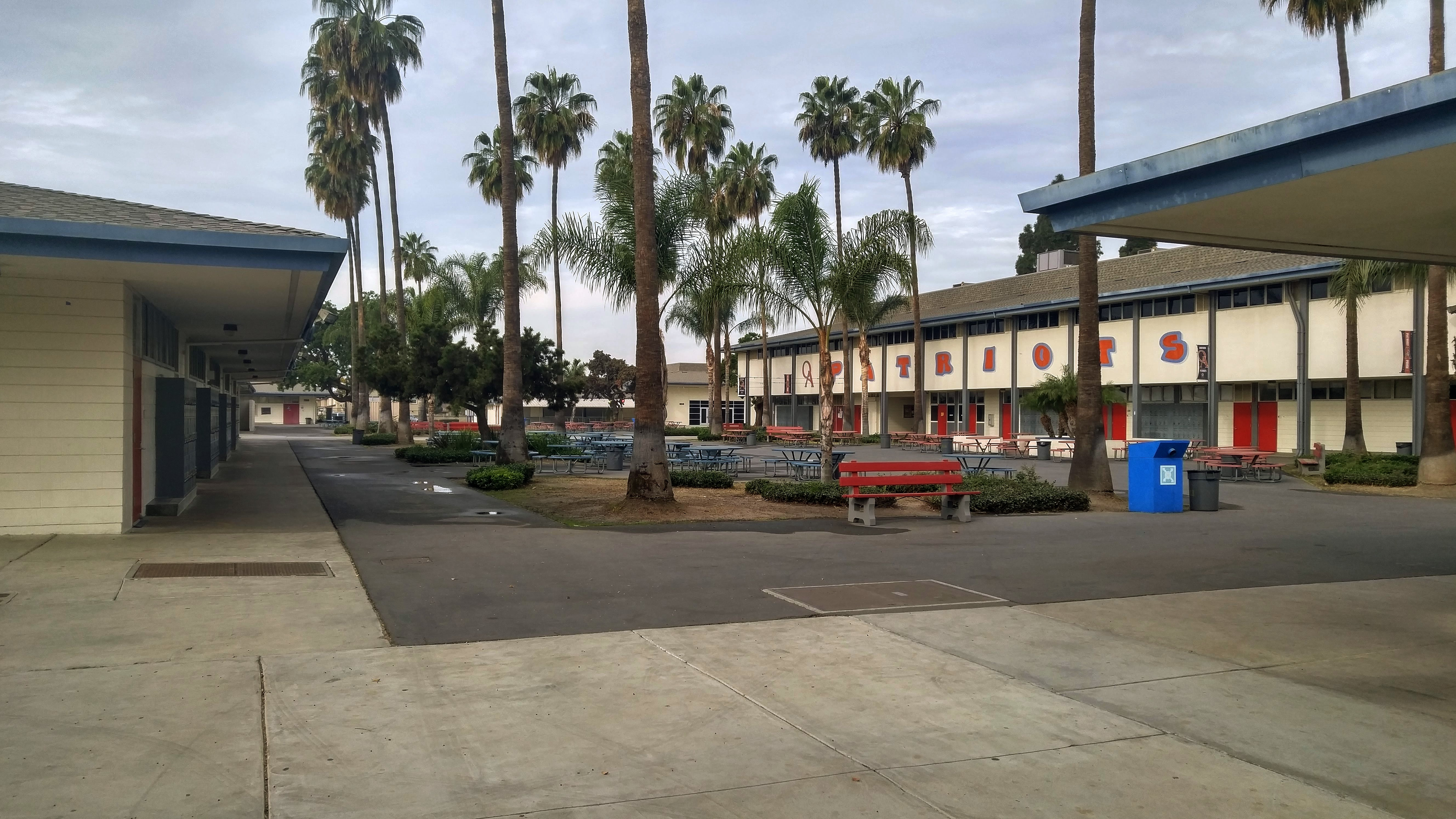
A view of Oxford's quad in 2018. The old red and blue circular lunch tables are visible here.

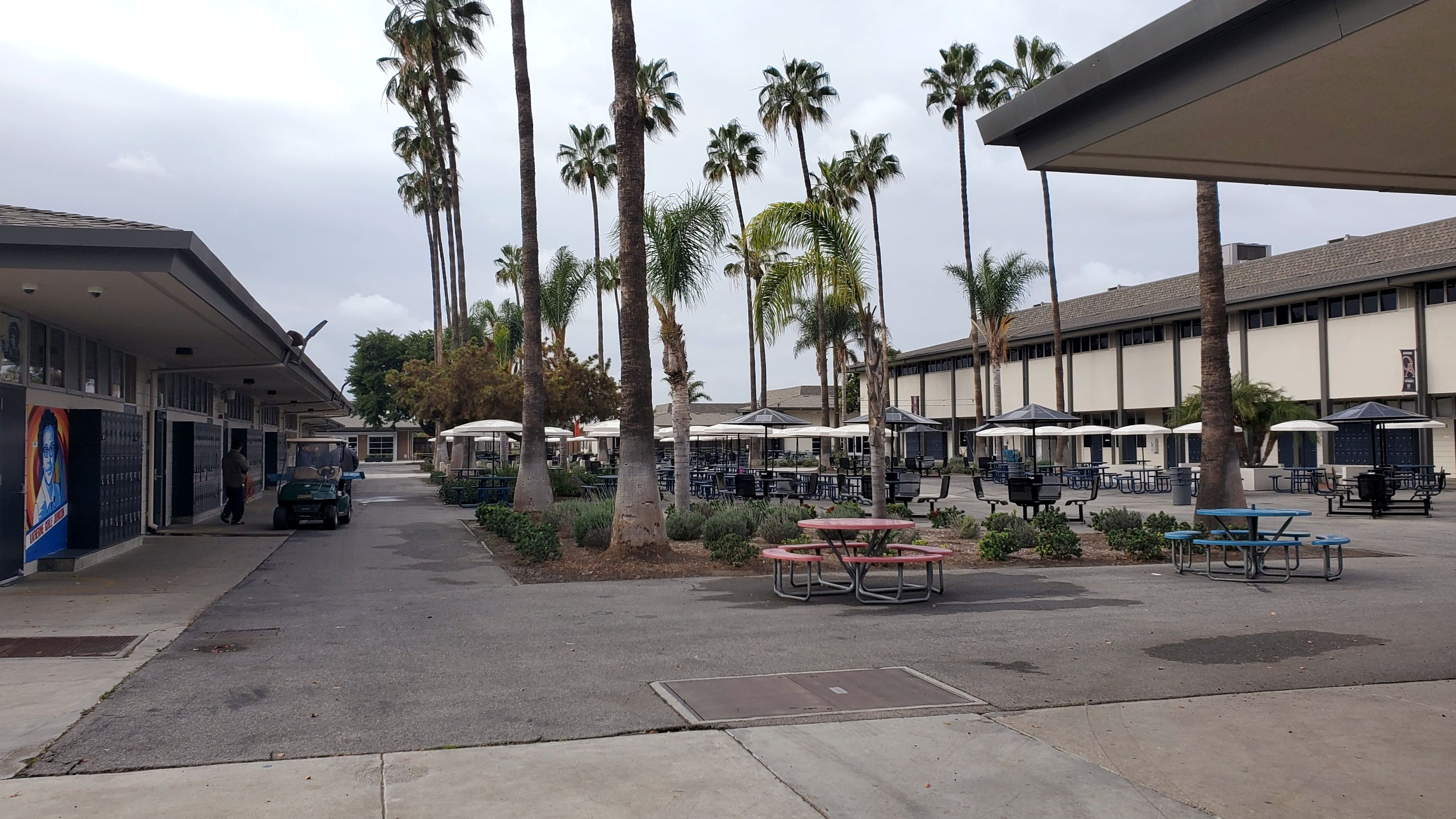
A view of Oxford's quad in 2022. The upgraded navy blue circular lunch tables, with built-in charging, are visible here.

== Admissions ==
Admission to Oxford Academy is offered to incoming seventh, eighth, and ninth grade students, and happens in two stages. During the fall, applicants must submit their final report cards from the prior two years, a proof of residency, as well as a letter of recommendation from a teacher. Applications are typically due in late October or early November. Applicants who pass this initial screening process are invited to take an entrance exam the following January on-site usually lasting about 3 to 4 hours. This exam consists of several multiple-choice math and reading comprehension questions, short answer math questions, and a written essay. Students are informed about final admission decisions in the following month.

For seventh-graders, about 200 spaces are reserved for students who reside within AUHSD attendance boundaries, which serves most of Anaheim and Cypress, but also portions of La Palma, Buena Park, and Stanton. From there, Oxford selects 25 students from each of the attendance areas defined by the school district's eight junior high schools. The school also designates an additional 70 spots for those who may live outside attendance boundaries. Admission into the eighth and ninth grades is extremely limited, given only when spaces become available due to current student withdrawals. Occasionally, students may not be admitted in the case that no such vacancies occur.

During the 2020-2021 admissions cycle, in-person testing was temporarily suspended due to COVID-19; an online exam and one-minute interview video was added as an admissions requirement. In the following year, in-person testing was resumed and the one minute video was removed as an admissions consideration.

The school's prestigious reputation has also given rise to classes offered by private tutoring organizations in the area, such as Perfect Score Academy and Pace Academy, to assist prospective students in preparing for the entrance examination.

== Demographics ==
In the 2024–25 school year, Oxford Academy's enrollment totaled 1315 students, 817 students coming from high school and 498 students coming from junior high. Of this, 643 students are male and 672 students are female

Oxford's student body consists primarily of Asian-Americans. According to the NCES, its racial makeup during the aforementioned school year was

- 960 (73.00%) Asian
- 230 (17.49%) Hispanic
- 65 (4.94%) White (non-Hispanic)
- 35 (2.66%) Two or more races
- 10 (0.76%) Black (non-Hispanic)
- 0 (0.00%) American Indian / Alaska Native

As reported by NCES, 442 students (33.61%) were eligible for either free or reduced-price lunch under the National School Lunch Act of 1946.

== Dress code ==
The school sells polo shirts embroidered with the OA logo, considered to be the standard school uniform, as well as pants at the start of the school year.

While on campus or at school-sponsored events, all students must wear a solid red, white, blue, or grey polo top paired with khaki or navy-blue pants, shorts, or skirts. Black tops were once allowed, but were prohibited prior to the 2010–11 school year. They may also wear a sweatshirt or sweater of an appropriate color, though only if it has an OA logo. To fulfill these criteria, students generally wear a school-provided top, which is a solid-color polo with the Oxford Academy "OA" logo embroidered on the chest, as well as school-provided khaki bottoms.

There are a few exceptions to these rules. Notably, students may wear (approved) class-specific shirts or college sweaters, with jeans being allowed on Fridays. Spirit wear is also allowed on that day but must not be black (2024 and earlier). Students are allowed to wear formal attire to school if required to for a class or club-related event. The school occasionally holds "free dress days", typically on the last day of the semester or on any other special day, where students are allowed to wear anything which fits within the wider AUHSD dress code.

Violation of dress code during normal school hours results in the student being required to change clothes in addition to being punished accordingly (typically through detention). Too many of such infractions may even cause the offender to lose the privilege of participating in free dress days.

== Academics ==
Oxford Academy rigorously prepares its students for a college environment, both socially and academically. The school uses a typical eight-period schedule on Mondays, except when holidays reduce the school week down to 4 days, as well as an alternating "block schedule", holding even periods on Tuesdays and Thursdays and odd periods on Wednesdays and Fridays, mirroring the longer but more spaced-out class structure found at most American universities. The school also provides a wide selection of advanced placement (AP) courses for potential future college credit, several of which are mandatory for graduation. Most other academic courses are offered as Honors classes; though they do not confer college credit, they are assigned the same credit weight as AP classes. While students have the choice between AP and Honors offerings for some courses, by graduation all students will have at least completed AP English Language and Composition, AP English Literature and Composition, AP United States History, and AP United States Government and Politics. Oxford offers classes which fulfill University of California (UC) "A-G Course" requirements, guaranteeing that students graduate having fulfilled the minimum course requirements for attending a school in the UC system. Students may also enroll in dual enrollment courses at nearby Cypress College, gaining high school and college credit for certain subject areas which may directly translate into California State University (CSU) or UC credit.

The school uses a Grade Point Average (GPA) system with an unweighted GPA range from 0.0 to 4.0 and a weighted GPA range from 0.0 to 5.0 to measure academic success with strict minimum GPA requirements for students. Students in 7th and 8th grade must maintain a minimum GPA of 2.5 or above, students in 9th and 10th grade must maintain a GPA of 2.7 or above, and students in 11th and 12th must maintain a GPA of 3.0 or above in order to avoid being placed on academic probation. Failure to improve one's academic performance to this standard results in expulsion from the school.

Aside from its standard classes, Oxford also offers Career Technical Education (CTE) pathways consisting of Biotechnology, Business, Computer Science, and Engineering in an effort to expose students to different fields of study they may pursue after high school. In 7th grade, students take an introductory pathway course lasting one quarter each. In high school, students select one of these four CTE pathways to take for 3 years. The Computer Science pathway is the only one to offer AP classes (AP Computer Science Principles and AP Computer Science A), and the Engineering and Biotechnology pathways are taught by instructors from North Orange County ROP. Students are also required to take at least 3 years of a foreign language and 1 year of visual and performing arts (VAPA) for graduation. Foreign language offerings have changed over the years, with French and Mandarin having been available for students in the past. As of 2026, the two languages offered are Spanish and Korean. To fulfill their mandatory VAPA requirement, students may choose between orchestra, band, choir, and art.

== Athletics ==
Oxford offers a variety of extracurricular sports for its students to participate in. High school students may join cross country, volleyball, girls flag football, baseball, softball, basketball, soccer, tennis, swimming, golf, or track and field, and typically compete against other schools in the 605 League within the CIF Southern Section. Oxford notably does not have its own football team. Junior high school students may partake in intramural athletics, which include the aforementioned sports except swimming, golf, and baseball. They also play against other middle schools in AUHSD.

As of 2026, the men's baseball team has achieved the most team success, with CIF-SS Divisional Championships won in 2009, 2010, and 2024.
