= James Gattuso =

American academic (1957–2020)

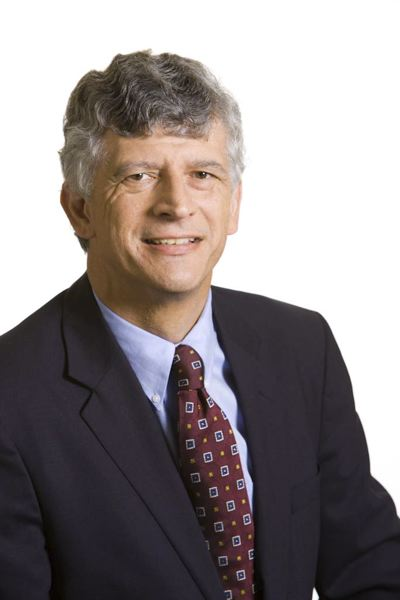
- Gattuso in March 2011
- Born: James Leslie Gattuso; 1 December 1957; Lynwood, California, U.S.
- Died: 23 July 2020 (aged 62); Kennebunkport, Maine, U.S.
- Education: USC; UCLA (J.D.)
- Occupations: Senior Research Fellow, Roe Institute for Economic Policy Studies
- Employer: The Heritage Foundation

James Leslie Gattuso (December 1, 1957 – July 23, 2020) was a senior research fellow for the Roe Institute for Economic Policy Studies at The Heritage Foundation, a conservative think tank based in Washington, D.C., where he specialized in regulatory issues and telecommunications policy. Gattuso authored articles for The Wall Street Journal, USA Today, The Washington Times, and other publications.

== Early life and education ==
Gattuso was born on December 1, 1957, in Lynwood, California. He attended the University of Southern California in Los Angeles, where he graduated in 1979. He attended UCLA School of Law, where he received his J.D. in 1983.

== Career ==
Gattuso was a policy analyst at The Heritage Foundation from 1985 to 1990, where he focused on telecommunications, transportation, and antitrust policy.

From 1990 to 1993, Gattuso served as deputy chief of the Office of Plans and Policy at the Federal Communications Commission. During part of his tenure, he was appointed associate director of the President's Council on Competitiveness, working for Vice President Dan Quayle. In 1993, Citizens for a Sound Economy named Gattuso vice president of policy development, a position he held until 1997. He then served as vice president of policy at the Competitive Enterprise Institute.

Gattuso rejoined The Heritage Foundation in 2002 as a senior research fellow. In 2009, he received the Glenn and Rita Ricardo Campbell Award, presented each year by The Heritage Foundation for "outstanding contribution to the analysis and promotion of the Free Society". He is also a regular contributor to the Heritage Foundation's blog and previously to Bloomberg's online service, Bloomberg Government.

Gattuso favored limiting regulations at the federal level. Specifically, Gattuso tended to favor decreased government involvement when it came to regulatory, transportation and telecommunication policy, arguing instead for private enterprise solutions. He also opposes net neutrality, calling it a "regulatory overreach".

In 2011, Gattuso was influential in stopping the SOPA/PIPA online copyright legislation, authoring a report for The Heritage Foundation criticizing the proposals.

Along with his colleague Diane Katz, he authored "Red Tape Rising", an annual review on trends in federal regulation, which became a widely cited barometer of regulatory activity.

In 2011, Gattuso was featured on The Tonight Show when Jay Leno showed a video of Gattuso on an earlier Fox News segment, and asked the question, "Would his hair look better as a beard?" digitally moving his hair around to his chin, leaving him bearded and bald.

== Death ==
On July 23, 2020, Gattuso died of cancer, in Kennebunkport, Maine, at age 62.
