= Norwalk High School (California) =

Coordinates: 33.90806°N 118.0902°W

Location
- 11356 Leffingwell Road; Norwalk, California; USA

Information
- Type: Public High School
- Established: 1956
- School district: Norwalk-La Mirada Unified School District
- Principal: David Olea
- Grades: 9-12
- Enrollment: 1,980 (2023-2024)
- Language: English
- Campus: Urban
- Colors: Purple, Gold and White
- Mascot: Lancers
- Newspaper: The Voice
- Website: Norwalk High School website

Norwalk High School is a high school in Norwalk, California. It is a member school of the Norwalk-La Mirada Unified School District. It was established in 1956. Norwalk High School is fully accredited by the Western Association of Schools and Colleges and is a California Distinguished School. It is certified to award a traditional American high school diploma. English is the main language of instruction. The current principal is David M. Olea.

== History ==
The school was established in 1956. In the 2006–07 school year, the school celebrated its 50th anniversary. As of 2014–15, the average class size was 29.3 students.

== Curriculum ==
Norwalk High School follows the University of California & California State University's 4-years college-prep curriculum. Norwalk High School also divides into specialized programs: PLTW Biomedical Engineering, PLTW Computer Science, PLTW Engineering, Advanced Placement, Medical Academy, LA Fame (visual and performing arts), Gifted and Talented Education, English as Second Language Support, Seal of Biliteracy and Special Education.

The school offers various advanced courses such as AP courses, Early College Program, AVID, and many more. It is an examination center for the SAT, ACT, AP exams and other college-requirement tests. In addition to American high school diploma, Norwalk High School is authorized to award the Seal of Biliteracy, a seal certified to students who have proficiency in English and other foreign languages. The school offers an English as Second Language program for students who need additional support with English.

== Extracurricular activities ==
Norwalk High School has many clubs and activities for students. The following list should not be considered exhaustive: Associated Student Body, Marching Band, Concert Band, Wind Ensemble, Jazz Band, Choir/Sing Club, Bible Club, The Voice Newspaper, Yearbook Club, French Club, California Scholarship Federation, Key Club, Academic Decathlon, Shared Decision Making Council, Art Club, AVID Club, Millennium Club, Culinary Club, Chess Club, Dance Club, Debate Club, Film Club, Interact Club, MECHA Club, Spanish Club, Theatrics Club, Women Empowerment Club, Green Team, Femineers Club, and First Aid Club. Students participate in these clubs, which occasionally includes a component of volunteer work.

Besides clubs, many students participate in athletics, which include Baseball, Basketball, Football, Golf, Soccer, Softball, Tennis, Volleyball, Wrestling, Cross Country, and Track and Field.

== Notable alumni ==
- Jim York (class of 1965) — pitcher for Kansas City Royals, Houston Astros, and New York Yankees
- Bob Kevoian (class of 1969) — radio host, The Bob & Tom Show
- Elijhaa Penny (class of 2011) — former fullback for the New York Giants
- Rashaad Penny (class of 2014) — running back for the Philadelphia Eagles
- Gene Taylor (class of 1970) — musician, acclaimed blues-rock and boogie-woogie pianist
