= Downey High School =

Senior high school in the Los Angeles suburb of Downey, California

Location
- 11040 Brookshire Ave. Downey, California 90241; United States; 33.9389°N 118.1287°W

Information
- School type: Public, High school
- Motto: Home of the Vikings
- Established: 1901
- School district: Downey Unified School District
- Superintendent: John Garcia
- Principal: Adrian Quintero
- Teaching staff: 165.86 (FTE)
- Grades: 9th - 12th
- Enrollment: 3,936 (2023-2024)
- Student to teacher ratio: 23.73
- Colors: Cardinal and Gold
- Athletics conference: San Gabriel Valley League
- Sports: Boys' and Girls': Basketball, Baseball, Cheerleading, Cross Country, Football, Golf, Lacrosse, Soccer, Softball, Swimming, Track & Field, Tennis, Volleyball, Water Polo, Wrestling
- Mascot: Viking
- Rivals: Warren High School
- Website: web.dusd.net/downey/

Downey High School is one of two senior high schools located in the Los Angeles suburb of Downey, California, and within the Downey Unified School District. It is located at 11040 Brookshire Ave. At the present time the school has an enrollment of about 4340 students, of a variety of racial and ethnic backgrounds and socio-economic levels.

Currently, Tom Houts is the principal. In addition, there are five other administrators, as well as seven full-time counselors. The instruction staff consists of 151 teachers and the operation functions with the assistance of a staff of 85 specialized employees (custodians, secretaries, nurses, security guards, etc.)

== History ==
Around the start of the 20th century, Downey was a small agricultural community. There were, however, enough boys and girls of high school age that a group of citizens got together and organized what was then called Los Nietos Valley Union High School. On August 16, 1901, Los Nietos Valley High School became the eleventh high school in the Los Angeles County School System.

In 1903, the first building at Second and Church Streets, where Walker Hall now stands, was formed. The original cornerstone of this building is now preserved in front of the Viking Tower. Before the building was ready for use, classes were held for 45 students in the auditorium of a grammar school. The faculty consisted of one principal, A.E. Farlington and one teacher, Miss Gertrude Smith. The first graduating class of 1904 had four students who received their diplomas. The course of study for the first few years was a college prerequisite curriculum, but in 1911, a commercial course was offered for students which enabled them to work immediately after graduation.

The name of the school was changed to Downey Union High School in 1919. The following year, the school got its first bus, since the only previous transportation had been supplied through Mrs. Van Matre, who used her car to bring students who lived within a mile of the school. In 1926–1927, the original building was condemned as a fire hazard and torn down. A gymnasium was built on the site. In turn, the gymnasium was demolished in 1957–1958, and Walker Hall constructed in its place. It was named in honor of William H Walker, a retired teacher and former superintendent. The first building for junior high school students was built in 1929–1930, which is the present “R” building. The senior and junior high schools were combined on a single campus in 1951–1952. Because agricultural lands were being developed as residential sub-divisions, more schools were needed. The first separate junior high school was South Junior High School (Sussman Middle School), dedicated on May 1, 1952, teaching about half the students in grades seven, eight, and nine. The remaining half of the students stayed in what was then called Central Junior High School. In 1953, these students moved away to become North Junior High School (Griffiths Middle School). In 1954, the third junior high school, East Junior High School was formed. In 1957, a second senior high school, Earl Warren Senior High School, and a fourth junior high school, West Junior High School opened their doors. A fifth junior high school, Woodruff Junior High School, opened in September, 1959. On July 1, 1961, the Downey Union High School District was merged with the four elementary districts to form the Downey Unified School District.

== Academics ==
Downey High School offers a wide variety of AP (Advanced Placement) courses: AP Chemistry, AP Biology, AP Psychology, AP Calculus, AP Spanish Language and Culture, AP European History, AP United States History, AP Government, AP Economics, AP Music Theory, AP Studio Art, AP Human Geography, AP English Literature and Composition, AP English Language and Composition, and AP Seminar.

== Demographics ==
In terms of race and ethnicity, Hispanic and Latino students comprised the majority (75.5%) of the student body. Caucasian students were the second largest group; they make up 12.7% of the student body. African American students and Asian students made up 5.5 and 5.4% of the student body respectively. The remaining 0.9% of the student body are composed of American Indian and multiracial students.

== Athletics ==
Downey High School is part of the San Gabriel Valley League, which also includes the Dominguez High School Dons, Gahr High School Gladiators, Lynwood High School Knights, Paramount High School Pirates, and Warren High School Bears. They have lost to Warren in their last 6 rivalry football game appearances. Warren leads the all-time series 37–29.

== Notable alumni ==
- Robert Ballard, oceanographer, discoverer of the ruins of Titanic
- The Carpenters, musical duo formed by siblings Karen Carpenter (1950–1983) and Richard Carpenter
- Ryan Conferido, member of the dance group Quest Crew
- Joslyn Davis, YouTuber on Clevver media
- Stanley Franks, football player with the BC Lions
- Brian Haner, musician, comedian
- James Hetfield, lead vocalist, rhythm guitarist and co-founder of the American heavy metal band Metallica
- Ryan Hollweg, hockey player with the New York Rangers.
- George Horton, baseball head coach at University of Oregon, two-time NCAA champion
- John Lee, professional football player
- Ron McGovney, the original bassist of Metallica
- George Pajon, songwriter, composer, music producer and guitarist for Black Eyed Peas, Fergie Duhamel
- Joe Rudi, Major League Baseball player
- Ken Shelley, winner US National pairs skating title in 1970, 1971, and 1972
- Jo Jo Starbuck, won US National pairs skating title in 1970, 1971, and 1972

== Notable faculty ==
- Chris Castile, child actor turned U.S. history teacher
