= East Middle School =

East Middle School may refer to:

- East Middle School (California)
- East Middle School (Farmington, Michigan)
- East Middle School (Oklahoma)
