= Gahr =

Gahr may refer to:

- Gahr High School, a high school in Cerritos, California, United States
- David Gahr (1922–2008), American photographer

== See also ==
- Jonas Gahr Støre (born 1960), Norwegian politician
