= Broderick Thompson =

American football player (1960–2002)

No. 70, 67, 76
- Positions: Tackle; Guard

Personal information
- Born: August 14, 1960; Birmingham, Alabama, U.S.
- Died: February 4, 2002 (aged 41); Las Vegas, Nevada, U.S.
- Listed height: 6 ft 5 in (1.96 m)
- Listed weight: 295 lb (134 kg)

Career information
- High school: Gahr (Cerritos, California)
- College: Kansas
- NFL draft: 1983: undrafted

Career history
- Dallas Cowboys (1983)*; San Antonio Gunslingers (1983)*; Chicago Blitz (1984)*; Los Angeles Express (1984)*; Los Angeles Rams (1984)*; Portland Breakers (USFL) (1984–1985); Memphis Showboats (USFL) (1985)*; Dallas Cowboys (1985); San Diego Chargers (1987–1992); Philadelphia Eagles (1993–1994); Denver Broncos (1995–1996)
- * Offseason or practice squad member only

Awards and highlights
- All-USFL (1985)

Career NFL statistics
- Games played: 152
- Games started: 135
- Fumble recoveries: 2
- Stats at Pro Football Reference

Broderick Lorenzo Thompson (August 14, 1960 – February 4, 2002) was an American professional football offensive lineman in the National Football League for the Dallas Cowboys, San Diego Chargers, Philadelphia Eagles, and the Denver Broncos. He also played for the Portland Breakers of the USFL. He played college football at the University of Kansas.

== Early life ==
Thompson attended Richard Gahr High School where he was a standout in basketball and played but didn't start football, before moving on to Cerritos Junior College where he became a starter as a defensive tackle.

He would later transfer to the University of Kansas on a football scholarship. As a junior, he was one of the starting defensive tackles. He missed most of his last year with a stress fracture in his ankle.

== Professional career ==
=== Dallas Cowboys (first stint) ===
Thompson was not selected in the 1983 NFL draft, because an ankle injury forced him to miss much of his senior season. He was signed as an undrafted free agent by the Dallas Cowboys, who converted him to the offensive line, playing both on offense and defense during training camp. He was waived on August 2.

=== San Antonio Gunslingers (USFL) ===
On November 12, 1983, he signed with the San Antonio Gunslingers, but was traded to the Chicago Blitz in exchange for the rights to quarterback Bob Gagliano on January 3, 1984. He was cut on January 31.

=== Los Angeles Express (USFL) ===
The Los Angeles Express signed him on February 10, 1984, but was released three days later.

=== Los Angeles Rams ===
On May 4, 1984, he was signed as a free agent by the Los Angeles Rams. He was waived on August 21.

=== Portland Breakers (USFL) ===
Thompson signed with the New Orleans Breakers of the United States Football League on January 23, 1985. The team ended up moving to Portland, where he played in all 18 games and earned All-All-USFL honors at right guard. In July the team was bankrupt and couldn't pay its payroll, so their players became free agents.

He was claimed off waivers by the Memphis Showboats on August first and released the next day.

=== Dallas Cowboys (second stint) ===
On August 3, 1985, Thompson signed as a free agent with the Dallas Cowboys and played 11 games as a backup. He was cut six games into the 1986 season.

=== San Diego Chargers ===
In 1987, he signed as a free agent with the San Diego Chargers. He played in 9 games (4 starts) alternating between right tackle and right guard. The next year, he was a regular starter at right guard and then to right tackle, eventually accumulating a streak of 62 straight starts, becoming a team captain and one of the Chargers top offensive linemen.

In 1992, he started 12 games at right guard before suffering a shoulder injury against the Kansas City Chiefs. The next year, he was traded to the Philadelphia Eagles in exchange for a fifth round selection.

=== Philadelphia Eagles ===
Although he had never played the position before, the Philadelphia Eagles moved him to left tackle and started 10 games until suffering a calf strain that put him out of the season. The next year, he started 14 games at right tackle, before being replaced with Tom McHale.

=== Denver Broncos ===
In 1995, he signed as a free agent with the Denver Broncos, reuniting with his previous offensive line coach Alex Gibbs. He was the starter at right tackle during his two seasons with the team.

== Personal life ==
Thompson died on February 4, 2002, from injuries sustained in a motorcycle accident outside of Las Vegas, Nevada. His sister Necie Thompson was a basketball All-American at UCLA.
