= Promenade at Downey =

Retail power center in California

Coordinates: 33.9239204°N 118.1306539°W

The Promenade at Downey is a 77-acre (31 ha), 656,000-square-foot (60,900 m^{2}) retail power center in Downey, California, built on the 1,500,000-square-foot (140,000 m^{2}) mixed-use development on the site of the former Downey Studios, which before that was the site of a Boeing/NASA industrial complex, originally built in 1948 by North American Aviation.

The original name that was to be given to the center was "Tierra Luna Marketplace".

Anchors include Walmart, Cinemark multicinema, 24 Hour Fitness, Burlington, Ulta Beauty, Five Below, Floor & Decor, TJ Maxx, and HomeGoods. There are signed walks on the property with information about the site's history in relation to film and to aerospace.

The Promenade is immediately adjacent to Downey Landing, another power center built on the northernmost 34 acres of the aerospace site, anchored by Best Buy, DSW Shoe Warehouse, Harbor Freight Tools, LA Fitness, Marshalls, Michael's, Old Navy, Party City (now closing), PetSmart, Ross, Sephora, Sprouts Farmers Market, and Staples. Also adjacent are Kaiser Permanente Downey hospital (built on 30 acres of the site) and the Columbia Memorial Space Center.

== History Walk ==
The History Walk at the Promenade is a path along which are located "decorative medallion markers" and "educational stations" highlighting Downey's significant contributions to space exploration and movie making.

The story of the space missions is told through a processional walk in the entertainment court that features hardscaped decorative medallion markers and educational stations which pay tribute to individual Apollo program and Space Shuttle space missions. In addition there are "reading stations" which describe the major films that were shot on site when the lot was the site of Downey Studios.
