= Riki R. Nelson =

American oil painter

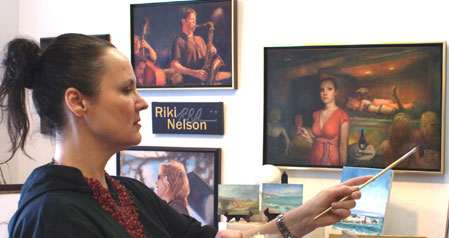
- Born: Downey, California, U.S.
- Education: Columbia University
- Known for: Oil painting

Riki R. Nelson is an American oil painter whose work often depicts portraits of jazz musicians, bar interiors, and urban street scenes. Her style incorporates elements of realism and surrealism. She works primarily in traditional oil-based media.

Her paintings have included portrayals of jazz performers and other musicians, and her work has been displayed in exhibitions and art galleries in California. Some of her pieces depict bar scenes with symbolic or archetypal imagery, as well as plein air landscapes of the California coastline.

== Early life and background ==
Nelson was born in Downey, California and grew up in both Downey and the San Francisco Bay Area. She is the daughter of Pearl and Ray Nelson and has a younger brother, Eric R. Nelson. Nelson began painting and drawing in childhood and was influenced by her mother's interest in the arts and the family's fine art and antique business.

== Career ==
During the 1980s and early 1990s, Nelson worked as an art consultant and sales manager in several fine art galleries, including Dyansen Gallery in Carmel, Chabot Gallery in Campbell, and Martin Lawrence Gallery in San Jose. Since 2005, her work has been exhibited at the Peabody Fine Art Gallery in Menlo Park and Los Gatos.

Nelson has participated in charitable art events supporting organizations such as the Los Gatos Art Association, the American Pen Women, and Pacific Autism. She has also delivered talks to art groups about presenting work to galleries and the public.
