= Warren High School (Downey, California) =

Coordinates: 33.936023°N 118.140192°W

Location
- 8141 De Palma Street; Downey, California 90241; United States

Information
- School type: Public, Secondary
- Established: 1956
- School district: Downey Unified School District
- Teaching staff: 144.46 (FTE)
- Grades: 9th - 12th
- Enrollment: 3,471 (2023-2024)
- Student to teacher ratio: 24.03
- Colors: Blue and Gold
- Athletics conference: San Gabriel Valley League
- Mascot: Bear
- Rival: Downey High School
- Website: https://web.dusd.net/warren/

Earl Warren High School is a public secondary school located in Downey, California (United States). Warren High School enrolls students in grades 9-12 and is a part of the Downey Unified School District.

== History ==
In 1956, Del Ward was the first principal of Warren High School and Cari White is the current principal.

Earl Warren Senior High School was originally instituted by the Downey Union High School District, which operated Downey Union High School where grades 7-12 were taught. When that district was built and began to operate separate junior high schools teaching grades 7-9, Downey's only high school was redesignated as Downey Senior High School and comprised grades 10-12. In 1956, eventually, Downey was incorporated as the City of Downey and a few years later, the Downey Unified School District was formed from several elementary school districts in Downey and the Downey Union High School District, which continued the junior high school and senior high school model until the early 1970s. At that time, the junior high schools in Downey became "middle schools" teaching grades 6-8 and the senior high schools became 4-year high schools comprising grades 9-12.

After its inception, class sizes grew gradually larger as a reflection of the Post-War Baby Boom. The class of 1970, with 715 students graduating was the largest to date and, by then, extra classrooms were needed. A new library was built, thus freeing up former library space for classrooms. A new physics laboratory and a new electronics laboratory were constructed alongside existing classrooms. The band room was remodeled, made windowless and soundproof, and outfitted with an air conditioning system. In the late 1960s, two prefabricated, freestanding modular classrooms were added next to the library to help accommodate the growing student body. At the same time, a swimming pool was finally constructed for aquatic sports.

In the mid-1960s, the student body raised funds to save an old olive tree that was going to be destroyed to make room for new construction somewhere in Downey; the tree was transplanted to the Warren campus and became a symbol of school spirit.

Originally, the campus had a central hot-water heating system, which was impractical because of the many disjunct buildings, mostly with four classrooms apiece, served by covered, outdoor hallways. The heating pipes had corroded in the ground and at various points resulted in pools of boiling mud where the pipes had ruptured. Many classrooms were without heat. In 1971, new forced air heating systems were retrofitted into the original classrooms served by the defunct hot-water heating systems.

In 2015, Warren High was awarded the California Gold Ribbon Award, based on their adoption and the integration of the California State University's Expository Reading and Writing Course (ERWC) curriculum.

The boys' and girls' locker rooms, along with the aquatic center, went through a large-scale renovation in 2017. The grand ceremony was conducted on 23 September 2017.

== Name ==
Earl Warren had been one of the most popular governors of California and was subsequently appointed as Chief Justice of the United States. The Warren Supreme Court's notable rulings included Brown v. Board of Education, which abolished the long-standing "separate but equal" doctrine that allowed segregated schools in the United States.

Warren appeared at the dedication of the school in 1955. The school colors of blue and gold were adopted because they were the official colors of the State of California. The California state animal, the bear, was designated as the school mascot, and the sports teams at Earl Warren High were known as "the Bears". The school newspaper was called "The Justice," and the girls' drill team was known as the "Honeybears" (Warren's daughter Nina Warren was nicknamed "Honeybear"). The class rings were designed to show, among other things, the scales of justice on one side and a gavel on the other, referring to Warren's tenure as Chief Justice of the United States.

== Demographics ==
Demographics for the 2018-2019 school year: 88.9% Latino or Hispanic, 2.7% African American, 2.9% Asian American, 4.8% European American, 0.3% American Indian, 0.2% Mixed, and 0.2% Pacific Islander.

== Notable alumni ==
- Rick Burleson, former Major League Baseball player
- Eric Hipple, Detroit Lions quarterback 1981-1986
- Nico Iamaleava, UCLA Bruins quarterback
- Kerry King, co-founder and guitarist for Slayer
- Bobby LaFromboise, Major League Baseball player
- Lena Park, Korean-American R&B singer
- Paul Ruffner, former BYU and pro basketball player
- Wayne Stewart, former AFL and NFL tight end
- Jeff Tedford, head football coach at Fresno State, previously at University of California, Berkeley
- Alan Trejo, Major League Baseball infielder
