= Downey Studios =

American production studio

Coordinates: 33°55′19.22″N 118°8′0.74″W

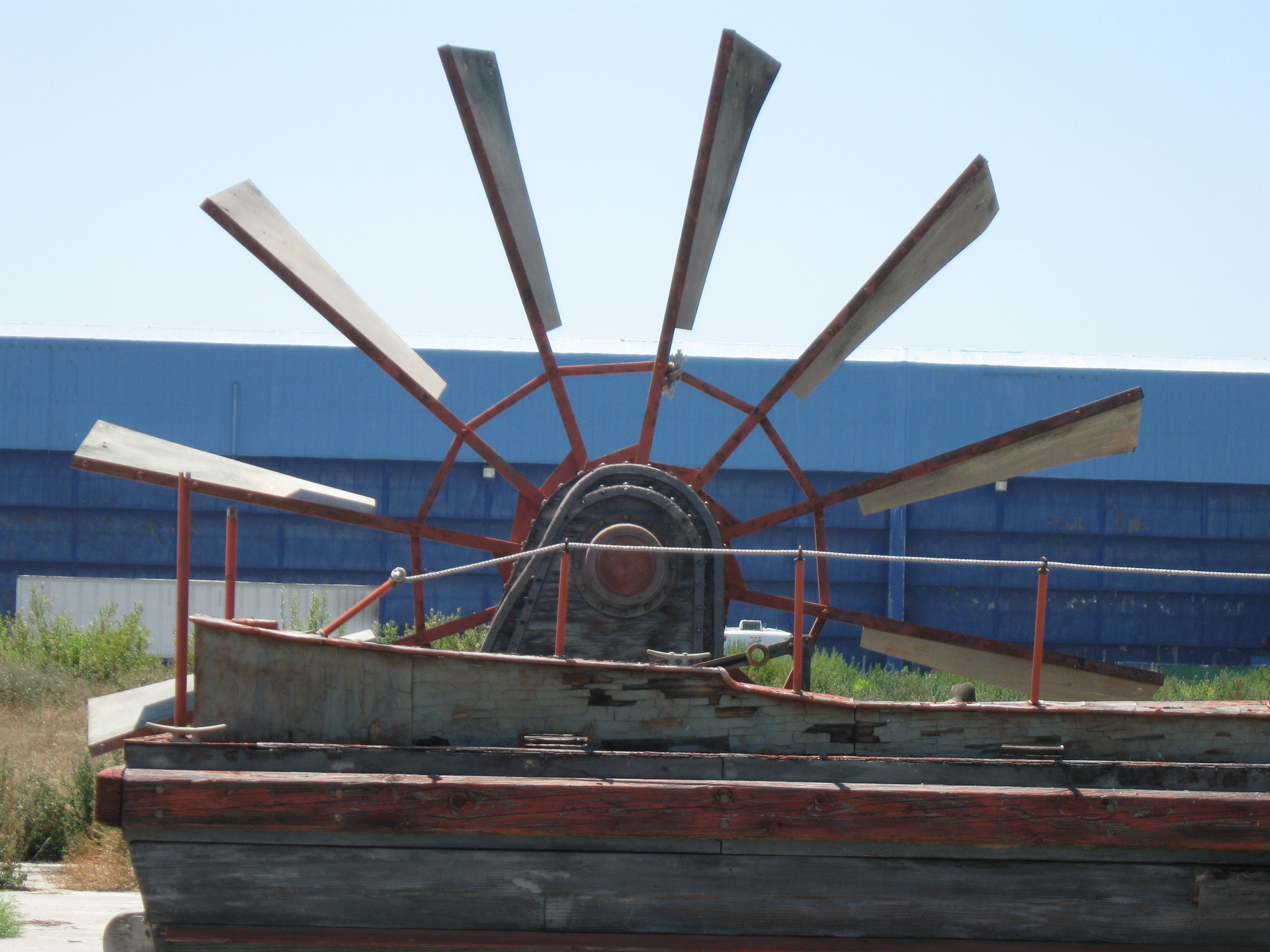
Simulated paddle wheel and part of a river boat at Downey Studios

The Downey Studios was a production studio in Downey, California. The studio featured 320,000 square metres (79 acres) of indoor and outdoor production space including a 4,600-square-metre (50,000 sq ft) building and a 23,000 square metres (250,000 sq ft) building which was home of the largest indoor water tank in North America. A suburban residential street backlot built especially for Christmas with the Kranks, with 5 complete homes and 11 facades, was also available at the studio.

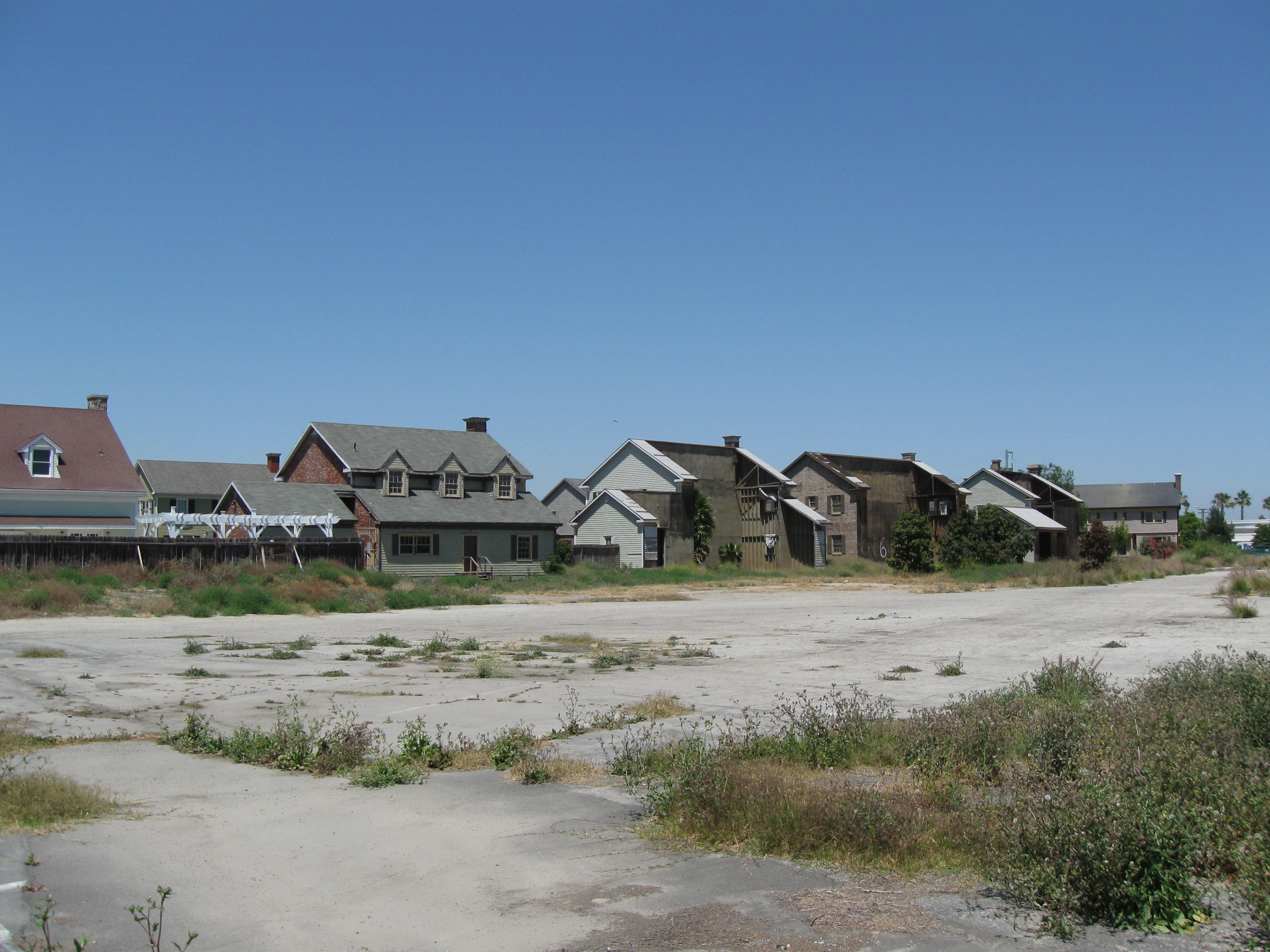
Backlot in May 2012

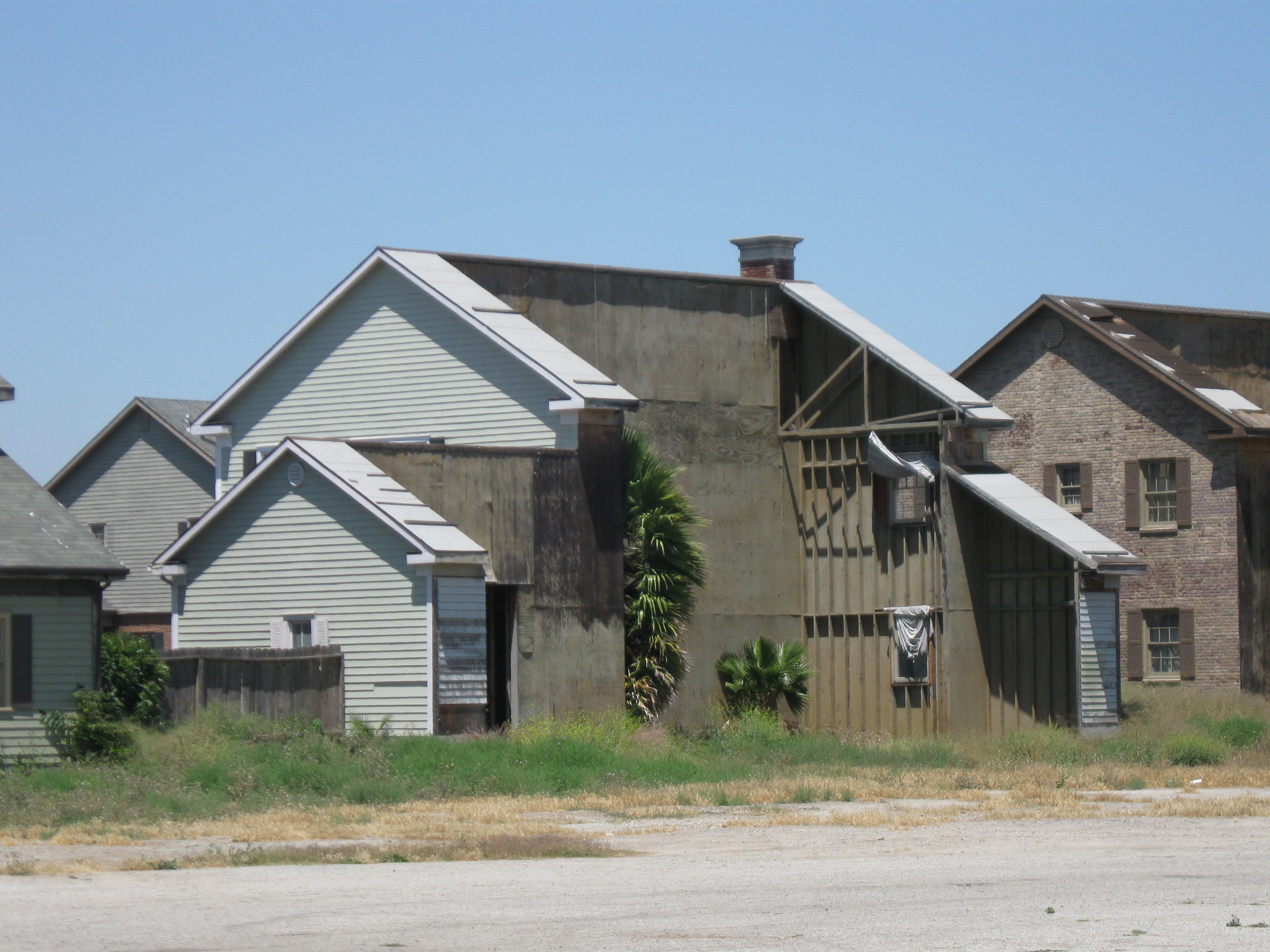
Rear of facade

The studios were created out of the former Rockwell International plant where the Space Shuttle orbiters as well as some vehicles for the Apollo space program were assembled. The studios occupied only a portion of the former plant with the Downey Landing shopping complex, a Kaiser Permanente hospital, a park, and Columbia Memorial Space Center museum taking up the remainder of the space.

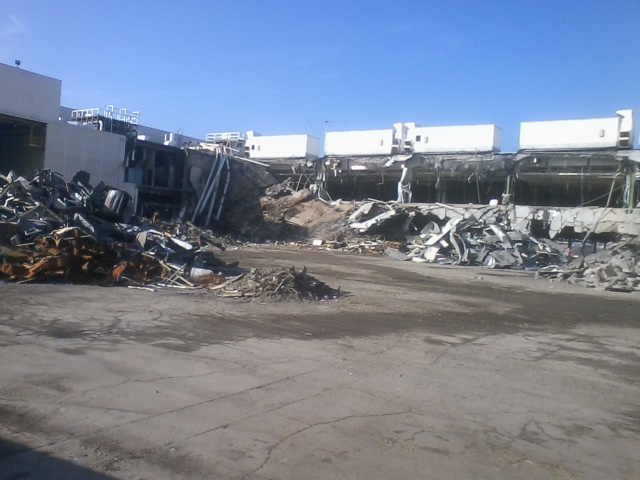
Studio buildings being demolished in November 2012

In October 2012 demolition of Downey Studios had begun. The Promenade at Downey retail power center is located on the site today.

== TV and film credits ==
- Iron Man 2 (2010)
- Deep in the Valley (2009)
- Couples Retreat (2009)
- G.I. Joe: The Rise of Cobra (2009)
- Indiana Jones and the Kingdom of the Crystal Skull (2008)
- Iron Man (2008)
- Pineapple Express (2008)
- Cloverfield (2008)
- Top Gear (2008)
- The No Sit List (2008)
- Out of Jimmy's Head (2007–2008)
- Zodiac (2007)
- Charlie Wilson's War (2007)
- Smash Lab (2007)
- Yo Gabba Gabba!, Season 1, 2007, Season 3, 2009
- The Santa Clause 3: The Escape Clause (2006)
- The Prestige (2006)
- Déjà Vu (2006)
- Smokin' Aces (2006)
- Free Ride (2006)
- The Slaughterhouse Massacre (2005)
- The Island (2005)
- Fun with Dick and Jane (2005)
- Van Helsing (2004)
- Lemony Snicket's A Series of Unfortunate Events (2004)
- Christmas with the Kranks (2004)
- In Enemy Hands (2004)
- The Italian Job (2003)
- Terminator 3: Rise of the Machines (2003)
- Daredevil (2003)
- Clockstoppers (2002)
- Catch Me If You Can (2002)
- Spider-Man (2002)
- Space Cowboys (2000)
- Life (1999)
- Can't Hardly Wait (1998)

=== Music Videos ===
- "Alejandro" - Lady Gaga (2010)
- "White & Nerdy" - "Weird Al" Yankovic (2010)
- “Otis” - Kanye West (2011)
- "Famous Last Words" - My Chemical Romance (2006)
- "Welcome To The Black Parade" - My Chemical Romance (2006)
- " Neighborhoods" - Blink - 182 (2011)
