= Bruce Walker (American football) =

American football player (1972–2014)

No. 91
- Position: Defensive tackle

Personal information
- Born: July 18, 1972; Compton, California, U.S.
- Died: November 6, 2014 (aged 42)
- Listed height: 6 ft 4 in (1.93 m)
- Listed weight: 310 lb (141 kg)

Career information
- High school: Dominguez (Compton, California)
- College: UCLA
- NFL draft: 1994: 2nd round, 37th overall pick

Career history
- Philadelphia Eagles (1994)*; New England Patriots (1994–1995); Frankfurt Galaxy (1997-1998); San Diego Chargers(1998–1999)*; Los Angeles Avengers (2000)
- * Offseason or practice squad member only

Career NFL statistics
- Tackles: 18
- Stats at Pro Football Reference

Bruce Romell Walker (July 18, 1972 – November 6, 2014) was an American professional football player who was a defensive tackle who played one season in the National Football League (NFL) for the New England Patriots. He was selected by the Philadelphia Eagles in the second round of the 1994 NFL draft after playing college football for the UCLA Bruins. He was released by the Eagles prior to the start of the 1994 season, and was a member of the Patriots in 1994 and 1995. He played for the Frankfurt Galaxy of NFL Europe in 1997.

== Early life ==
Walker was an All American running back and linebacker at Dominguez high school where he earned honors of parade All American, All USA Today and Gatorade circle of champions Player of the year for California and the Pacific region. His senior year, he rushed for over 1,500 yards, 15 touchdowns and recorded over 150 tackles and 15 sacks on defense. He was also considered the number one high school recruit in the nation in 1990. At 6'4" and 240 pounds, he was also the second leg on the school 4x100 relay team and ran a personal best of 21.9 in the 200 meters.

== College career ==
Bruce started as a true freshman for UCLA as a defensive lineman after showing up to campus a little over weight. He played three years where he earned all pac-10 honors and defensive freshman of the year. standout games were Arizona state where he recorded 15 solo tackles and two sacks from the nose guard position earning pac-10 player of the week and followed up again against Oregon state with a repeated performance 12 solo tackles earning player of the week again. Bruce also held the bench press record of 507 lbs.

== Professional career ==
=== Philadelphia Eagles ===
Walker was selected by the Philadelphia Eagles in the second round (37th overall) of the 1994 NFL draft. He was released on August 28, 1994.

=== New England Patriots ===
Bruce was picked up by the New England Patriots where he played two seasons and started 5 games.

In the off-season after his final year with the Patriots, Walker incurred a stab wound in his chest, which he explained as a result of missing a catch when he and a friend were throwing a steak knife at each other in a grocery store parking lot.

=== Frankfurt Galaxy ===
Walker was selected by the Frankfurt Galaxy in the sixteenth round (95th overall) of the 1997 World League Draft. Bruce played two seasons with the Galaxy leading them to the world bowl in 1998.

The San Diego Chargers picked Bruce up in 1998 and 1999 where he was plagued with injuries which prevented him from making the team.
