= Jeron Johnson =

American football player and coach (born 1988)

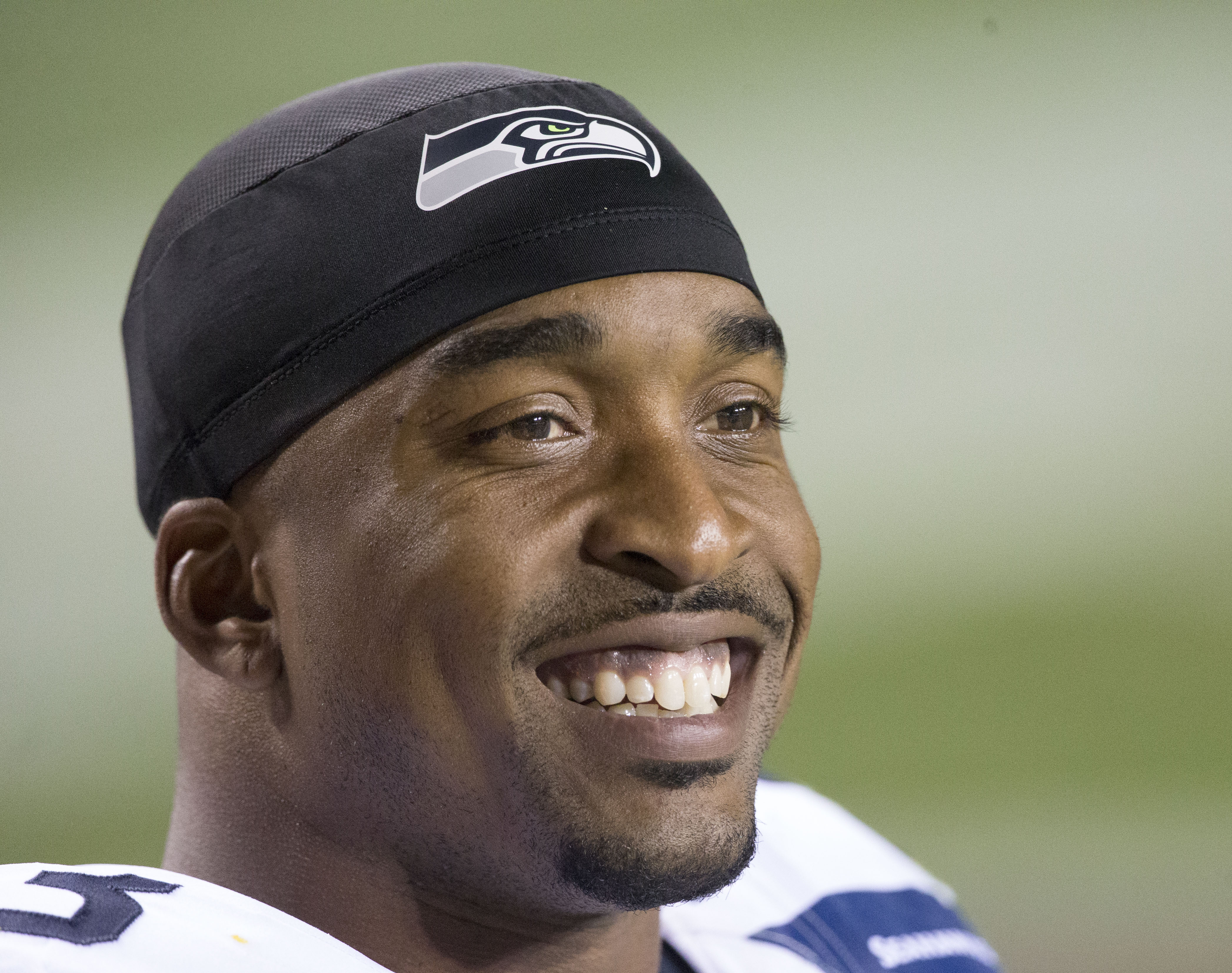
- Johnson with the Seattle Seahawks in 2014

No. 32, 23, 20
- Position: Safety

Personal information
- Born: June 12, 1988 (age 38); Compton, California, U.S.
- Listed height: 5 ft 10 in (1.78 m)
- Listed weight: 212 lb (96 kg)

Career information
- High school: Dominguez (Compton)
- College: Boise State
- NFL draft: 2011: undrafted

Career history

Playing
- Seattle Seahawks (2011–2014); Washington Redskins (2015); Kansas City Chiefs (2016)*; Seattle Seahawks (2016); Jacksonville Jaguars (2017)*; Dallas Cowboys (2018)*
- * Offseason or practice squad member only

Coaching
- Eastside Catholic HS (2018–2019) Defensive backs coach; Boise State (2021) Cornerbacks coach

Awards and highlights
- Super Bowl champion (XLVIII)

Career NFL statistics
- Total tackles: 75
- Sacks: 2.0
- Forced fumbles: 1
- Fumble recoveries: 1
- Pass deflections: 1
- Stats at Pro Football Reference

Jeron Johnson (born June 12, 1988) is an American former professional football player who was a safety in the National Football League (NFL). He played college football for the Boise State Broncos and was signed by the Seattle Seahawks as an undrafted free agent in 2011.

== Professional career ==
=== Seattle Seahawks ===
Johnson was signed by the Seattle Seahawks as an undrafted free agent following the end of the 2011 NFL lockout. He made the 53-man active roster as a reserve safety behind Kam Chancellor.

The Seahawks placed him on injured reserve on December 11, 2013, causing him to miss the last three games of the regular season and the team's playoff run and win in Super Bowl XLVIII.

On March 7, 2014, Johnson re-signed with the Seahawks on a one-year contract.

=== Washington Redskins ===
On March 16, 2015, Johnson signed a two-year, $4 million contract with the Washington Redskins. By the end of training camp, he was beat out of the starting strong safety position by Duke Ihenacho. In the Week 6 game against the New York Jets, he blocked a punt in the endzone, which was recovered by wide receiver Rashad Ross for a touchdown.

The Redskins released Johnson on March 7, 2016.

=== Kansas City Chiefs ===
On August 5, 2016, Johnson was signed by the Kansas City Chiefs. On September 2, 2016, Johnson was released by the Chiefs.

=== Second stint with the Seattle Seahawks ===
On December 6, 2016, Johnson re-signed with the Seahawks after Earl Thomas was placed on injured reserve.

=== Jacksonville Jaguars ===
On August 6, 2017, Johnson signed with the Jacksonville Jaguars. He was placed on injured reserve on September 1, 2017. He was released by the team on September 8, 2017.

=== Dallas Cowboys ===
On August 21, 2018, Johnson signed with the Dallas Cowboys. He was released on September 1, 2018.

=== Career statistics ===
Year	Team	GP	GS	COMB	TOTAL	AST	SACK	FF	FR	FR YDS	INT	IR YDS	AVG	LNG	TD	PD
2011	SEA	8	0	6	4	2	0.0	0	0	0	0	0	0	0	0	0
2012	SEA	16	0	12	7	5	2.0	1	0	0	0	0	0	0	0	0
2013	SEA	7	0	6	4	2	0.0	0	0	0	0	0	0	0	0	0
2014	SEA	15	1	19	12	7	0.0	0	1	0	0	0	0	0	0	1
2015	WAS	14	1	27	17	10	0.0	0	0	0	0	0	0	0	0	0
2016	SEA	4	0	5	2	3	0.0	0	0	0	0	0	0	0	0	0
Total		64	2	70	44	26	2.0	1	1	0	0	0	0	0	0	1
