= Downey, California =

- City
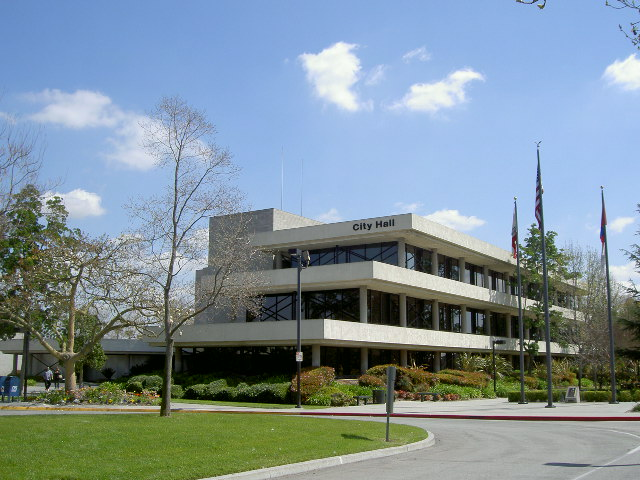
- The Downey City Hall in 2006

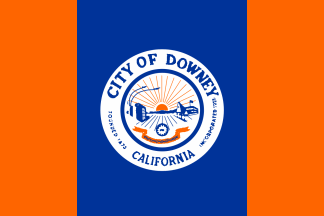
- Flag Seal
- Interactive map of Downey, California
- Location in the United States Downey, California (the Los Angeles metropolitan area) Downey, California (California)
- Coordinates: 33°56′17″N 118°07′51″W
- Country: United States
- State: California
- County: Los Angeles
- Founded: October 23, 1873
- Incorporated: December 17, 1956
- Named for: Gov. John G. Downey

Government
  - Type: Council–manager
  - Mayor: Claudia Frometa
  - Mayor Pro Tem: Horacio Ortiz
  - City council: Dorothy Pemberton; Hector Sosa; Mario Trujillo
  - City manager: Roger Bradley

Area
  - Total: 12.57 sq mi (32.55 km^{2})
  - Land: 12.41 sq mi (32.14 km^{2})
  - Water: 0.16 sq mi (0.42 km^{2}) 1.27%
- Elevation: 118 ft (36 m)

Population (2020)
  - Total: 114,355
  - Rank: 10th in Los Angeles County; 57th in California
  - Density: 9,215.8/sq mi (3,558.25/km^{2})
- Time zone: UTC−8 (PST)
  - Summer (DST): UTC−7 (PDT)
- ZIP Codes: 90239–90242
- Area code: 562
- FIPS code: 06-19766
- GNIS feature IDs: 1652698, 2410352
- Website: www.downeyca.org

Downey is a city in southeastern Los Angeles County, California, United States, 13 mi (21 km) southeast of Downtown Los Angeles. It is considered part of the Gateway Cities. The city is the birthplace of the Apollo space program and Taco Bell. It is also the home of the oldest operating McDonald's restaurant in the world. As of the 2020 census, the city had a total population of 114,355.

== History ==
=== 18th century to World War II ===
Mission San Gabriel Arcángel was initially founded on September 8, 1771, near settlements of the Tongva people. It was located in the Whittier Narrows on a bluff overlooking the Rio Hondo, near the modern intersection of San Gabriel Blvd and Lincoln Avenue. After five years, flooding forced the relocation of the mission to its present site in San Gabriel.

In 1784, Governor Pedro Fages granted to former soldier Manuel Nieto (1734–1804) the largest of the land concessions made in what was then Alta California, a province of New Spain. Its 300,000 acres (120,000 hectares) stretched from the Santa Ana River on the east to the Old San Gabriel River (now the Rio Hondo and Los Angeles River) on the west, and from the mission highway (approximately Whittier Boulevard) on the north to the ocean on the south. Its acreage was slightly reduced later at the insistence of Mission San Gabriel on whose lands it infringed. The Spanish concessions, of which 25 were made in California, were unlike the later Mexican land grants in that title was not transferred but were similar to grazing permits with the title remaining with the Spanish crown.

The Rancho Los Nietos passed to Manuel Nieto's four children upon his death and remained intact until 1833 when his heirs petitioned Mexican Governor José Figueroa to partition the property. The northwestern portion of the original rancho, comprising the Downey-Norwalk area, was granted as Rancho Santa Gertrudes to Josefa Cota, the widow of Manuel Nieto's son, Antonio Nieto. At approximately 21,000 acres (8,500 hectares), Santa Gertrudes was itself a sizable rancho and contained the old Nietos homestead, which was a center of social life east of the pueblo of Los Angeles.

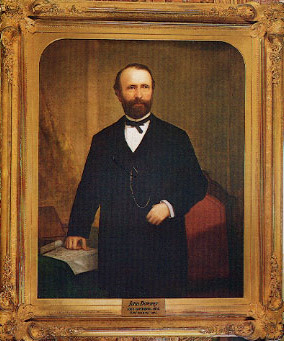
Governor John G. Downey by William F. Cogswell

Dairy was a major industry in Downey. The Central Milk Agency marketed the milk for "seven hundred dairymen whose dairy herds range from thirty to two thousand head" with the value of the products marketed in excess of $1,000,000 per month.

Some of Downey's settlers came from Ireland. Downey was founded by and named for the former and youngest ever governor of California, John Gately Downey, who was born in Ireland. Although he was an Irish Democrat, he supported the Republican Lincoln in his efforts to keep the Union intact during the American Civil War. He pioneered the modern subdivision with land he acquired between the Rio Hondo and the San Gabriel River, in about 1865. Downey was convinced that oranges would flourish in Southern California, importing several varieties, which would result in oranges becoming one of the state's biggest cash crops.

=== Gallatin ===
Two small settlements were established along the Rio Hondo River - College Settlement and Gallatin, near where the modern Paramount Boulevard and Florence Avenue cross. In the late 1860s, the Gallatin residents built a small school known as the "Little Red Gallatin School House". By 1871, it was not large enough and a two-story school was built. Gallatin School moved in 1893 to its present site. Later, Alameda School and Downey School were built. By 1883, College Settlement, Gallatin and Downey joined and with the help of Governor Downey convinced the Southern Pacific Railroad to route through and stop in Downey. The new center of activity migrated to the depot area and this became the center of a new larger Downey, uniting the three previous settlements.

=== After World War II ===
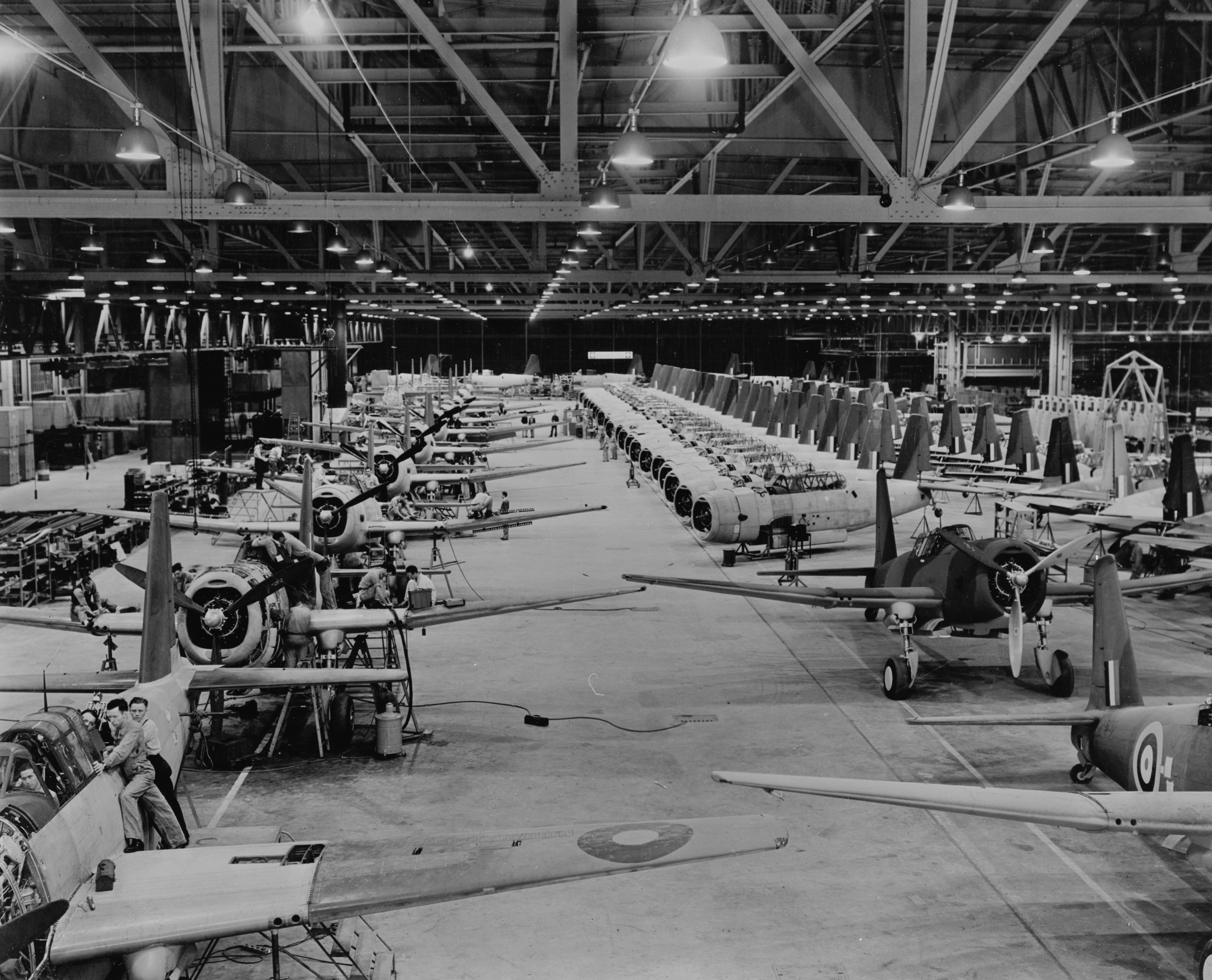
Workers in Downey building Vultee Vengeance bombers for the Royal Air Force in 1943

Farmers in the area grew grain, corn, castor beans, and fruit, and by 1935 Downey was characterized as an "orange-grove town". Downey was incorporated in 1956 and instituted a charter form of government in 1964. Suburban homes and factories replaced the farms after World War II.

==== Aerospace ====
Vultee Aircraft was Downey's largest employer during World War II producing 15% of all of America's military aircraft by 1941. The company was a pioneer in the use of women in manufacturing positions and was the first aircraft company to build airplanes on a powered assembly line. After World War 2, the plant was mostly idle from 1945 until 1948, when North American Aviation (later North American Rockwell, then Rockwell International which was then bought by the Boeing company) occupied the facility. In 1961, the facilities were transferred from the US Air Force ownership to NASA and became the birthplace of the systems for the Apollo Space Program as well as the Space Shuttle. For over 70 years, Downey's Rockwell NASA plant produced and tested many of the 20th century's greatest aviation, missile, and space endeavors.

The seventy-year history of airplane and space vehicle manufacturing in Downey came to an end when the Rockwell plant closed in 1999. The plant was demolished and replaced by the Columbia Memorial Space Center, Downey Landing shopping center, Promenade at Downey shopping center (the former movie studio site of Downey Studios), a Kaiser Permanente hospital, and a city recreation fields park.

==== Other landmarks ====
Near the center of the city lies what was in the 1960s one of the busiest intersections in California, the intersection of Lakewood Boulevard (State Route 19) and Firestone Boulevard (former State Route 42). Route 19 was a major thoroughfare between Pasadena and the port at Long Beach and Route 42 was along part of the old Spanish El Camino Real trail that connected the Pueblo de Los Angeles to San Diego.

In the 1960s, the town's Downey Records achieved some notoriety with recordings such as The Chantays' surfing instrumental "Pipeline"; nearly two decades later, Downey's local music scene led to the founding of The Blasters and Dark Angel.

Rancho Los Amigos National Rehabilitation Center, the main public rehabilitation hospital for Los Angeles County, is located in Downey. Rancho Los Amigos is renowned worldwide for its innovative contributions to the care of spinal cord injuries and post-polio syndrome.

Downey was featured in the 2008 American action-comedy film Pineapple Express. Many of the buildings along Florence Avenue are seen in a driving sequence early in the film.

Downey is home to the world's oldest existing McDonald's Restaurant, the so-called Speedee McDonald's Store, which opened in 1953 at the southwest corner of Florence Avenue and Lakewood Boulevard. Damaged in the 1994 Northridge Earthquake, the store reopened in 1996 along with a museum and gift shop.

== Geography ==
According to the United States Census Bureau the city has a total area of 12.6 square miles (33 km^{2}), of which 12.4 square miles (32 km^{2}) is land and 0.2 square miles (0.52 km^{2}) is water.

The cities of South Gate and Bell Gardens are adjacent to the west and northwest, Pico Rivera lies to the northeast, Santa Fe Springs and Norwalk to the east, and Paramount and Bellflower are to the south.

=== Climate ===
According to the Köppen Climate Classification system, Downey has a semi-arid climate, abbreviated BSk on climate maps.

=== Surrounding areas ===
Commerce
Bell Gardens Pico Rivera
South Gate Santa Fe Springs
South Gate Norwalk
Paramount / Bellflower

== Demographics ==
Historical population
Census	Pop.	Note	%±
1960	82,505		—
1970	88,573		7.4%
1980	82,602		−6.7%
1990	91,444		10.7%
2000	107,323		17.4%
2010	111,772		4.1%
2020	114,355		2.3%
U.S. Decennial Census; 1860–1870 1880-1890; 1900 1910 1920; 1930 1940 1950; 1960 1970 1980; 1990 2000 2010; 2020

Downey first appeared as a city in the 1960 U.S. census as part of the Downey-Norwalk census county division (pop. 272,729 in 1960).

Downey city, California – Racial and ethnic composition Note: the US Census treats Hispanic/Latino as an ethnic category. This table excludes Latinos from the racial categories and assigns them to a separate category. Hispanics/Latinos may be of any race.
Race / Ethnicity (NH = Non-Hispanic)	Pop 1980	Pop 1990	Pop 2000	Pop 2010	Pop 2020	% 1980	% 1990	% 2000	% 2010	% 2020
White alone (NH)	64,468	50,682	30,851	19,786	14,378	78.05%	55.42%	28.75%	17.70%	12.57%
Black or African American alone (NH)	764	2,876	3,717	3,834	3,930	0.92%	3.15%	3.46%	3.43%	3.44%
Native American or Alaska Native alone (NH)	444	446	328	212	251	0.54%	0.49%	0.31%	0.19%	0.22%
Asian alone (NH)	2,881	7,653	8,153	7,484	7,311	3.49%	8.37%	7.60%	6.70%	6.39%
Native Hawaiian or Pacific Islander alone (NH)	2,881	7,653	157	170	249	3.49%	8.37%	0.15%	0.15%	0.22%
Other Race alone (NH)	119	218	210	219	691	0.14%	0.24%	0.20%	0.20%	0.60%
Mixed race or Multiracial (NH)	x	x	1,818	1,071	1,679	x	x	1.69%	0.96%	1.47%
Hispanic or Latino (any race)	13,926	29,569	62,089	78,996	85,866	16.86%	32.34%	57.85%	70.68%	75.09%
Total	82,602	91,444	107,323	111,772	114,355	100.00%	100.00%	100.00%	100.00%	100.00%

=== 2020 ===
The 2020 United States census reported that Downey had a population of 114,355. The population density was 9,215.5 inhabitants per square mile (3,558.1/km^{2}). The racial makeup of Downey was 23.4% White, 3.7% African American, 2.1% Native American, 6.7% Asian, 0.3% Pacific Islander, 40.0% from other races, and 23.9% from two or more races. Hispanic or Latino of any race were 75.1% of the population.

The census reported that 99.0% of the population lived in households, 0.5% lived in non-institutionalized group quarters, and 0.5% were institutionalized.

There were 35,017 households, out of which 40.1% included children under the age of 18, 48.4% were married-couple households, 7.9% were cohabiting couple households, 27.2% had a female householder with no partner present, and 16.4% had a male householder with no partner present. 16.7% of households were one person, and 6.4% were one person aged 65 or older. The average household size was 3.23. There were 27,251 families (77.8% of all households).

The age distribution was 22.2% under the age of 18, 10.2% aged 18 to 24, 28.9% aged 25 to 44, 25.4% aged 45 to 64, and 13.3% who were 65 years of age or older. The median age was 36.6 years. For every 100 females, there were 94.9 males.

There were 36,087 housing units at an average density of 2,908.1 units per square mile (1,122.8 units/km^{2}), of which 35,017 (97.0%) were occupied. Of these, 50.0% were owner-occupied, and 50.0% were occupied by renters.

In 2023, the US Census Bureau estimated that the median household income was $87,400, and the per capita income was $37,122. About 7.0% of families and 9.1% of the population were below the poverty line.

=== 2010 ===
Homes in Downey
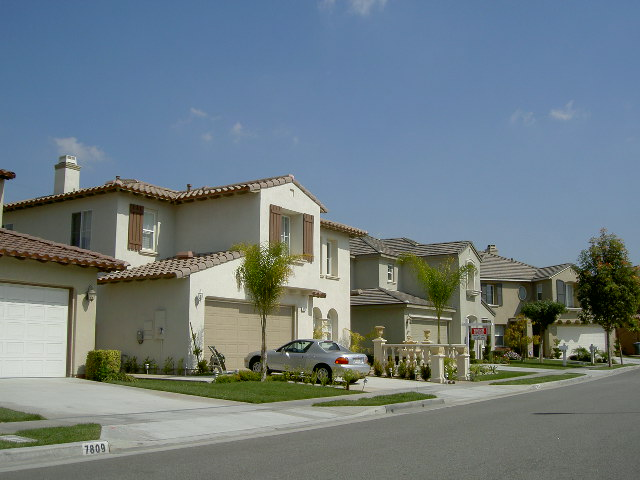
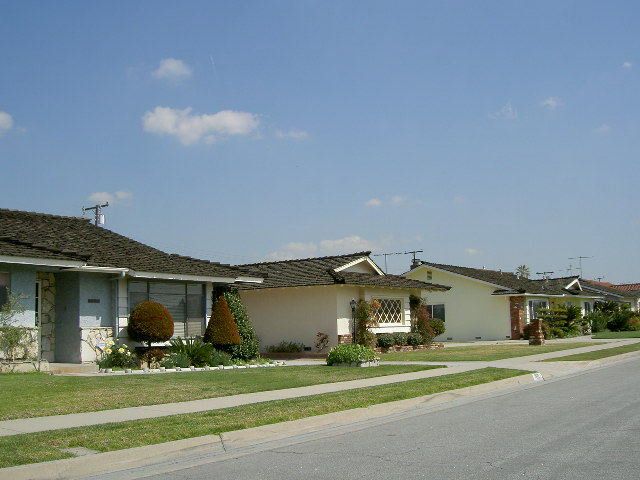

The 2010 United States census reported that Downey had a population of 111,772. The population density was 8,893.3 inhabitants per square mile (3,433.7/km^{2}). The racial makeup of Downey was 63,255 (56.6%) White, 19,784 (17.7%) Non-Hispanic White, 7,804 (7.0%) Asian (2.2% Korean, 2.2% Filipino, 0.6% Indian, 0.5% Chinese, 0.3% Vietnamese, 0.3% Japanese, 0.2% Thai, 0.1% Cambodian, 0.1% Pakistani), 4,329 (3.9%) African American, 820 (0.7%) Native American, 221 (0.2%) Pacific Islander, 30,797 (27.6%) from other races, and 4,546 (4.1%) from two or more races. Hispanic or Latino of any race were 78,996 persons (70.7%); 54.0% of Downey residents are of Mexican ancestry, 3.9% Salvadoran, 2.0% Cuban, 2.0% Guatemalan, 1.1% Peruvian, and 1.0% Nicaraguan ancestry.

The Census reported that 111,089 people (99.4% of the population) lived in households, 122 (0.1%) lived in non-institutionalized group quarters, and 561 (0.5%) were institutionalized.

There were 33,936 households, out of which 15,697 (46.3%) had children under the age of 18 living in them, 17,405 (51.3%) were opposite-sex married couples living together, 6,289 (18.5%) had a female householder with no husband present, 2,796 (8.2%) had a male householder with no wife present. There were 2,357 (6.9%) POSSLQ, and 225 (0.7%) same-sex married couples or partnerships. 5,721 households (16.9%) were made up of individuals, and 2,211 (6.5%) had someone living alone who was 65 years of age or older. The average household size was 3.27. There were 26,490 families (78.1% of all households); the average family size was 3.68.

The population was spread out, with 29,972 people (26.8%) under the age of 18, 12,108 people (10.8%) aged 18 to 24, 33,056 people (29.6%) aged 25 to 44, 25,057 people (22.4%) aged 45 to 64, and 11,579 people (10.4%) who were 65 years of age or older. The median age was 33.3 years. For every 100 females, there were 94.1 males. For every 100 females aged 18 and over, there were 90.4 males.

There were 35,601 housing units at an average density of 2,832.7 units per square mile (1,093.7 units/km^{2}), of which 17,135 (50.5%) were owner-occupied, and 16,801 (49.5%) were occupied by renters. The homeowner vacancy rate was 1.4%; the rental vacancy rate was 4.9%. 59,555 people (53.3% of the population) lived in owner-occupied housing units and 51,534 people (46.1%) lived in rental housing units. Approximately 30–40 homeless reside in the area.

According to the 2010 United States census, Downey had a median household income of $60,939, with 11.8% of the population living below the federal poverty line.

=== Mapping L.A. ===
According to Mapping L.A., Mexican and German were the most common ancestries in Downey in 2000. Mexico and Korea were the most common foreign places of birth.

=== Mexican Americans and Latinos ===
By 2020 Downey, which was previously heavily Anglo (non-Latino) White, became known as the "Mexican Beverly Hills" due to housing wealthy people of Mexican origin. The Hispanic population increased after the Immigration Reform and Control Act of 1986. Erick Galindo in The New York Times described Downey as "an aspirational suburb for Latinos in Los Angeles." In 2020 Blanca Pacheco became the mayor; she was the first woman of Latin American origins to hold that position.

=== Homelessness ===
In 2022, Los Angeles Homeless Services Authority's Greater Los Angeles Homeless Count counted 218 homeless individuals in Downey.

Homeless population
Year	Pop.	±%
2016	200	—
2017	124	−38.0%
2018	180	+45.2%
2019	174	−3.3%
2020	258	+48.3%
2022	218	−15.5%
Source: Greater Los Angeles Homeless Count; Los Angeles Homeless Services Authority

== Crime ==
While reports of robberies, aggravated assaults, and petty thefts in Downey dropped in 2008, auto thefts reached a 10-year high. In 2008, 1,231 vehicles were reported stolen in Downey. Other crimes recorded by the FBI Crime Index for the year 2008 include 252 robberies, 172 aggravated assaults, 24 rapes, 711 burglaries, and 2,038 acts of larceny/thefts.

=== Anti-gang activities ===
In the late 1980s and early 1990s, Downey saw an increase in gang activity. Today there is still gang activity going in the south area of Downey. In response, Downey formed GOOD (Gangs Out Of Downey), a community-based organization that helps encourage young people between the ages of 10–20 to stay away from gangs. GOOD is also responsible for organizing many community events and programs such as various sports, after-school care, scholarship programs for at-risk students looking to attend college, and counseling for both young people and their parents. GOOD has kept a close partnership with the Downey Police Department.

== Economy ==
=== Most Business-Friendly Award ===
In 2017, the City of Downey was recognized as L.A. County's "Most Business-Friendly City" by the Los Angeles County Economic Development Corporation for cities with a population greater than 68,000.

=== Largest employers ===
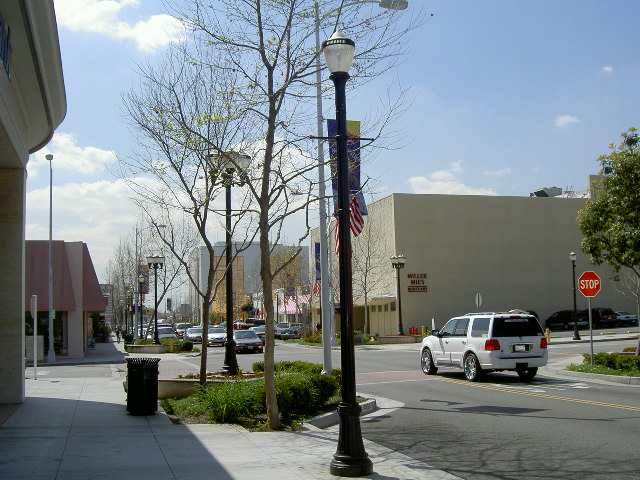
Downtown Downey

According to the city's 2024 Comprehensive Annual Financial Report, the top employers in the city are:

#	Employer	# of Employees
1	Kaiser Permanente	6,512
2	Rancho Los Amigos National Rehabilitation Center	2,052
3	Stonewood Center	2,000
4	Office of Education, County of Los Angeles	1,665
5	Downey Unified School District	1,363
6	PIH Health Hospital – Downey	1,146
7	Coca-Cola Refreshments	1,054
8	City of Downey	750
9	Internal Service Department, County of Los Angeles	712
10	Lakewood Health Center	434

== Government ==
In the California State Legislature, Downey is in the 30th senatorial district, represented by Democrat Bob Archuleta, and in the 64th Assembly district, represented by Democrat Blanca Pacheco.

In the United States House of Representatives, Downey is in California's 42nd congressional district, represented by Democrat Robert Garcia.

Los Angeles County Animal Care Services operates the Downey Animal Care Center in Downey.

== Culture ==
The author Tom Wolfe wrote about Downey. His article "The Hair Boys" was about Harvey's Drive-in and the fashions that the hair boys wore. He claimed that Harvey's was one of the great unacknowledged centers of fashion in the world. The essay appears in his 1968 book "The Pump House Gang." His drawing of one of the hair boys appears in his book "In Our Time."

In 1955, Downey was featured in newspapers worldwide when truck driver George Di Peso lived at 7739 Alderdale Street and had a gopher problem. He tried to solve it by putting a hose down a gopher hole and turning on the water to drown it, but could not get the hose out afterwards. He then noticed that the hose was slowly being pulled down the hole. Wire services found out about this, and the mysterious phenomenon was reported in newspapers worldwide. According to a July 3, 1955, front-page article in the Los Angeles Times ("Tokyo Awaits Arrival of Downey Hose"), "A message received from Tokyo at the United Press office here read 'Tell Di Peso in Downey the other end of his hose has not turned up here, but we're all still looking.'" There was a great deal of speculation about the cause of the disappearing hose. Eventually the hose vanished completely. The most likely explanation was that there was an underground river that pulled at the hose.

In the early 1960s, it was widely reported that the Downey City Library had banned Edgar Rice Burroughs' Tarzan books because Tarzan was not married to Jane when they conceived Boy. Evidence for the rumor's staying power is in articles in the Los Angeles Times that were published in the 1970s (for example, "Downey Sends L.A. Back to the Bush League," Jack Smith, May 8, 1970). The rumor about Tarzan was, however, an exaggeration. According to "Zane Grey Also Safe: Tarzan’s Marital Status No Issue as Downey School Ban Is Denied" (Los Angeles Times December 28, 1961), a rumor spread that one of Downey's elementary schools had removed Edgar Rice Burroughs and Zane Grey books from its library because "1—There was no indication that Tarzan and his mate, Jane, were ever married before they took up housekeeping in the treetops," and "2—Grey was known to put such expletives as 'damn!’ and 'hell' in the mouths of his western cowhands." It turns out that there was no "ban." What happened was that in one elementary school, a parent had put two Zane Grey books "out of site in a desk drawer." No Tarzan books were involved. The Zane Grey books were put back on the shelves.

== Education ==
=== Primary and secondary schools ===
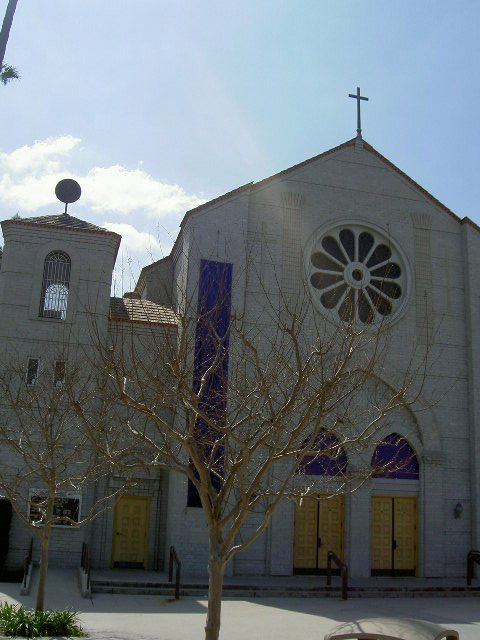
Our Lady of Perpetual Help, Catholic parish church in Downey

Most of Downey is within the Downey Unified School District. Downey's two main public high schools are named for Governor John G. Downey and Governor and Chief Justice of the United States Earl Warren.

Downey has three public high schools: Downey, Warren, and Columbus High School. Other public schools include:

- Stauffer Middle School (formerly West Middle School)
- Doty Middle School (formerly East Middle School)
- Griffiths Middle School (formerly North Middle School) It was named after a revered principal, Gordon Griffiths.
- Sussman Middle School (formerly South Middle School)
- Alameda Elementary School
- Carpenter Elementary School
- Gallatin Elementary School
- Gauldin Elementary School
- Garcia Elementary School (Formerly Imperial Elementary School)
- Lewis Elementary School
- Old River Elementary School
- Price Elementary School
- Rio Hondo Elementary School
- Rio San Gabriel Elementary School
- Unsworth Elementary School
- Ward Elementary School
- Williams Elementary School

Small sections are within the Montebello Unified School District. Another portion is in Little Lake City Elementary School District and Whittier Union High School District.

Private schools include:

- Calvary Chapel Christian School: pre-K–12
- St. Pius X-Matthias Academy: 9–12
- Our Lady of Perpetual Help School: TK-K–8
- Saint Raymond's Catholic School: pre-K–8
- Saint Mark's Episcopal School: pre-K–8

Roman Catholic schools are under the Roman Catholic Archdiocese of Los Angeles.

=== Public libraries ===
The Downey City Library serves the city. The first library in Downey was established in 1901 by a women's social club that was founded in 1898. The County of Los Angeles Public Library opened a branch in Downey in September 1915. The county branch moved several times; its final location was in the County Civic Center. In 1958 the Downey City Council voted to establish its own library and withdraw from the county system. The city library services were originally provided out of the back of a bookstore. The city library opened in the former cafeteria of the former Downey Elementary School, then being used as the city hall and police station, on July 1, 1958. A permanent library building was built on December 7, 1959. It had almost 16,000 square feet (1,500 m^{2}) and it was built for $186,200, costing $11.97 per square foot. It was dedicated on December 17 and opened on December 18. In February 1984 an addition of almost 12,000 square feet (1,100 m^{2}) was completed and dedicated.

In March 2019, the city announced that it would be using Measure S funds to begin remodeling on the city library. The remodeling was initially supposed to last 15 months, but the COVID-19 pandemic caused delays in the project. The remodeled city library opened on May 3, 2021, with notable updates including mobile app support for checkouts and a multi-use community space.

In addition, the headquarters of the County of Los Angeles Public Library are located in Downey.

== Infrastructure ==
=== Health care ===
The Los Angeles County Department of Public Health operates the Whittier Health Center in Whittier, serving Downey.

=== Post office ===
The United States Postal Service operates the Downey Post Office at 8111 Firestone Boulevard, the North Downey Post Office at 10409 Lakewood Boulevard, and the South Downey Post Office at 7911 Imperial Highway.

=== Transportation ===
Any of four freeways can conveniently reach the city: I-105 and the Metro C Line passes through the southern part of the city, I-5 passes through the northern region, I-605 passes along the eastern side, and I-710 passes just west of the city.

Los Angeles County Metropolitan Transportation Authority (Metro) provides bus services to the city and is served by Lakewood Boulevard station on the C Line. The city also operates a local bus service called DowneyLINK.

== Notable people ==
- Dave Alvin, musician, founder of Downey-based rockabilly band The Blasters with brother Phil
- Bob Bennett, contemporary Christian musician, singer-songwriter, recording artist, was born in Downey
- Paul Bigsby, father of the modern electric solid-body guitar, built in 1948, and creator of the Bigsby vibrato
- William Bonin, serial killer; was Downey resident during his crime spree
- The Carpenters (singer-musicians Karen and Richard) moved to Downey in 1963, originally to an apartment complex called the Shoji on 12020 Downey Ave, later moving to a house that still stands on Newville Avenue which can be seen on the cover of their album, Now & Then; after the duo's success, they built two apartment buildings still located on 5th St.
- Miranda Cosgrove, actress and singer, star of iCarly
- Art Cruz, musician and songwriter, current drummer of Lamb of God
- Joslyn Davis, host of Clevver TV and YouTube personality, was raised in Downey
- Rosario DeSimone (1873–1946), Downey-based crime boss
- Walt Faulkner, Indy car driver, first rookie to win pole position at Indianapolis 500
- Ed Fiori, professional golfer
- Terry Forcum, 1983 World Champion professional long drive golfer was born in Downey
- Ty France, professional baseball player
- Donavon Frankenreiter, surfer and musician
- Kevin Gross, former Major League Baseball pitcher for Los Angeles Dodgers and Anaheim Angels
- Dan Henderson, mixed martial artist
- Demos Shakarian, businessman and founder of Full Gospel Business Men's Fellowship International
- Brian Haner, Musician/Comedian
- James Hetfield, Metallica frontman
- Leon Hooten, former baseball player for Oakland Athletics
- Robert Illes, Emmy-winning TV writer and producer
- Allison Iraheta, musician, American Idol Season 8 contestant
- Kerry King, Slayer guitarist
- Evan Longoria, an All-Star third baseman for the Tampa Bay Rays, San Francisco Giants and Arizona Diamondbacks, was born in Downey
- Darren McCaughan, professional baseball player for the Seattle Mariners, was raised in Downey.
- Ira J. McDonald, Los Angeles City Council member, 1941–43, Downey civic leader
- Ron McGovney, original Metallica bassist, spent school years in Downey
- Bob Meusel, baseball star for New York Yankees who played with Babe Ruth and Lou Gehrig, lived and died in Downey
- Riki R. Nelson, oil painter
- Tom Nieto, professional baseball player
- George Pajon Jr., Grammy Award-winning recording and performing artist
- Lena Park, South Korean singer
- Wayne Rainey, former American Grand Prix motorcycle racer, was born in Downey
- Kimmy Robertson, actress best known for her role as Lucy Moran in Twin Peaks
- Rich Rodriguez, Major League Baseball pitcher 1990–2003
- Paul Ruffner, pro basketball player
- Kenneth Shelley, figure skater, U.S. champion and Olympian, was born in Downey
- Dennis Sproul, NFL player
- JoJo Starbuck, figure skater, U.S. champion and Olympian, grew up in Downey
- Aimee Teegarden, actress (Friday Night Lights) and fashion model
- Alanna Ubach, actress
- Joan Weston, queen of Roller Derby, grew up in Downey
- "Weird Al" Yankovic, musician and parody artist, was born in Downey
- Andrew Robert Young, U.S. Ambassador to Burkina Faso (appointed 2016), was born in Downey.
- Stephanie Zavala, professional bowler, 2021 PWBA Rookie of the Year, resides in Downey.

== Sister cities ==
Downey's sister cities are:

- Alajuela, Costa Rica
- Efrat, Israel
- Fresnillo, Mexico
- Guadalajara, Mexico
- San Quintín, Mexico
- (Republic of Ireland) Taghmaconnell, Ireland

== Media ==
The Downey Patriot and Los Cerritos Community News serve the Downey community. The Los Angeles Times and the Press-Telegram are the daily newspapers that provide daily local coverage in Los Angeles County and the Gateway Cities region.
