= Tim Mixon =

American football player (born 1984)

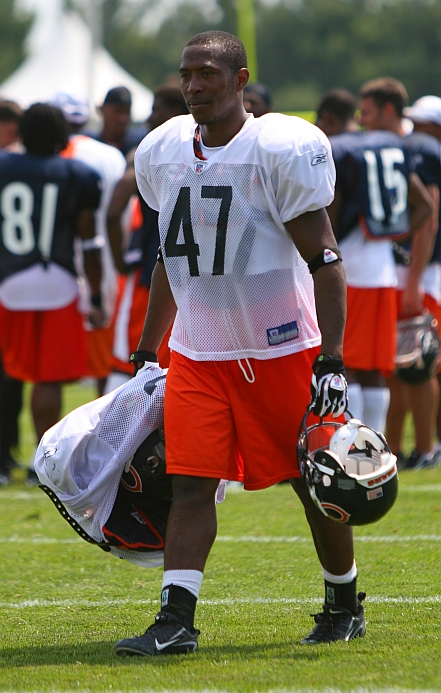
- Mixon at the Chicago Bears 2007 Training Camp

No. 47
- Position: Cornerback

Personal information
- Born: July 8, 1984 (age 42); Compton, California, U.S.
- Listed height: 5 ft 9 in (1.75 m)
- Listed weight: 184 lb (83 kg)

Career information
- High school: Dominguez (Compton, California)
- College: California
- NFL draft: 2007: undrafted

Career history
- Seattle Seahawks (2007)*; Chicago Bears (2007)*; Cleveland Browns (2007)*; New England Patriots (2007–2008)*
- * Offseason or practice squad member only

Timothy Mixon (born July 8, 1984) is an American former football cornerback. He was originally signed by the Seattle Seahawks as an undrafted free agent in 2007. He played college football at California.

Mixon was also a member of the Chicago Bears, Cleveland Browns, and New England Patriots.

== Early life ==
He played high school football at Dominguez High School in Compton.
