= San Gabriel Valley League =

High school athletic league in California

The Gateway League is a high school athletic league that is part of the CIF Southern Section. Members are located in southeastern Los Angeles County. The Gateway League was launched in 2022, replacing the San Gabriel Valley League

== Members ==
- Bellflower High School
- Dominguez High School
- Downey High School
- La Mirada High School
- Mayfair High School
- Warren High School

In the past Bellflower and Cerritos were members of the league.
