= Downey Unified School District =

School district in California, United States

Address
- 11627 Brookshire Avenue Downey, California, 90241; United States

District information
- Type: Public
- Grades: K–12
- NCES District ID: 0611460

Students and staff
- Students: 22,216
- Teachers: 903.84
- Staff: 1,107.35
- Student–teacher ratio: 24.58

Other information
- Website: web.dusd.net

Downey Unified School District ("DUSD") is a public school system in Downey, California, United States. It serves most of Downey and portions of Bellflower, Bell Gardens, and South Gate. The enrollment for 2009 is 22,500, divided among thirteen elementary, four middle, and three high schools.

== Governance ==
Downey Unified School District is governed by a 7-member Board of Education, which appoints a superintendent who runs the daily operations of the district. Members of the board are elected directly by voters from separate districts that encompass communities the DUSD serves. The district's superintendent is John A.Garcia, Jr., Ph.D. The members of the Board of Education include Tod M. Corrin, Giovanna Perez-Saab, Donald E. LaPlante, D. Mark Morris, Barbara R. Samperi, Martha E. Sodetani, and Nancy A. Swenson. Every DUSD household or residential area is zoned to an elementary school, middle school, and high school.

== Demographics ==
In 2003, there were 22,298 students. In 2004, the number of students climbed to 22,523 and then to 22,800 by 2005. In 2006, the number declined to 22,584. In 2007, the number of students declined further to 22,456. In terms of the dropout rate, 1.8% of Downey Unified School District's students dropped out of school compared to the 12.8% of students in the state. In 2003, 74.6% of the teachers held a bachelor's degree while 25.0% held a master's degree. Only 0.5% had a doctorate. In 2007, the average class size for the district was 22.8 students per teacher; this is opposed to 20.8 students per teacher for the state.

In terms of race and ethnicity in 2007, Hispanic students made up the vast majority (79.5%) of the district's student population. In addition, white students were the largest minority; they made up 11.0% of the district's student population. Asian and black students made up 4.7 and 3.8% of the district's student population respectively. The remaining 1.0% of the student population are mostly American Indian students. In addition, a majority of the school district's students (55.0%) were economically disadvantaged.

== Schools ==
Public schools include within the DUSD include Alameda Elementary, Carpenter Elementary, Gallatin Elementary, Gauldin Elementary, Imperial Elementary, Lewis Elementary, Old River Elementary, Price Elementary, Rio Hondo Elementary, Rio San Gabriel Elementary, Unsworth Elementary, Ward Elementary, Williams Elementary, Doty Middle, Griffiths Middle, Sussman Middle, Stauffer Middle, Downey High, Warren High, and Columbus Continuation.

== Protections For Transgender Students ==
In 2014, the district signed an agreement with the Department of Education to protect transgender students from abuse, allow them to use their preferred restroom, and use their preferred name in school.
