= Gahr High School =

Coordinates: 33.874°N 118.096°W

Richard Gahr High School

Location
- 11111 Artesia Boulevard; Cerritos, California 90703

Information
- School type: Public
- Founded: 1965
- School district: ABC Unified School District
- Superintendent: Gina Zietlow, EdD
- Principal: David Keys (since April 2026)
- Staff: 71.54 (FTE)
- Grades: 9-12
- Enrollment: 1,590 (2023–2024)
- Student to teacher ratio: 22.23
- Language: English
- Area: Greater Los Angeles Area
- Colours: Blue; White; Gold
- Athletics conference: San Gabriel Valley League
- Mascot: Gladiator
- Team name: Gladiators
- Rival: Artesia High School, Cerritos High School, Whitney High School
- Newspaper: Gahr Forum
- Website: gahrhs.us

Richard Gahr High School, often simply known as Gahr High School, is a public, STEAM (Science, Technology, Engineering, Art, and Math) magnet high school in Cerritos, California, serving grades 9-12. Gahr High is one of three comprehensive high schools in the ABC Unified School District.

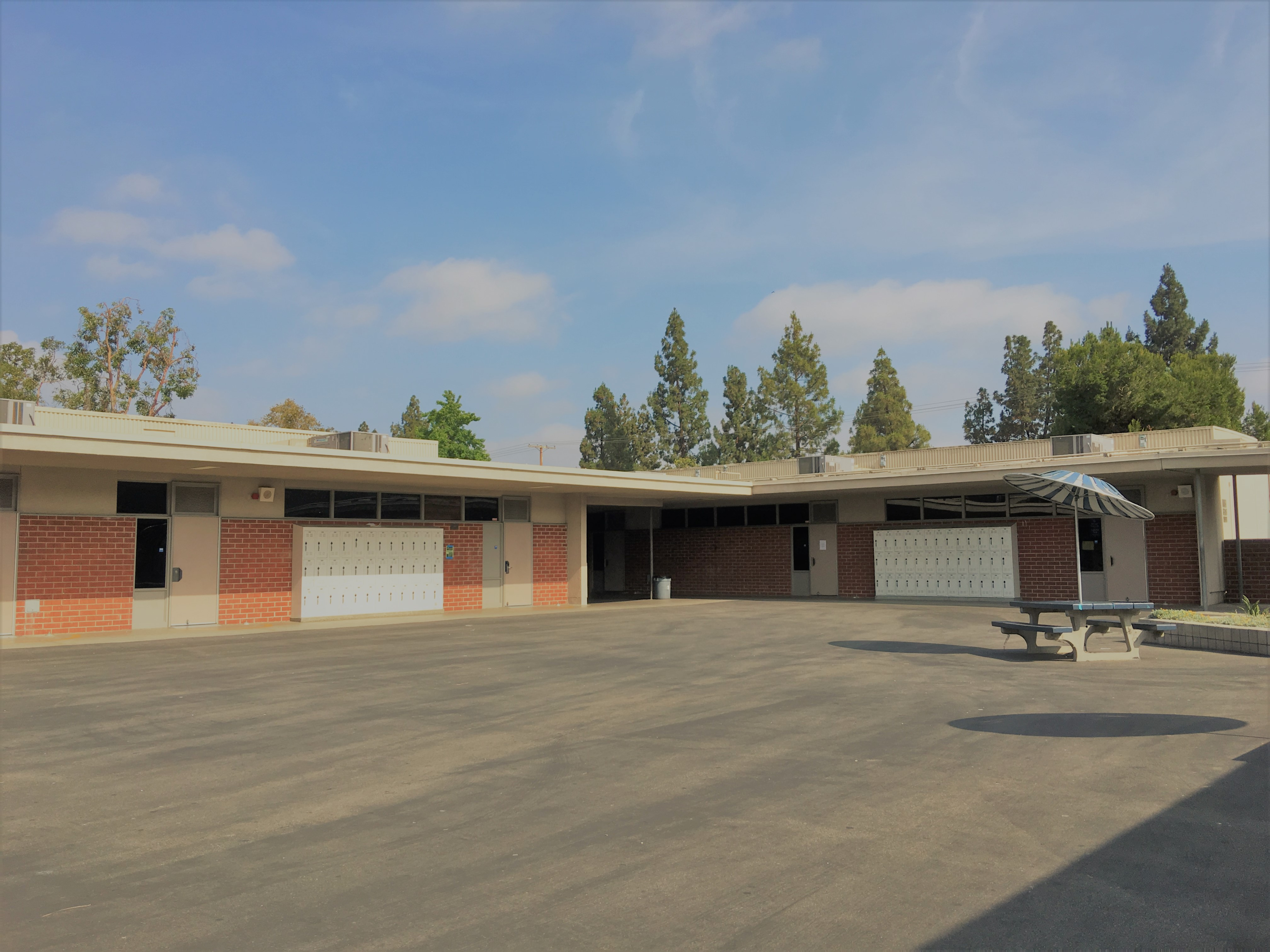
Social Science and English Building

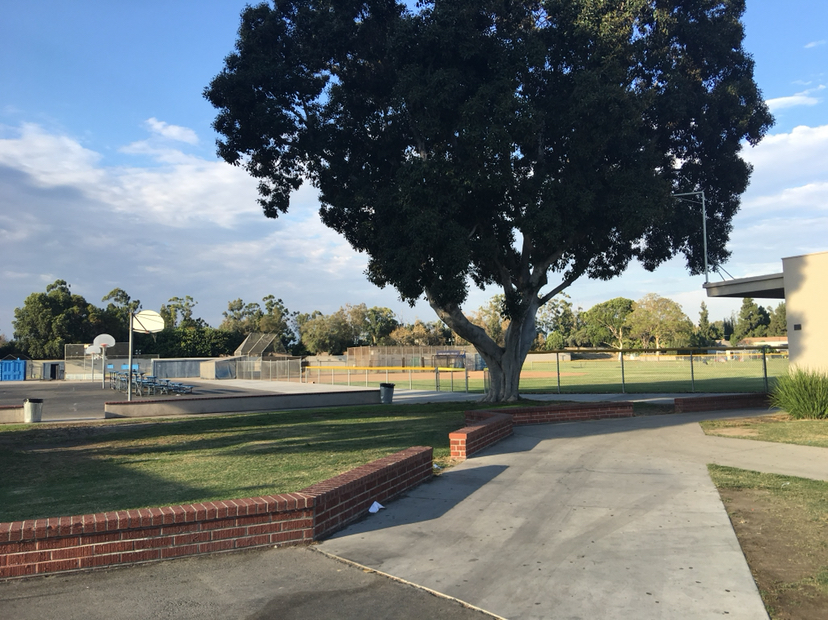
Gahr's baseball field

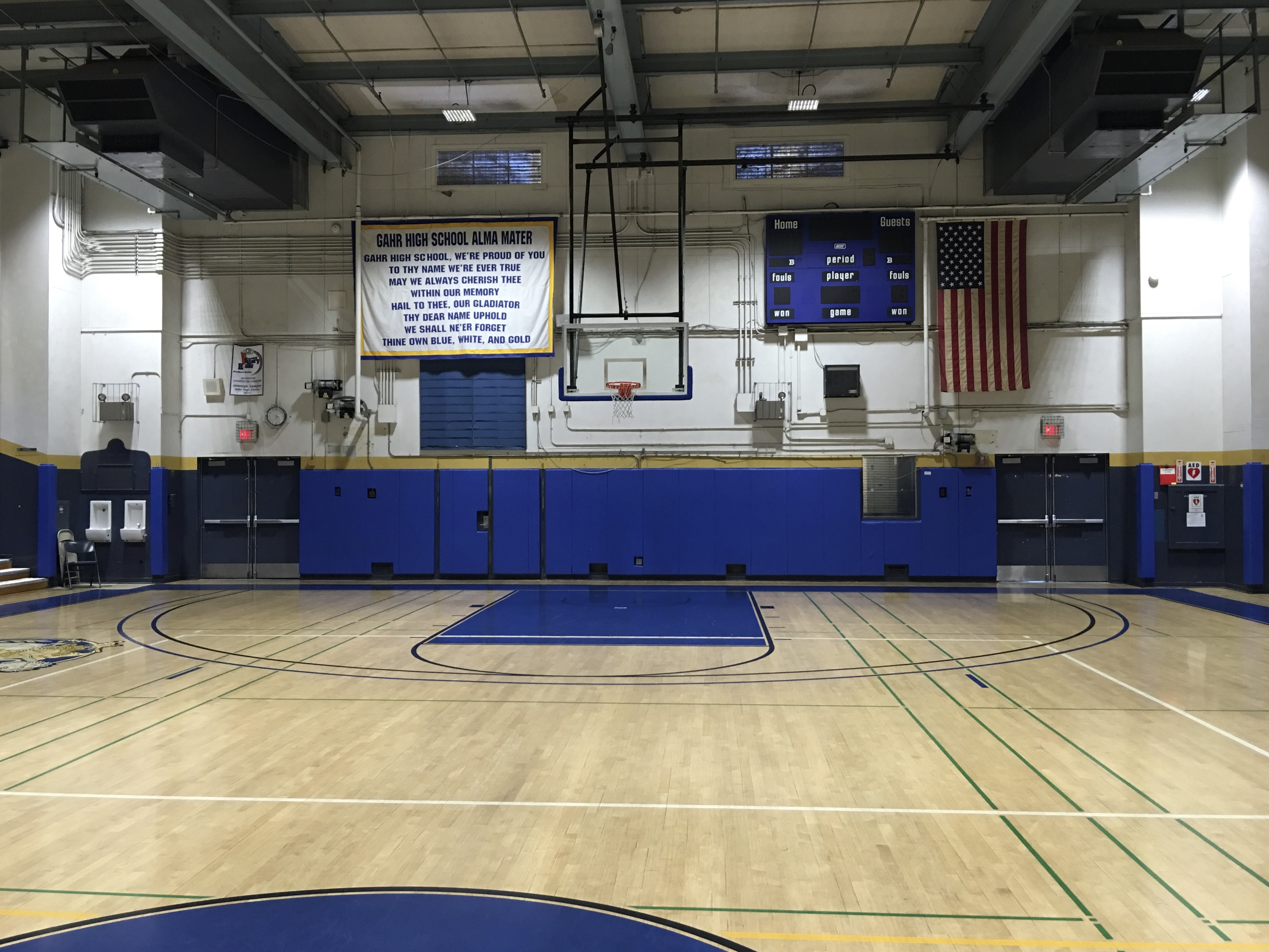
Gahr's basketball court inside gym

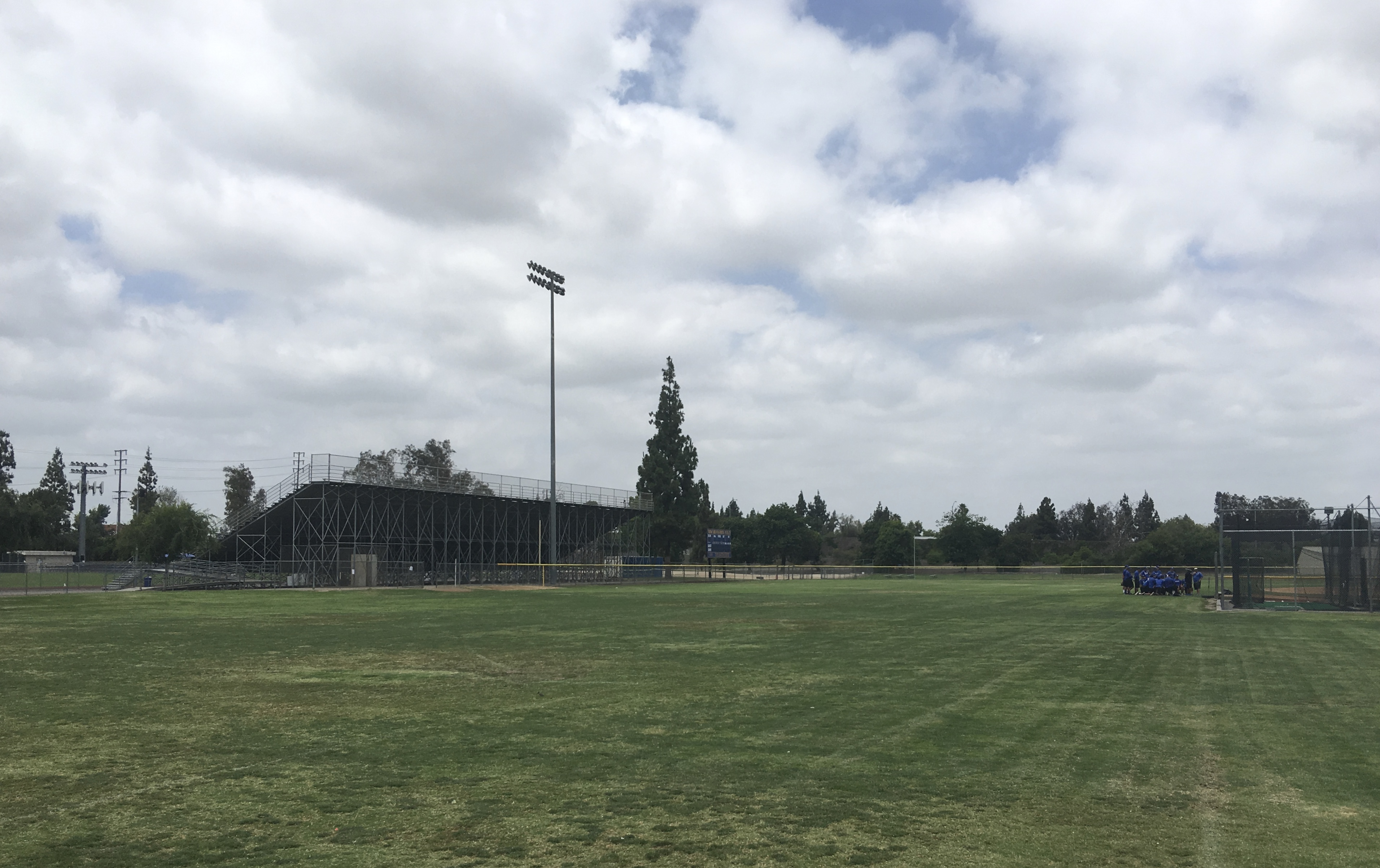
Gahr's soccer field

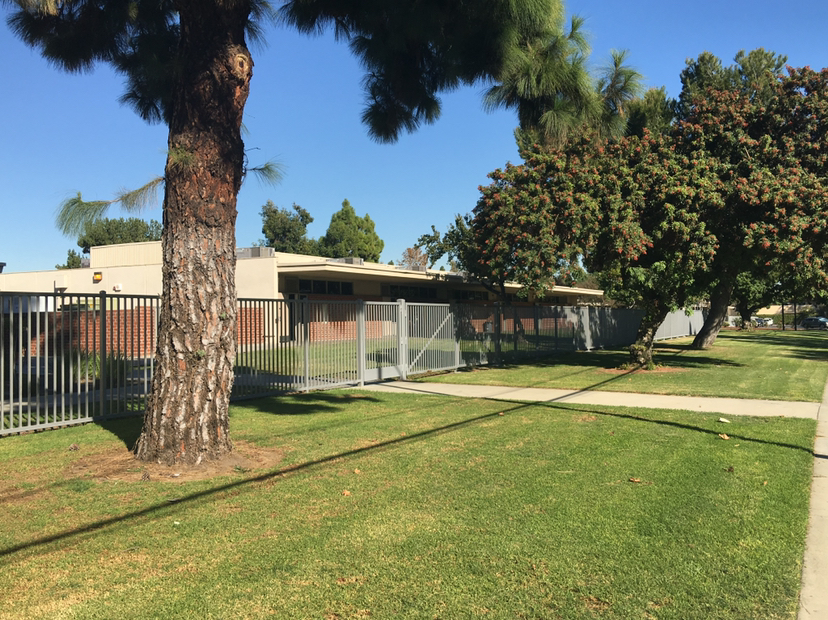
Gahr campus front view in 2015

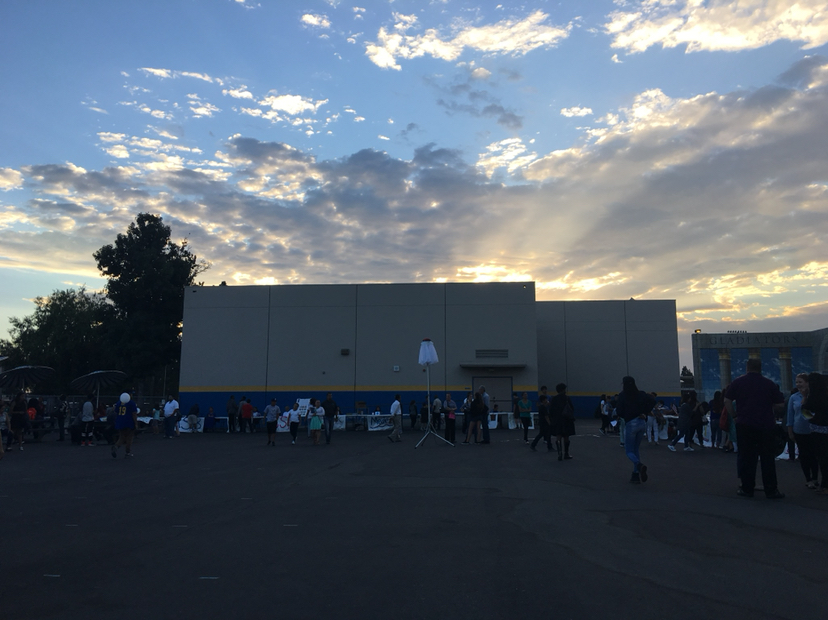
On campus "Back to School Night" Sep 2016

The school is a two-time (2007, 2021) California Distinguished School. It is opposite to Artesia Cemetery.

== History ==
Gahr High School opened 61 years ago in 1965 as the first high school in both the newly unified ABC Unified School District, and the recently incorporated City of Dairy Valley (the city would be renamed to its current state two years later). The school was officially named after Richard Gahr, who had served as the school district's superintendent. During the 1970s, as the student population in Cerritos rapidly grew, Cerritos High School was created for district expansion, and during its construction the latter used part of the Gahr campus.

== Academics ==
=== Enrollment ===
As of the school year 2021–22, there were a total of 1,828 students attending the high school.

- Hispanic or Latino - 52.5% (959)
- Black - 14.1% (258)
- Asian - 12.9% (236)
- Filipino - 10.2% (186)
- White - 6.3% (116)
- Other/Unreported - 4.0% (73)

=== Awards ===
The school is a two-time (2007, 2021) California Distinguished School.

== Notable alumni ==
- Bret Barberie (1985) - Major League Baseball player (1991–1996)
- Micah Bernard (2019) - college football running back for the Utah Utes
- Morris Chestnut (1986) - actor (Boyz n the Hood, Rosewood, Watson)
- Chris Devenski (2008) - Major League Baseball player, Pitcher, Houston Astros (2016– )
- Jake Faria (2011) - Major League Baseball player, Tampa Bay Rays of Major League Baseball (MLB) (2017–2019), Milwaukee Brewers of Major League Baseball (MLB) (2019– )
- Shane Mack (1981) - Major League Baseball player (1990–1994)
- Kris Medlen (2003) - Major League Baseball pitcher for the Atlanta Braves
- Tom Nieto (1978) - Major League Baseball player (1984–1990)
- Al Osuna (1983) - Major League Baseball player (1990–1994, 1996)
- Valentino Pascucci (1996) - Major League Baseball player.
- Nicolle Payne (1994) - UCLA water polo goalie; Silver medalist in 2000 Sydney Olympics; Bronze medalist in 2004 Athens Olympics.
- Joshua Perkins (2011) - National Football League tight end (2016- )
- Steve Shak (1996) - Pro Soccer player and first round draft pick of MLS Superdraft in 2000, played for the NY Metro-Stars and the Colorado Rapids.
- Broderick Thompson (1978) - National Football League player (1984, 1986–1996)
- Casper Ware (2008) - NCAA basketball player for the Long Beach State 49ers.
- Dwayne Washington (2012) - National Football League running back New Orleans Saints (2018– )
- Jim Zorn (1971) - Seattle Seahawks quarterback (1976–1987); Head Coach of the Washington Redskins (2008–2009).
