= Manuel Dominguez High School =

Location
- 15301 S. San Jose; Compton, California; United States
- Coordinates: 33.893893°N 118.182310°W

Information
- Type: Public high school
- Established: 1957
- School district: Compton Unified School District
- Principal: Caleb Oliver
- Faculty: 74.56 (FTE)
- Grades: 9–12
- Enrollment: 1,616 (2022–2023)
- Student to teacher ratio: 21.67
- Campus: Urban
- Colors: Black, Red, and Gold
- Athletics conference: San Gabriel Valley League
- Nickname: Dons
- Rival: Lynwood High School
- Yearbook: El Espejo
- Website: Dominguez HS

Manuel Dominguez High School is a four-year public high school located in Compton, California. It is part of the Compton Unified School District.

== Name ==
Dominguez High School is named after Don Manuel Domínguez, a California rancher. Domínguez inherited from his father José Cristobal Domínguez over 75,000 acres which was originally granted to his father's uncle Juan José Domínguez by the King of Spain in 1784. The land holding covered an area that ran from Redondo Beach into the west, to Compton in the east and the harbor in the south. The rancho spread across a territory that comprises neighborhoods that are now Compton, Gardena, Carson, Redondo Beach, Torrance, Palos Verdes Estates, Lomita, Rolling Hills Estates, Rancho Palos Verdes, San Pedro, Wilmington, Harbor City, and part of Long Beach.

== Extracurricular activities ==
=== Athletics ===
The school's main rival is Lynwood High School. The football team was led by coach Willie Donerson and his son Keith Donerson for over thirty years. It forms a part of the CIF Southern Section, and San Gabriel Valley League. The Dominguez Football team has produced many NCAA and NFL football players such as Greg Townsend, Richard Sherman, Jeron Johnson, Bruce Walker and Chilo Rachal. The Dominguez basketball team also has a strong tradition, having produced NBA players such as Cedric Ceballos, Tyson Chandler, Brandon Jennings, Dennis Johnson and Tayshaun Prince.

=== Marching Band History ===
The Dominguez High School Red & Gold Soul Marching Band have performed at the Nickelodeon Kid's Choice Awards, Home Depot Battle of the Bands, Nike ads, Boost Mobile basketball tournaments, Major League Baseball Urban Youth Academy games and L.A. Sparks Season Openers.

=== Theatre ===
In 2000, educators Catherine Borek, Karen Greene and an all-student cast produced the first theatrical production to take place at Dominguez in over two decades. Their process of mounting the production of Thornton Wilder's Our Town is the subject of a 2002 documentary by Scott Hamilton Kennedy entitled OT: Our Town.

== Notable alumni ==
- Hubie Brooks Jr., former Major League Baseball player
- Kevin Burnett, former National Football League player
- Cedric Ceballos, former NBA basketball player
- Tyson Chandler, former professional basketball player, player development coach for the Dallas Mavericks, 2011 NBA champion, and Olympic gold medalist
- MC Eiht, rapper
- Travon Free, comedian, actor, writer, and former college basketball player
- Daren Gilbert, former NFL Player
- Jordan Hamilton, professional basketball player for Hapoel Tel Aviv
- Willie Hurst, former professional football player for the BC Lions
- Brandon Jennings, former professional basketball player (transferred to Oak Hill Academy before graduating)
- Dennis Johnson former professional basketball player (Hall of Famer)
- Jeron Johnson, NFL player Washington Redskins, Super Bowl XLVIII champion for the Seattle Seahawks
- Ken Landreaux, former Major League Baseball player
- Lionel Larry USA Gold Medal 2009 IAAF World Championships 4x400 relay
- MC Ren (Lorenzo Patterson), member of the rap-group N.W.A
- Tim Mixon, professional football player
- Tayshaun Prince, NBA champion for the 2003-04 Detroit Pistons, Last played for the NBA's Minnesota Timberwolves
- Chilo Rachal, professional NFL American football Former player of the Chicago Bears
- Paul Rodriguez, stand-up comedian and actor
- Jim Rooker, former Major League Baseball player. Pittsburgh Pirates World Series pitcher.
- Richard Sherman, Super Bowl XLVIII champion for the Seattle Seahawks, currently a free agent
- Greg Townsend, former NFL player
- Tweedy Bird Loc (Richard Johnson), rapper, organized the hip hop project Bloods & Crips
- Bruce Walker, former NFL Player
- Eazy-E (Eric Lynn Wright), member of the rap- group N.W.A, founder and CEO of Ruthless Records, father of Lil Eazy-E
- Lil Eazy-E, rapper and son of Eazy-E
