= List of high schools in Orange County, California =

This is a list of high schools in Orange County, California. It includes public and private schools and is arranged by school district (public schools) or affiliation (private schools).

== Public schools ==
=== Anaheim Union High School District ===
- Anaheim High School, Anaheim
- Cypress High School, Cypress
- John F. Kennedy High School, La Palma
- Katella High School, Anaheim
- Loara High School, Anaheim
- Magnolia High School, Anaheim
- Oxford Academy, Cypress
- Savanna High School, Anaheim
- Western High School, Anaheim

=== Brea Olinda Unified School District ===
- Brea Olinda High School, Brea

=== Capistrano Unified School District ===
- Aliso Niguel High School, Aliso Viejo
- Capistrano Valley High School, Mission Viejo
- Dana Hills High School, Dana Point
- San Clemente High School, San Clemente
- San Juan Hills High School, San Juan Capistrano
- Tesoro High School, Rancho Santa Margarita

=== Fullerton Joint Union High School District ===
- Buena Park High School, Buena Park
- Fullerton Union High School, Fullerton
- La Habra High School, La Habra
- Sonora High School, La Habra
- Sunny Hills High School, Fullerton
- Troy High School, Fullerton

=== Garden Grove Unified School District ===
- Bolsa Grande High School, Garden Grove
- Garden Grove High School, Garden Grove
- La Quinta High School, Westminster
- Los Amigos High School, Fountain Valley
- Pacifica High School, Garden Grove
- Rancho Alamitos High School, Garden Grove
- Santiago High School, Garden Grove

=== Huntington Beach Union High School District ===
- Edison High School, Huntington Beach
- Fountain Valley High School, Fountain Valley
- Huntington Beach High School, Huntington Beach
- Marina High School, Huntington Beach
- Ocean View High School, Huntington Beach
- Westminster High School, Westminster

=== Irvine Unified School District ===
- Irvine High School, Irvine
- Northwood High School, Irvine
- Portola High School, Irvine
- University High School, Irvine
- Woodbridge High School, Irvine

=== Laguna Beach Unified School District ===
- Laguna Beach High School, Laguna Beach

=== Los Alamitos Unified School District ===
- Los Alamitos High School, Los Alamitos

=== Newport-Mesa Unified School District ===
- Corona del Mar High School, Newport Beach
- Costa Mesa High School, Costa Mesa
- Estancia High School, Costa Mesa
- Newport Harbor High School, Newport Beach

=== Orange Unified School District ===
- Canyon High School, Anaheim
- El Modena High School, Orange
- Orange High School, Orange
- Villa Park High School, Villa Park

=== Placentia-Yorba Linda Unified School District ===
- El Dorado High School, Placentia
- Esperanza High School, Anaheim
- Valencia High School, Placentia
- Yorba Linda High School, Yorba Linda

=== Saddleback Valley Unified School District ===
- El Toro High School, Lake Forest
- Laguna Hills High School, Laguna Hills
- Mission Viejo High School, Mission Viejo
- Trabuco Hills High School, Mission Viejo

=== Santa Ana Unified School District ===
- Century High School, Santa Ana
- Godinez Fundamental High School, Santa Ana
- Saddleback High School, Santa Ana
- Santa Ana High School, Santa Ana
- Segerstrom Fundamental High School, Santa Ana
- Valley High School, Santa Ana
- Middle College High School, Santa Ana California

=== Tustin Unified School District ===
- Arnold O. Beckman High School, Irvine
- Foothill High School (Tustin), North Tustin
- Tustin High School, Tustin

=== Alternative/Continuation ===
- Albor Charter School, Santa Ana
- Back Bay High School, Costa Mesa
- Brea Canyon Alternative High School, Brea
- California Preparatory Academy, San Juan Capistrano
- Cesar Chavez High School, Santa Ana
- Coast High School, Huntington Beach
- Creekside High School, Irvine
- Early College High School, Costa Mesa
- El Camino High School, Placentia
- Gilbert High School, Anaheim
- Hillview High School (Orange County, California), North Tustin
- Junipero Serra High School, San Juan Capistrano
- La Entrada High School, Yorba Linda
- La Sierra High School, Fullerton
- La Vista High School, Fullerton
- Lorin Griset Academy, Santa Ana
- Marie L. Hare High School, Garden Grove
- Middle College High School, Santa Ana
- Monte Vista High School, Costa Mesa
- Orange County High School of the Arts, Santa Ana
- Polaris High School, Anaheim
- Richland Continuation High School, Orange
- San Joaquin High School, Irvine
- Silverado High School, Mission Viejo
- Valley Vista High School, Fountain Valley

== Private schools ==
=== Catholic ===
==== Diocesan ====
- Mater Dei High School, Santa Ana
- Rosary Academy, Fullerton
- Santa Margarita Catholic High School, Rancho Santa Margarita

==== Independent ====
- Cornelia Connelly High School, Anaheim
- Padre Pio Academy, Garden Grove
- JSerra Catholic High School, San Juan Capistrano
- St. Michael's Preparatory School, Silverado
- Servite High School, Anaheim

=== Protestant ===
==== Seventh-day Adventist ====
- Orangewood Academy

==== Non-denominational ====
- Brethren Christian Junior/Senior High School, Huntington Beach
- Calvary Chapel High School, Santa Ana
- Capistrano Valley Christian Schools, San Juan Capistrano
- Crystal Cathedral High School, Garden Grove
- Grace OC Academy, Anaheim
- Newport Christian School, Newport Beach
- Pacifica Christian High School, Newport Beach (Note: Previously the site of Newport Christian High School, formerly known as Huntington Valley Christian High School)
- Saddleback Valley Christian School, San Juan Capistrano
- Spirit Christian Academy, Tustin
- Whittier Christian High School, La Habra

==== Episcopal ====
- St. Margaret's Episcopal School

==== Lutheran ====
- Crean Lutheran High School, Irvine
- Lutheran High School of Orange County, Orange

=== Jewish ===
- Hebrew Academy OC
- Tarbut V' Torah Community Day School

=== Islamic ===
- Orange Crescent School, Garden Grove

=== Nonsectarian ===
- Acaciawood Preparatory Academy, Anaheim
- Alton School, Cypress
- Eldorado-Emerson, Orange
- Fairmont Preparatory Academy, Anaheim
- Florence Crittenton School, Fullerton
- Fusion Academy & Learning Center, Huntington Beach
- Fusion Academy & Learning Center, Mission Viejo
- Halstrom High School, Mission Viejo
- Sage Hill School, Newport Beach
- Silverleaf Academy, Mission Viejo
- The Tesla Academy, Irvine
- Waldorf School of Orange County, Costa Mesa
- Pacific Academy, Irvine

== See also ==
- List of high schools in Los Angeles County, California
- List of high schools in San Diego County, California
- List of high schools in California
- List of school districts in Orange County, California
- List of closed secondary schools in California
