= Outline of Santa Ana, California =

Santa Ana, California
- City
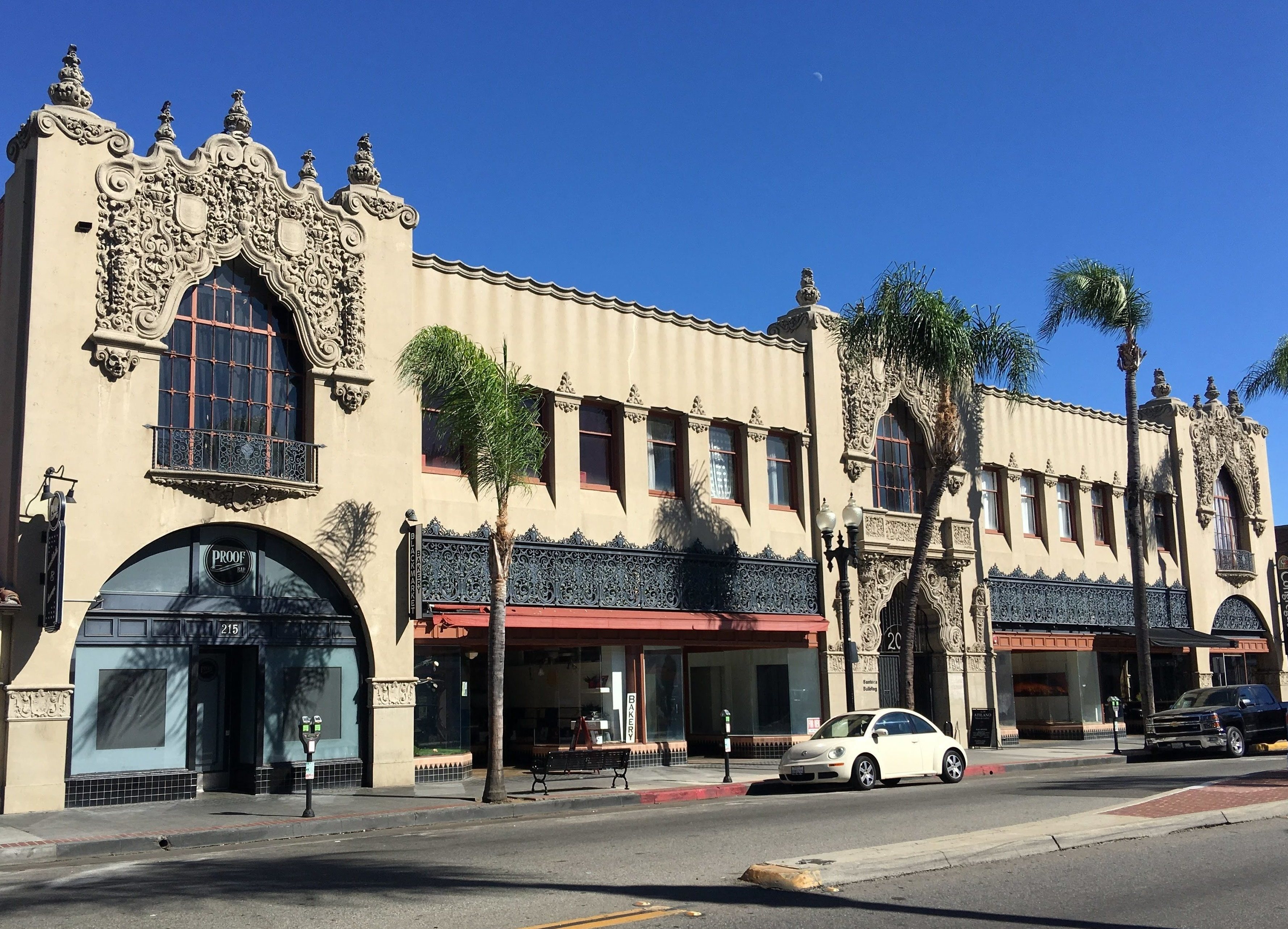
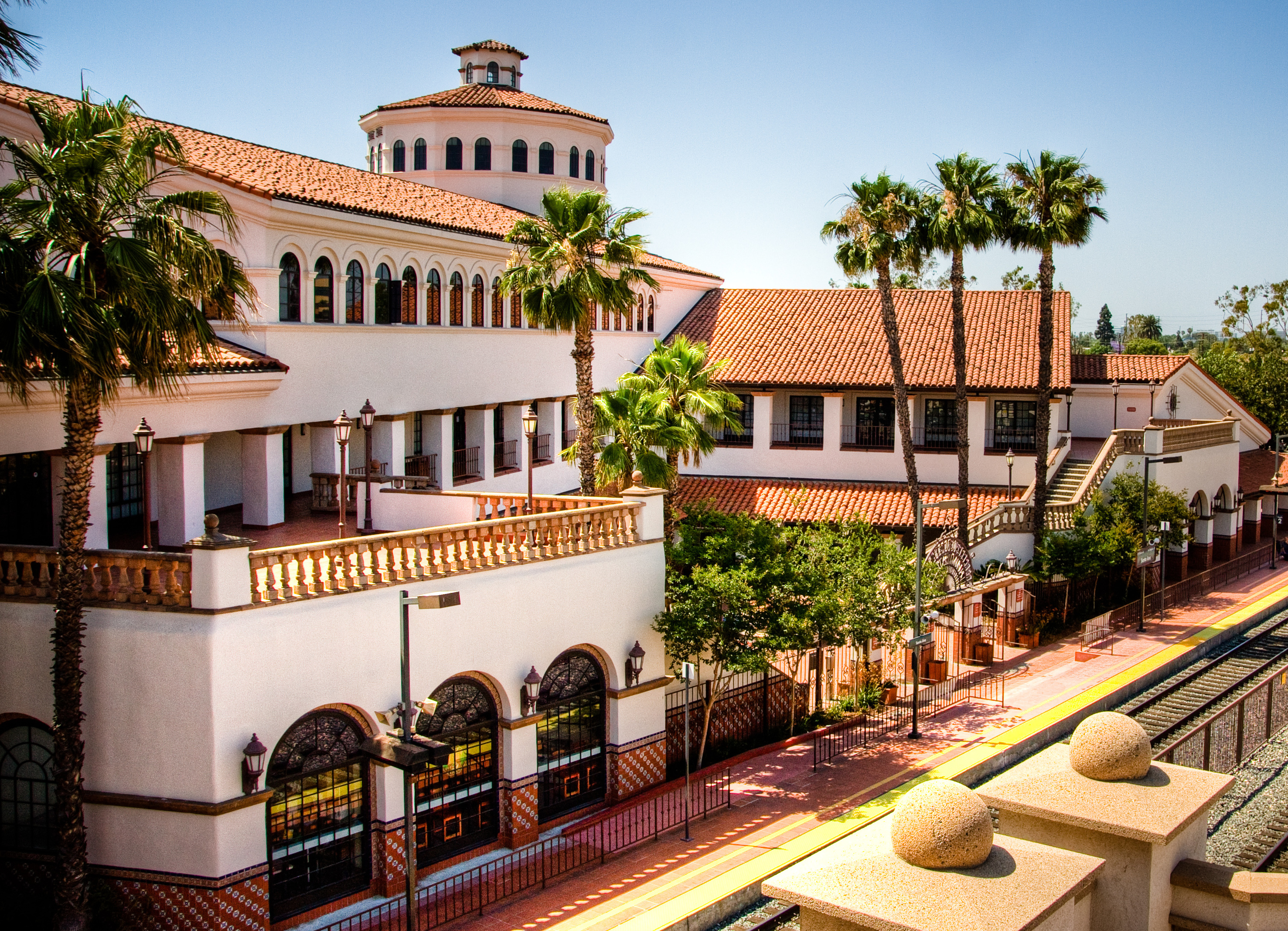
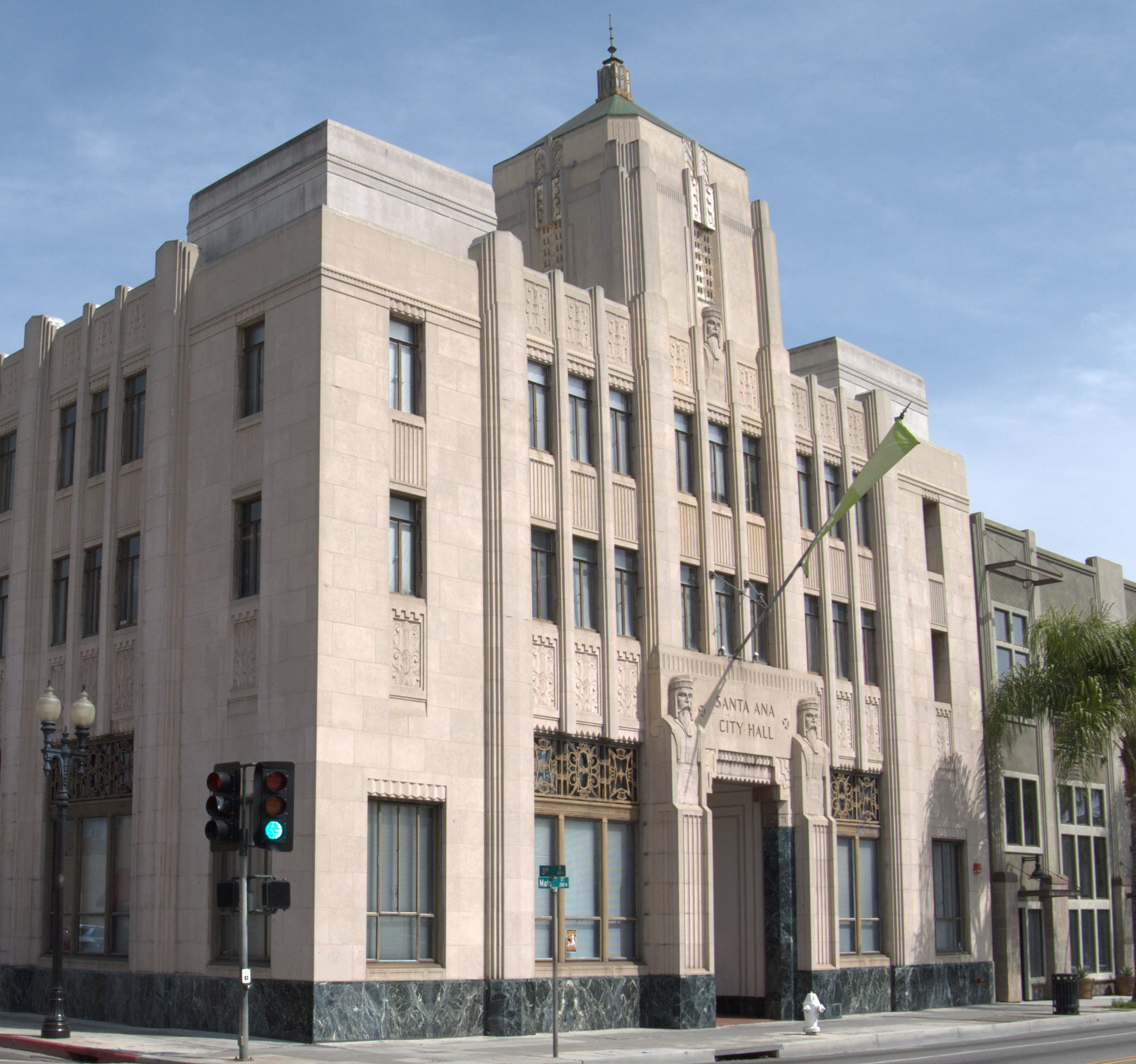
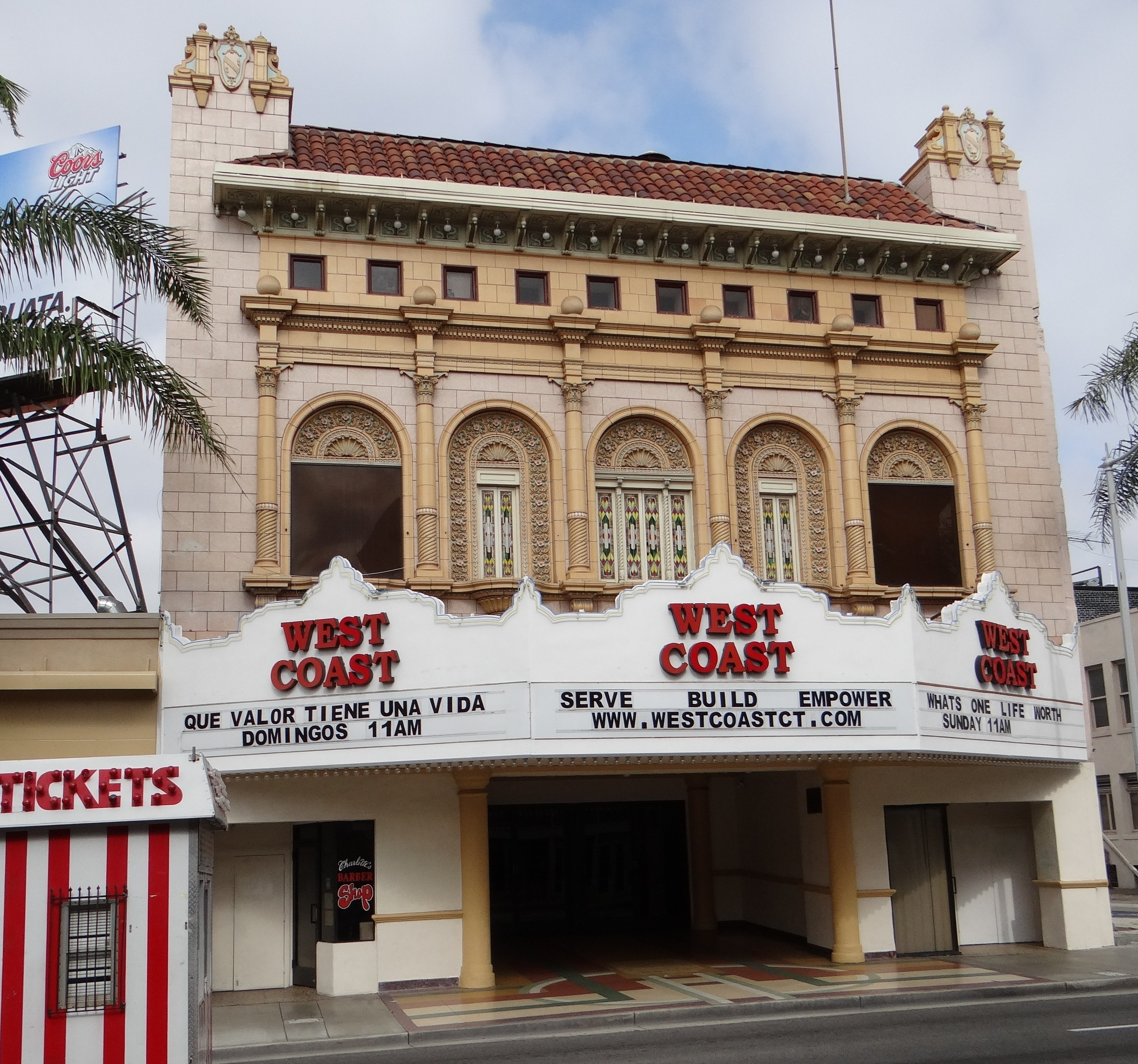
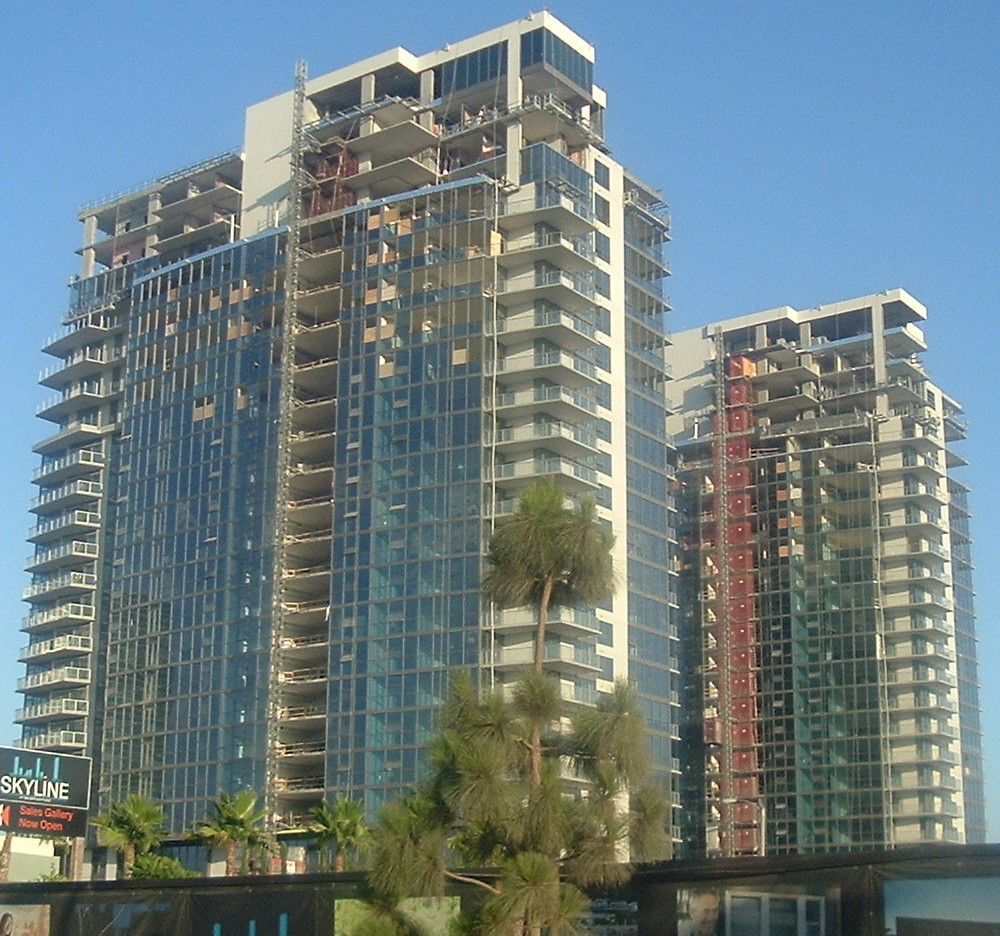
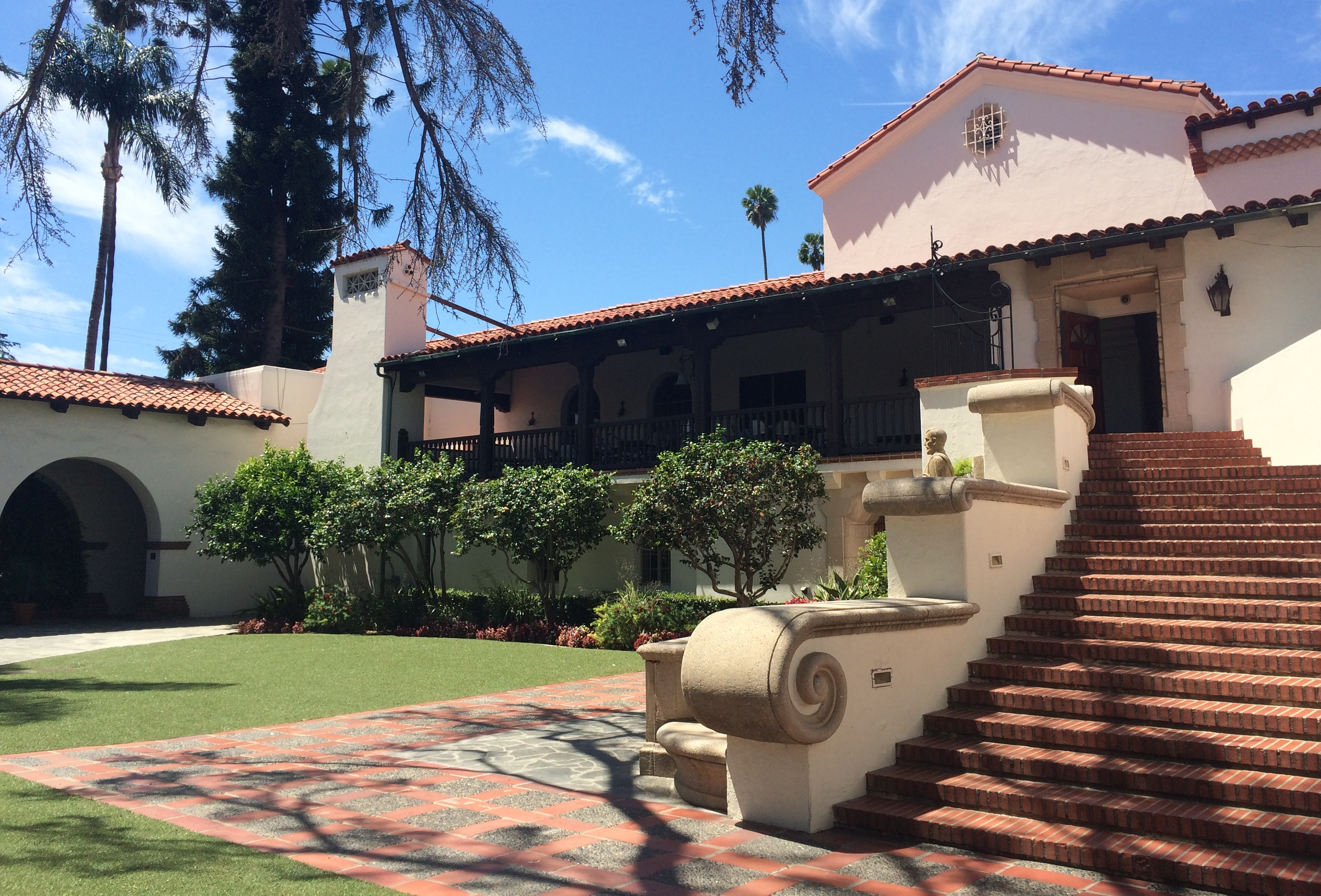
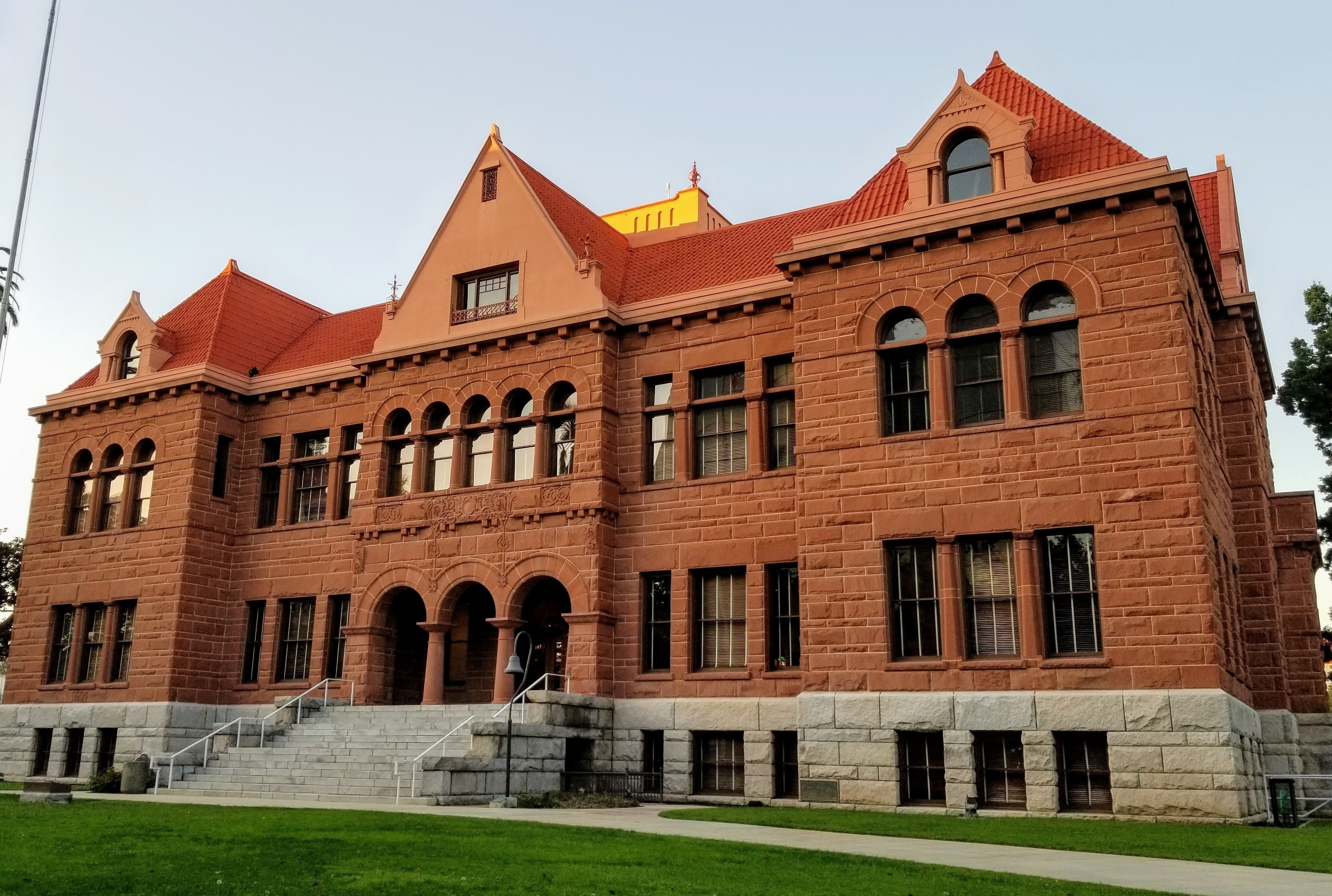
- Top: Santora Building (left) and Santa Ana Regional Transportation Center (right); middle: Santa Ana City Hall (left), West Coast Theatre (center), and high rises (right); bottom: Bowers Museum (left) and Old Santa Ana Courthouse

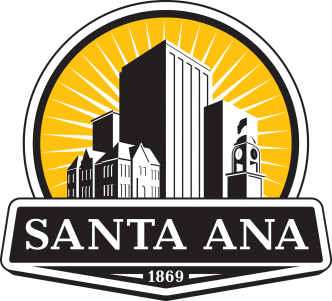
- Flag Seal Logo
- Motto: Education First
- Location of Santa Ana within Orange County, California

- Location in the Los Angeles Metropolitan Area Location in California Location in the United States Location in North America
- Coordinates: 33°44′27″N 117°52′53″W
- Country: United States
- State: California
- County: Orange
- Founded: 1869
- Incorporated: June 1, 1886
- Named for: Saint Anne

Area
  - Total: 27.37 sq mi (70.89 km^{2})
  - Land: 27.34 sq mi (70.81 km^{2})
  - Water: 0.031 sq mi (0.08 km^{2}) 0.90%
- Elevation: 115 ft (35 m)

Population (2020)
  - Total: 310,227
  - Rank: (2023); 3rd in Orange County; 14th in California; 65th in the United States
  - Density: 11,350/sq mi (4,381/km^{2})
- Time zone: UTC−8 (Pacific)
  - Summer (DST): UTC−7 (PDT)
- Website: santa-ana.org

The following outline is provided as an overview of and topical guide to English Wikipedia articles about the city of Santa Ana, California.

== About ==
Santa Ana is a city in southern California and the county seat of Orange County. Founded in 1869 and incorporated in 1886, it began as a small farming community. The arrival of the railroad helped it grow into a trade and transportation center. During the 20th century, the city expanded rapidly with the rise of industry, defense jobs, and suburban development. Today, Santa Ana is a major urban center with government offices, a historic downtown district, and diverse communities.

== Main pages ==
- Santa Ana, California
- Timeline of Santa Ana, California

== Structures and landmarks ==
- Builders Exchange Building – A Beaux Arts-style building constructed in 1929, originally serving as a center for the construction industry.
- Honer Plaza – One of Orange County's first shopping centers, opened in the 1950s, now known as Bristol Marketplace.
- Odd Fellows Hall (Santa Ana, California) – Built in 1906, this Beaux Arts-style building served as a clubhouse and commercial space for the Independent Order of Odd Fellows.
- Old Orange County Courthouse (California) – Opened in 1901, this Romanesque Revival building is the oldest courthouse in Southern California and now serves as a museum.
- Pacific Electric Sub-Station No. 14 – Constructed in 1907, this brick building was part of the Pacific Electric Railway system, converting electricity for streetcars in central Orange County.
- Rankin Building – A four-story building listed on the National Register of Historic Places, originally serving as a department store in downtown Santa Ana.
- Santa Ana Fire Station Headquarters No. 1 – Built in 1929, this Spanish Colonial Revival-style fire station is listed on the National Register of Historic Places.
- Santa Ana Water Tower – Constructed in 1928, this historic water tower is a recognizable symbol of the city and a designated landmark.
- Santora Building – A historic building in Santa Ana, known for its architectural significance and role in the city's development.
- Spurgeon Block – A historic commercial building in Santa Ana, contributing to the city's architectural heritage.
- Yost Theater-Ritz Hotel – A historic venue in Santa Ana, originally serving as a theater and later as a hotel, reflecting the city's cultural history.

== Government ==
For schools and districts, see the section below on education.

- Santa Ana City Hall and Civic Center
- Santa Ana City Council
- Santa Ana Police Department
- Orange County, California
  - Orange County Board of Supervisors
  - Orange County Sheriff's Department
  - Orange County Fire Authority
  - Orange County Superior Court
- South Coast Metro
- California's 34th State Senate district
- California's 46th congressional district
- California's 48th congressional district
- California's 72nd State Assembly district
- Mayoral elections in Santa Ana, California
- Ronald Reagan Federal Building and Courthouse (Santa Ana)
- United States District Court for the Central District of California

== Education and museums ==
- American Aviation Historical Society – A non-profit organization founded in 1956, dedicated to preserving and disseminating the history of American aviation through publications, archives, and educational programs.
- Bowers Museum – An art museum in Santa Ana, California, established in 1936, featuring collections in pre-Columbian Mesoamerica, Native American art, and the arts of Asia, Africa, and Oceania.
- Heritage Museum of Orange County – A 12-acre historical museum and events center in Santa Ana, California, dedicated to preserving, promoting, and restoring Orange County's nature, history, culture, and community.
- Orange County School of the Arts – A public charter school located in Santa Ana, California, offering a rigorous college-preparatory academic program alongside pre-professional arts training for students in grades 7–12.
- CSUF Grand Central Art Center – A contemporary art center in Santa Ana, California, operated by California State University, Fullerton, featuring exhibitions, artist residencies, and community engagement programs.
- Discovery Cube Orange County – An interactive science museum in Santa Ana, offering over 80 hands-on exhibits focused on STEM education for children and families.

=== Colleges and universities ===
- Rancho Santiago Community College District
- Taft Law School
- Veritas International University

=== Schools ===
- Santa Ana Unified School District
- Santa Ana Unified School District Intermediate Schools
- Century High School (Santa Ana, California)
- Chávez High School (Santa Ana, California)
- Godinez Fundamental High School
- Lorin Griset Academy
- Mater Dei High School (Santa Ana, California)
- Middle College High School (Santa Ana)
- Saddleback High School
- Santa Ana College (Note: Renamed in 1947 from Santa Ana Junior College, it was the first community college in Orange County; also known as Rancho Santiago College)
- Santa Ana High School
- Segerstrom High School
- Valley High School (Santa Ana, California)

== Churches ==
- Calvary Chapel Costa Mesa (Note: Calvary Chapel Costa Mesa is located at 3800 S. Fairview St., Santa Ana, CA 92704, it is not located in Costa Mesa.)
- Calvary Church of Santa Ana
- First Baptist Church of Santa Ana

== Transportation ==
- Santa Ana Line, a former interurban rail line that connected Santa Ana to Los Angeles, operated by Pacific Electric.
- Santa Ana Regional Transportation Center, a major rail and bus station serving Amtrak, Metrolink, and regional transit in central Santa Ana.
- OC Streetcar, a future streetcar line that will serve Santa Ana and utilize part of the former Santa Ana Line's right of way and connect to the Santa Ana Regional Transportation Center.

== Business ==
- Fairhaven Memorial Park, A historic cemetery in Santa Ana, established in 1911.
- Howe-Waffle House and Carriage House, A historic Victorian-era home and museum once owned by Dr. Willella Howe-Waffle, one of Orange County's first female physicians.
- MainPlace Mall, A major shopping center in Santa Ana featuring retail stores, dining, and entertainment.
- SchoolsFirst Federal Credit Union, A large credit union headquartered in Santa Ana, serving school employees across California.
- The Orange County Register (Note: The newspaper was founded as the Santa Ana Daily Register in 1905, renamed the Santa Ana Register in 1939, shortened to The Register in 1952, and became the Orange County Register in 1985.)

== Sports, recreation, and entertainment ==
- Frida Cinema, A nonprofit arthouse theater in downtown Santa Ana, screening independent, classic, and foreign films since 2014.
- Lay's Replay Field (Santa Ana), A sustainable mini soccer field at Cesar Chavez Campesino Park, built from recycled chip bags as part of Lay’s RePlay initiative.
- New Walker Theatre, A historic 1924 movie theater on Main Street, later known as the West Coast Theatre, listed on the National Register of Historic Places.
- Orange County Ramblers, A professional football team that played in the Continental Football League from 1967 to 1968, with home games in Santa Ana and Anaheim.
- Orange County Soccer Club, A professional soccer team founded in 2010, competing in the USL Championship and based in Irvine, California.
- Santa Ana Stadium, Also known as Eddie West Field, this 9,000-seat city-owned stadium hosts football and soccer events in downtown Santa Ana.
- Santa Ana Winds FC, A soccer club established in 2006, competing in the United Premier Soccer League.
- Santa Ana Zoo, A 20-acre zoo in Prentice Park, focusing on Central and South American animals, known for its extensive primate collection.
- New Walker Theatre
- West End Theater (Santa Ana), A historic theater on 4th Street, opened in 1915, which has operated under various names including the State and Guild theaters.
- Yost Theater, A historic venue in downtown Santa Ana, opened in 1913, now serving as a concert and event space after multiple renovations.

== Community events ==
- Horrible Imaginings Film Festival, An annual film festival established in 2009, showcasing horror, sci-fi, and fantasy films. Originally based in San Diego, it relocated to Santa Ana in 2018 and is held at The Frida Cinema.
- Impact Wrestling Unbreakable (2019), A professional wrestling event produced by Impact Wrestling, at the Esports Arena in Santa Ana.

== Geography ==
- Downtown Santa Ana, The central business district of Santa Ana, known for its historic architecture, cultural institutions, and government buildings.
- Rancho Santiago de Santa Ana, a large Spanish land grant in present-day Orange County, California, encompassing current area of Santa Ana.
  - Jose Antonio Yorba, The original land grant from which Santa Ana was founded, was given to Yorba in 1834.
  - Sepúlveda family of California, A prominent landowner who acquired the Rancho Santiago de Santa Ana in 1854.
- Southern California, A geographic and cultural region that includes Santa Ana.
- Santa Ana Valley, A lowland region in Orange County named after Rancho Santiago de Santa Ana.
- Santa Ana Canyon, a canyon near Santa Ana
- Santa Ana Freeway, a major freeway from Los Angeles to Santa Ana
- Santa Ana Mountains, a short mountain range near Santa Ana
- Santa Ana River, the largest river in Southern California, flows through Santa Ana
  - Santa Ana River Trail, a multi-use trail along the river

== Miscellaneous ==
- 2014 Santa Ana kidnapping accusation – A notable criminal case involving an alleged kidnapping in Santa Ana in 2014.
- Lopers 13 – A group or event associated with the number 13, linked to Santa Ana .
- Orange County Men's Central Jail escape – An incident involving an escape from the main men's jail facility in Orange County.
- Santa Ana Standard – A local newspaper or publication serving the Santa Ana community.
- Santa Ana Walnut Growers – An organization or historical group involved in walnut farming in the Santa Ana area.

== See also ==
- Outline of California
- Outline of the history of Los Angeles
- Bibliography of California history
