= Godínez =

Godínez may refer to:

- Godínez (surname), including a list of people with the name
- Godinez v. Moran, a 1993 U.S. Supreme Court decision on competency
- Godinez Fundamental High School, Santa Ana, California
- Godínez (El Chavo del Ocho), a Mexican sitcom character
