= Godínez (surname) =

Godínez is a Spanish surname. Notable people with the name include:

- Alejandría Godínez (born 1994), Mexican footballer
- Alexandra Godínez (born 2003), Mexican footballer
- Ana Godinez (born 1999), Canadian freestyle wrestler
- Braulio Godínez (born 1984), Mexican footballer
- Damaris Godínez (born 1999), Mexican footballer
- Elisa Godínez Gómez de Batista (1904–1993), First Lady of Cuba 1940–1944
- Felipe Godínez (1588–1637), Spanish dramatist
- Hector Godinez (1924–1999), Mexican-American postmaster and civil rights leader
- Henry Godinez (born 1958), Cuban-American actor, director, and professor of theatre
- Jesús Godínez (born 1997), Mexican footballer
- Juan Godínez (1517–1571), Spanish conquistador
- Karla Godinez, Canadian freestyle wrestler
- Loopy Godínez (born 1993), Mexican-Canadian mixed martial artist
- Manuel Godínez (born 1921), Cuban baseball pitcher in the Negro leagues
- Miguel Godínez, or Michael Wadding (1591–1644), Irish priest in Mexico
- Rodrigo Godínez (born 1992), Mexican footballer
- Said Godínez (disambiguation), multiple people
- Sergio Gerardo Ugalde Godínez (born 1971), Costa Rican jurist and international lawyer

== Fictional characters ==
- Godínez (El Chavo del Ocho), from the Mexican sitcom El Chavo del Ocho
