= Walker Theatre =

Walker Theatre or Walker Theater may refer to:

- The Madam Walker Legacy Center in Indianapolis, Indiana
- Burton Cummings Theatre in Winnipeg, Manitoba
- New Walker Theatre in Santa Ana, California
