= Santiago Canyon College =

Public community college in Orange, California, US

Coordinates: 33.7956°N 117.7663°W

Santiago Canyon College (SCC)
- Other name: SCC
- Motto: What Happens Here Matters
- Type: Public community college
- Established: 1985
- Parent institution: Rancho Santiago Community College District, California Community Colleges
- Chancellor: Marvin Martinez
- President: Jeannie G. Kim
- Students: 15,228 (fall 2022)
- Location: Orange, California, United States
- Campus: Suburban, 82 acres
- Colors: Blue and Gold
- Nickname: Hawks
- Website: www.sccollege.edu

Santiago Canyon College is a public community college in Orange, California. Along with Santa Ana College, Santiago Canyon College is one of two campuses in the Rancho Santiago Community College District (RSCCD).

== History ==
In 1980, The Irvine Company sold 30 acres of land to RSCCD. In 1985, RSCCD opened the school, which was simply called the Orange Campus at that time. Enrollment was approximately 2,500 students during the first semester of operation. In July 1997, the school separated from Santa Ana College and changed its name to Santiago Canyon College.

In January 2000, the college was independently accredited by the Accrediting Commission for Community and Junior Colleges. Later that year, The Irvine Company donated an additional 12 acres to the school. The school's footprint expanded again in April 2003 when RSCCD used funds from Measure E (passed in November 2002) to buy nearly 19 additional acres.

In September 2004, a Student Services and Instruction building was completed. In late 2006, the Library building opened. In January 2009, the softball complex opened. The Science Center opened for the Fall 2010 semester. In January 2013, the Athletics and Aquatics Complex opened. Later in 2013, the Humanities building opened for the fall 2013 semester.

== Campus ==
The library building earned a merit award from the American Institute of Architects' Committee on Architecture for Education. The library, which opened in 2006, is 40,000 square feet (3,700 m^{2}) and holds 100,000 books. It was designed by LPA Architecture.

== Academics ==
The school offers 65 associate degree programs.

== Athletics ==
The Hawks compete in the Orange Empire Conference and have a total of 8 sports. Sports in the Fall include Men's and Women's Cross Country, Men's and Women's Soccer and Women's Volleyball. Winter sports include Men's basketball. Spring sports include Softball and Men's Volleyball. In December 2009, the Hawks won the state title in women's soccer and were named Division III national champions by the National Soccer Coaches Association of America. In December 2018, the Hawks won their third State Title after having a perfect 24–0 season.

=== Men's and women's cross country ===
Cross Country is SCC's longest tenured sport having started in 2002. Over the years, this program has boasted a number of All-American, All-State, and All OEC selections.

=== Women's softball ===
In spring 2016, the Hawks won the California Community College Athletic Association state championship in women's softball.

=== Women's soccer ===
The Hawks won back-to-back state championships in 2018 and 2019.

=== Men's soccer ===
The men's soccer team had its inaugural season in 2004.

=== Men's volleyball ===
In spring 2017, Santiago debuted a men's volleyball team.

== Student body ==
Ethnic composition of student body
	Undergraduate	U.S. Census
Caucasian	24.4%	73.9%
Black	2.5%	12.1%
Asian	9.7%	4.3%
Hispanic	56.4%	14.5%
Other/Unreported	6.7%	6.2%
Native American	0.3%	0.9%

In 2014, Santiago Canyon College had a total undergraduate population of 13,613. 36% of the student population was part-time. 51% of the student body was male and 49% was female.
