= Hebron Fangupo =

American football player and coach (born 1985)

New Mexico Lobos
- Title: Defensive line coach

Personal information
- Born: July 19, 1985 (age 41); Santa Ana, California, U.S.
- Listed height: 6 ft 1 in (1.85 m)
- Listed weight: 330 lb (150 kg)

Career information
- High school: Century (Santa Ana)
- College: BYU
- NFL draft: 2012: undrafted

Career history

Playing
- Houston Texans (2012)*; Seattle Seahawks (2012); Pittsburgh Steelers (2012–2013); Kansas City Chiefs (2014)*; Washington Redskins (2014)*; Kansas City Chiefs (2014–2015)*
- * Offseason or practice squad member only

Coaching
- Snow (2017–2018) Defensive line coach; Dixie State / Utah Tech (2019–2022) Defensive line coach; Texas Southern (2023) Defensive analyst; Idaho (2024) Defensive line coach; New Mexico (2025–present) Defensive line coach

Career NFL statistics
- Total tackles: 1
- Stats at Pro Football Reference

Hebron "Loni" Fangupo (born July 19, 1985) is an American former professional football player who was a nose tackle in the National Football League (NFL). He signed with the Houston Texans after going unselected in the 2012 NFL draft. He played college football for the BYU Cougars after he served a two-year Mormon mission in Philippines. Prior to BYU, he attended Mt. San Antonio College and Southern California.

He has been a member of the Kansas City Chiefs, Houston Texans, Seattle Seahawks, Pittsburgh Steelers, and Washington Redskins.

== Biography ==
Fangupo is the grandson of the businessman and former Minister of Health of Tonga, 'Uliti Uata.

== Professional career ==
=== Seattle Seahawks ===
Fangupo was signed to the Seattle Seahawks practice squad on September 12, 2012 after spending training camp with the Houston Texans. Fangupo was signed to the active roster on December 20, 2012 before being cut. On December 29, 2012, he was signed to the Pittsburgh Steelers in time for their final game of the season against the Cleveland Browns.

=== Kansas City Chiefs (first stint) ===
Fangupo was signed to the Kansas City Chiefs practice squad on September 1, 2014.

=== Washington Redskins ===
Fangupo was signed to the practice squad of the Washington Redskins on September 16, 2014. He was released by the team on September 30, 2014.

=== Kansas City Chiefs (second stint) ===
Fangupo was signed to the Kansas City Chiefs practice squad on November 5, 2014. On December 31, he signed a futures contract with the Chiefs. On May 15, 2015, Fangupo was waived by the Chiefs. On August 1, 2015, he was re-signed by the Chiefs. On September 5, 2015, Fangupo was waived by the Chiefs and was re-signed to the practice squad. On November 17, 2015, Fangupo was released from the practice squad.

=== Coaching career ===
In 2017, Fangupo he became the defensive line coach at Snow College in Ephraim, Utah. In 2019, he moved to Utah Tech University (formerly Dixie State University) in the same position. He spent the 2023 season as a defensive analyst at Texas Southern University. On March 25, 2024, Fangupo was hired as the defensive line coach at the University of Idaho. He was recently hired as defensive line coach at the University of New Mexico.
