= Quinton Bell =

American football player (born 1996)

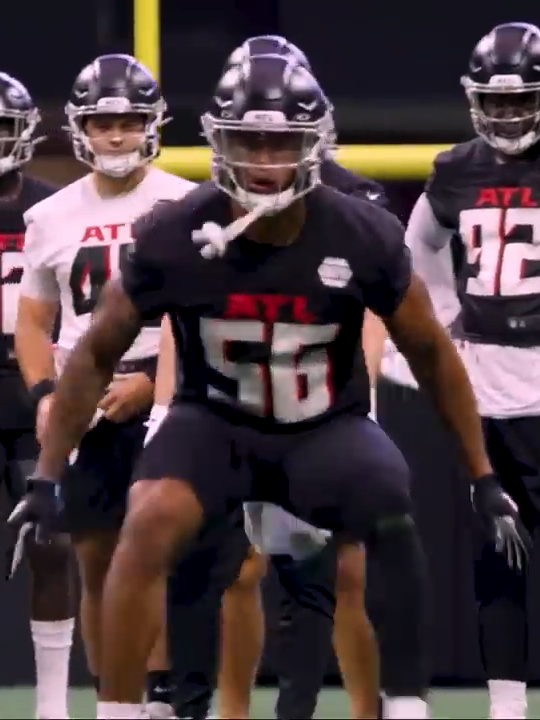
- Bell with the Atlanta Falcons in 2022

No. 43 – New York Jets
- Position: Linebacker
- Roster status: Practice squad

Personal information
- Born: May 9, 1996 (age 30); Long Beach, California, U.S.
- Listed height: 6 ft 4 in (1.93 m)
- Listed weight: 258 lb (117 kg)

Career information
- High school: Costa Mesa (Costa Mesa, California)
- College: Prairie View A&M (2015–2018)
- NFL draft: 2019: 7th round, 230th overall pick

Career history
- Oakland Raiders (2019)*; Tampa Bay Buccaneers (2019–2020); Atlanta Falcons (2021–2022); Philadelphia Eagles (2023)*; Miami Dolphins (2023–2025); San Francisco 49ers (2026)*; New York Jets (2026–present)
- * Offseason or practice squad member only

Awards and highlights
- Super Bowl champion (LV)

Career NFL statistics as of 2025
- Total tackles: 38
- Sacks: 1.0
- Pass deflections: 1
- Forced fumbles: 1
- Fumble recoveries: 1
- Stats at Pro Football Reference

Quinton Bell (born May 9, 1996) is an American professional football linebacker for the New York Jets of the National Football League (NFL). He played college football for the Prairie View A&M Panthers.

== Early life ==
Bell was born and raised in Long Beach, California. He attended high school in Costa Mesa where he was a three-sport athlete. Standing 6 ft 4 in (1.93 m) and weighing 210 pounds (95 kg), Bell's time in varsity sports included a year spent playing basketball and a year competing in track and field. In track and field, Bell won the Orange Coast League Championship in the 100 meter running event. He also set a new league record in the 4 x 100 League Championship.

In football, Bell played wide receiver and outside linebacker with the Costa Mesa Mustangs. During the 2013 season, Bell earned 1st Team All-Area, All-Region, All-Conference and All-County honors. In that same season, Bell and the Mustangs earned Sectional and Conference honors. Bell graduated in 2014 and accepted a collegiate sports offer from Prairie View A&M University.

== College career ==
Bell enrolled at Prairie View A&M in 2015. He played as a wide receiver alongside the Prairie View Panthers for three seasons from 2015 to 2017. He also competed in track and field during the 2017 season. Bell played his final season of football in 2018 as a defensive end. He went on to make HBCU history by becoming the first NFL draft pick from Prairie View since 1980.

== Professional career ==
Pre-draft measurables
Height	Weight	40-yard dash	Three-cone drill	Vertical jump	Broad jump	Bench press
6 ft 3 3/8 in (1.91 m)	238 lb (108 kg)	4.53 s	7.25 s	41.0 in (1.04 m)	11 ft 4 in (3.45 m)	23 reps
All values from Pro Day

=== Oakland Raiders ===
Bell was selected by the Oakland Raiders in the seventh round with the 230th overall pick in the 2019 NFL draft. He was waived on August 31, 2019, and re-signed to the practice squad. He was released on October 15.

=== Tampa Bay Buccaneers ===
On November 5, 2019, Bell was signed to the Tampa Bay Buccaneers practice squad. He signed a reserve/future contract with the Buccaneers on December 30, 2019.

Bell was waived by the Buccaneers on October 26, 2020, and re-signed to the practice squad two days later.

On February 9, 2021, Bell re-signed with the Buccaneers. He was waived on August 22, 2021.

=== Atlanta Falcons ===
On September 1, 2021, Bell was signed to the Atlanta Falcons practice squad. He signed a reserve/future contract with the Falcons on January 10, 2022.

Bell made the Falcons roster in 2022, playing three games before being waived on November 5, 2022, and re-signed to the practice squad. He signed a reserve/future contract on January 9, 2023. He was waived on April 14, 2023.

=== Philadelphia Eagles ===
Bell was signed by the Philadelphia Eagles on August 19, 2023. He was released by the Eagles as part of final roster cuts on August 29.

=== Miami Dolphins ===
On October 17, 2023, Bell was signed to the Miami Dolphins' practice squad. He signed a reserve/future contract with Miami on January 15, 2024.

On May 12, 2025, Bell re-signed with the Dolphins. He was released on August 26 as part of final roster cuts and re-signed to the practice squad the next day. Bell was promoted to the active roster on December 15.

=== San Francisco 49ers ===
On July 29, 2026, Bell signed a one-year contract with the San Francisco 49ers. On August 30, he was released by San Francisco as a part of final roster cuts.

=== New York Jets ===
On October 13, 2026, Bell signed with the New York Jets practice squad.

== Personal life ==
Bell's uncle is Nick Bell. Bell and his fiancée, Brooke Miranda, have two children together and in October 2025 announced they were having a third.
