= Estancia High School (California) =

Location
- 2323 Placentia Avenue; Costa Mesa, Orange, California 92627; United States; 33°39′32″N 117°56′09″W

Information
- Established: 1965
- School district: Newport-Mesa Unified School District
- Superintendent: Fred Navarro
- Principal: Michael Halt
- Teaching staff: 52.63 (FTE)
- Grades: 9-12
- Student to teacher ratio: 18.54
- Colors: Cardinal red and gold
- Athletics conference: Orange Coast League; CIF Southern Section
- Team name: Eagles
- Rival: Costa Mesa High School
- Newspaper: El Talon
- Feeder schools: TeWinkle Middle School
- Website: estancia.nmusd.us

Estancia High School is located in Costa Mesa, California and is part of the Newport-Mesa Unified School District which serves approximately 21,000 students who reside in the cities of Newport Beach and Costa Mesa. Estancia High School is a comprehensive high school which serves the needs of approximately 975 students in Grades 9-12.

== Academics ==
Estancia High School offers a college prep curriculum. Currently, fourteen Advanced Placement courses are being offered. In fall 2015, Estancia High School launched an Engineering & Design Signature Academy for students entering Grade 9.

=== Engineering Design Signature Academy ===
Estancia's Engineering Design pathway employs Project Lead the Way curriculum with a focus on Advanced Manufacturing. Students progress through a 4 course pathway:

1. Introduction to Engineering Design (Freshmen)
2. Principles of Engineering
3. Computer Integrated Manufacturing
4. Engineering Design Development (Senior/Capstone)

== Athletics ==
Estancia is part of the Orange Coast League of the CIF Southern Section, part of the California Interscholastic Federation.

The school offers varsity teams in: Football, Boys and Girls Volleyball, Cheerleading, Boys and Girls Waterpolo, Boys and Girls Tennis, Boys and Girls Cross Country, Boys and Girls Track & field, Boys and Girls Basketball, Boys and Girls Soccer, Coed Wrestling, Boys and Girls Golf, Girls Softball, and Baseball.

Fall Sports

- Football
- Girls' Volleyball
- Boys' Water Polo
- Girls' Tennis
- Girls' Golf
- Coed Cross Country

Winter Sports

- Boys' & Girls' Basketball
- Boys' & Girls' Soccer
- Girls' Water Polo
- Coed Wrestling

Spring Sports

- Boys' Baseball
- Girls' Softball
- Boys' Volleyball
- Boys' Golf
- Coed Swimming
- Coed Track & Field
- Boys’ Tennis

Estancia High School's rival is Costa Mesa High School. Each sport plays Costa Mesa High School in the annual Battle of the Bell. The winner of the Battle of the Bell houses the "bell" for the school year. Estancia High School currently houses the bells for football, boys' basketball and girls' basketball. Estancia High School has also been in the recipient of the All Sports Trophy sponsored by Newport Rib Company for the past six school years.

== Notable alumni ==
- Rich Amaral, Former Major League Baseball player (Seattle Mariners, Baltimore Orioles)
- Rony Argueta, Professional soccer player
- Matt Fuerbringer, Professional Beach Volleyball player, Class of 1992
- Jeff Gardner, Former Major League Baseball player (New York Mets, San Diego Padres, Montreal Expos)
- Jeff Graham, gridiron football player
- Mitchell Hurwitz, creator of the television show Arrested Development. Graduated in 1981.
- Tom Jancar, contemporary art dealer Jancar Kuhlenschmidt Gallery
- Spencer Kayden, Actress
- Jake Knapp, professional golfer who joined the PGA Tour in 2024. Graduated in 2012.
- Ron Kravette, US National Ice Dance Champion. Graduated in 1981.
- Allan Mansoor, Assemblymember representing the 74th Assembly District and former mayor of Costa Mesa
