= Jeff Graham (quarterback) =

American football player (born 1966)

Profile
- Position: Quarterback

Personal information
- Born: February 5, 1966 (age 60)
- Listed height: 6 ft 5 in (1.96 m)
- Listed weight: 220 lb (100 kg)

Career information
- High school: Estancia (Costa Mesa, California)
- College: Long Beach State
- NFL draft: 1989: 4th round, 87th overall pick

Career history
- Washington Redskins (1989)*; Cleveland Browns (1989–1990); New York/New Jersey Knights (1991); San Diego Chargers (1991); Indianapolis Colts (1992)*; Seattle Seahawks (1992)*; Atlanta Falcons (1992)*; Seattle Seahawks (1992–1994); Oakland Raiders (1995)
- * Offseason or practice squad member only

Jeff Graham (born February 5, 1966) is an American former professional football player who was a quarterback for five seasons in the National Football League (NFL) with the San Diego Chargers, Seattle Seahawks, and Oakland Raiders. He was selected by the Green Bay Packers in the fourth round of the 1989 NFL draft. He played college football for the Long Beach State 49ers and attended Estancia High School in Costa Mesa, California. Graham was also a member of the New York/New Jersey Knights of the World League of American Football (WLAF). He was inducted into the Long Beach State Athletic Hall of Fame in 2004.

== Professional career ==
=== Green Bay Packers ===
Graham was drafted in the fourth round with the 87th overall pick in the 1989 NFL Draft by the Green Bay Packers. He was the sixth quarterback taken in the draft and the second quarterback taken by the Packers in the draft as Anthony Dilweg was drafted in the previous round. Graham was traded on draft day to the Washington Redskins for wide receiver Erik Affholter and two draft picks.

=== Washington Redskins ===
Graham entered the Washington Redskins' training camp to battle out Stan Humphries for the 3rd string quarterback position behind Doug Williams and Mark Rypien. He was waived on August 30.

=== Cleveland Browns ===
Graham was picked up by the Cleveland Browns and assigned to their developmental squad for the 1989 season. Graham resigned for the 1990 season however a rotator cuff injury placed him on injured reserve for the season.

=== New York/New Jersey Knights WLAF ===
Graham's greatest professional success came as starting quarterback of the World League of American Football New York/New Jersey Knights where he started 9 of 10 games played and threw for 2407 yards completing 157 of 272 attempts with eight touchdowns and eight interceptions. He added 140 yards rushing on 24 carries and led the Knights into the playoffs where they lost to the eventual league champion London Monarchs. Graham posted World League postseason record of 399 yards including two touchdowns in the 42-26 loss.

=== San Diego Chargers ===
For the 1991 season, Graham was signed to the San Diego Chargers' practice squad following a tour of duty with the WLAF. Graham was promoted to the 47 man roster December 1 after an injury to starting quarterback John Friesz. The 1992 season gave Graham an opportunity to compete for the starting position with Friesz and Pat O'Hara, but in the end, Graham was let go in August cut downs.

=== Indianapolis Colts ===
Graham was briefly picked up by the Indianapolis Colts on September 17, 1992 following his release from the Chargers. He spent a little over a week with the practice squad before being waived from the squad on September 24.

=== Seattle Seahawks ===
On October 15, 1992 Graham was picked up by the Seattle Seahawks and assigned to the practice squad. He was released from the practice squad on November 4.

=== Atlanta Falcons ===
Following his release from the Seahawks practice squad the Atlanta Falcons signed Graham to their practice squad November 18, 1992, he was subsequently picked up by Seattle and signed to their active roster.

=== Seattle Seahawks (second stint) ===
On December 17, 1992 Graham returned to the Seahawks after the retirement of Rusty Hilger and Graham was the Seahawks 3rd string quarterback behind Stan Gelbaugh and Kelly Stouffer. Graham was on and off with the Seahawks through the 1994 season bouncing between the practice squad and inactive roster.

=== Oakland Raiders ===
Graham's last year in the NFL came with the Oakland Raiders for the 1995 season. Once Jeff Hostetler was placed on injured reserve in December Graham was promoted to the third-string quarterback position. He was not retained for the 1996 season
