= Orange Coast League =

High school athletic league in California

The Orange Coast League is a high school athletic league that is part of the CIF Southern Section.

== Members ==
- Calvary Chapel High School
- Costa Mesa High School
- Estancia High School
- Santa Ana High School
- Orange High School
- Saddleback High School
- St. Margaret's Episcopal School
