= Bob Ernst =

American rowing coach

Biographical details
- Education: UC Irvine

Playing career

Football, swimming, water polo
- 1964–1965: Orange Coast College

Swimming, water polo, rowing
- 1966–1967: UC Irvine

Coaching career (HC unless noted)

College rowing
- ?–1974: UC Irvine
- 1974–1980: Washington (freshman)
- 1980–1987: Washington (women's)
- 1987–2007: Washington (men's)
- 2007–2015: Washington (women's)

U.S. women's Olympic team
- 1976: Women's double
- 1980: Women's sculls
- 1984: Women's eight
- 1988: Women's eight

Accomplishments and honors

Awards
- Pac-10 Women's coach of the Year (1987); 10x Pac-10 Men's Coach of the Year (1990–1993, 1995–1997, 2003, 2004, 2007); UC Irvine Hall of Fame (1984); National Rowing Foundation Hall of Fame (1994); CRCA Hall of Fame (2015)
Medal record
Head coach for United States
Women's rowing
Olympic Games
Gold medal – first place	1984 Los Angeles	Women's eight

Bob Ernst is a former rowing coach. He served as both the men's and women's rowing coach at the University of Washington during a 42-year association with the school. He was a four-time coach of U.S. Olympic women's rowing teams, from 1976 to 1988.

== Early life and college ==
Ernst graduated from Costa Mesa High School in 1963. He then attended Orange Coast College where he was active in sports, playing center on the 1963 national champion junior college football team as well as the swimming and water polo. He then transferred to UC Irvine, where he again competed in both swimming and water polo, while adding rowing – becoming captain as a senior. Ernst graduated from UC Irvine in 1967. He would go on to earn a master's degree in sports administration from the University of Washington in 1979.

== Coaching ==
=== College ===
Ernst began his coaching career in rowing at UC Irvine. A near-upset of Washington in 1974 led to a job coaching the Washington freshman team, a role which held from 1974 to 1980.

Ernst was then promoted to head the Washington women's team from 1980 to 1987. After the retirement of Dick Erickson, he led the Washington men's team from 1987 to 2007, capturing national championships in 1997 and 2007. The following season, Ernst returned to lead the women's team, a role he held from 2007 to 2015.

=== Olympics ===
Enrst is a four-time coach of the U.S. women's Olympic team. He led the women's double in 1976, women's sculls in 1980, and the women's eight in both 1984 and 1988. His 1980 team did not compete in the Olympics due to the 1980 Summer Olympics boycott, while the 1984 team won the gold medal.

== Awards ==
Ernst was an eleven-time Pacific-10 Conference Coach of the Year, Women's Coach of the Year in 1987 and Men's Coach of the Year in 1990–1993, 1995–1997, 2003, 2004, and 2007. He was inducted into UC Irvine's athletic Hall of Fame in 1984, the National Rowing Foundation Hall of Fame in 1994, and the Collegiate Rowing Coaches Association (CRCA) Hall of Fame in 2015.

== Personal life ==
Ernst is married with two children.
