= Newport-Mesa Unified School District =

California school district serving Costa Mesa and Newport Beach

Address
- 2985 Bear Street Costa Mesa, California; United States

District information
- Type: Public
- Grades: Preschool-12
- Established: 1966
- Superintendent: Dr. Wesley Smith
- NCES District ID: 0627240

Students and staff
- Students: 18,559 (2020–2021)
- Teachers: 855.71 (FTE)
- Staff: 1,397.24 (FTE)
- Student–teacher ratio: 21.69:1

Other information
- Website: web.nmusd.us

Newport-Mesa Unified School District is a school district in Orange County, California, United States, that mainly serves the cities of Newport Beach and Costa Mesa. The district was founded on July 1, 1966. It currently serves approximately 18,600 at twenty-two elementary schools, two intermediate schools, four high schools, one alternative education center, and one adult education center.

== Governance ==
Newport-Mesa is governed by a seven-member Board of Education, each of whom serve four-year terms. Board Members are elected by geographic district. Current Board Members include:

Position	Board Member	Trustee Area	Term Began	Term ends
President	Leah Ersoylu	1	2024	2028
Vice President	Michelle Murphy	2	2022	2026
Clerk	Lisa Pearson	4	2022	2026
Trustee	Andrea McElroy	5	July 2025 (partial term)	2026
Trustee	Ashley Anderson	7	2022	2026
Trustee	Carol Crane	3	2024	2028
Trustee	Krista Weigand	6	2024	2028

== Schools ==
=== Preschool ===
- Adams Preschool
- College Park Preschool
- Davis Magnet Preschool
- Harbor View Preschool
- Harper Preschool
- Killybrooke Preschool
- Mariners Preschool
- Newport Coast Preschool
- Newport Preschool
- Paularino Preschool
- Pomona Preschool
- Pomona Year Round Preschool
- Rea Preschool
- Sonora Preschool
- Victoria Preschool
- Whittier Preschool
- Whittier Year Round Preschool
- Wilson Preschool
- Woodland Preschool

=== Elementary schools ===
- Adams
- Andersen
- California
- College Park
- Davis
- Eastbluff
- Harbor View
- Kaiser
- Killybrooke
- Lincoln
- Mariners
- Newport El
- Newport Coast
- Newport Heights
- Paularino
- Pomona
- Rea
- Sonora
- Victoria
- Whittier
- Wilson
- Woodland

=== Intermediate schools ===
- Ensign Intermediate School
- Corona Del Mar Middle School
- Costa Mesa Middle School
- TeWinkle Middle School

=== High schools ===
- Newport Harbor High School
- Costa Mesa High School
- Early College High School
- Estancia High School
- Corona del Mar High School

=== Alternative Education Centers ===
- Back Bay
- Monte Vista
- Cloud Campus

== See also ==
- List of school districts in Orange County, California
