= St. Margaret's Episcopal School =

School in San Juan Capistrano, California, US

Location
- 31641 La Novia; San Juan Capistrano, CA; United States; 33°30′15.2136″N 117°39′0.6366″W

Information
- Type: Private College Prep Academy
- Established: 1979
- Founder: Rev. Ernest Sillers
- Headmaster: Jeneen Graham
- Grades: PreK-12
- Gender: co-ed
- Color
- Nickname: Tartans
- Accreditation: WASC, CAIS (2018)
- Website: www.smes.org

St. Margaret's Episcopal School (SMES) is the oldest independent, coeducational, college preparatory school in Orange County, California. Located in historic San Juan Capistrano, the school enrolls 1,234 students from early childhood through grade 12. It is a member of the National Association of Episcopal Schools (NAES), the National Association for the Education of Young Children, the National Association of Independent Schools (NAIS), the Western States Association of Schools and Colleges (WASC), and the California Association of Independent Schools (CAIS).

== History ==
St. Margaret's was founded in 1979 by the Reverend Canon Ernest Sillers. The school began with only 79 students in kindergarten through grade six. It was named in honor of the 11th-century Queen Margaret of Scotland, the patron saint of education. The significance of this name is reflected in many St. Margaret's traditions, such as the use of bagpipes in formal ceremonies, along with their athletic team nickname, the Tartans.

St. Margaret's opened an Early Childhood Development Center in 1981 and its high school in 1982. By 1985, students were enrolled in grade levels preschool through 12.

In 1986, St. Margaret's brought in Markham B. Campaigne as its second headmaster. During his 17-year tenure, St. Margaret's grew to serve over 1,200 students and expanded to a 20-acre (81,000 m^{2}) campus. It is now included in Princeton Review's top 444 private schools in the United States book.

In 2004, Marcus Hurlbut became the new Headmaster of SMES. In 2013, William Moseley became headmaster. Dr. Jeneen Graham became the next Head of School on July 1, 2023.

== Academics ==
St. Margaret's offers courses in core subjects, as well as other subjects through electives. Theater, art, music, and other electives are available to be taken in addition to the core curriculum. There are 35 Advanced Placement or Post-AP courses offered in history, math, science, art, languages, theatre, music, and many other subjects. In addition to Advanced Placement (AP) courses, St. Margaret's offers 27 honors courses covering various subjects. The variety of courses gives students the opportunity to excel to the best of their ability. As of 2026, the school is ranked as the #1 Christian school in Greater Los Angeles.

== Athletics ==
St. Margaret's sports teams are called the Tartans, and they compete as members of the Pacific Coast League in the CIF Southern Section.

== Campus ==
In 2007, St. Margaret's completed construction on the DeYoung Family Math and Science Center. In 2011, St. Margaret's constructed a performing arts center, which includes the Hurlbut Theater and houses the music, dance, and theatre departments. A new middle school was constructed in 2015. The campus covers a span of 22 acres.

St. Margaret's has 2 gyms: the Campaigne Center, used by lower schoolers, and the Pasternack Field House, used by middle and upper schoolers. The Pasternack Field House was completed in 2007. There is a middle school field and a main football field, used by members of the high school. In 2026, a new student commons opened, featuring a dining hall, cafe, student loft, meeting spaces, and an athletic center. The athletic center includes a weight room, sports medicine clinic, film lab, fitness studios, and a golf simulator.
