= Felipe Godínez =

Felipe Godínez (1588–1637) was a dramatist of the Spanish Golden Age.

Felipe Godínez was born into a Portuguese Jewish family. His father was Méndez Duarte Godinez and his mother's name was Mary Denis Manrique. Felipe was the youngest of seven children.

== Education ==
Felipe pursued his higher education in Seville. In 1610, he graduated with a Bachelor of Theology degree from the Colegio Mayor de Santa Maria de Jesus of Seville. He also immersed himself in ecclesiastical studies.

== Works ==
Felipe's literary career began in 1604 with the publication of his book Mercurius Trismegistus. In 1610 Godínez published another poetry collection, entitled Gloss. The poem was marked by Jesuit philosophy, one of the dominant themes of his plays. This showed the importance of religious content in his plays. In later years of his career Godínez assumed the role of writer of divine comedies.

== Final Years ==
Godínez petered out toward the last twenty years of his life. He had stopped writing plays by then, and his only works during this period were a few poems. He died on December 3, 1659, at his Madrid home. He was buried in the church of San Justo y Pastor.

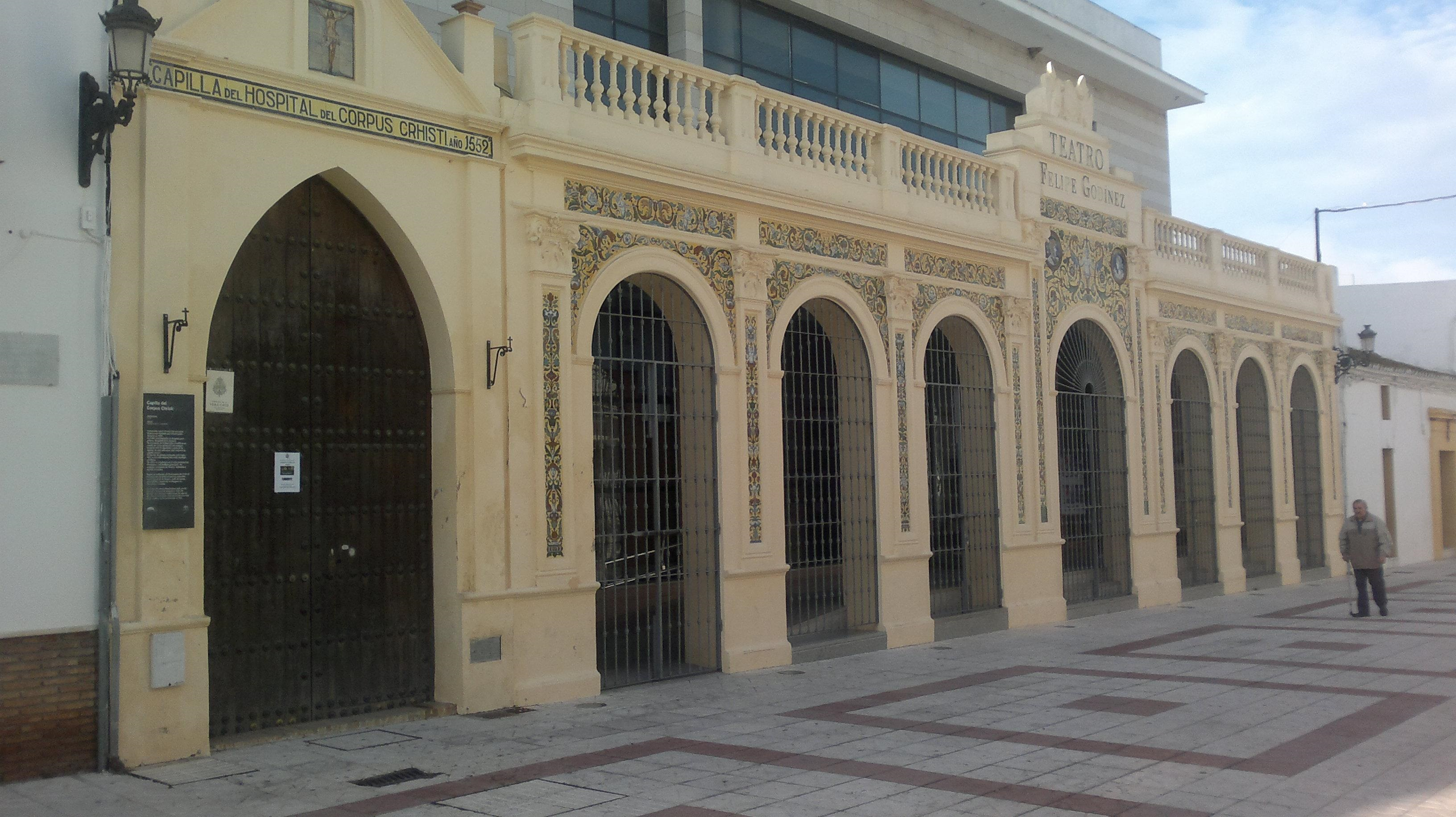
A theater in Spain named after Felipe Godínez.
