= Hector Godinez =

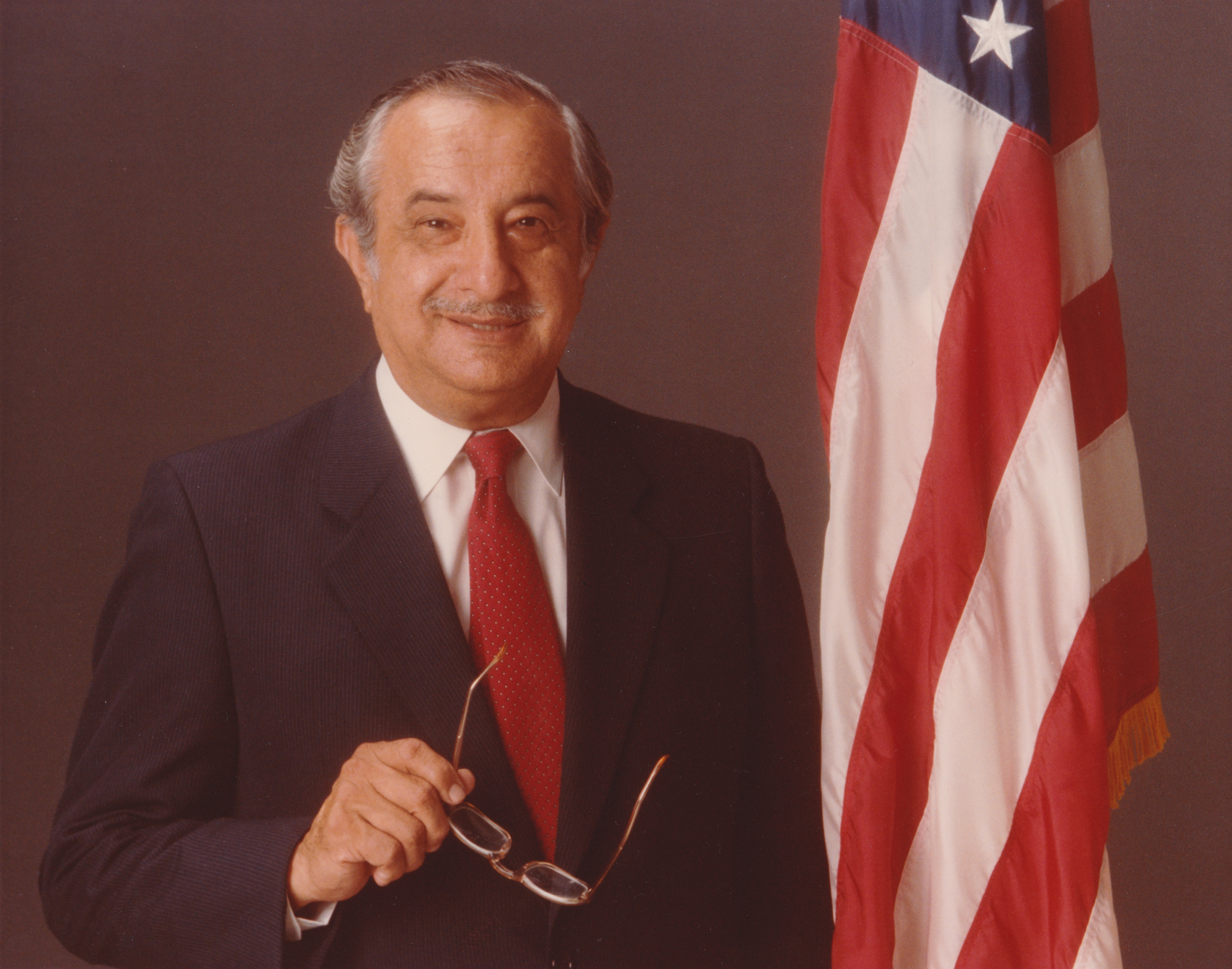
- Hector Godinez
- Born: Hector García Godinez; July 1, 1924; San Diego, California, U.S.
- Died: May 16, 1999 (aged 74)
- Resting place: Santa Ana Cemetery, Santa Ana, California, U.S
- Occupation: Postmaster
- Spouse: Mary Godinez (m. 1946)
- Children: 4 children
- Military career
- Allegiance: United States of America
- Branch: United States Army
- Conflicts: World War II
- Awards: One Purple Heart; One Bronze Star; Five Battle Stars

Hector G. Godinez (July 1, 1924 – May 16, 1999) was a civil rights leader and the first Mexican-American postmaster in the United States. He was appointed by President John F. Kennedy as postmaster of Santa Ana in 1961. He was subsequently promoted to Southern California district manager for the U.S. Postal Service, where he managed more than 44,000 employees and had an operating budget of $750 million.

During World War II, Godinez served under General George Patton in the United States Army as a Tank Commander in the Third Army. After being wounded, Godinez was honorably discharged and returned home in 1945 as a decorated war hero with five battle stars, one Purple Heart, and one Bronze Star for heroic achievement at the Battle of the Bulge. In 1946, Godinez began his 48-year career with the U.S. Postal Service, starting as a letter carrier and working his way up to a top leadership position.

Mr. Godinez was a founder of the League of Latin American Citizens, a group dedicated to improving conditions for Americans of Mexican descent. Godinez was a key figure in ending discrimination against Mexican American children in Orange County schools. Specifically, Godinez and other activists were responsible for Mendez v. Westminster—a landmark lawsuit that took on the establishment in Orange County so that schools would not be segregated. Because of this lawsuit, California desegregated its schools 6 years before the rest of the Nation. On the national level, Mendez v. Westminster was the basis for Brown v. Board of Education.

== Honors and awards ==
Godinez Fundamental High School in Santa Ana, California, is named in Hector Godinez' honor. The public high school opened in 2007 and is part of the Santa Ana Unified School District.

Godinez was the recipient of the National Association for the Advancement of Colored People’s Human Rights Award and the Western Region’s Community Service Award. He was among the first recipients of the Postmaster General’s Award for Executive Achievement.

In 2001, Loretta Sanchez introduced H.R. 1366, To designate the United States Post Office building located at 3101 West Sunflower Avenue in Santa Ana, California, as the ‘Hector G. Godinez Post Office Building’. The bill was enacted in 2002.

== Personal life ==
The son of field workers, Godinez was born in 1924 on the grounds of San Diego Mission. His family moved to Santa Ana in 1925, where Godinez lived for the rest of his life.

Godinez was known for his collection of 50 pairs of cowboy boots and his love of Stetson hats. He was a voracious reader, especially of tomes about World War II.

Godinez died at St. Joseph Hospital in Orange after a long struggle with Parkinson's disease.
