= Fusion Academy =

Private, alternative school founded in California, US

- Type: Private School
- Established: 1989
- Website: http://www.fusionacademy.com

Fusion Academy is a private, for profit alternative school for grades 4–12. Fusion Academy offers standard, AP, and honors-level courses. These classes are either 1:1 or small class sizes. Students generally complete all schoolwork on campus. Fusion academy is backed by Leeds Equity Partners.

== History ==
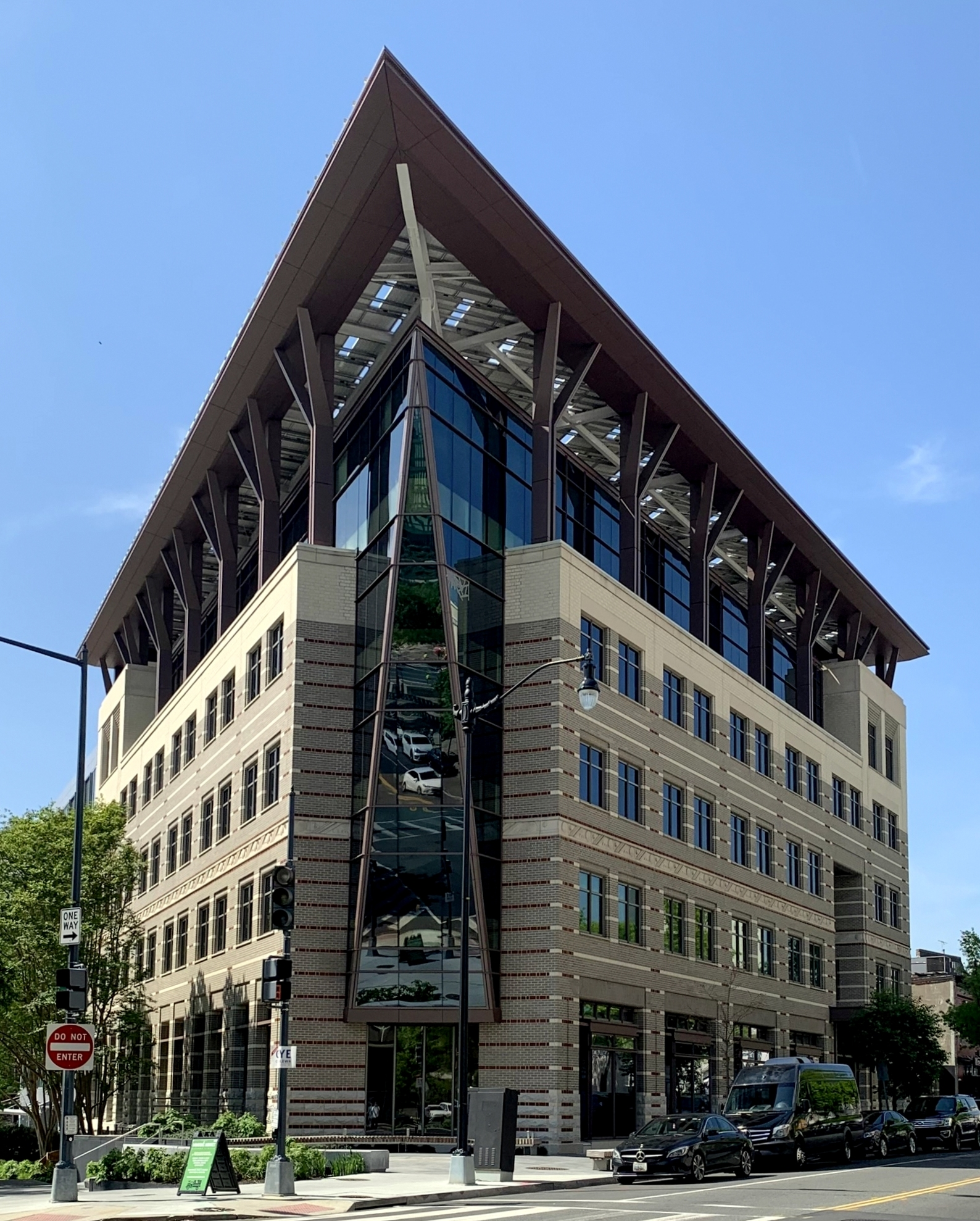
The academy's campus in Washington, D.C., is housed in the American Geophysical Union's headquarters.

Fusion Academy was founded in 1989 by Michelle Rose Gilman, as an after-school tutoring program in her garage in Solana Beach, California. The company began to offer a full-time curriculum in 2001. In 2009, the company opened its second campus in Los Angeles. In 2011, Inc. Magazine included Fusion Academy in its annual Inc. 5000 list of America's fastest-growing private companies, the second time the company had made the list.

== Campuses ==
Fusion Academy operates 80 campuses across the United States. Three Fusion Academy campuses, all in New York City, have successfully unionized. Teachers at the Columbia, Maryland campus voted to unionize in 2026. In 2019, Fusion Academy acquired Futures Academy.

== Academics ==
Fusion Academy operates year-round and accommodates both full-time and part-time students. Standard and honors-level courses include sciences, mathematics, history, social studies, the arts, English and world languages. Art and music enrichment programs cover topics such as studio art, performing arts, music theory, and studio recording. One hour breaks between classes allow time for independent study in the Homework Café. Customized summer programs are available.

Fusion Academy offers compassion and tolerance education, staff mentoring, tutoring, organizational and homework assistance, and support in areas such as time management, preparation for high school entrance, SAT, ACT, GED exams, college applications, and career planning.
