= Corona del Mar High School =

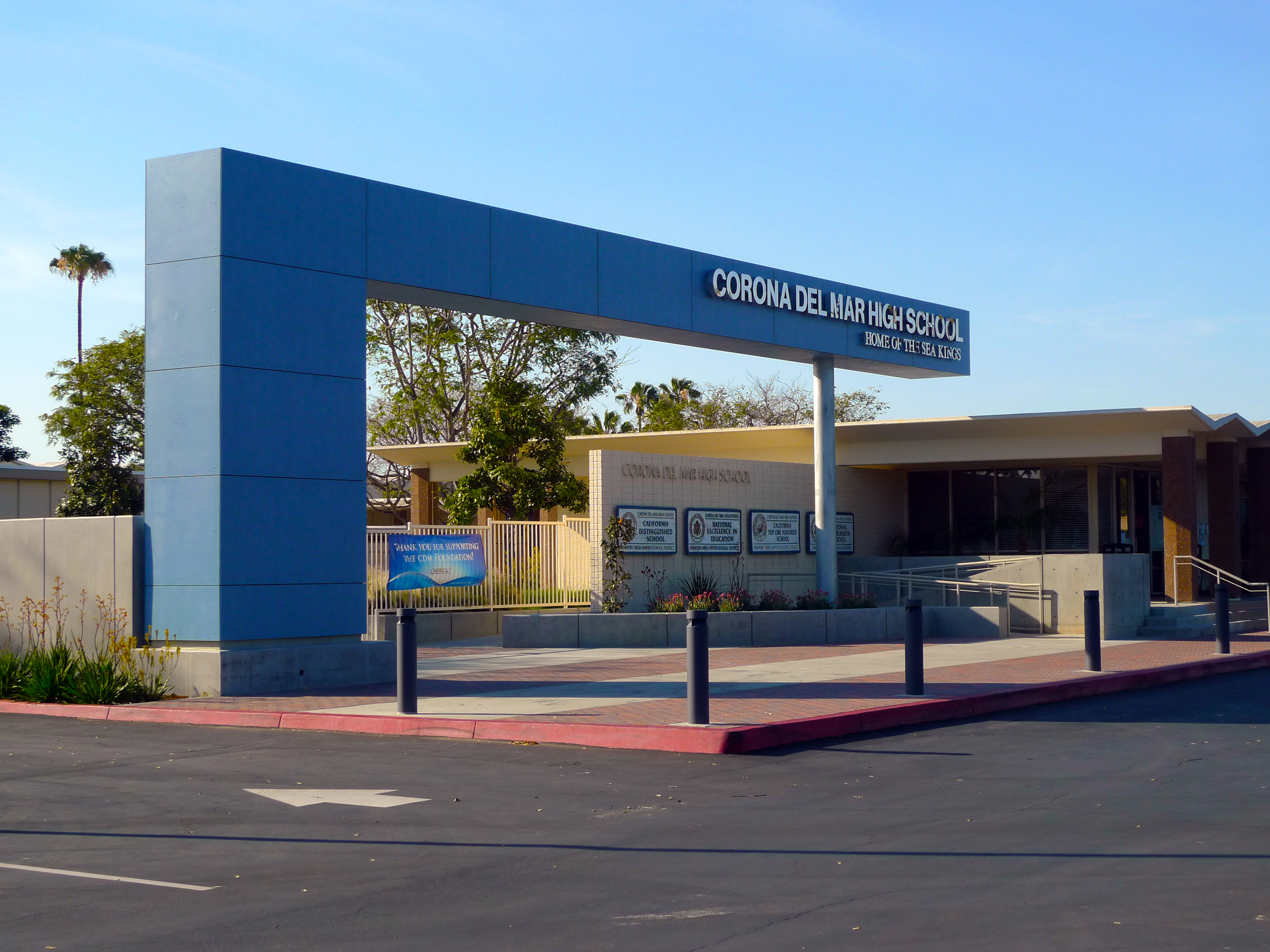
- Corona del Mar High School Front Entrance: April 2015

Location
- 2101 Eastbluff Drive; Newport Beach, California 92660; 33°38′01″N 117°52′36″W

Information
- Type: Public
- Motto: Cultivate Integrity, Develop Resiliency, Model Empathy
- Established: 1962
- School district: Newport-Mesa Unified School District
- Principal: Jacob Haley (9-12); Rebecca Gogel (7-8)
- Teaching staff: 94.42 (FTE)
- Grades: 7–12
- Enrollment: 2,042 (2023-2024)
- Student to teacher ratio: 21.63
- Colors: Navy, Columbia blue, silver and white
- Athletics conference: CIF Southern Section; Sunset League
- Nickname: Home of the Sea Kings
- Team name: High School: Sea Kings, Sea Queens; Junior High School: Tritons formerly Riptide
- Rival: Newport Harbor
- Publication: Trident Magazine
- Yearbook: Ebbtide
- Website: cdm.nmusd.us

Corona del Mar High School (CdM) is a public school located in the Eastbluff neighborhood of Newport Beach, California, and belongs to the Newport-Mesa Unified School District. It is a combination of a middle school (7th and 8th grades) and a high school (9th, 10th, 11th, and 12th grades). The school was founded in 1962 and has an enrollment of approximately 2,100 students. The school covers an area of just over 1,700,000 square feet. According to US News, there are 92 full-time teachers.

It has been ranked by Newsweek as one of the top 200 high schools in the United States, and it has been a state champion in several sports. However, it has also been featured in the national media for scandals involving homophobia, sexism, and academic dishonesty.

== History ==
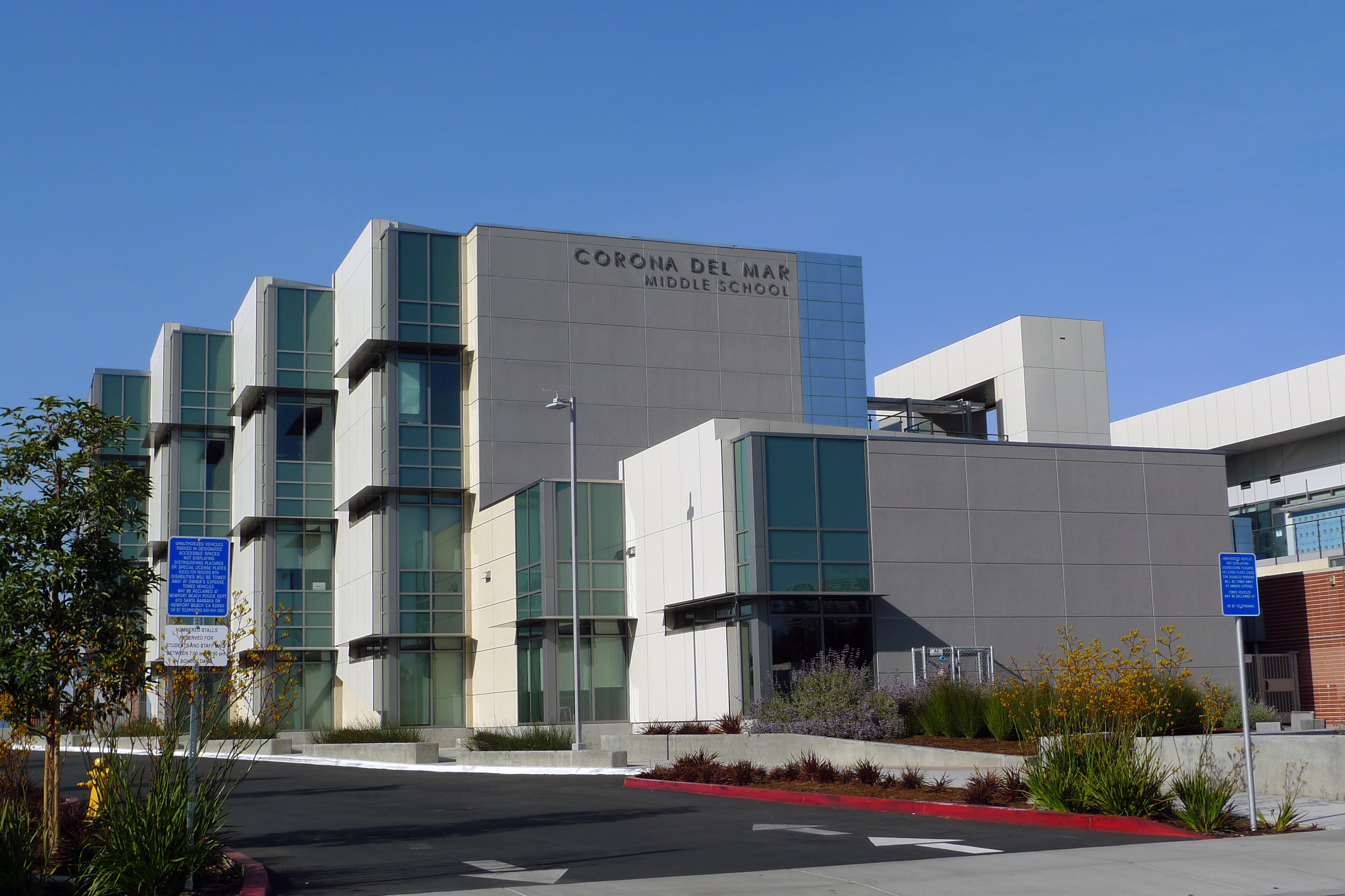
The Corona Del Mar Middle School

=== Construction ===
The school was founded in 1962. In the mid 1970s, the school went through an extensive design process to develop its media center. The Marian Bergeson Aquatic Center, named for state senator Marian Bergeson who was from Newport Beach, opened in May 1990 at a cost of $1.75 million. In March 2015, a 29,000-square-foot (2,700 m^{2}) performing arts center was finished. The center cost $16 million and seats more than 360 people. Newport-Mesa Unified School District got approval for construction of the Enclave, a 38,000 sq. ft structure consisting of two buildings(one 3-story and one 2-story) connected by passages for 7th and 8th graders. It was designed by Dougherty & Dougherty Architects and built by KPRS Construction, and was completed by June 2014 and cost $23.2 million. Construction began in June 2019 on a $14.6 million renovation project to build a new track and two lighted artificial turf sports fields, which were completed by January 2021. The track bleachers have a seating capacity of 664, and the back field has portable bleachers that can accommodate 200 spectators. As part of a two-school $5 million construction project with Ensign Intermediate School, 8-foot security fences were built around the perimeter of the school and were completed by January 2021. The project also included a new entry structure adjacent to the pool with a school sign and LED board, finished by March 2021.

=== Controversies ===
Between 2009 and 2014 Corona del Mar was the subject of a series of controversies concerning sexism and homophobia. In February 2009, when a production of the musical Rent was cancelled, the theater teacher alleged it was due to the principal objecting to the play's depiction of homosexuality. Student demand eventually brought back the play. The following month, after a video surfaced of male students threatening to rape and kill a female peer, the American Civil Liberties Union sued the school for inadequately responding to, allowing, and even condoning an atmosphere of sexist and homophobic violence. A settlement was reached in September, when the District agreed to create and enforce anti-harassment policies and train both students and staff. In May 2014, the school again attracted negative attention for an NFL-style "prom draft" in which female students were ceremonially "drafted" as dates by their male peers. Writers for the Los Angeles Times cited a former Corona del Mar High School disciplinarian in their argument that the "draft" was the result of a problematic sense of entitlement among Newport Beach residents.

The school also experienced a series of publicized academic integrity incidents. In 2012, school officials discovered that ten students had bought the answers to their tests from Amazon.com. In early 2014, eleven Corona del Mar High School students were expelled for hacking into school computers with the help of a tutor to alter their grades. The following October, the tutor was arrested on charges of burglary, computer access and fraud. In response to the hacking and "prom draft" scandals, the school hired an "ethics consultant" in June 2014, with hopes of restoring the school's reputation. The consultant's duties include training the students to accept diversity and be more honest and inclusive.

In November 2023, during the Gaza war, a student was suspended for three days for "threatening remarks to another student" after telling her "Free Palestine", the designation was confirmed by a district spokesperson who indicated that the district does not tolerate hateful speech, which prompted outrage. Shortly after the students suspension and the news being posted, the district's superintendent stated that while the suspension was still upheld the district does not consider "Free Palestine" as hate speech.

== Rankings ==
The school has been placed on multiple national and state-level lists of "top schools". In 2011 U.S. News & World Report ranked it 127 of 21,786 high schools in math and science and Newsweek included it as number 172 of the 500 best high schools in the United States. It earned a gold medal from U.S. News & World Report in 2014, with a national ranking of 222 (37 in California). Niche.com ranked the school #144 out of 16,801 for Best College Prep Public High Schools in America in 2020. U.S. News also gave the school a national ranking of 658, 89th in California, 42nd in the Los Angeles Metropolitan Area, and first in the Newport-Mesa School District. They also reported that 75% of students have taken at least one AP exam, 63% passed at least one AP exam, 63% were proficient in math, 80% were proficient in reading, and that the school has a graduation rate of 95%.

== Sports ==
Corona del Mar competes in the Sunset Conference of the CIF Southern Section, having moved from the Pacific Coast League following the 2017–2018 season. The Sea Kings have won 81 CIF Southern Section Championship and 12 California Interscholastic Federation State Championships.

The school opened a $1.75 million aquatic center in 1992. An evening fundraiser in 2007 raised $221,000 for a refurbishment project. They have won the Boys' Water polo southern section divisional title 13 times, including nine Division 1 titles.

The school has won six State Championships in Girls' Cross Country. In 2010 the boys' soccer team won the SoCal State Championship and finished ranked second in the nation. In 2011 the boys' volleyball team won the Powerade Fab 50 ESPN Rise National championship trophy. The high school also competes in sailing, crew and surfing. Corona del Mar Football won the Division III State Football Championship in 2013 as well as the Division 1-A State Championship in 2019.

Parent and booster groups annually raise large sums of money for the school and related extracurricular programs, with just three of the projects raising a total of over $235,000 annually.

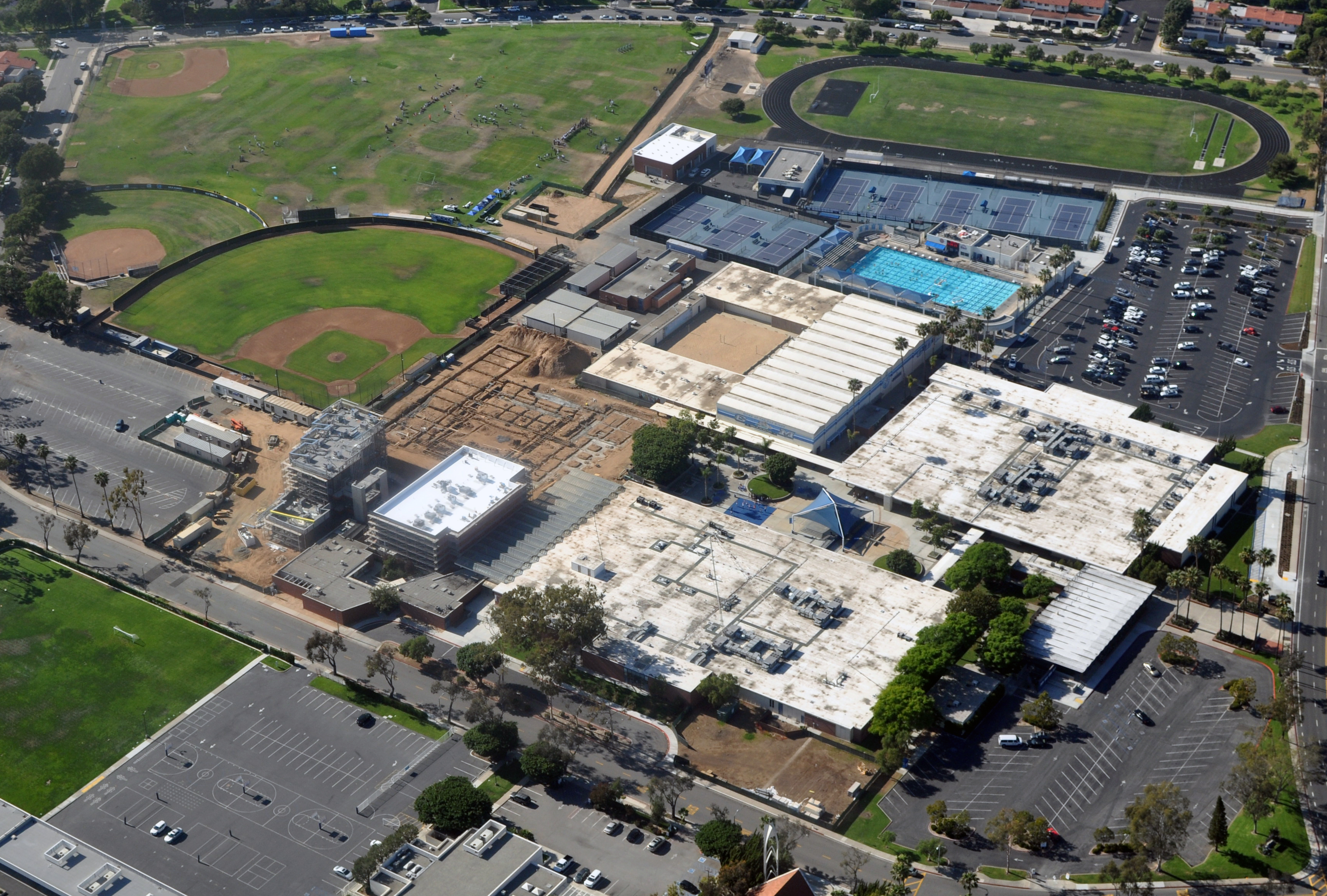
CDM high school

== Notable alumni ==
- Tumua Anae, Olympic water polo goalie
- Javiera Balmaceda, film and television producer
- Debbie Cook, 2007-2008 mayor of Huntington Beach, California
- Taylor Dent, tennis player
- Firoozeh Dumas, author
- Brian Fargo, video game designer, producer of Fallout
- Chase Garbers, quarterback for the Las Vegas Raiders
- Kevin Hansen, Olympic indoor volleyball player
- Stephania Haralabidis, American and Greek water polo player
- John Ireland, sportscaster
- Matt Keough, baseball player
- Kurt Krumpholz, is a former world-record holder in the 400-meter freestyle.
- Bill Leach, Olympic canoer
- Julie Leach, Olympic canoer, triathlete
- Brad Alan Lewis, Olympic gold medalist in rowing
- Bill Macdonald, sportscaster
- Eric Marienthal, Jazz Musician
- Jack McBean, soccer player
- Mark McGrath, lead singer of the pop rock band Sugar Ray
- McG, film director and producer
- John Mann, Olympic water polo player
- Leslie Mann, actress
- Sam Mikulak, Olympic gymnast
- Madeline Musselman, 2016 Olympic gold medalist in water polo
- Keri Phebus, tennis player, NCAA singles champion for UCLA
- Mark Redman, tight end for the Los Angeles Rams
- Dave Rohde, baseball player (Houston Astros, Cleveland Indians)
- Kelly Rutherford, actress
- Rodney Sheppard, guitarist, bass player from pop rock band Sugar Ray
- Brad Sherman, Congressman
- Michael Steele, bass guitarist for rock band The Bangles
- Jeff Thomason, football player
- Brian Tyler, composer, conductor, and producer
- Lars Ulrich, drummer, Metallica
- John Vallely, UCLA and NBA basketball player
- Neil Weber, baseball player (Arizona Diamondbacks)
