= Rancho Santiago Community College District =

Community college district in California, United States

Rancho Santiago Community College District (RSCCD)
- Type: Community college
- Established: 1915
- Affiliations: California Community Colleges
- Chancellor: Marvin Martinez
- Vice-Chancellor: Peter Hardash, Enrique Perez, and Tracie Green
- Students: 51,601 (Fall 2019)
- Location: 2323 N. Broadway; Santa Ana, California, United States; 33.7673494°N 117.8681344°W
- Website: www.rsccd.edu

The Rancho Santiago Community College District (RSCCD), one of four community college districts located in Orange County, California, offers associate degrees and adult education certificates through its two colleges: Santa Ana College in Santa Ana and Santiago Canyon College in Orange.

The RSCCD serves central and eastern Orange County, covering 24% of the county's total area (193 square miles) in the cities of Orange and Villa Park, as well as the community of Anaheim Hills and portions of the cities of Garden Grove, Irvine, Santa Ana, and Tustin.

The RSCCD is governed by a board of trustees that is composed of seven trustees elected by the registered voters within the district's boundaries and one student member elected by the student body of Santa Ana College and Santiago Canyon College. Trustees, with the exception of the student member, are elected to four-year terms commencing in December of the year elected. As terms are staggered, elections are held every two years in connection with the general election. The seven locally elected trustees must reside in three specific areas but are elected at-large.

The current trustees and the areas that they were elected from are as follows:

Trustee Area	Name	Year First Elected/Appointed	Year Last Elected
1	Zeke Hernandez	2016 (elected)	2024
2	John R. Hanna	1998 (appointed)	2022
3	Cecilia "Ceci" Iglesias	2024 (elected)	2024
4	Daisy Tong	2022 (elected)	2022
5	David Crockett	2020 (elected)	2024
6	Phillip E. Yarbrough	1996 (elected)	2022
7	Tina Arias Miller	2020 (elected)	2024
Student	Ricardo Alcaraz	2024–2025	

For 2024, Trustee Daisy Tong is serving as the Board President, Trustee Phillip E. Yarbrough as the Board Vice President, and Trustee Zeke Hernandez as the Board Clerk.
