= West End Theater (Santa Ana) =

Historic movie theater in Santa Ana, California

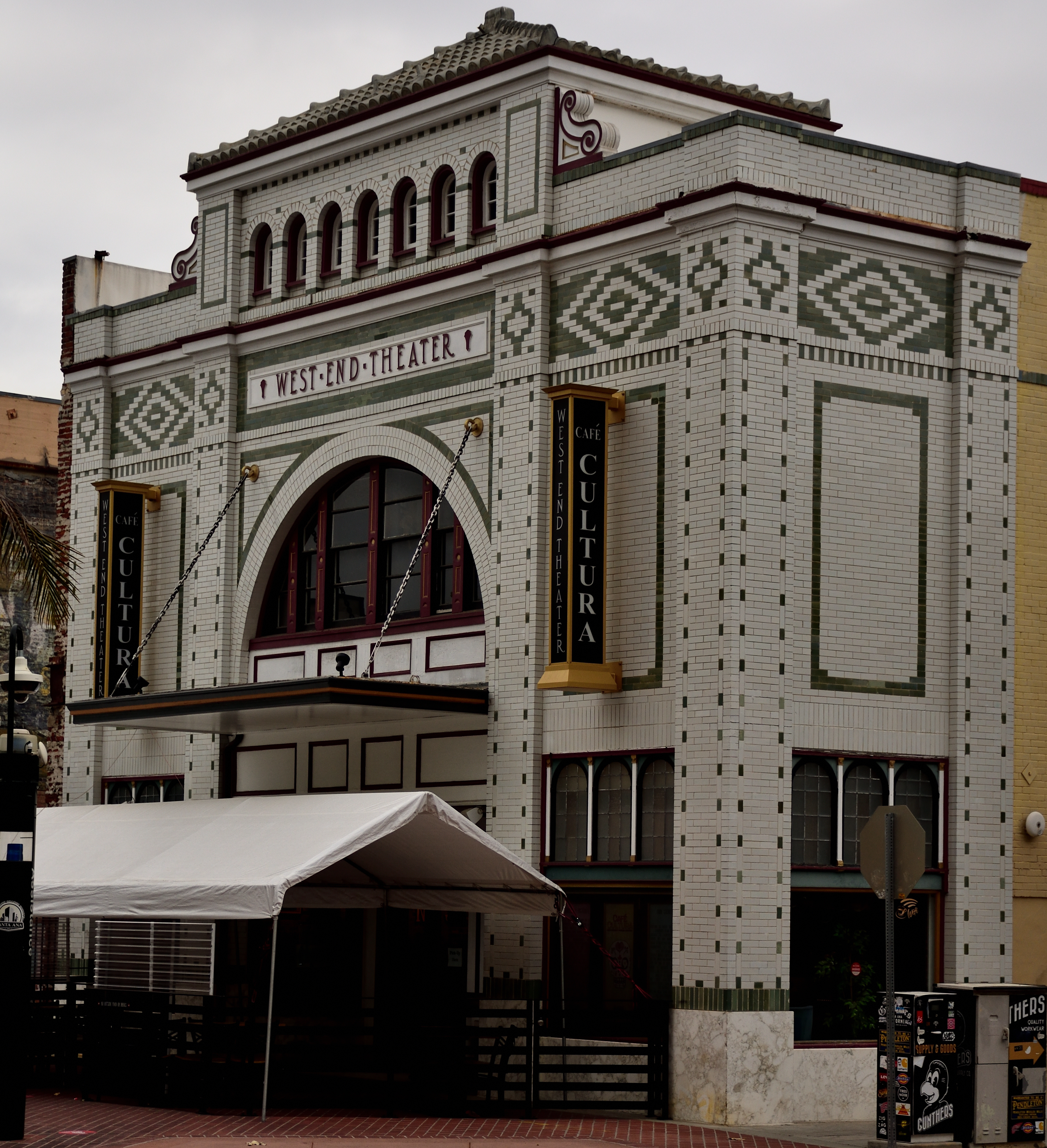
- The theater's facade in 2021
- Interactive map of West End Theater
- Former names: Walker's State Theater; State Theater; Guild Theater; State Arts Theater
- Address: 324 W 4th Street; Santa Ana, California; United States
- Coordinates: 33°44′52″N 117°52′15″W

Construction
- Opened: July 15, 1915; 111 years ago
- Closed: 1978; 48 years ago
- Cost: US$12,000
- Architect: James Flood Walker

The West End Theater is a historic former movie theater on 4th Street in Santa Ana, California. Developer L. A. Schlesinger commissioned the theater in 1915 and architect James Flood Walker designed the building. It was later operated by Santa Ana theater proprietor C. E. Walker and named the State Theater. It showed arthouse and foreign film in the 1960s as the Guild Theater and was operated as an adult movie theater called the State Arts Theater in the 1970s. After the venue closed in 1978, the building survived a series of demolitions downtown. It has since been repurposed as a cafe.

== History ==
From 1909 to 1915, theater proprietor J. A. Schlesinger operated the Temple Theatre, the first movie theater in Orange County. In 1915, he commissioned the West End Theater at a cost of US$12,000 as a replacement for the Temple, crediting the success of the old theater as the impetus for constructing a newer facility. Amidst its construction in June, the Santa Ana Daily Register called the venue a "handsome show house" and a "credit to the west end" of town. Schlesinger closed the Temple in July 1915 and opened the West End on July 15, 1915.

In April 1920, E. D. Yost acquired the West End Theater. In June 1927, he sold the lease to the venue, along with the Yost Theater on Spurgeon Street, to Universal Chain Theatrical Enterprises, a theater chain owned by Universal Pictures co-founder Carl Laemmle. The venue's next owner, C. E. Walker, renamed it as Walker's State Theatre and in 1935 installed a new marquee and neon lights.

On April 27, 1966, the venue reopened as the Guild Theater, an arthouse and foreign film cinema. It debuted with Juliet of the Spirits, which had only one prior premiere screening in Greater Los Angeles. In the 1970s, the auditorium operated as an adult movie theater called the State Arts Theater. The West End building was last operated as a movie theater in 1978 and since has been converted into a cafe.

== Architecture ==
James Flood Walker designed the West End Theater when it was commissioned in 1915. The building features a green and white enameled brick design and a hip roof tower above its second floor. In 1966, when the venue reopened as the Guild Theater, it was renovated to include a new metal facade that obscured the original Walker design. During a renovation in 1984, the West End was restored to its original state with the removal of the metal.
