= Marvin Martinez =

Salvadoran-American academic administrator

Chancellor of Rancho Santiago Community College District
- Incumbent
- Assumed office 2019

President of East Los Angeles College
- In office 2013 – 2019
- Preceded by: Farley Herzek

President of Los Angeles Harbor College
- In office 2010 – 2013

Personal details
- Born: El Salvador
- Children: 4
- Education: University of California, Los Angeles (BA, MA)
- Occupation: Academic administrator

Marvin Martinez is a Salvadoran American academic administrator. He is chancellor of Rancho Santiago Community College District, having previously been president of Los Angeles Harbor College and East Los Angeles College.

== Early life and education ==
Martinez was born in El Salvador. He immigrated to Brooklyn and later moved to Long Beach, California. Martinez graduated from Woodrow Wilson Classical High School. He earned a Bachelor of Arts in English from the University of California, Los Angeles (UCLA). He completed a Master of Arts in urban planning from UCLA.

== Career ==
Martinez was the dean of business and industry at Cerritos College. He was the vice president of planning and development of the Santa Monica Community College District and the provost of Santa Monica College. Martinez was the president of Los Angeles Harbor College from 2010 to 2013. He oversaw a $444 million bond construction project and balanced the college budget in his first year. Martinez became the president of East Los Angeles College in July 2013, replacing interim president Farley Herzek. On July 1, 2019, Martinez became the Chancellor of the Rancho Santiago Community College District.

While at Rancho Santiago Community College District, Martinez and his top staff were found to have possibly violated multiple state laws according to an audit of a secret fund hidden from trustees and taxpayers.

As announced at the RSCCD Board Meeting on Tuesday, September 1, Chancellor Marvin Martinez was placed on paid administrative leave pending completion of an investigation.

== Personal life ==
Martinez has four children.
