= Santa Ana College =

Community college in Santa Ana, California, US

- Other name: SAC
- Motto: Celebrated Past. Boundless Future.
- Type: Public community college
- Established: 1915
- Affiliations: Rancho Santiago Community College District, California Community Colleges
- President: Annebelle Nery
- Students: 37,916 (fall 2015)
- Location: Santa Ana, California, United States; 33.7596°N 117.8875°W
- Campus: Suburban, 48 acres (19 ha)
- Colors: Red and black
- Nickname: Dons
- Website: www.sac.edu

Santa Ana College is a public community college in Santa Ana, California, United States.

== History ==
In 1915, Santa Ana Junior College opened its doors to 25 students as a department of Santa Ana High School. It was the second community college founded in Orange County, behind Fullerton College, and the fourth oldest in all of California.

In 1932, a charter of Gamma Sigma Fraternity International was granted. Beta Alpha Chapter was at the school from 1932 to 1938, but anti-fraternity agitation and lack of communication with the organization in the east made the chapter dormant by 1938.

The 1933 Long Beach earthquake damaged the Santa Ana High School building, prompting the campus move to North Main Street where it remained until 1947.

A bond issue passed in 1945, paving the way for development of a 48-acre (194,000 m^{2}) campus at its current location.

Santa Ana College plays host to Middle College High School, a small alternative high school in the Santa Ana Unified School District in which students can earn their Associate of Arts degree at the same time as their high school diploma.

In the late 1970s the college purchased the properties on Martha Lane south of the original campus and that land is now part of the parking lot. Recent years have witnessed the further development of and annexation of adjacent property to the original location.

For a short time, the college was known as Rancho Santiago College, but the name changed back to Santa Ana College in the late 1990s.

In 1985, a satellite campus, which is now called Santiago Canyon College, was established in Orange, California. Santiago Canyon has since grown in size to become a separate college from Santa Ana College, although both colleges are part of the Rancho Santiago Community College District.

== Academics ==
The college has various programs lead to the awarding of associate degrees in arts and sciences, as well as vocational certificates.

Santa Ana College is home to the Tessmann Planetarium, which was renovated and now has a state-of-the art planetarium system. It is the largest, both in diameter (30 ft) and seating capacity planetarium in Orange County. It was completed and became operational in 1967.

The college is also home to Around and About Orange County News and Noticiero Latino del Condado de Orange (NLCO), student-produced weekly news shows. NLCO was the first Spanish language college newscast produced by a community college.

The TV Department uses the college's Digital Media Center to produce, shoot, and edit the college's newscast.

The Journalism & Media Studies Department writes, edits, and publishes the college's nationally recognized online and printed newspaper, el Don.

== Athletics ==
Santa Ana College sponsors 18 sports programs. Men's sports are baseball, basketball, cross country, football, soccer, swimming, track and field, water polo and wrestling. Women's sports are basketball, beach volleyball, cross country, soccer, softball, swimming, track and field, volleyball and water polo.

== Notable alumni ==
- Duane Allen, NFL player
- Barry Asher, Hall of Fame bowler
- Heath Bell, retired MLB All-Star pitcher
- Bob Boyd, Basketball coach
- George Brancato, NFL player and CFL All-star
- Lem Burnham, NFL player
- Al Carmichael, NFL player
- Ed Caruthers, high jump Olympian
- Nancy Fuller, host of Food Network's Farmhouse Rules
- Robert David Hall, actor on the television series CSI: Crime Scene Investigation
- Bob Hamelin, MLB player
- Diane Keaton, Academy Award-winning actress
- Khan Malaythong, Olympic badminton player
- Cathy Marino, Team USA Kayak in the 1988 and 1992 Olympics
- Yael Markovich, Israeli/American model and beauty queen/pageant titleholder (Miss Israel)
- Steve Martin, Emmy- and Grammy-winning actor
- Kris Medlen, former MLB pitcher for the Kansas City Royals, Atlanta Braves, and Arizona Diamondbacks
- Dan Meyer, MLB player
- Louie Olivos Jr., actor, promoter, producer, director and playwright
- Rick Ownbey, MLB player
- Kasey Peters, American football player
- John Pitts, NFL player
- Jim Steffen, NFL player
- Larry Stuart, world record setting javelin thrower
- Joe Taufeteʻe, rugby player
- Bill Thomas, member of the United States House of Representatives
- Gaddi Vasquez, United States ambassador to the United Nations Agencies for Food and Agriculture; director of the Peace Corps
- Jose Vasquez, professional soccer player
- Bob Webster, diving champion, won gold medals at both the 1960 and 1964 Olympic games
- Ray Willsey, football coach
- CJ Wilson, Class of 1998, baseball player, Los Angeles Angels of Anaheim starting pitcher
- Tony Zendejas, former NFL kicker
