= Century High School (Santa Ana, California) =

Coordinates: 33°43′47″N 117°50′58″W

Location
- 1401 S Grand Ave; Santa Ana, California; United States

Information
- Type: Public
- Established: 1989
- School district: Santa Ana Unified School District
- Principal: Nata Shin
- Grades: 9-12
- Colors: Blue, silver, and green
- Mascot: Centurion
- Website: century.sausd.us

Century High School is located in Santa Ana, California. It was built in 1989. Its mascot is the Centurion, and the school colors are blue, silver, and green.

== Student body ==
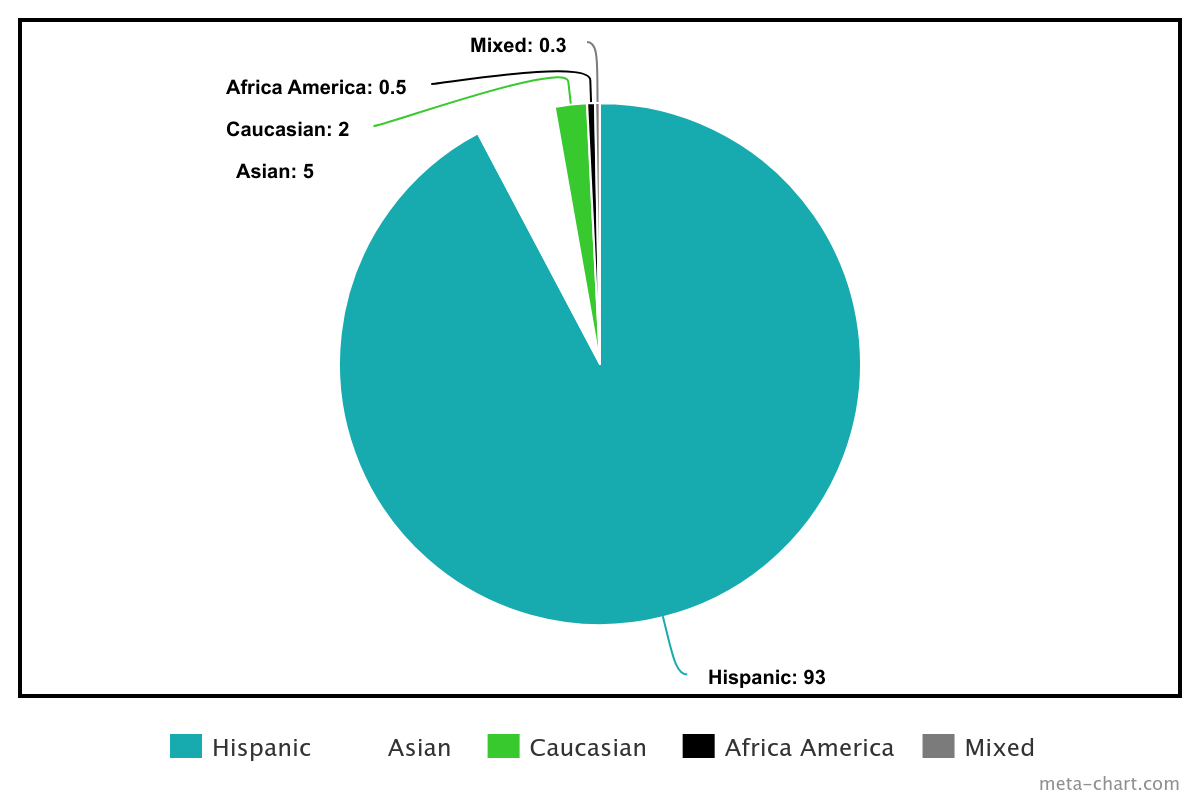
students body demographic March 2024

The school's student body is largely homogeneous and reflects the Latino ethnic makeup of the surrounding community. It is composed of roughly 93% Hispanic, 5% Asian, 2% Caucasian, 0.5% African American, 0.3% other and mixed and includes 7 different languages spoken. Student life can be seen on the morning broadcast that the school produces every day.

== Academics ==
Century High School is a comprehensive high school offering a full range of a-g courses necessary for University of California and Cal State acceptance. Century has two Career Partnership Academies. The TEACH Academy (Teacher Education At Century High) develops future teachers. The e-Business Academy develops future leaders in business and entrepreneurs. Within the last two years, CST scores have gone higher than expected and have improved; however, not enough to keep the school off of the state's list of persistently low-performing schools. In 2014, Century received a six-year WASC accreditation, which is unusual for a school the federal government considers to not be meeting its AYP.

== Athletics ==
Century High School athletics include: football, basketball, soccer, Polynesian, tennis, track and field, cross country, volleyball, softball, baseball, wrestling and some smaller branches of physical education such as dance, Pep Squad, NJROTC, colorguard. Century's Pep Squad and Colorguard members are recognized for their achievements in National competition and for their spirit and motivation.

== Notable alumni ==
- Hebron Fangupo played defensive tackle for the USC Trojans and BYU Cougars and played in the NFL for the Pittsburgh Steelers, Seattle Seahawks, Kansas City Chiefs, and the Washington Commanders. He is the defensive line coach for Snow College and the Utah Tech Trailblazers (formerly Dixie State.)
