= New Walker Theatre =

Historic former movie theater in Santa Ana, California

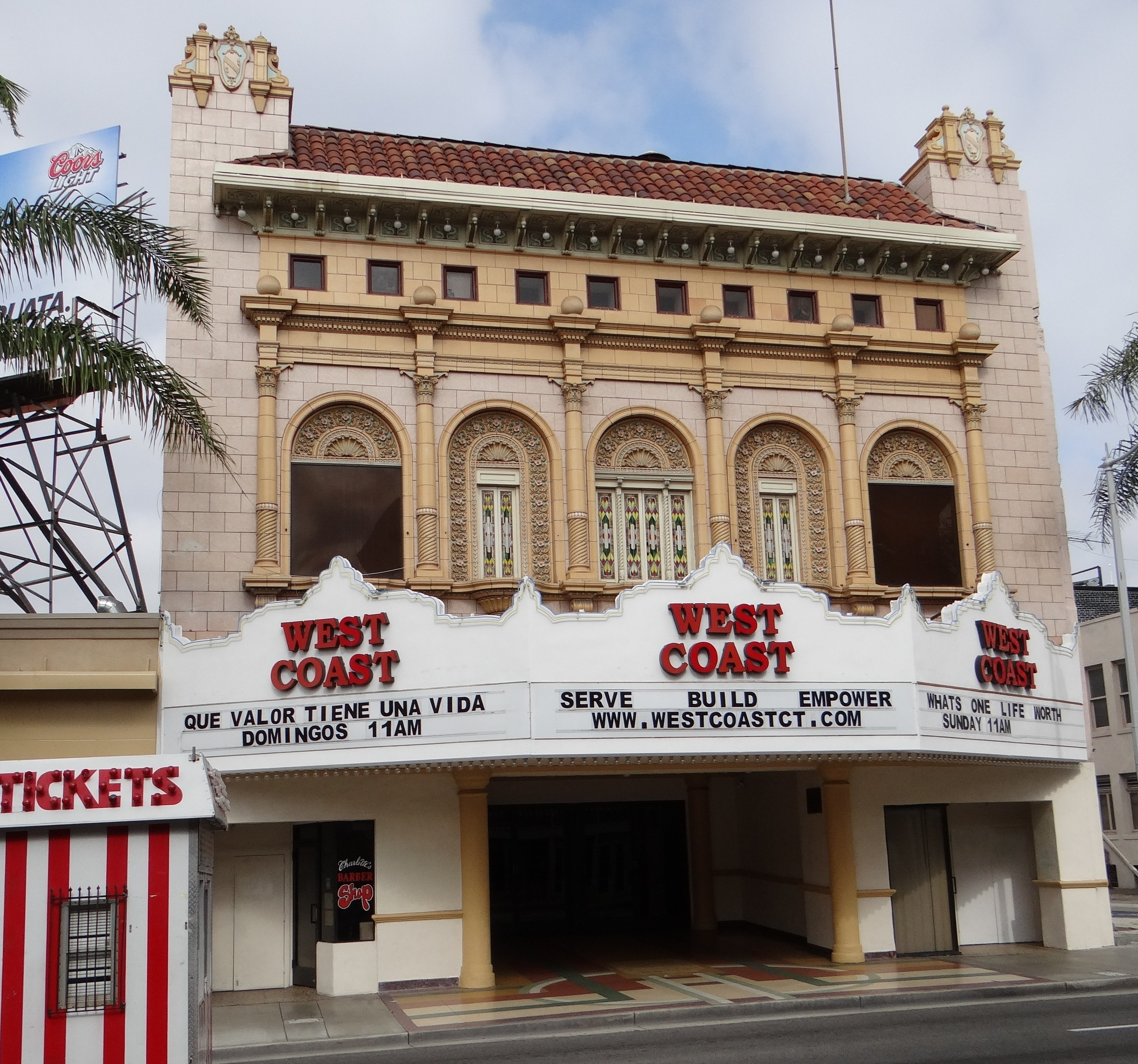
- The theater's facade in 2012
- Interactive map of New Walker Theatre
- Former names: Fox Walker Theatre; West Coast Walker Theatre; Fox West Coast Theatre
- Address: 308 N Main Street; Santa Ana, California; United States
- Coordinates: 33°44′51″N 117°52′05″W

Construction
- Opened: January 29, 1924; 102 years ago
- Closed: c. 1980s
- Architect: Boller Brothers
- Walker's Orange County Theatre
- U.S. National Register of Historic Places
- NRHP reference No.: 82002224
- Added to NRHP: February 19, 1982

The New Walker Theatre is a historic former movie theater on Main Street in Santa Ana, California. Opened in 1924, it came under new management as the Fox Walker Theatre in 1925 and later operated as the West Coast Theatre. Theater specialist firm Boller Brothers designed the building in the Mission Revival and Moderne styles; it was the group's 100th project. The New Walker Theatre was added to the National Register of Historic Places on February 19, 1982. Following its closure as a movie theater in the 1980s, the auditorium was later purchased and renovated by a church in 1991.

== History ==
Charles E. Walker commissioned the construction of a US$250,000 movie theater on the site of the former Princess Theatre, a venue he operated from 1914 until 1923 when he moved it to 4th Street. House & Graham served as general contractor for the project; construction began in September 1923. Two construction crews finished pouring concrete in early November 1923 and a third shift was added for the beginning of the building's steelwork with the expectation that the facility would be ready to open on Christmas Eve. Walker later set the opening date for New Year's Eve, with crews in turn working around the clock to complete the venue. Walker promised that the theater would be "equal in beauty and arrangement" to any of its size in Greater Los Angeles.

Due to construction delays, Walker pushed back the grand opening of the theater from New Year's Eve and it ultimately premiered on January 29, 1924. The Santa Ana Daily Register heralded the New Walker Theatre as a "credit to Santa Ana" upon its debut. A showing of the silent film The Man from Brodney's served as the feature for the venue's opening with members of the cast, including J. Warren Kerrigan, Alice Calhoun, and Wanda Hawley, in attendance.

In September 1925, the Fox West Coast Theatres chain acquired the New Walker and its namesake was retained as resident manager of the venue. By 1950, the New Walker had been acquired by Cabart Theaters Corporation, which renovated the auditorium thereafter. The New Walker continued screening movies until its closure in the 1980s. In 1991, a congregation called Christian Tabernacle purchased the building for $750,000 and spent $50,000 on its renovation for use as a church.

== Architecture ==
Carl and Robert Boller, working jointly through their firm Boller Brothers, designed the theater in a blend of the Mission Revival and Moderne styles. The 50 foot (15 m)-wide, 145 foot (44 m)-deep building features a single-screen auditorium. The original configuration included 1,355 seats, 800 of which were orchestra, 500 balcony, and 55 loge. Crews tested the durability of the balcony with a 25-ton weight. The auditorium also featured a Wurlitzer organ. Upon its completion, the Santa Ana Daily Register called the New Walker an "architectural wonder" among the finest theaters in the country.

== See also ==
- National Register of Historic Places listings in Orange County, California
