= Segerstrom High School =

Location
- 2301 W. MacArthur Blvd. Santa Ana, California; United States
- 33.701207°N 117.901711°W

Information
- Type: Public
- Mottoes: Read, Write, Learn; Resilience, Ownership, Achievement, Respect
- Opened: September 2005
- School district: Santa Ana Unified School District
- Principal: Ms. Arias
- Teaching staff: 99 (FTE)
- Grades: 9–12
- Enrollment: 2,513 (2022-23)
- Student to teacher ratio: 25.09
- Classes offered: College Prep, Honors, Dual Enrollment, AP
- Colors: Crimson, gold, and black
- Athletics: Yes
- Athletics conference: CIF Southern Section; Golden West League
- Sports: Basketball, football, flag football, baseball, softball, volleyball, soccer, tennis, lacrosse, cross country, track & field, swim, water polo, drone soccer
- Mascot: Jake the Jaguar
- Nickname: Jaguars
- Rival: Godinez Fundamental High School
- Accreditation: WASC
- SAT & ACT average: 1090 & 22
- Newspaper: Segerstrom News
- Website: segerstrom.sausd.us

Segerstrom High School (/ˈsɛɡərstrəm/ SEH-gər-strəm, locally /ˈsɛɪɡərstrəm/ SAY-gər-strəm) is a public high school in Santa Ana, California, and is part of the Santa Ana Unified School District (SAUSD). The school opened in the fall of 2005. Segerstrom High School is named after wealthy landowner Henry Segerstrom. The land upon which Segerstrom High School is built was purchased from the Segerstrom family, who had once grown crops on the land.

== Students ==
The class of 2008 was the first to graduate from Segerstrom.

Segerstrom graduates 43% of its students compared to other schools in the district which consistently graduate a much smaller percentage of their students. Furthermore, over 39% of Segerstrom students either enroll in community college or pursue a degree from a four-year institution.

As of the 2023–2024 school year, there were 2,499 students attending Segerstrom.

== Buildings ==
The school is divided into five buildings. Building A houses the main office, library, gym, and the English Department. Building B houses a 430-seat Performing Arts Center as well as the band, choir, and drama classrooms. Building C is labeled "Humanities" and houses the World Languages, Social Sciences, some of the Visual and Performing Arts (VAPA) Department, and the ASB office respectively. Building D houses the Science department and some music classrooms and Building E houses the Mathematics Department.

Segerstrom also features a full-sized football stadium with an all-weather running track surrounding the field (Jaguar Stadium). It was the first football field to be constructed on any high school in the Santa Ana Unified School District's schools. Before its construction, that district maintained a contract with the City Santa Ana's Parks and Recreation Department to use the citywide stadium (Eddie West Field). Jaguar Stadium now serves to host many of Segerstrom's weekly football games during the season.
