= Costa Mesa Middle and High School =

Location
- 2650 Fairview Road; Costa Mesa, California 92626; United States
- Coordinates: 33°40′20″N 117°54′23″W

Information
- Type: Public
- Established: 1958
- School district: Newport Mesa Unified School District
- Principal: Dipali Potnis
- Staff: 94.40 (FTE)
- Grades: 7–12
- Enrollment: 1,761 (2023-2024)
- Student to teacher ratio: 18.65
- Colors: Green, white, and black
- Athletics conference: CIF-SS Orange Coast League, Coastal Athletic League
- Nickname: Mustangs, Mavericks
- Newspaper: The Hitching Post, Mav News
- Website: cmhs.nmusd.us

Costa Mesa Middle and High School is a public secondary school serving grades 7 through 12 in Costa Mesa, California. It is part of the Newport Mesa Unified School District.

== Campus ==
In 2009, the Newport-Mesa Board of Education approved plans for a new middle school enclave and a performing arts center. In 2010, a $6.6 million aquatics center featuring a 50-meter swimming pool, locker rooms, and a classroom was opened. Before this, the pool was 25 yards long and in the shape of an L. In 2011, Costa Mesa Middle School opened its teen center. In 2013, plans were approved for a new track and field on campus. That same year, the final construction beam was in place for the new middle school enclave building. In 2014, Costa Mesa High School opened a new performing arts center with a 335-seat theater. In 2016, construction of the new track and football stadium was completed.

== Athletics ==
Costa Mesa High School is part of the Orange Coast League of the CIF Southern Section, part of the California Interscholastic Federation.

== Notable alumni ==
- Quinton Bell, NFL player
- Sharon Day-Monroe, Olympic athlete
- Bob Ernst, rowing coach
- Bob Flanagan, performance artist
- Brent Mayne, MLB Catcher
- Dan Quisenberry, MLB pitcher
- Benny Ricardo, NFL placekicker
