= Middle College High School (Santa Ana) =

Coordinates: 33.760061°N 117.88859°W

Location
- 1530 W 17th St; Santa Ana, California; United States

Information
- Type: Public
- Motto: "College Starts Here!"
- Established: 1996
- School district: Santa Ana Unified School District
- Principal: Damon Voight
- Teaching staff: 19.54 (FTE)
- Grades: 9–12
- Enrollment: 407 (2023–2024)
- Student to teacher ratio: 20.83
- Colors: purple, silver, blue
- Mascot: Wizard
- Newspaper: The Spellbinder
- Website: middlecollege.sausd.us

Middle College High School @ Santa Ana College (commonly referred to as Middle College or MCHS) is located on the campus of Santa Ana College in Santa Ana, California. The school serves an average of 400 students consisting of 100–120 pupils in each grade level. High school classes average around 20–25 students, including grade levels 9–12. The school's mascot is the wizard, and the school's colors are purple, silver, and blue.

== Background ==
MCHS allows high school students to take high school classes and college courses at the same time, also known as dual enrollment. It was only in the year 2003 that ninth graders participated in the program, as part of the transition to the Early College model conceptualized by the Middle College National Consortium.

Most students have the opportunity to earn credit and to complete from a year to even an AA Degree or an Honors AA Degree worth of college classes. Most students take 3 to 11 college units a semester. Students have educational plans that structure their learning so that they can complete their AA requirements at Santa Ana College while completing their high school coursework.

College courses are free to all MCHS students because educational partners such as the Bill and Melinda Gates Foundation offer grants to pay for the students' college tuition and textbooks. MCHS has a high school academic counselor and a full-time SAC academic counselor who help students plan their courses. The school is staffed by 13 teachers who are responsible for teaching the core curricula and many electives. The students spend their day taking both college and high school classes along with participating in many extra-curricular activities.

== Athletics ==
Middle College High School has sports such as volleyball, soccer, football and basketball. Middle college also offers college sports in which students must be 18 years or older to participate. Most universities only check the high school and college grades for the student's sophomore and junior year. In order to take college courses while at MCHS, student's parents have to sign the CAPP form, a permission slip, saying that the parents agree to let the student take the course that was assigned. Students take college PE classes to fulfill their physical education classes. Such classes include yoga, dance (from ballet to hip hop), circuit training, track, swimming, aerobics, soccer, etc.

== Achievements ==
Although the school is still growing, it has many achievements that are noteworthy: Honorable Mention as a CA Distinguished High School; growth in its API score; and a 100% pass rate on the CAHSEE for the last seven consecutive years. Most recently, U.S. News & World Report ranks Middle College High among the "Best High Schools" in the nation. In 2008, based on its API score, Middle College High School was ranked the 5th best high school in Orange County, California. In 2009 and 2015, MCHS received a Blue Ribbon Award and was named a California Distinguished School. In 2010, MCHS's score on the Star Tests was 890. (Their goal in 2011 was to reach 900.) On October 11, 2012, the current principal announced their Star Test score to be 906, making MCHS one of the only 10 schools in Orange County to receive a score greater than 900. In 2016, MCHS received another Blue Ribbon Award and was once again named a California Distinguished School.
