= Saddleback High School =

Location
- 2802 S. Flower St. Santa Ana, California; United States; 33.70854°N 117.87802°W

Information
- Type: Public high school
- Established: 1967
- School district: Santa Ana Unified School District (SAUSD)
- Principal: Atikah Osman, Ed.D.
- Teaching staff: 75.24 (FTE)
- Grades: 7-12
- Enrollment: 1,499 (2023–2024)
- Student to teacher ratio: 19.92
- Campus: Urban
- Colors: Green, gold and white
- Athletics conference: CIF-SS Orange Coast League
- Mascot: Roadrunner
- Website: saddleback.sausd.us
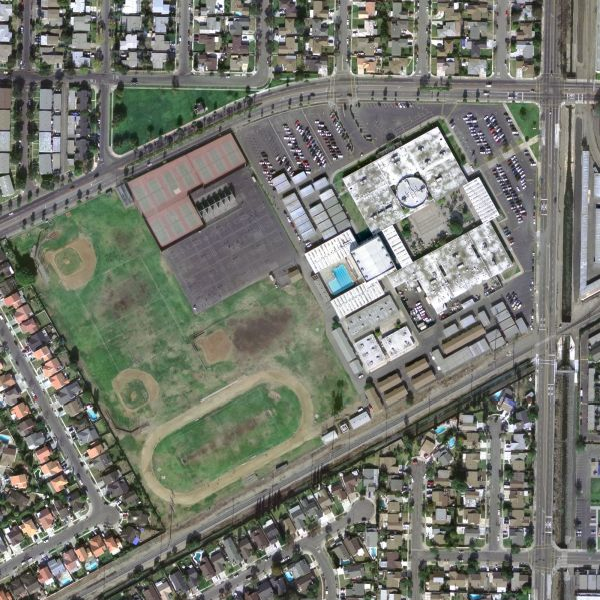
- Aerial photograph of Saddleback High School

Saddleback High School is a six-year IB secondary school located in Santa Ana, California, United States, and is part of the Santa Ana Unified School District. The school was established in 1967. Its mascot is the roadrunner, and its colors are green, gold, and white.

The school principal from 2009 to June 2015 was Dr. Robert Laxton, and Edward Bustamante from 2015 to 2025. The current principal is Dr. Atikah Osman.

Saddleback High School has adopted the nickname "The College Majors School."

== Notable Alumni ==
- Daniel Arreolaiola]] - Sport caster for Fox news
- David Bernal - Famous Dancer
- Danny Lee Clark - voice and film actor, gladiator turned host of American Gladiators
- Jere Fields - film and television actress
- Tony Guerrero - jazz musician, composer, producer and writer
- Henry Hate - celebrity tattoo artist and visual artist
- Rishard Matthews - wide receiver, Miami Dolphins, Tennessee Titans, 2012–2019
- Erasmo Ramirez - professional baseball player
- Ronny Rios - Mexican-American professional boxer in the Super Featherweight division
- Terry Rossio - screenwriter and film producer, Shrek and Pirates of the Caribbean: The Curse of the Black Pearl
- Eddie "Piolín" Sotelo - Spanish-media radio host, KSCA FM
