= Santa Ana Unified School District =

School district in California, United States

Address
- 1601 E. Chestnut Ave. Santa Ana, California, 92701; United States

District information
- Type: Public
- Grades: K–12
- NCES District ID: 0635310

Students and staff
- Students: 44,102
- Teachers: 1,836.5
- Staff: 2,502.24
- Student–teacher ratio: 24.11

Other information
- Website: www.sausd.us

The Santa Ana Unified School District (SAUSD) is a school district in Orange County, California, United States, that serves most of the city of Santa Ana and small portions of the cities of Irvine, Tustin, Costa Mesa and Newport Beach. Although its geographic size is only 24 square miles (62 km^{2}), it is the 12th largest school district in the state of California with approximately 44,102 students. The school district employs approximately 4,500 staff, and its operating budget is $483.1 million.

== History ==
Founded in 1888, the district has grown and changed in response to demographic, economic and educational trends.

=== Police Department ===
The Santa Ana Unified School District Police Department is the 2nd largest school police agency in California with 30 sworn officers, 41 civilian safety officers, 6 dispatchers, and 3 full-time administrative personnel. The department is the primary law enforcement agency for the school district. The Santa Ana School Police Department is an approved law enforcement agency in accordance with the Commission on Peace Officer Standards and Training (P.O.S.T.). Santa Ana School Police officers get their peace officer status from California Penal Code, Section 830.32(b).

=== Charter Dispute with OCSA ===
In early 2019, charter-holder Santa Ana Unified School District (SAUSD) threatened not to renew the Orange County School of the Arts' (OCSA) charter over a claim of an alleged misallocation of $19,000,000 in Special Education funding as well as an additional claim that OCSA's existing admissions practices were discriminatory and resulted in a student body did not represent demographics of Santa Ana's largely Hispanic neighborhoods.

Principal Ralph Opacic defended OCSA by saying,

"We are the Orange County School of the Arts, not the Santa Ana School of the Arts. The blame for not serving more Santa Ana students is misplaced. Santa Ana Unified should be working harder to provide more arts-rich experiences for kids, so they discover and follow that pathway"

In early 2020, OCSA brought their case to the Orange County Board of Education (OCBE), and asked for the OCBE to renew their charter instead, and on March 4, 2020, The Orange County Board of Education voted to renew the school's five year charter, resulting in the forfeiture of SAUSD's governing rights over OCSA as a school in their district.

SAUSD was to remain governing over OCSA until June 30, 2020, and on July 1, the Orange County Board of Education gained control over the school.

As of the 2020-2021 school year, OCSA has instituted new admissions requirements involving "auditions" being replaced with "placement activities" to determine if potential students are a fit for the conservatories they have applied to. If there are too many applications accepted, an admissions lottery will be instituted.

=== Ethnic Studies lawsuit ===
On September 11, 2023, The Louis D. Brandeis Center For Human Rights Under the Law, Anti-Defamation League, American Jewish League, Potomac Law Group, and Stand With Us filed a lawsuit, on behalf of students, against SAUSD that “alleged violations of California’s open meetings law, including failing to provide proper public notice before approving multiple ethnic studies courses containing anti-Jewish bias and for refusing to protect the public, including members of the Jewish community, from intimidation and harassment at Board meetings.” Plaintiffs allege SAUSD violated the Brown Act, which prohibits secret legislation by public bodies and requires open meetings. The lawsuit asked the court to block the controversial curriculum. In 2025, the district settled the lawsuit, agreeing to refrain from teaching Ethnic Studies World Geography, Ethnic Studies World Histories, and Ethnic Studies: Perspectives, Identities, and Social Justice pending review and revisions involving public input.

== Ethnic makeup ==
- 93.1% Latino
- 3.0% Asian/Pacific Islander/Filipino
- 2.8% White
- 0.5% African American
- 0.1% Native American
- 0.5% Other

== Schools ==
=== Intermediate schools ===
Santa Ana Unified School District Intermediate Schools is a school district that contains the following schools:

- Carr Intermediate School. The school is named after Gerald P. Carr, a former NASA astronaut, from Santa Ana, California.
- Lathrop Intermediate School. The school is named after Julia Lathrop, the first director of the newly created U.S. Children's Bureau from 1912 to 1921.
- MacArthur Fundamental Intermediate. The school is named after Douglas MacArthur, former Chief of Staff of the United States Army.
- McFadden Institute of Technology
- Mendez Fundamental Intermediate School. The school is named after Gonzalo Mendez & Felicitas Mendez, a Latino activist couple.
- Sierra Intermediate School
- Spurgeon Intermediate School
- Villa Fundamental Intermediate School
- Willard Intermediate School. The school is named after Frances E. Willard, an American educator, temperance reformer, and women's suffragist.

=== High schools ===
- Century High School
- Cesar E. Chavez High School is a continuation school in Santa Ana, California. In 2004, the school was granted a six-year accreditation by the Western Association of Schools and Colleges (WASC). In 2005, the school was selected as a model continuation School by State Superintendent of Public Instruction Jack O’Connell, among other schools .
- Hector Godinez Fundamental High School is a public high school in Santa Ana, California. The school opened in 2007.The school was named in honor of Orange County's first Latino postmaster, Hector Godinez (1924–1999).

Godinez Fundamental High School

Location
- 3002 W Centennial Rd; Santa Ana, California; United States; 33°43′22.7″N 117°54′36.4″W

Information
- Type: Public
- Established: 2007
- Enrollment: 1,792 (2023–2024)
- Student to teacher ratio: 20.21\
- Colors: Gold, black, and white
- Nickname: Grizzlies
- Website: www.godinez.sausd.us

- Lorin Griset Academy, is a continuation high school in Orange County, California.
  Lorin Griset Academy
  Location
  - 1915 W. McFadden Avenue; Santa Ana, California; United States
  Information
  - Type: Public
  - Established: 2006
  - Principal: Michael A. Parra
  - Grades: 9-12
  - Enrollment: 300 (2023–2024)
  - Mascot: Puma
  - Website: https://www.sausd.us/Domain/3533
- Middle College High School
- Saddleback High School
- Santa Ana High School
- Segerstrom High School
- Valley High School

=== Alternative Schools & Programs ===
- Community Day High School & Intermediate School
- Independent Study Program
- Mitchell Child Development Center
- Cal SAFE

== Transportation ==
In September 2021, the Orange County Transportation Authority (OCTA) launched the Youth Ride Free Pass, a pilot program allowing riders ages 6 to 18 to use county buses at no cost. The passes were available through local school districts and online, funded by Caltrans and the California Air Resources Board. Santa Ana Unified School District Superintendent Jerry Almendarez stated that the free rides would serve as “a vital resource for our families,” assisting students who rely on buses to travel to and from school.

== See also ==
- List of school districts in Orange County, California
