= Santa Ana, California =

- City
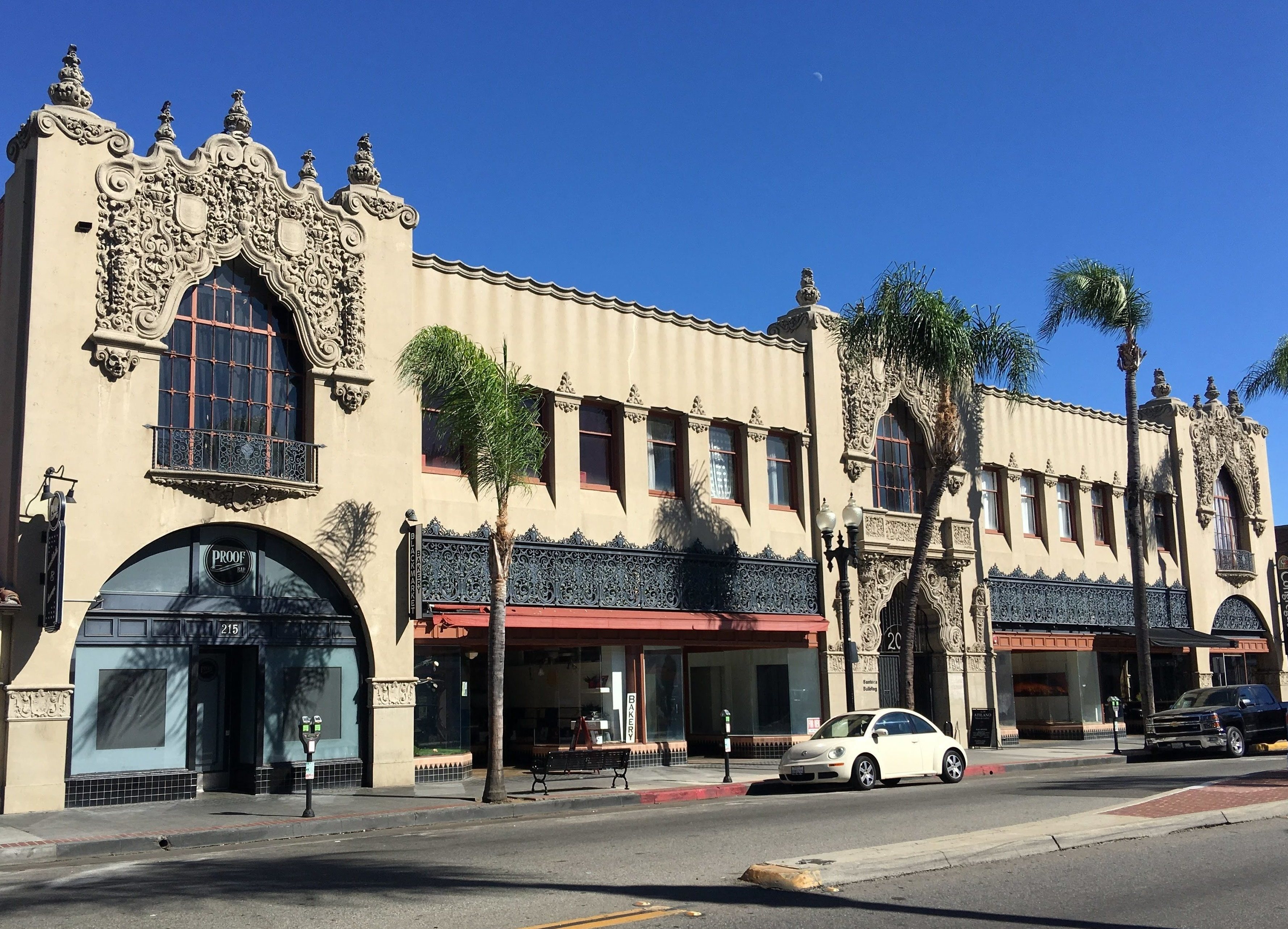
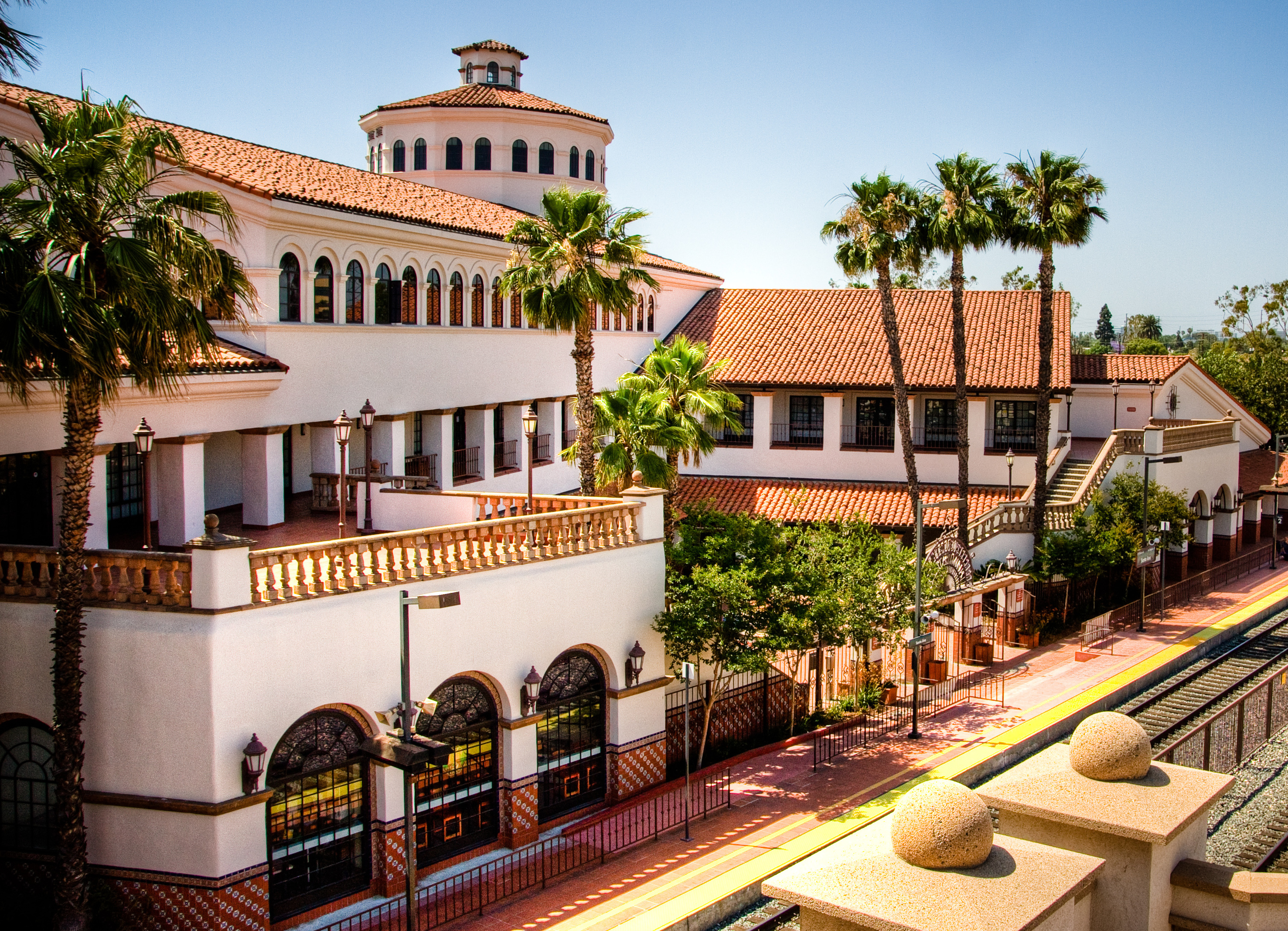
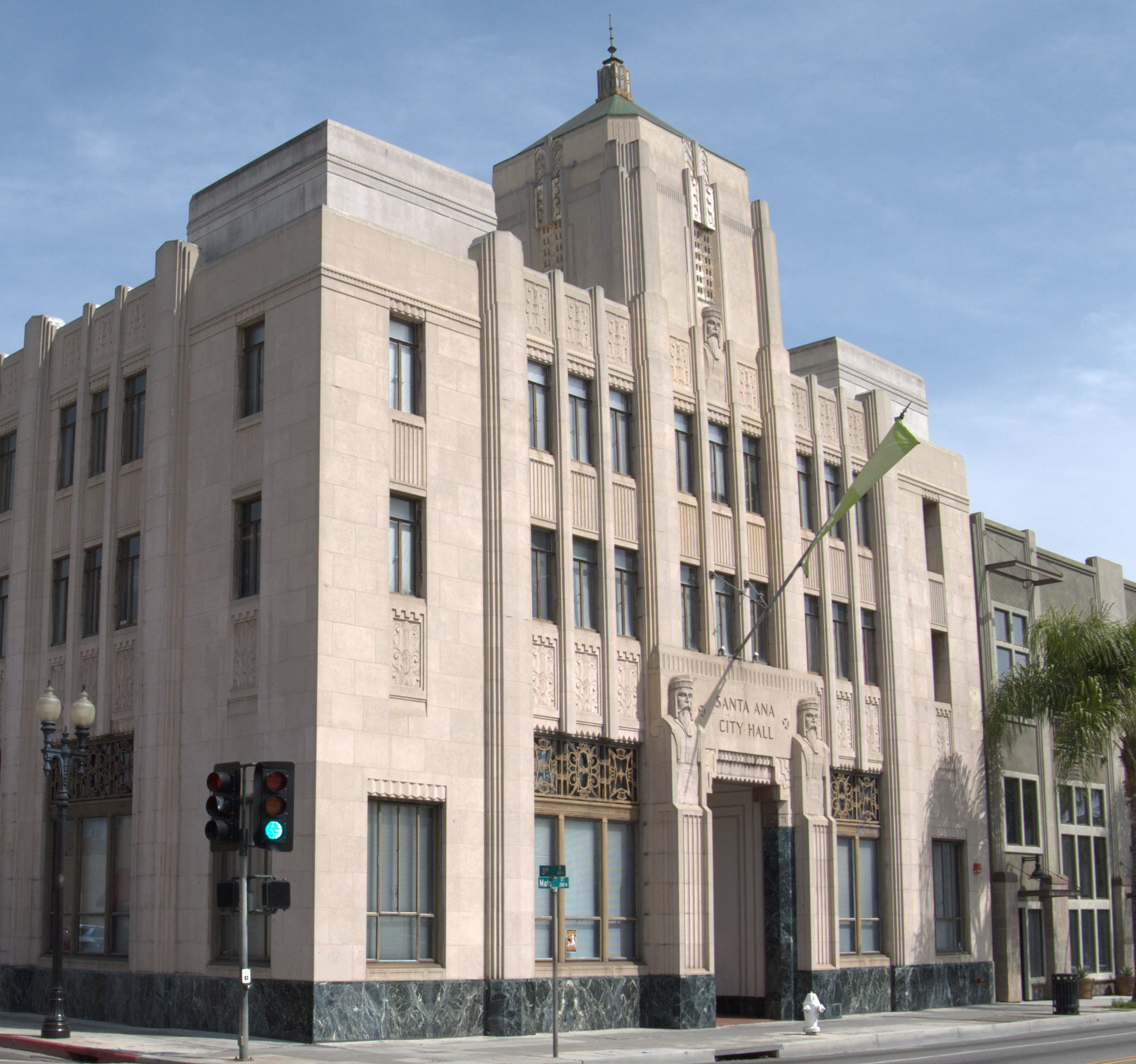
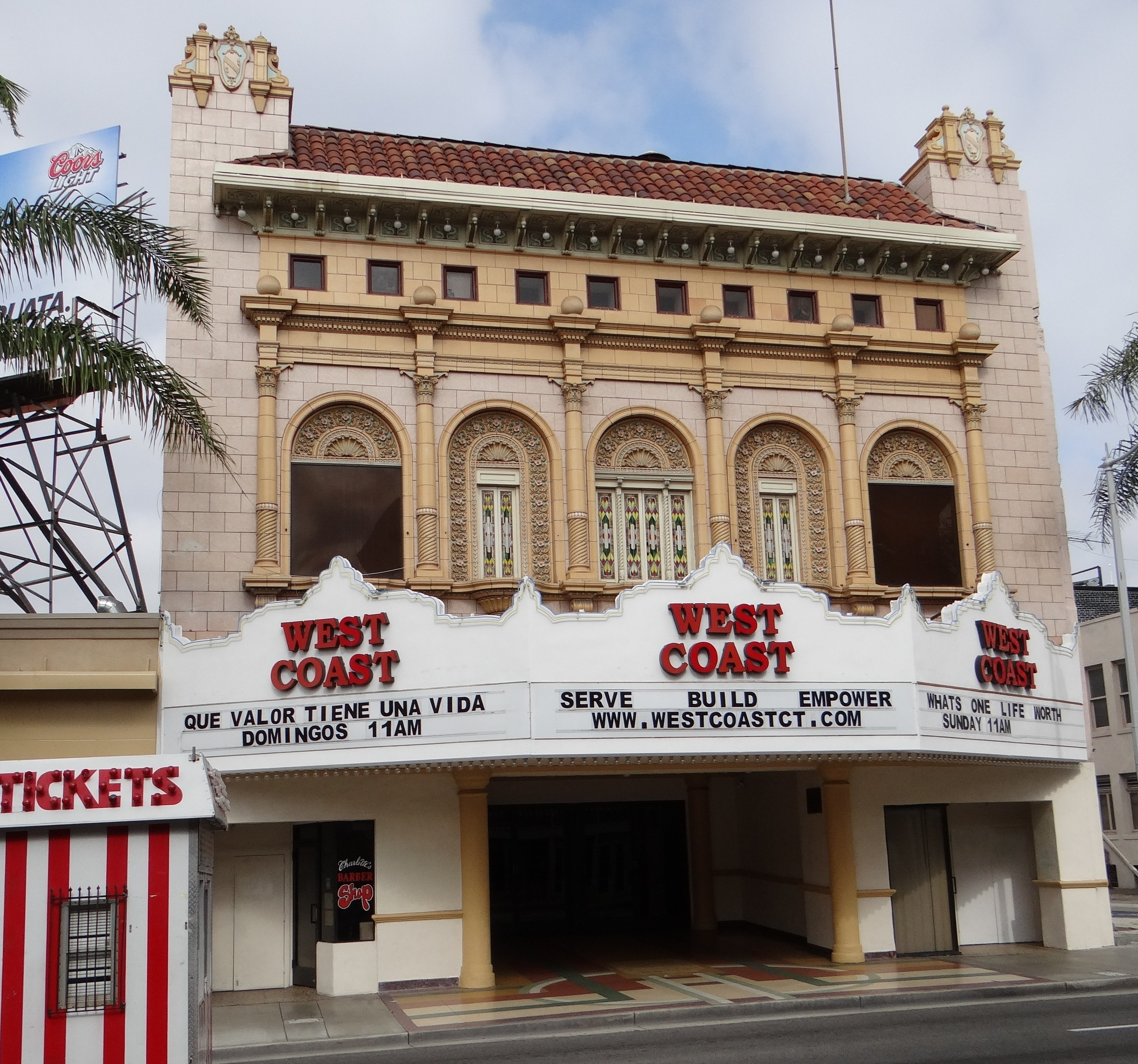
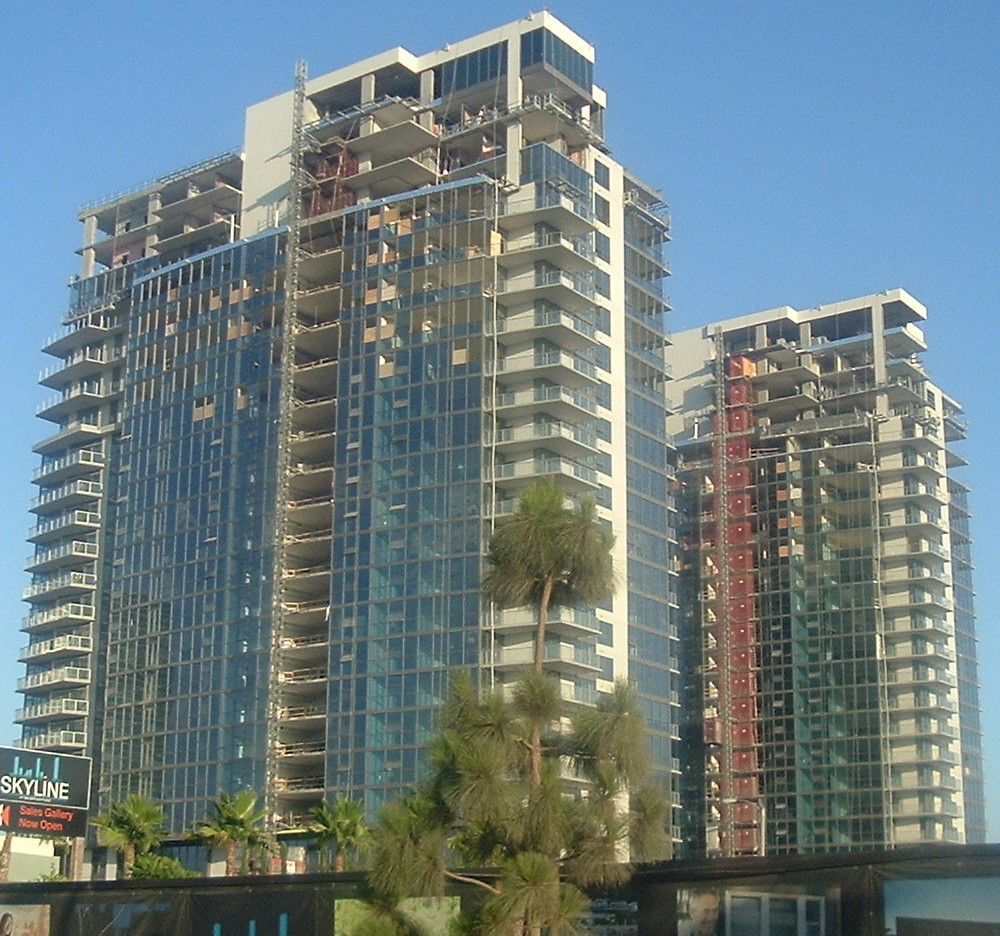
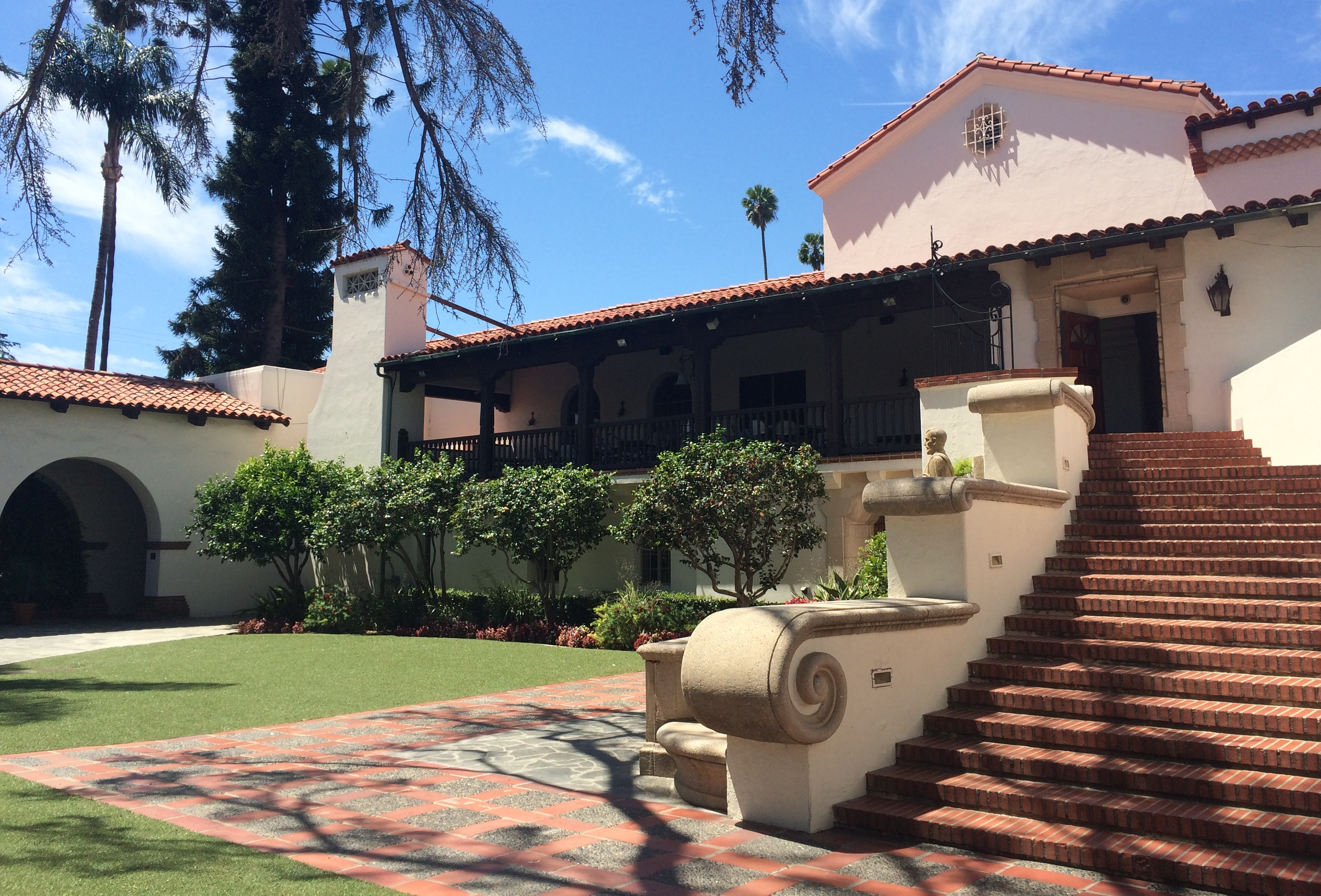
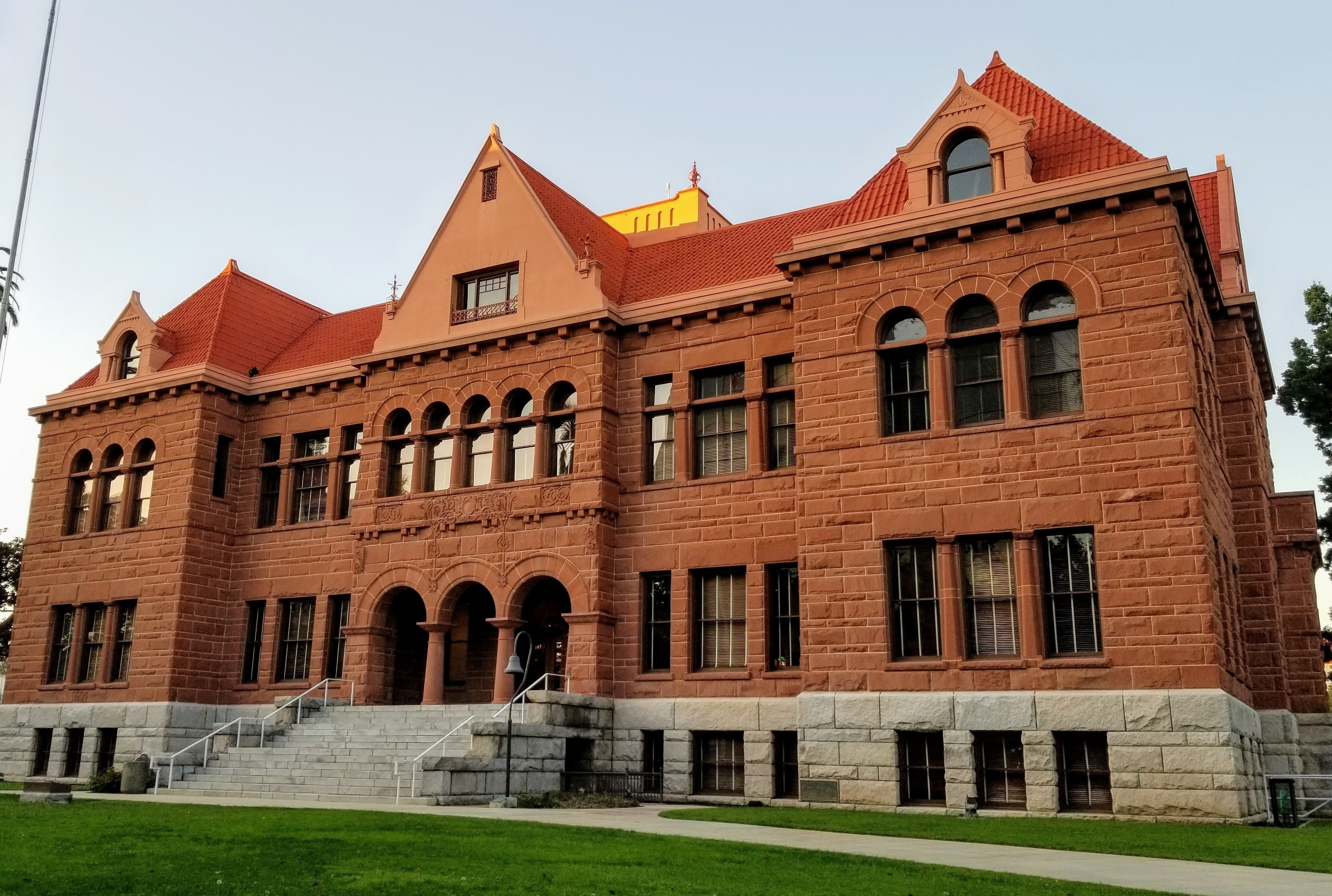
- Top: Santora Building (left) and Santa Ana Regional Transportation Center (right); middle: Santa Ana City Hall (left), West Coast Theatre (center), and high rises (right); bottom: Bowers Museum (left) and Old Santa Ana Courthouse

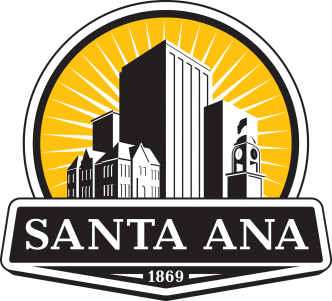
- Flag Seal Logo
- Motto: Education First
- Interactive map of Santa Ana, California
- Location in the Los Angeles Metropolitan Area Location in California Location in the United States Location in North America
- Coordinates: 33°44′27″N 117°52′53″W
- Country: United States
- State: California
- County: Orange
- Founded: 1869
- Incorporated: June 1, 1886
- Named for: Saint Anne

Government
  - Mayor: Valerie Amezcua
  - City manager: Alvaro Nuñez

Area
  - Total: 27.37 sq mi (70.89 km^{2})
  - Land: 27.34 sq mi (70.81 km^{2})
  - Water: 0.031 sq mi (0.08 km^{2}) 0.90%
- Elevation: 115 ft (35 m)

Population (2020)
  - Total: 310,227
  - Estimate (2025): 315,586 ▲
  - Rank: (2025); 3rd in Orange County; 14th in California; 65th in the United States
  - Density: 11,350/sq mi (4,381/km^{2})
- Demonyms: Santanero (Spanish colloquial); Santanera (Spanish colloquial)
- Time zone: UTC−8 (Pacific)
  - Summer (DST): UTC−7 (PDT)
- ZIP Codes: 92701–92708, 92711, 92712, 92728, 92735, 92799
- Area code: 657/714, 949
- FIPS code: 06-69000
- GNIS feature IDs: 1652790,2411814
- Website: santa-ana.gov

Santa Ana (Spanish for 'Saint Anne') is a city in and the county seat of Orange County, California, United States. Located in the Greater Los Angeles region of Southern California, the city's population was 310,227 at the 2020 census. As of 2023, Santa Ana is the third most populous city in Orange County (after Anaheim and Irvine), the 14th-most populous city in California, and the 65th most populous city in the United States. Santa Ana is a major regional economic and cultural hub for the Orange Coast.

In 1810, the Spanish governor of California granted Rancho Santiago de Santa Ana to José Antonio Yorba. Following the Mexican War of Independence, the Yorba family rancho was enlarged, becoming one of the largest and most valuable in the region and home to a diverse Californio community. Following the American Conquest of California, the rancho was sold to the Sepúlveda family, who subsequently lost their land claim. In 1869, William H. Spurgeon then purchased the rancho and formally founded the modern city of Santa Ana.

Approximately four-fifths Hispanic or Latino, Santa Ana has been characterized by The New York Times as the "face of a new California, a state where Latinos have more influence in everyday life—electorally, culturally and demographically—than almost anywhere else in the country."

== History ==
Members of the Tongva and Juaneño/Luiseño are indigenous to the area. The Tongva called the Santa Ana area "Hotuuk". The village of Pajbenga was located at modern day Santa Ana along the Santa Ana River. The Santa Ana river was a source for many of the Tongva villages and the Spanish Portola Expedition stayed and named this river.

=== Spanish and Mexican eras ===
After the 1769 expedition of Gaspar de Portolá out of Mexico City, then capital of New Spain, Friar Junípero Serra named the area Vallejo de Santa Ana (Valley of Saint Anne, or Santa Ana Valley). On November 1, 1776, Mission San Juan Capistrano was established within this valley.

In 1810, the first year of the Mexican War of Independence, Jose Antonio Yorba, a sergeant of the Spanish army, was granted land that he called Rancho Santiago de Santa Ana. Yorba's rancho included the lands where the cities of Olive, Orange, Irvine, Yorba Linda, Villa Park, Santa Ana, Tustin, Costa Mesa and unincorporated El Modena, and Santa Ana Heights, are today. This rancho was the only land grant in Orange County granted under Spanish Rule. Surrounding land grants in Orange County were granted after Mexican Independence by the new government.

After the Mexican-American War ended in 1848, Alta California became part of the United States and American settlers arrived in this area.

=== Post-Conquest era ===
Santa Ana was listed as a township of Los Angeles County in the 1860 and 1870 census, with an area encompassing most of what is now northern and central Orange County. It had a population of 756 in 1860 and 880 in 1870. The Anaheim district was enumerated separately from Santa Ana in 1870.

Claimed in 1869 by Kentuckian William H. Spurgeon on land obtained from the descendants of Jose Antonio Yorba, Santa Ana was incorporated as a city in 1886 with a population of 2000 and in 1889 became the seat of the newly formed Orange County.

In 1877, the Southern Pacific Railroad built a branch line from Los Angeles to Santa Ana, which offered free right of way, land for a depot, and $10,000 in cash to the railroad in exchange for terminating the line in Santa Ana and not neighboring Tustin. In 1887, the California Central Railway (which became a subsidiary of the Atchison, Topeka and Santa Fe Railway the following year) broke the Southern Pacific's local monopoly on rail travel, offering service between Los Angeles and San Diego by way of Santa Ana as a major intermediate station.

In 1890, whites made up 71 percent of the city's population, most of whom migrated to Santa Ana from confederate states following the American Civil War in search of real estate ventures and other economic opportunities.

=== 20th century ===
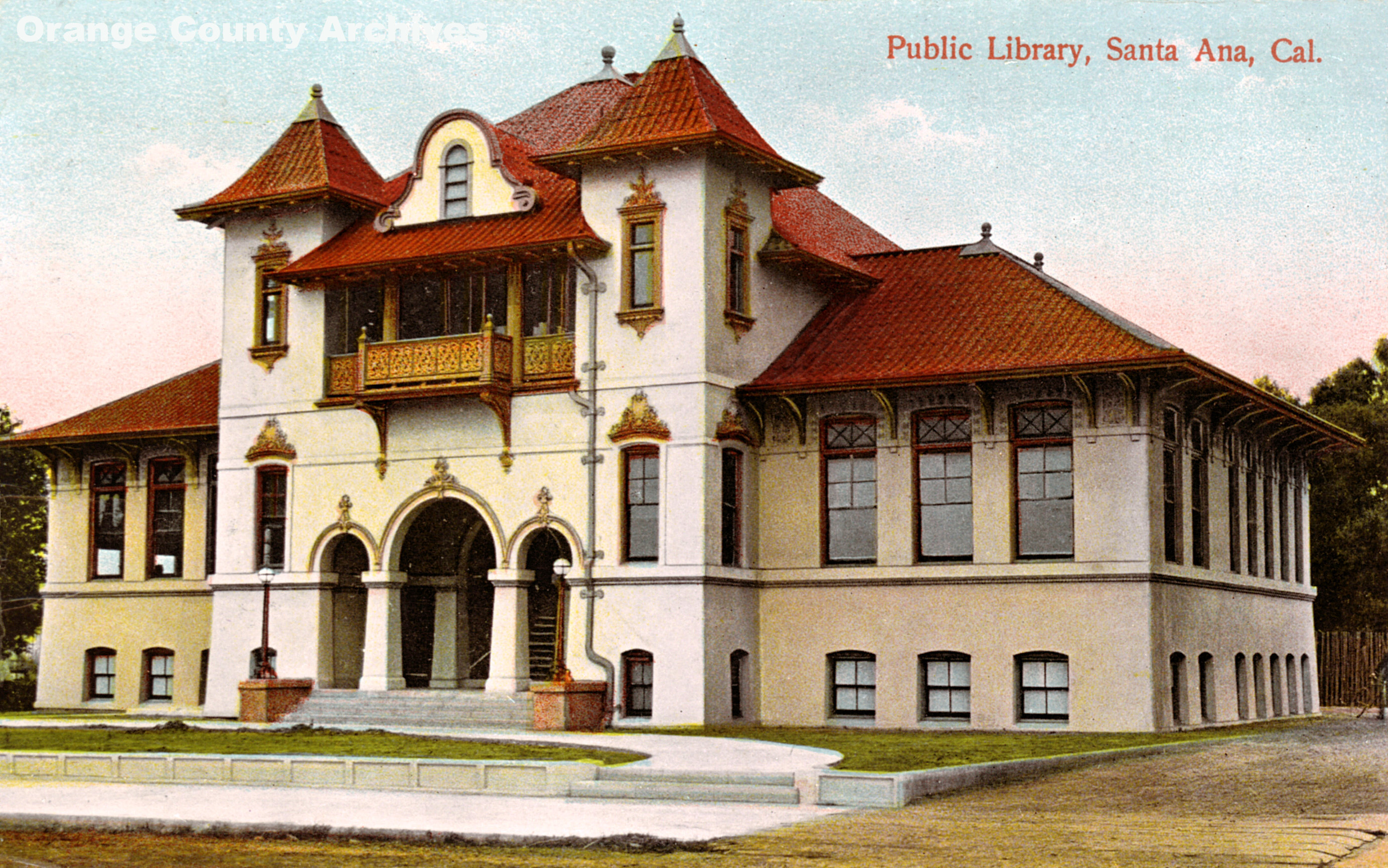
The original Mission Revival style Santa Ana Public Library, built 1901–05

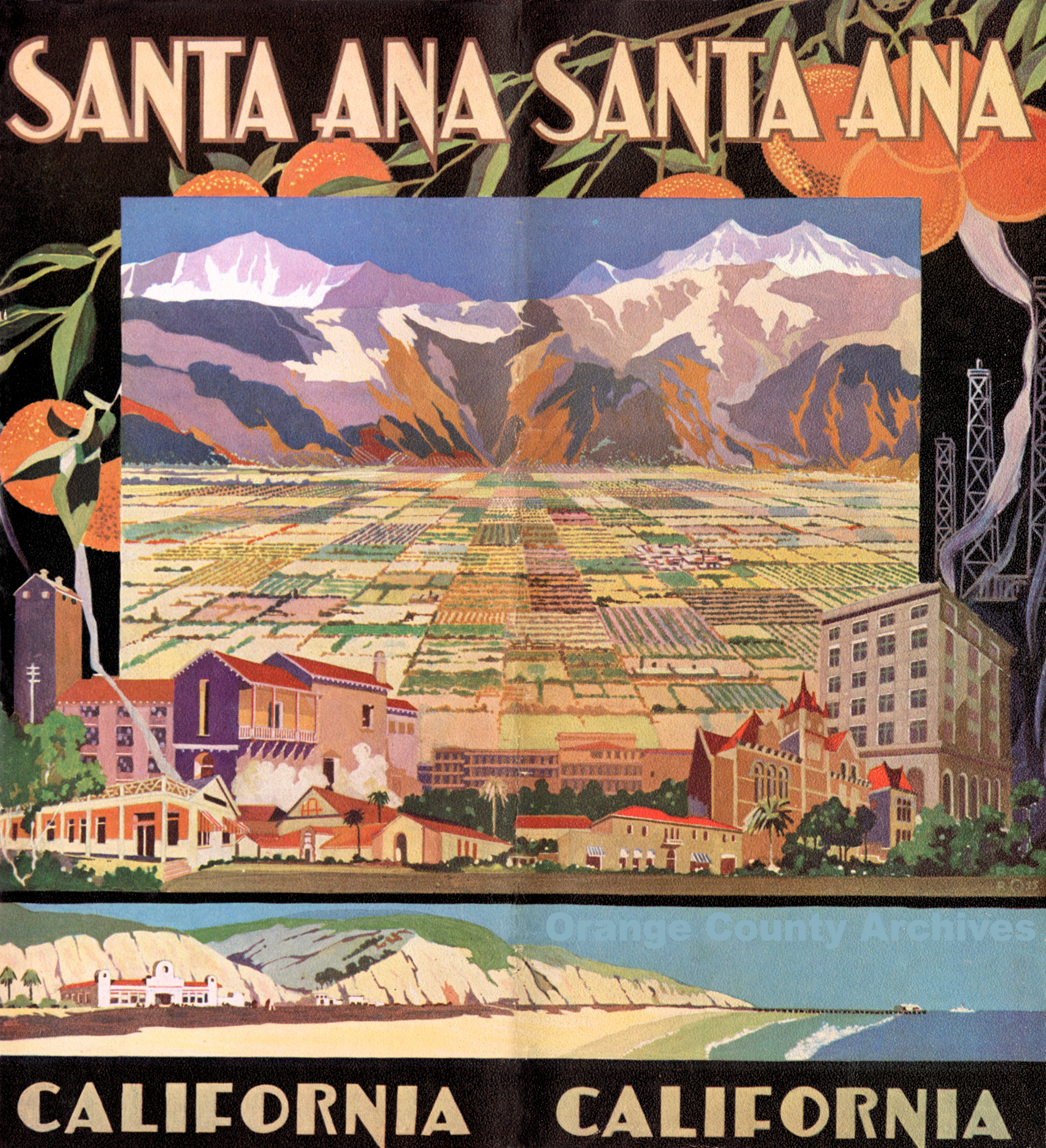
A city poster, c. 1932

By 1905, the Los Angeles Interurban Railway, a predecessor to the Pacific Electric Railway, extended from Los Angeles to Santa Ana, running along Fourth Street downtown. Firestone Boulevard, the first direct automobile route between Los Angeles and Santa Ana, opened in 1935; it was enlarged into the Santa Ana Freeway in 1953. The Pacific Electric Santa Ana Line ran from 1905 to 1958.

Santa Ana was the home of the original Glenn L. Martin aviation company, founded in 1912 before merging with the Wright Company in 1916. Later, Glenn Luther Martin created a second company of the same name in Cleveland, Ohio which eventually merged with the Lockheed Corporation to form the largest defense contractor in the world, Lockheed Martin.

Although there was a significant wave of Mexican migration to the city following the 1910 Mexican Revolution, the city remained majority white in 1939.

During World War II, the Santa Ana Army Air Base was built as a training center for the United States Army Air Forces. The base was responsible for continued population growth in Santa Ana and the rest of Orange County as many veterans moved to the area to raise families after the end of the war.

Santa Ana was at the center of Orange County's economic boom in the 1950s with its agricultural and defense industries. However, most of this prosperity was only experienced by the city's white residents, while Latinos did not similarly benefit. Instead, economic inequality between the two groups rapidly increased during this time.

In 1958, the Honer Plaza and Bullock's Fashion Square malls opened and would supplant Downtown Santa Ana, with its department stores such as Rankin's, Ward's, Penney's and Buffums. Fashion Square was completely renovated and became MainPlace Mall in 1987.

=== Latino city ===
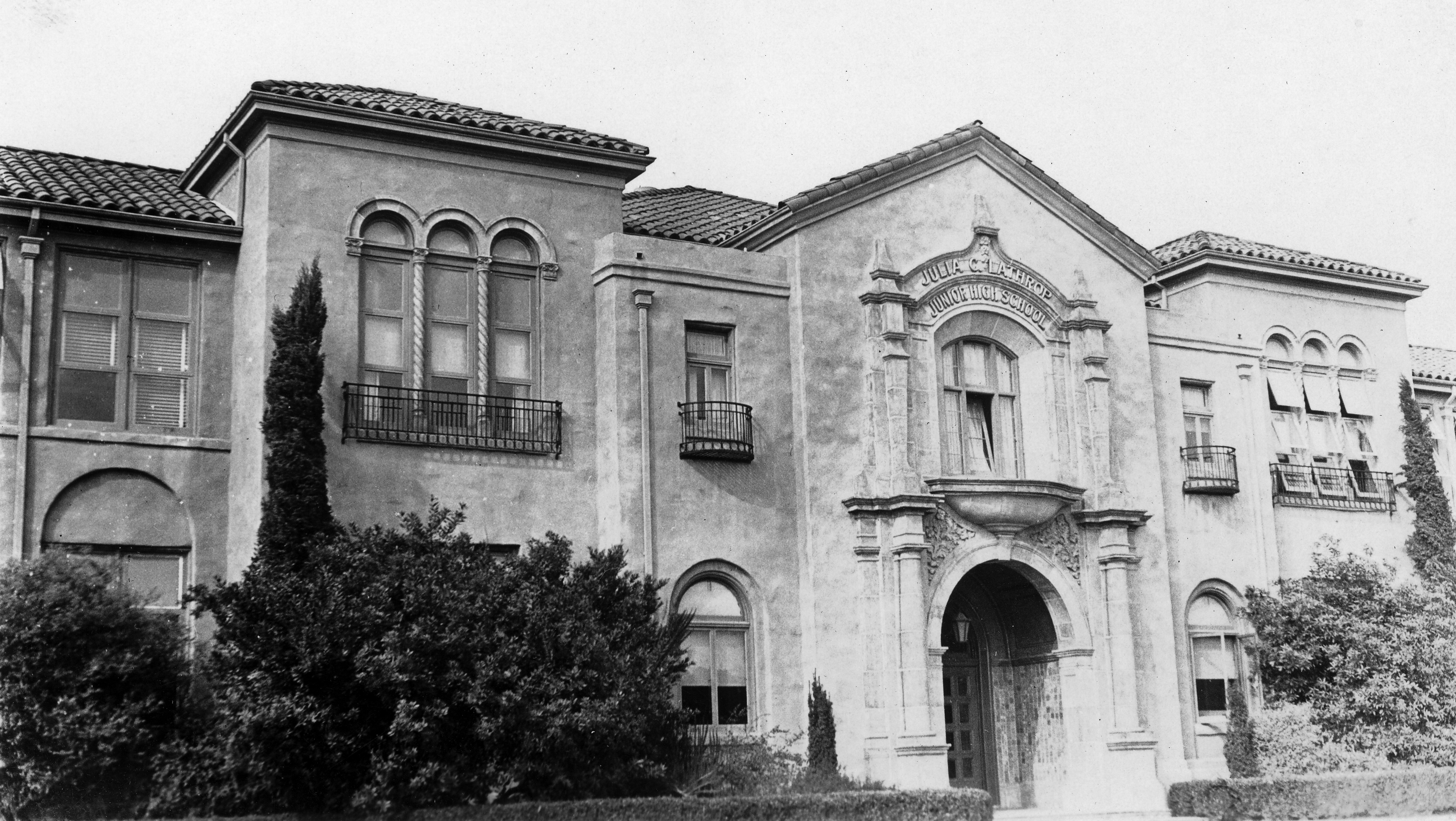
The Spanish Revival style Lathrop Jr. High School, demolished 1970

By the 1970s, Santa Ana was becoming an increasingly Latino city, with white flight to surrounding suburbs coinciding with the city's downtown becoming increasingly frequented by Latinos. This changed perceptions of the city and its economic value, with property values dropping significantly by 1974, while surrounding cities of Laguna Beach, Newport Beach, and Villa Park increased in value.

Santa Ana entered the 1980s as a city of equal numbers of whites and Latinos. What had been the white commercial center of the city, Fourth Street, was now a street of Latino businesses and character. Latino immigrant and working-class families could now be found in every neighborhood of the city, rather than in just a few ethnic enclaves, as they were previously. Santa Ana became more often referred to as Santana and Fourth Street as La Cuatro.

Having been a charter city since November 11, 1952, the citizens of Santa Ana amended the charter in November 1988 to provide for the direct election of the Mayor who until that point had been appointed from the council membership. Miguel A. Pulido was the first mayor of Latino descent in the city's history and the first Mayor directly elected by the voters.

Since the 1980s, Santa Ana has been characterized by an effort to revitalize the downtown area which had declined in influence, even as it had become a dynamic commercial and entertainment center for working-class Latinos. The Santa Ana Artist's Village was created around Cal State Fullerton's Grand Central Art Center to attract artists and young professionals to live-work lofts and new businesses. The process continued into 2009 with the reopening of the historic Yost Theater.

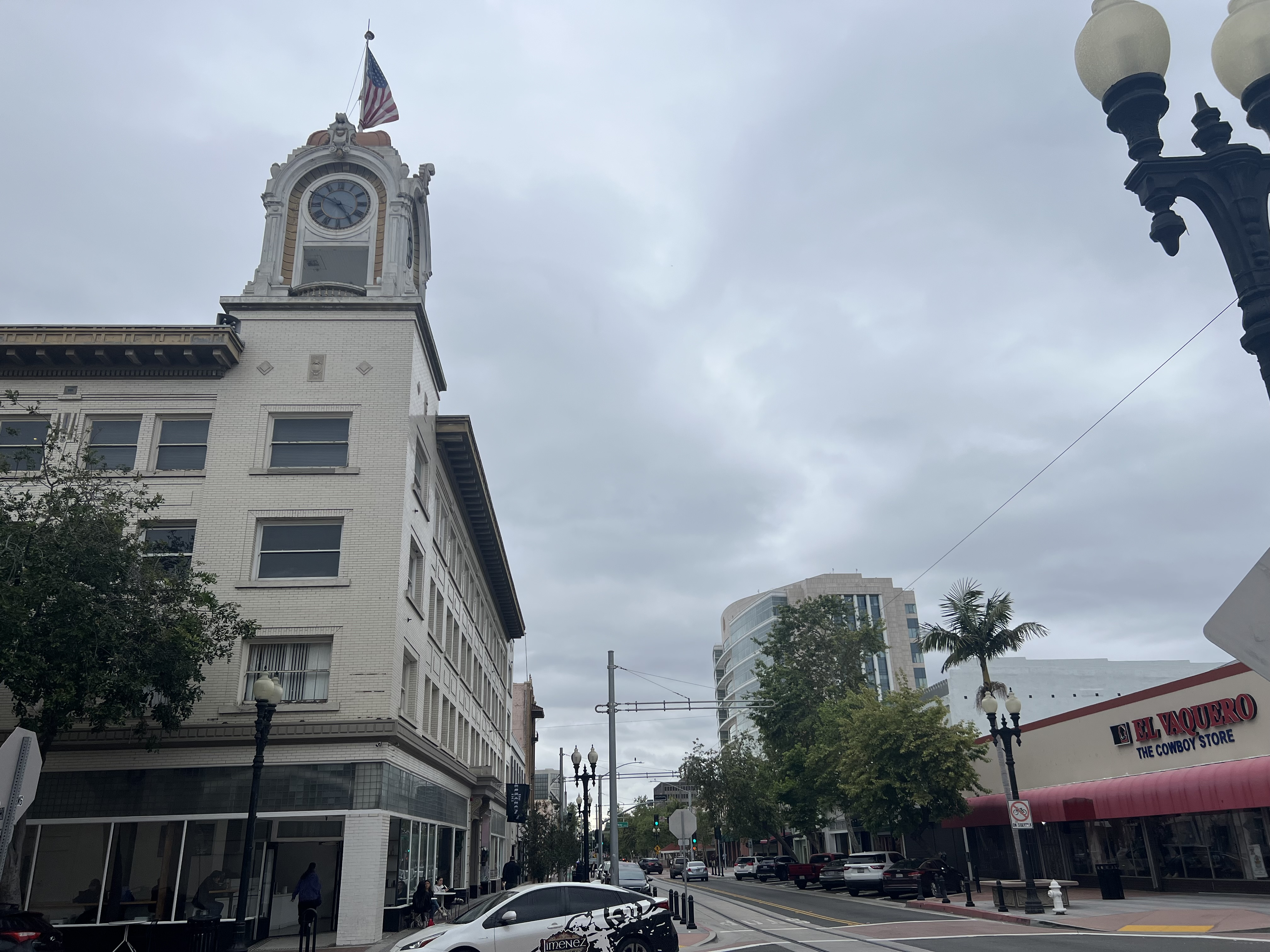
Downtown Santa Ana (2025)

In the 2010s, gentrification became a larger concern of Santa Ana residents, with its roots starting in the 1990s. Despite strong Latino political representation, gentrification efforts have increasingly displaced the Mexican immigrant presence in the downtown area of the city in favor of outsiders. Primarily Spanish-speaking businesses that served immigrant populations have been demolished in favor of arts projects to draw in outside investment, which bring clientele who further question why Spanish-speaking businesses are present, leading to a cycle of displacement.

Residents formed a social movement to address lead concentrations in lower-income areas of the city. A 2020 study found that areas of Santa Ana with a median income below $50,000 had five times higher lead concentrations than higher-income areas of the city, which is particularly a concern for children. Residents continue to advocate for environmental justice in the city.

== Geography ==
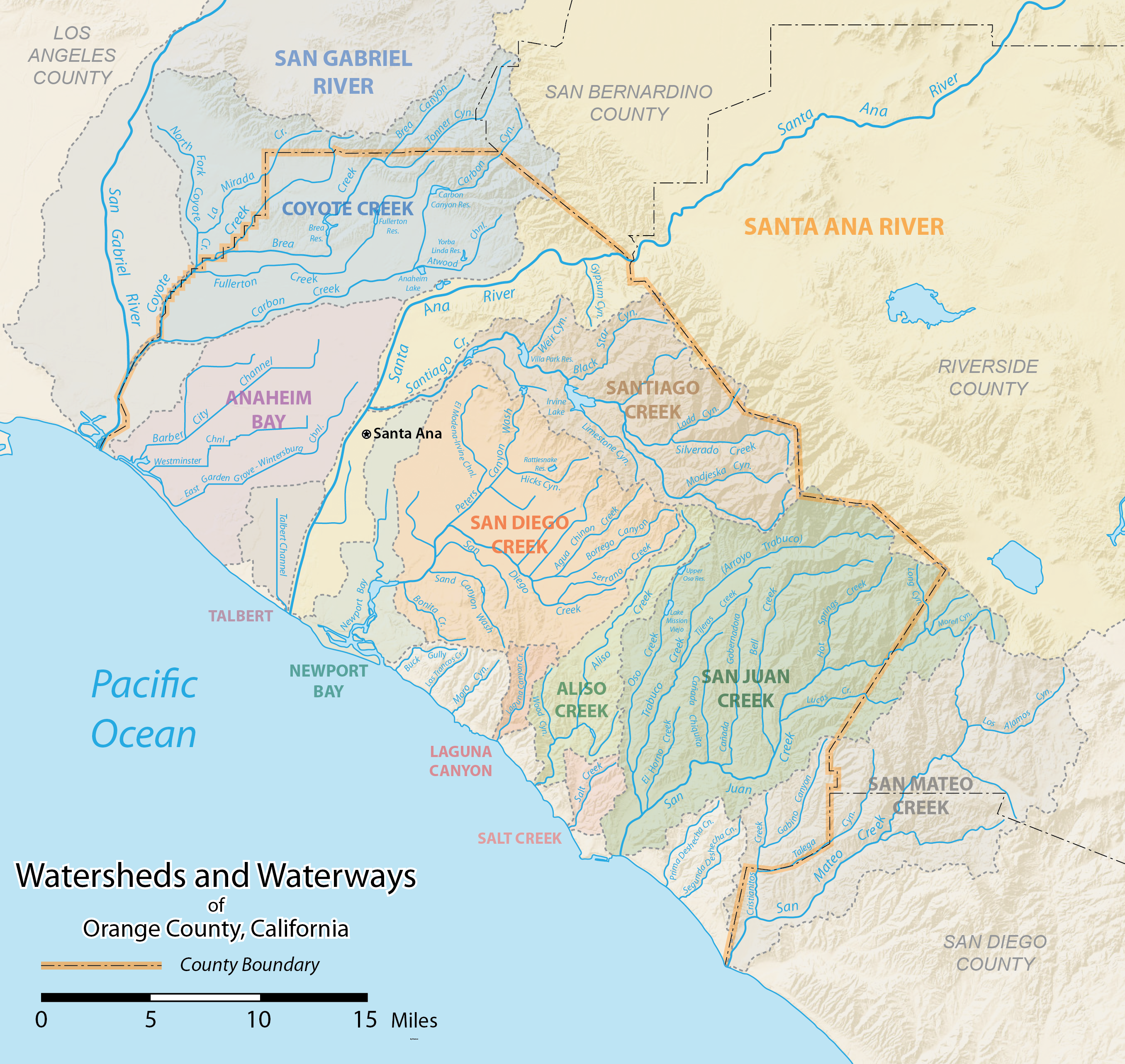
Santa Ana's location within the Orange County watershed

Santa Ana is nested on flat, low-lying plains with little land elevation change. Running through the west end of the city is the mostly channelized Santa Ana River, which is also largely seasonal due to the construction of the Prado Dam and Seven Oaks Dam. The river caused several severe floods in the 20th century, and is a continued threat despite the existence of the dams.

=== Cityscape ===
Now fully developed, Santa Ana has several distinct districts. The core of the city is the downtown area, which contains both retail and housing, as well as the Santa Ana Civic Center, which is a dense campus of administrative buildings for both the city and the county of Orange. The civic center is also home to the Ronald Reagan Federal Building and Courthouse. Several historic homes dating from the late 1800s can be found as well, and their preservation is a key issue as development of the downtown area continues.

North of downtown is the "Midtown" district along Main St., home to entertainment destinations such as the Bowers Museum, MainPlace Mall, and the Discovery Science Center.

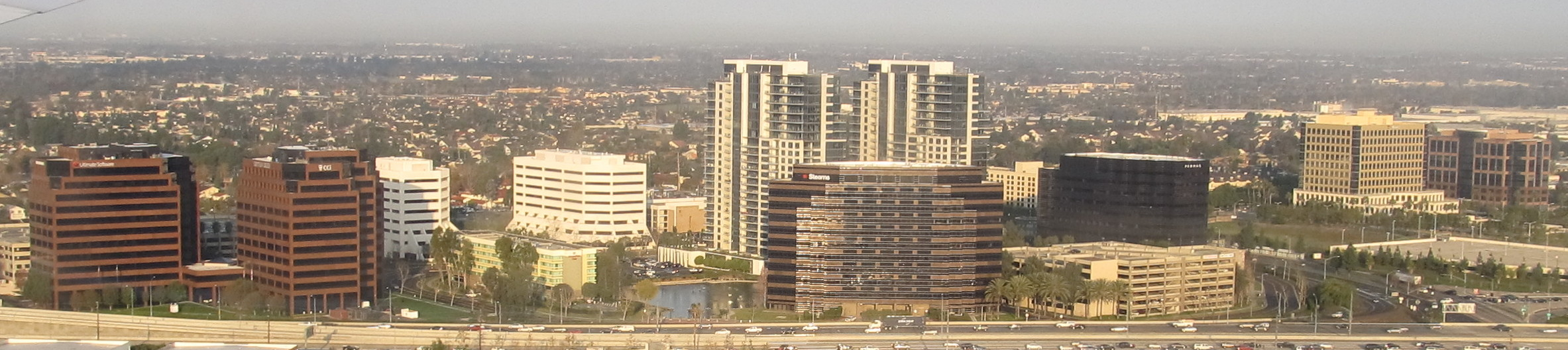
View of the skyline of the South Coast Metro district within Santa Ana

Near the intersection of the Santa Ana Freeway and the Costa Mesa Freeway is the newly designated "Metro East" area, which the city council has envisioned as a secondary mixed-use development district. Currently the area is occupied by several office towers, but little retail or housing. Also on the east side of the city is the Santa Ana Zoo, notable for its collection of monkeys and species from South and Central America.

The southeast end of the city is part of the South Coast Metro area, which is shared with the city of Costa Mesa. South Coast Plaza, a major shopping center, is the primary destination of this area, which also contains several high-rise office and apartment buildings. Yokohama Tire Corporation's United States headquarters are located at 1 MacArthur Place in the South Coast Metro area of Santa Ana, and Banc of California's headquarters relocated from the neighboring city of Irvine.

=== Biogeography ===
The most common native species: Hairy Sand Verbena, Red Sand Verbena, and Pink Sand Verbena.

=== Climate ===
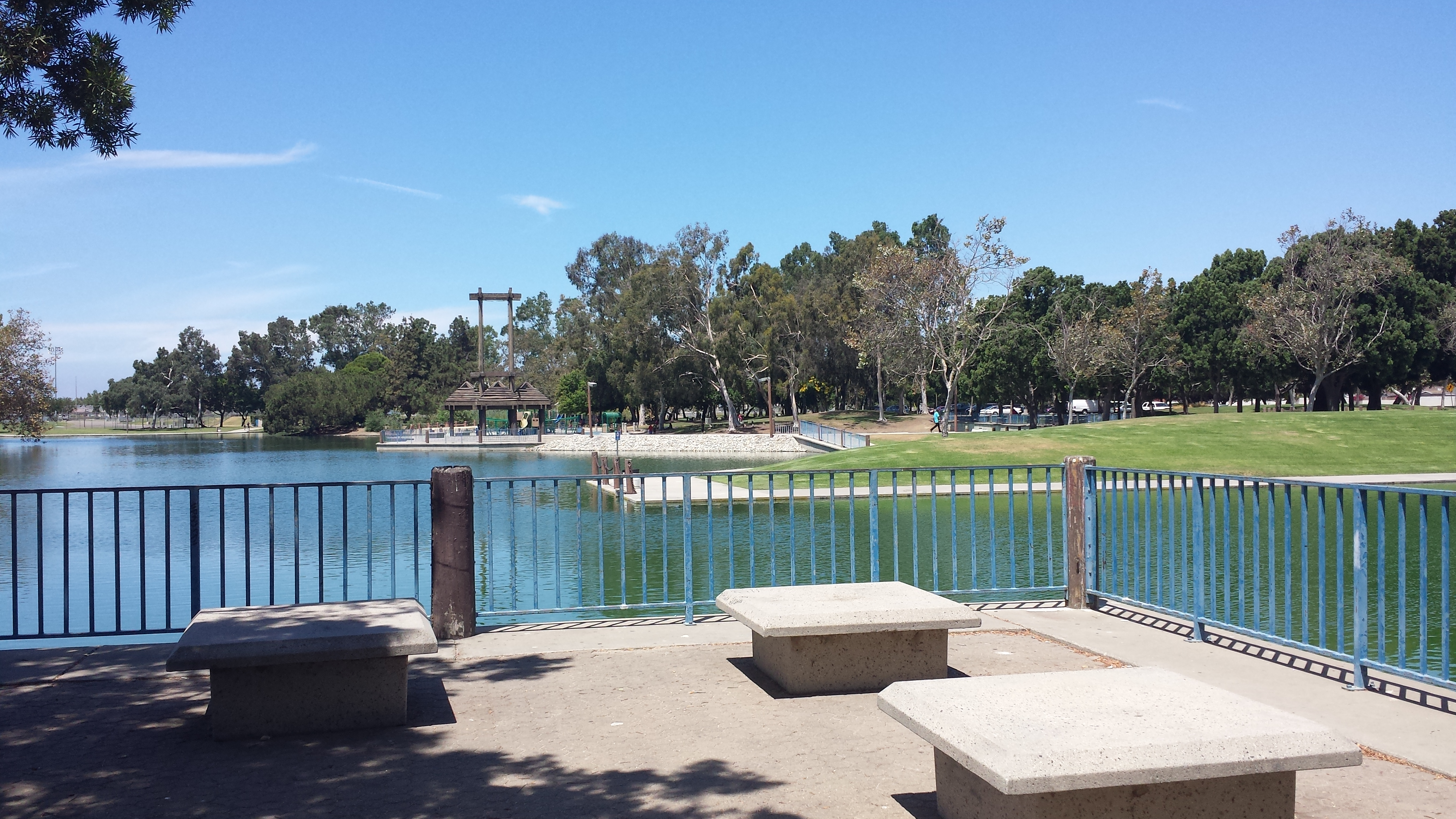
Centennial Regional Park

Santa Ana experiences a hot semi-arid climate (Köppen: BSh), with hot, dry summers and mild winters with moderate rainfall. Rainfall averages about 12.54 in (318.5 mm) per year, most of which falls from November through April. There are an average of 35 days with measurable precipitation annually.

The record high temperature for Santa Ana was 112 °F (44 °C) on June 14, 1917. The record low temperature was 16 °F (−9 °C) on January 12, 1989. There are an average of 30.1 days with highs of 90 °F (32 °C) or higher.

The wettest "rain year" in Santa Ana was from July 1940 to June 1941 with 34.34 inches (872.2 mm), and the driest was from July 2017 to June 2018 with a mere 2.73 inches (69.3 mm). The most rainfall in one month was 13.99 inches (355.3 mm) in February 1998. The most rainfall in 24 hours was 4.69 inches (119.1 mm) on February 16, 1927.

Santa Ana

Climate chart (precipitation, max. and min. temperature)
J	F	M	A	M	J	J	A	S	O	N	D
0.8 85 49	1.5 85 50	0.7 87 52	0.9 91 54	0 90 58	0 90 61	0 93 65	0 96 65	0 100 64	0 96 59	0 90 53	0 81 48
- █ Average max. and min. temperatures in °F
- █ Precipitation totals in inches
- Source: Weather Underground
Metric conversion
J	F	M	A	M	J	J	A	S	O	N	D
21 29 9	38 29 10	18 31 11	24 33 12	0 32 14	0 32 16	0 34 18	0 36 18	0 38 18	0 36 15	0 32 12	0 27 9
- █ Average max. and min. temperatures in °C
- █ Precipitation totals in mm

Climate data for Santa Ana, California (normals 1991–2020, extremes 1916–present)
Month	Jan	Feb	Mar	Apr	May	Jun	Jul	Aug	Sep	Oct	Nov	Dec	Year
Record high °F (°C)	96 (36)	95 (35)	98 (37)	104 (40)	105 (41)	112 (44)	110 (43)	106 (41)	111 (44)	106 (41)	101 (38)	95 (35)	112 (44)
Mean maximum °F (°C)	84.6 (29.2)	85.0 (29.4)	86.5 (30.3)	90.8 (32.7)	89.7 (32.1)	90.1 (32.3)	93.0 (33.9)	96.1 (35.6)	99.6 (37.6)	96.0 (35.6)	89.8 (32.1)	81.3 (27.4)	101.6 (38.7)
Mean daily maximum °F (°C)	69.3 (20.7)	69.3 (20.7)	71.2 (21.8)	73.2 (22.9)	74.7 (23.7)	77.7 (25.4)	82.5 (28.1)	84.6 (29.2)	83.8 (28.8)	79.4 (26.3)	74.0 (23.3)	68.4 (20.2)	75.7 (24.3)
Daily mean °F (°C)	59.0 (15.0)	59.4 (15.2)	61.5 (16.4)	63.7 (17.6)	66.4 (19.1)	69.5 (20.8)	73.6 (23.1)	75.0 (23.9)	73.8 (23.2)	69.4 (20.8)	63.4 (17.4)	58.2 (14.6)	66.1 (18.9)
Mean daily minimum °F (°C)	48.7 (9.3)	49.5 (9.7)	51.8 (11.0)	54.2 (12.3)	58.1 (14.5)	61.3 (16.3)	64.7 (18.2)	65.3 (18.5)	63.9 (17.7)	59.4 (15.2)	52.8 (11.6)	48.1 (8.9)	56.5 (13.6)
Mean minimum °F (°C)	39.5 (4.2)	40.7 (4.8)	42.8 (6.0)	46.0 (7.8)	51.5 (10.8)	55.2 (12.9)	59.2 (15.1)	59.7 (15.4)	57.2 (14.0)	53.5 (11.9)	43.6 (6.4)	38.5 (3.6)	36.7 (2.6)
Record low °F (°C)	16 (−9)	22 (−6)	28 (−2)	31 (−1)	35 (2)	39 (4)	42 (6)	45 (7)	40 (4)	34 (1)	24 (−4)	22 (−6)	16 (−9)
Average precipitation inches (mm)	2.88 (73)	3.16 (80)	1.71 (43)	0.82 (21)	0.29 (7.4)	0.08 (2.0)	0.03 (0.76)	0.00 (0.00)	0.12 (3.0)	0.50 (13)	0.79 (20)	2.16 (55)	12.54 (319)
Average precipitation days (≥ 0.01 in.)	6.3	6.6	4.9	2.9	1.7	0.6	0.5	0.1	0.6	2.1	2.8	5.9	35.0
Source: NOAA

== Demographics ==
Historical population
Census	Pop.	Note	%±
1880	711		—
1890	3,628		410.3%
1900	4,933		36.0%
1910	8,429		70.9%
1920	15,485		83.7%
1930	30,322		95.8%
1940	31,921		5.3%
1950	45,533		42.6%
1960	100,350		120.4%
1970	155,710		55.2%
1980	204,023		31.0%
1990	293,742		44.0%
2000	337,977		15.1%
2010	324,528		−4.0%
2020	310,227		−4.4%
2025 (est.)	315,586	▲	1.7%
U.S. Decennial Census; 1860–1870 1880–1890; 1900 1910 1920; 1930 1940 1950; 1960 1970 1980; 1990 2000 2010; 2020

Santa Ana first appeared in the 1880 United States census with a population of 711 as part of Santa Ana Township (pop 3,024 in 1880).

Santa Ana, California – racial and ethnic composition Note: the US Census treats Hispanic/Latino as an ethnic category. This table excludes Latinos from the racial categories and assigns them to a separate category. Hispanics/Latinos may be of any race.
Race / ethnicity (NH = Non-Hispanic)	Pop 1980	Pop 1990	Pop. 2000	Pop. 2010	Pop. 2020	% 1980	% 1990	% 2000	% 2010	% 2020
White alone (NH)	90,484	67,897	41,984	29,950	26,428	44.42%	23.11%	12.42%	9.23%	8.52%
Black or African American alone (NH)	7,763	6,454	4,309	3,177	2,745	3.81%	2.20%	1.27%	0.98%	0.88%
Native American or Alaska Native alone (NH)	1,133	720	886	507	485	0.56%	0.25%	0.26%	0.16%	0.16%
Asian alone (NH)	13,090	26,867	29,412	33,618	37,440	6.43%	9.15%	8.70%	10.36%	12.07%
Native Hawaiian or Pacific Islander alone (NH)	13,090	26,867	993	826	635	6.43%	9.15%	0.29%	0.25%	0.20%
Other race alone (NH)	591	421	273	375	921	0.29%	0.14%	0.08%	0.12%	0.30%
Mixed race or Multiracial (NH)	x	x	3,023	2,147	3,541	x	x	0.89%	0.66%	1.14%
Hispanic or Latino (any race)	90,652	191,383	257,097	253,928	238,022	44.50%	65.15%	76.07%	78.25%	76.73%
Total	203,713	293,742	337,977	324,528	310,227	100.00%	100.00%	100.00%	100.00%	100.00%

=== 2020 ===
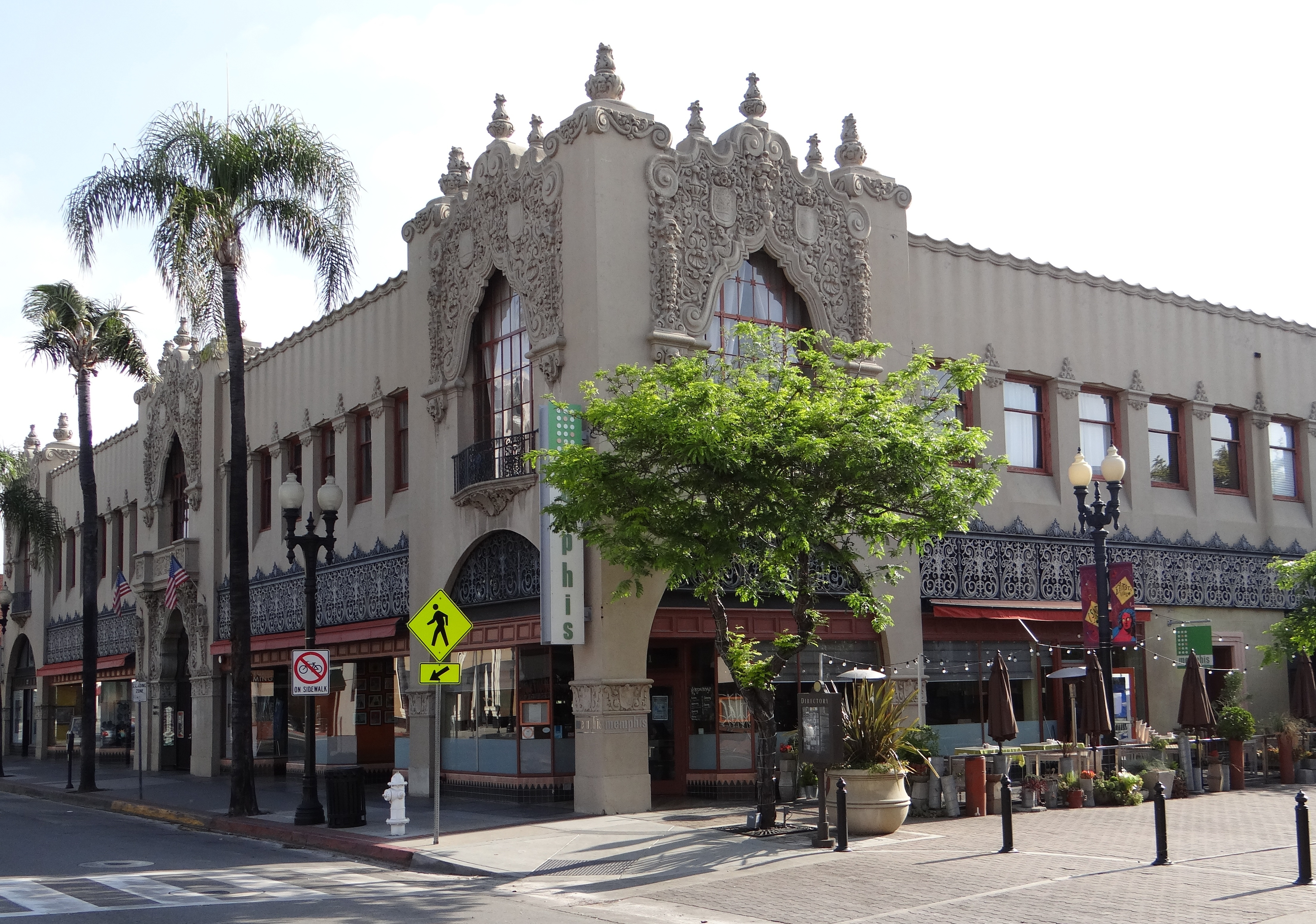
Historic California Churrigueresque style Santora Building

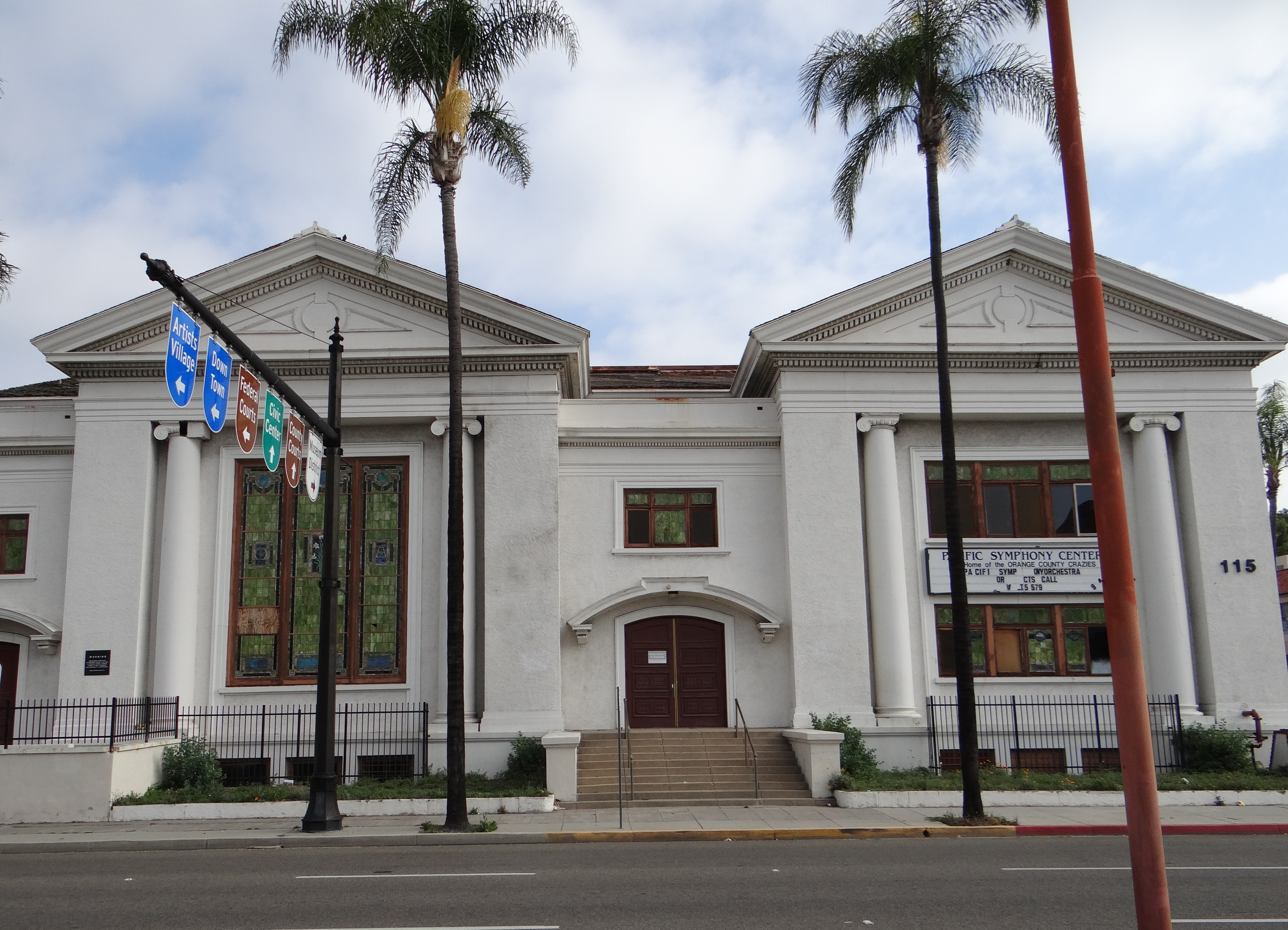
The Pacific Symphony Center

The 2020 United States census reported that Santa Ana had a population of 310,227. The population density was 11,347.4 inhabitants per square mile (4,381.3/km^{2}). The racial makeup was 18.5% White, 1.1% African American, 3.7% Native American, 12.3% Asian, 0.3% Pacific Islander, 45.1% from other races, and 19.1% from two or more races. Hispanic or Latino residents of any race were 76.7% of the population. The census reported that 98.3% of the population lived in households, 0.5% lived in non-institutionalized group quarters, and 1.2% were institutionalized.

There were 76,622 households, out of which 46.4% included children under the age of 18, 50.8% were married-couple households, 8.1% were cohabiting couple households, 24.5% had a female householder with no partner present, and 16.6% had a male householder with no partner present. 13.4% of households were one person, and 5.1% were one person aged 65 or older. The average household size was 3.98. There were 61,388 families (80.1% of all households).

The age distribution was 24.8% under the age of 18, 11.2% aged 18 to 24, 30.0% aged 25 to 44, 23.8% aged 45 to 64, and 10.2% who were 65 years of age or older. The median age was 33.5 years. For every 100 females, there were 102.4 males.

There were 79,181 housing units at an average density of 2,896.3 units per square mile (1,118.3 units/km^{2}), of which 76,622 (96.8%) were occupied. Of these, 45.6% were owner-occupied, and 54.4% were occupied by renters.

In 2023, the US Census Bureau estimated that the median household income was $88,354, and the per capita income was $28,859. About 8.8% of families and 11.1% of the population were below the poverty line.

=== Ethnicity ===
The most common Hispanic ancestries in Santa Ana are Mexican, Salvadorian and Guatemalan. The most common European ancestries are German, Irish, English and Italian. By the late 1970s, African-American families began to move out of Santa Ana.

=== 2010 ===
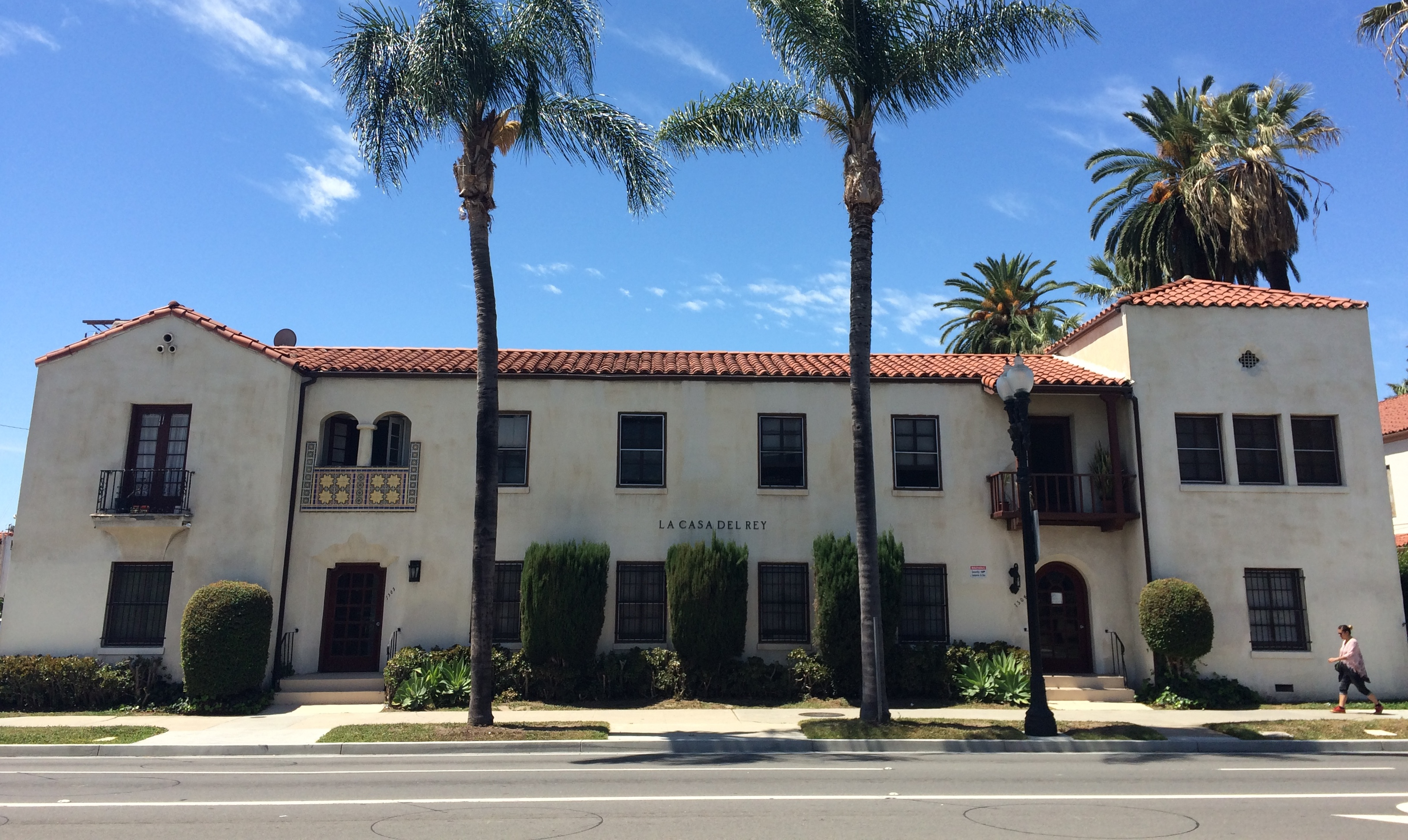
The historic Casa del Rey

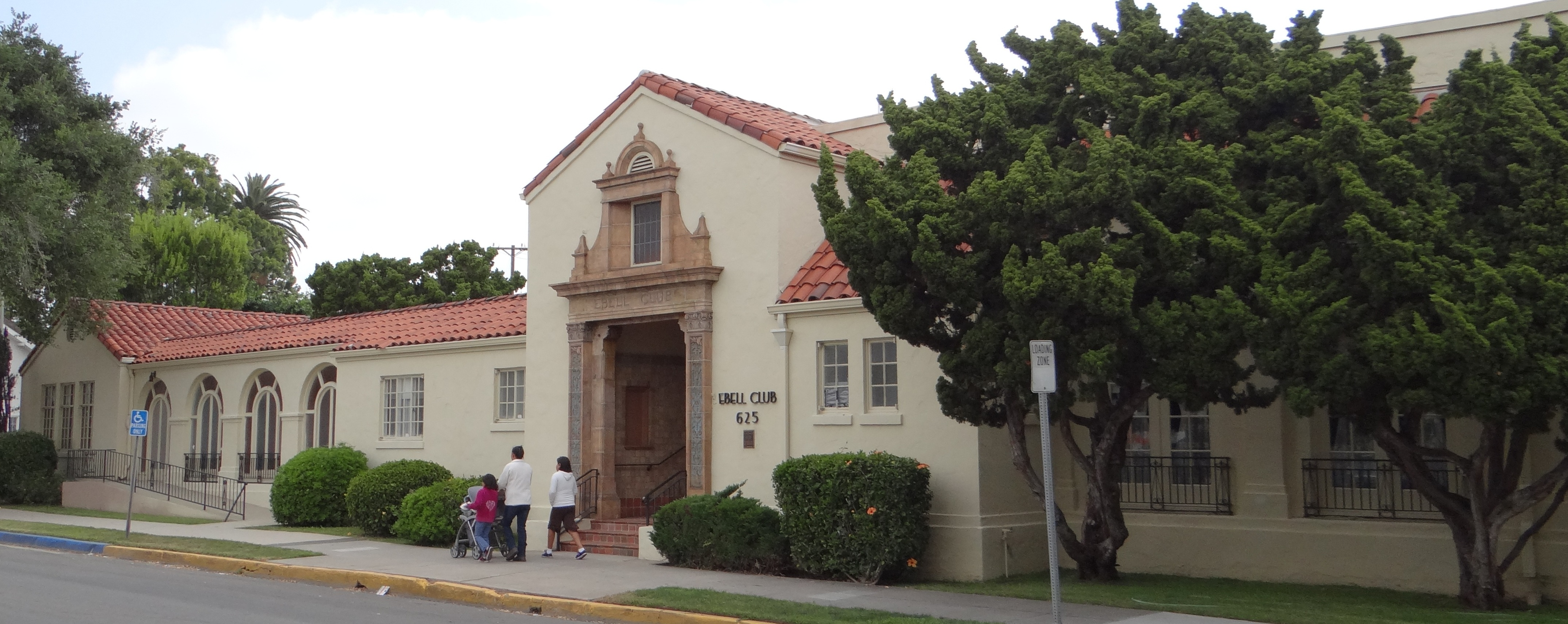
The Ebell Society of Santa Ana

The 2010 United States census reported that Santa Ana had a population of 324,528. The population density was 11,793.3 inhabitants per square mile (4,553.4/km^{2}). The racial makeup of Santa Ana was 148,838 (45.9%) White (9.2% Non-Hispanic White), 4,856 (1.5%) African American, 3,260 (1.0%) Native American, 34,138 (10.5%) Asian, 976 (0.3%) Pacific Islander, 120,789 (37.2%) from other races, and 11,671 (3.6%) from two or more races. There were 253,928 Hispanic or Latino residents of any race (78.2%).

The census reported that 319,870 people (98.6% of the population) lived in households, 1,415 (0.4%) lived in non-institutionalized group quarters, and 3,243 (1.0%) were institutionalized.

There were 73,174 households, out of which 41,181 (56.3%) had children under the age of 18 living in them, 41,389 (56.6%) were opposite-sex married couples living together, 11,808 (16.1%) had a female householder with no husband present, 6,451 (8.8%) had a male householder with no wife present. There were 4,933 (6.7%) unmarried opposite-sex partnerships, and 556 (0.8%) same-sex married couples or partnerships. 9,254 households (12.6%) were made up of individuals, and 3,378 (4.6%) had someone living alone who was 65 years of age or older. The average household size was 4.37. There were 59,648 families (81.5% of all households); the average family size was 4.54.

The age distribution of the population was as follows: 99,678 people (30.7%) under the age of 18, 39,165 people (12.1%) aged 18 to 24, 102,399 people (31.6%) aged 25 to 44, 61,375 people (18.9%) aged 45 to 64, and 21,911 people (6.8%) who were 65 years of age or older. The median age was 29.1 years. For every 100 females, there were 104.4 males. For every 100 females age 18 and over, there were 104.6 males.

There were 76,896 dwelling units at an average density of 2,794.4 per square mile (1,078.9/km^{2}), of which 34,756 (47.5%) were owner-occupied, and 38,418 (52.5%) were occupied by renters. The homeowner vacancy rate was 1.9%; the rental vacancy rate was 4.9%. 154,045 people (47.5% of the population) lived in owner-occupied dwelling units and 165,825 people (51.1%) lived in rental dwelling units.

During 2009–2013, Santa Ana had a median household income of $53,335, with 21.5% of the population living below the federal poverty line.

== Economy ==
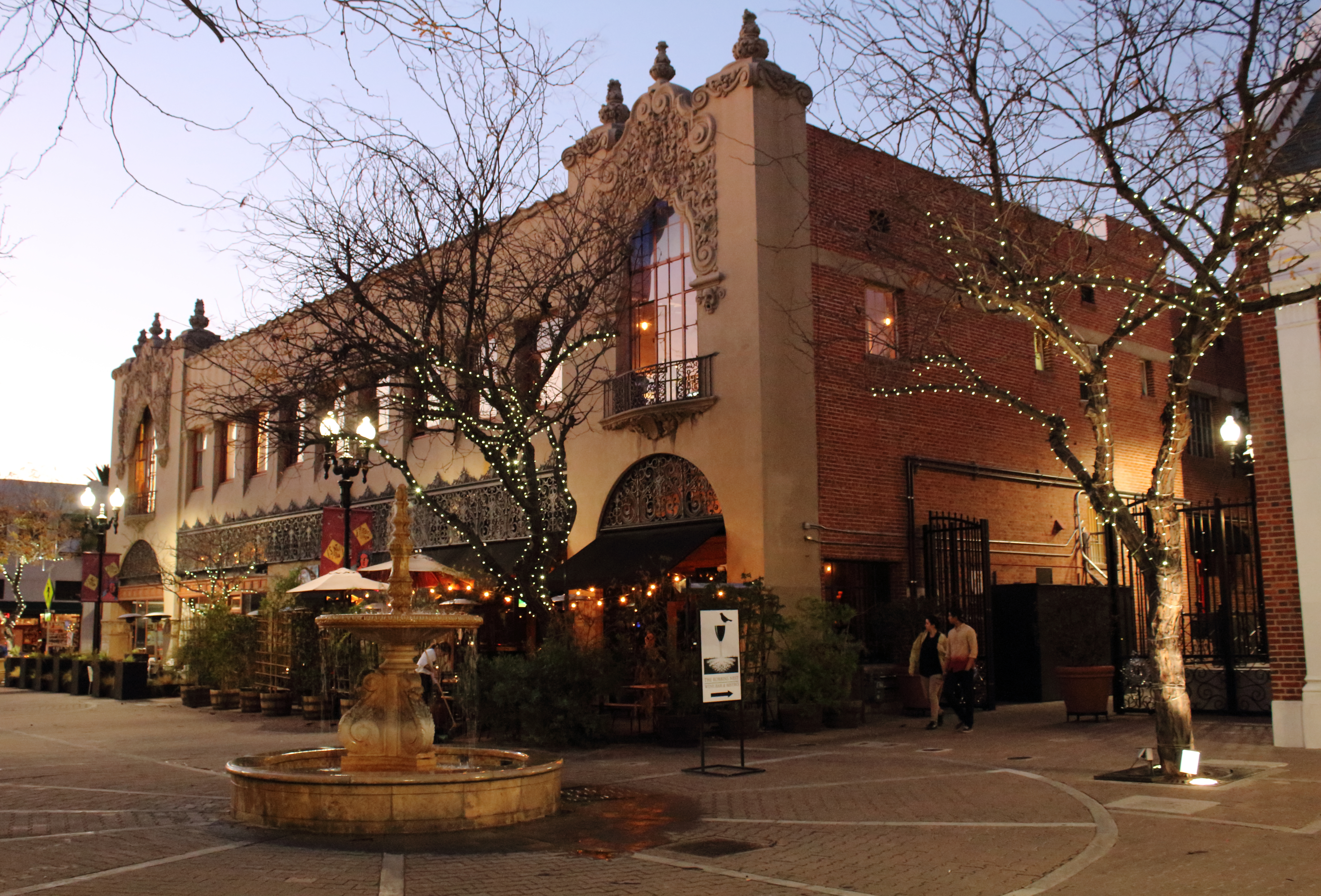
Historic Downtown Santa Ana

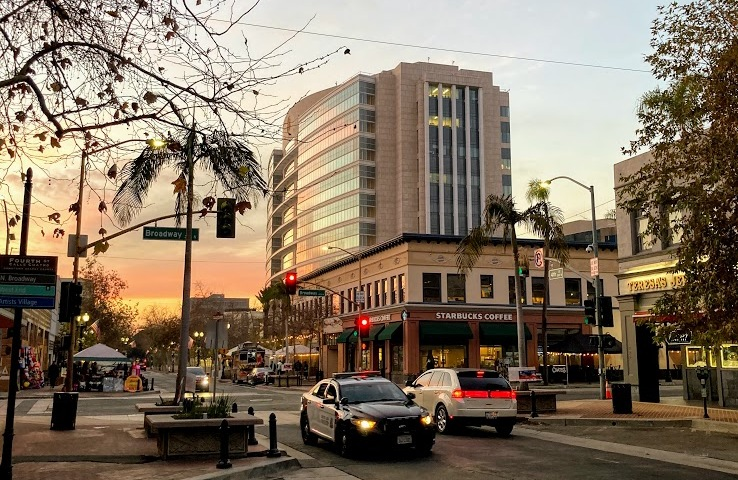
Downtown Santa Ana

Santa Ana is the corporate headquarters of several companies, including Behr Paint, First American Corporation, Greenwood & Hall, Ingram Micro, SchoolsFirst Federal Credit Union, STEC, TTM Technologies, Kern's, and Wahoo's Fish Taco. It also houses major regional headquarters for the Xerox corporation, Ultimate Software, and T-Mobile. Nonprofits based in Santa Ana include Open Doors.

One of Santa Ana's most notable businesses is the Rickenbacker musical instrument company, whose electric guitars and bass guitars earned fame in the hands of many rock and roll legends.

Then Glenn L. Martin Company, a precursor to Lockheed Martin, was founded in Santa Ana in 1912 before merging with the Wright Company in 1916.

In recent years, the nearby city of Irvine has outpaced Santa Ana in commercial growth, with the Irvine Business District located near John Wayne Airport. To compete with this, Santa Ana has approved commercial projects in the South Coast Metro area, as well as the "Metro East" development, located at the confluence of the Santa Ana Freeway and the Costa Mesa Freeway.

The Historic South Main Business District contains many older retail shops and other small businesses. It extends from downtown Santa Ana southwards on Main Street to the South Coast Metro area.

There was a recession in the 2000s, and the expected year for return to peak employment for the Los Angeles-Long Beach-Santa Ana area was 2015. The pre-recession peak year was 2007. Due to the recession, 519,300 jobs were lost, a 9% decrease. According to the Employment Development Department, the unemployment rate for 2015 was 5 percent.

=== Top employers ===
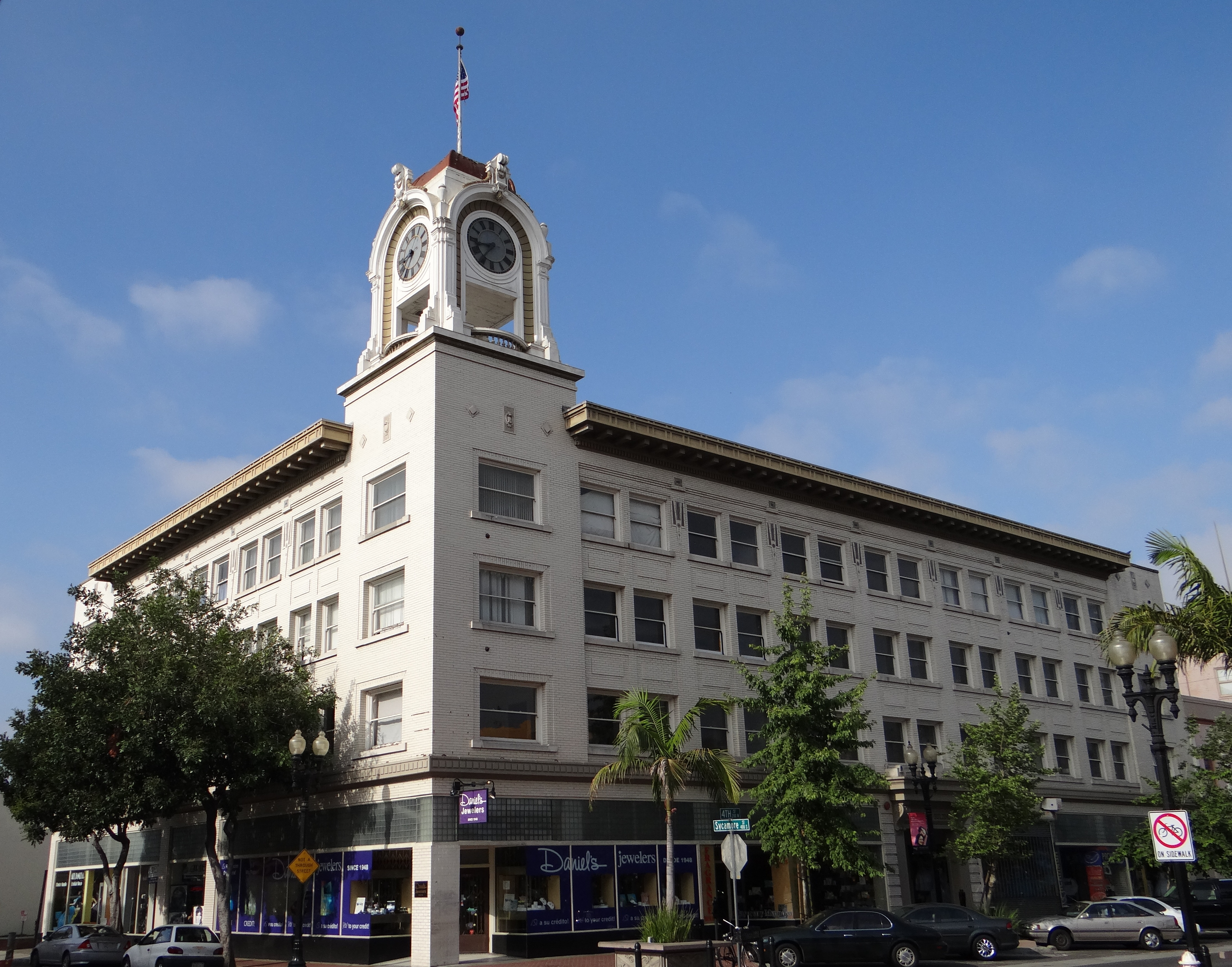
W.H. Spurgeon building

According to the city's 2024 Annual Comprehensive Financial Report, the top employers in the city are:

#	Employer	# of employees
1	County of Orange	19,179
2	Santa Ana Unified School District	5,985
3	Santa Ana College (includes Rancho Santiago Community College District)	4,271
4	KPC Healthcare (Integrated Healthcare Holdings Inc)	1,732
5	City of Santa Ana	1,671
6	United States Postal Service	1,393
7	Allied Universal	1,100
8	First American	980
9	Superior Court of CA, Orange County	743
10	Johnson & Johnson	522

Other large employers include Western Medical Center, TTM Technologies, MSC Software Corp, and Sterns Learning Inc.

== Arts and culture ==
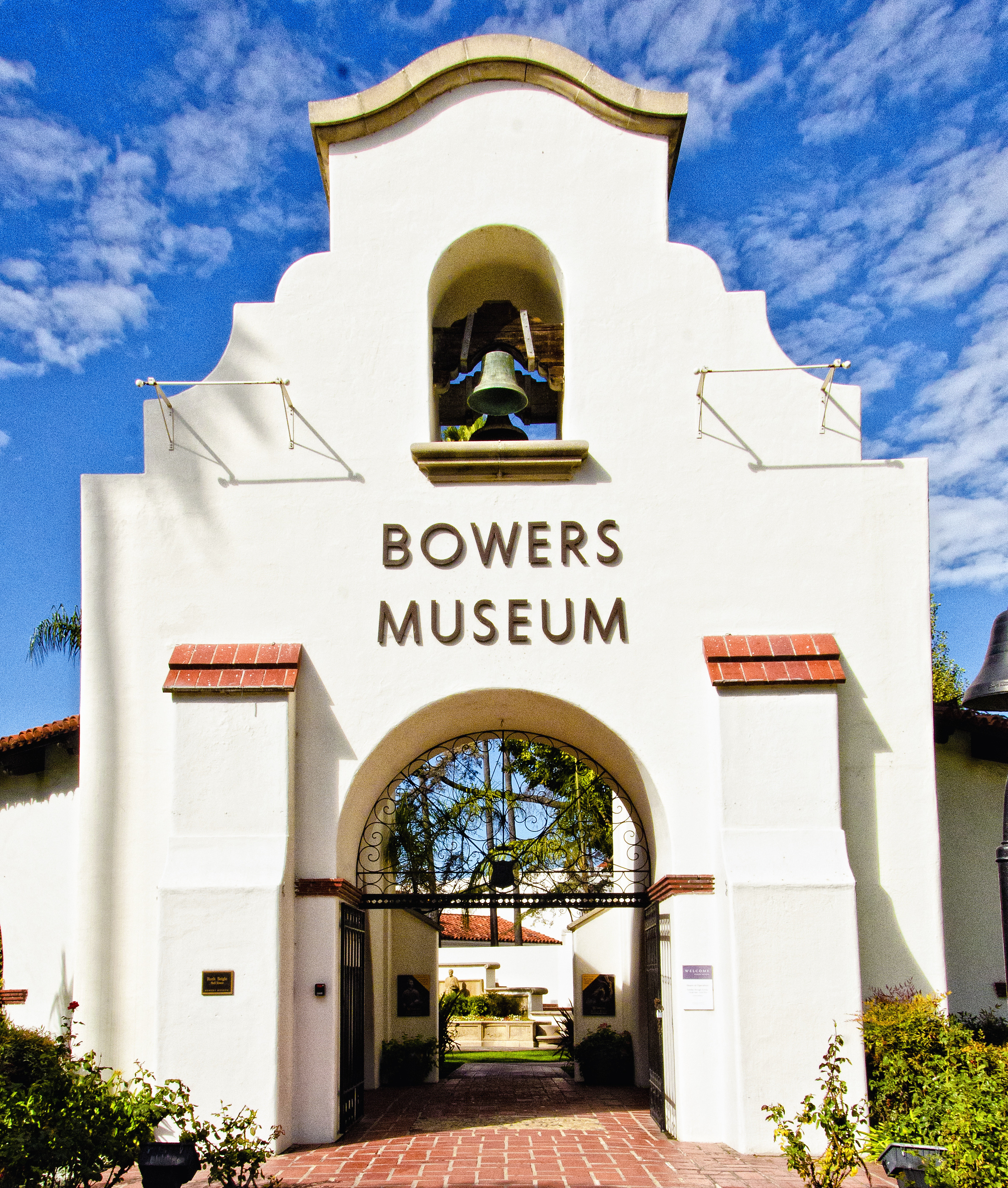
The Bowers Museum

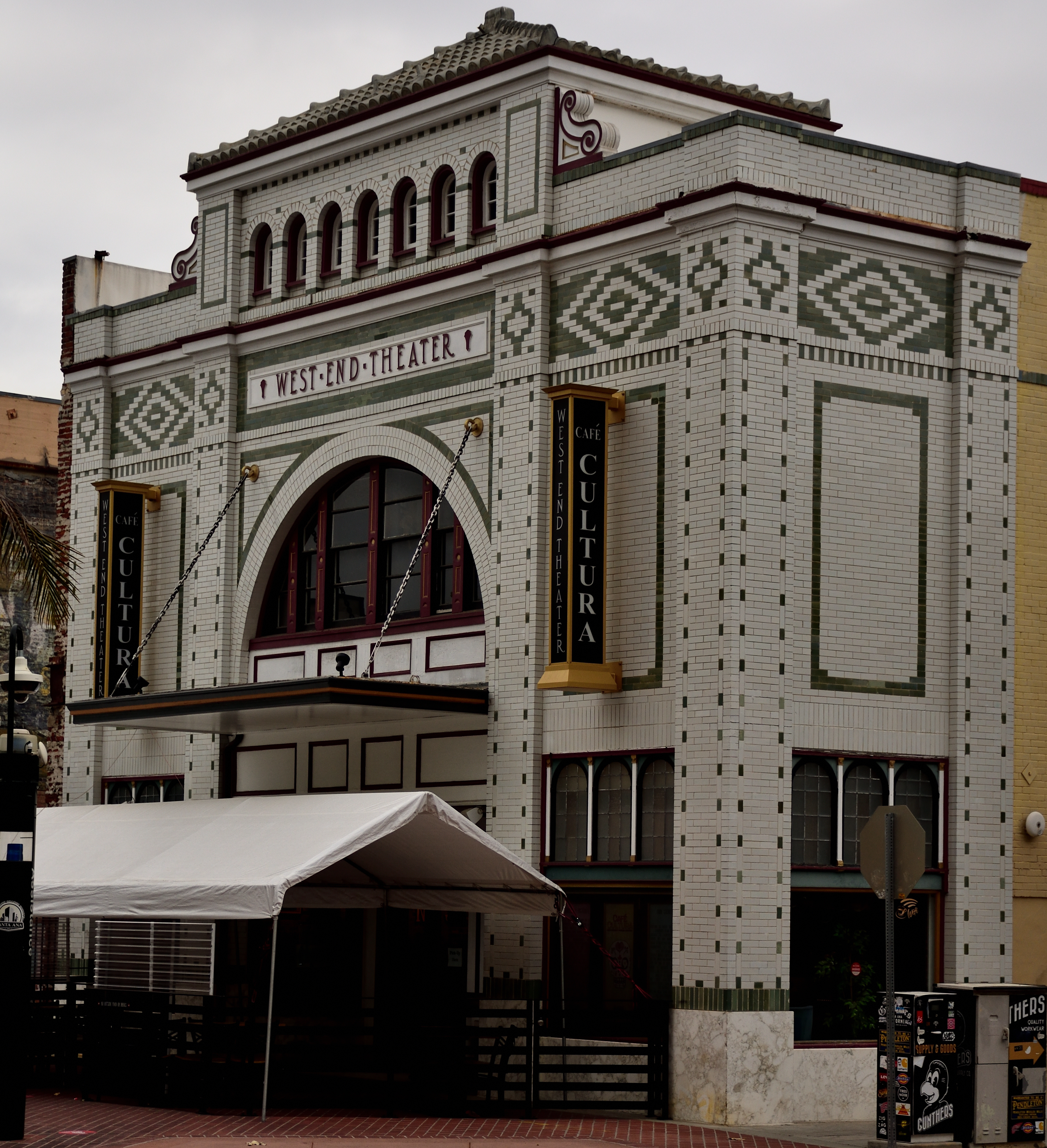
The West End Theatre

The Bowers Museum is art and history museum started in the 1930s with a large collection of fine art and artifacts from around the world and several traveling exhibits each year.

Santa Ana has several wall paintings and murals depicting local history, community events and cultural diversity in Orange County.

The Chiarini Fountain, designed and carved by Chiarini Marble & Stone, was donated by the Chiarini family in honor of George C. Chiarini and to recognize the artists who have helped make Downtown Santa Ana a creative center in Orange County.

Greenville, a former rural part of Santa Ana, has buildings over a century old, but industrial complexes have replaced the agricultural fields once surrounding the town.

The Disneyland and Knott's Berry Farm amusement parks are located northwest of Santa Ana, several kilometers away. Beaches are located around 20 minutes to the south, accessible by the 55 freeway. Huntington Beach and Newport Beach as well as other coastal communities offer shopping, dining, boating, swimming and surfing.

=== Sites of interest ===
- CSUF Grand Central Art Center - at the heart of the Artist Village in Santa Ana
- Discovery Cube Orange County
- Downtown National Register District
- Downtown Santa Ana Historic Districts
- El Centro Cultural de México
- Main Place Mall - opened in 1987
- Old Orange County Courthouse
- Santa Ana Civic Center
- Santa Ana College, part of the Rancho Santiago Community College District
- Santa Ana Zoo, built in 1960
- Pacific Electric Sub-Station No. 14
- Rankin Building - once Santa Ana's iconic local department store
- Yost Theater
- Lyon Air Museum
- The Kellogg House
- South Coast Metro
- John Wayne Airport
- MainPlace Mall
- Heritage Museum of Orange County

== Registered Historic Places ==
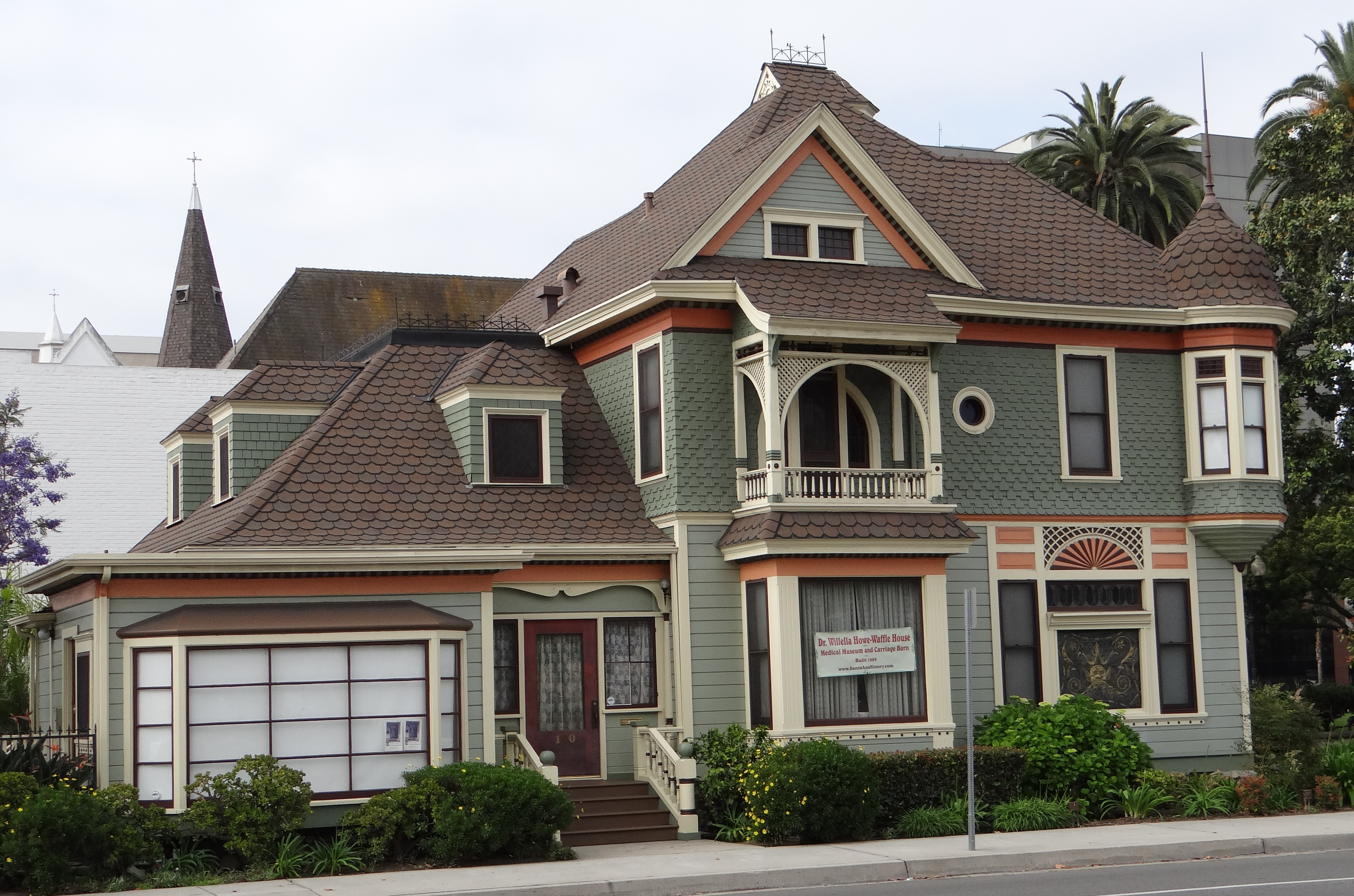
Howe-Waffle House in 2012

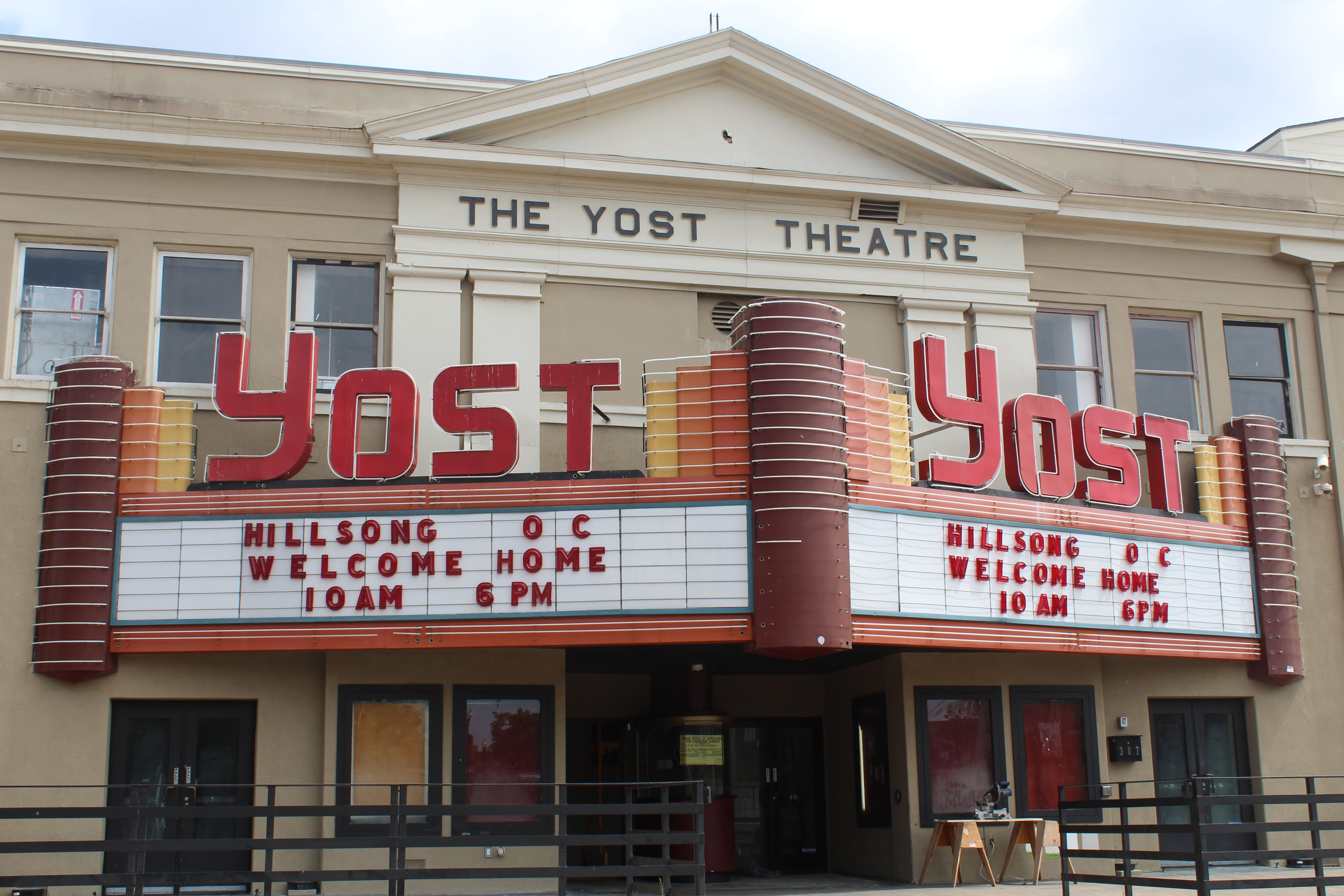
Yost Theater in 2017

- Builders Exchange Building
- Downtown Santa Ana Historic Districts
- Ebell Society of Santa Ana Valley
- French Park Historic District
- Harmon-McNeil House
- Howe-Waffle House and Carriage House
- Lighter-than-air Ship Hangars
- George L. Wright House
- George W. Minter House
- Odd Fellows Hall
- Orange County Courthouse
- Pacific Electric Sub-Station No.14
- Rankin Building
- Santa Ana City Hall
- Santa Ana Fire Station Headquarters No 1
- Santora Building
- Smith-Tuthill Funeral Parlors
- Southern Counties Gas Co.
- Spurgeon Block
- Us Post Office Station
- Walkers Orange County Theatre
- Yost Theatre– Ritz Hotel
- Young Men's Christian Association

== Sports ==
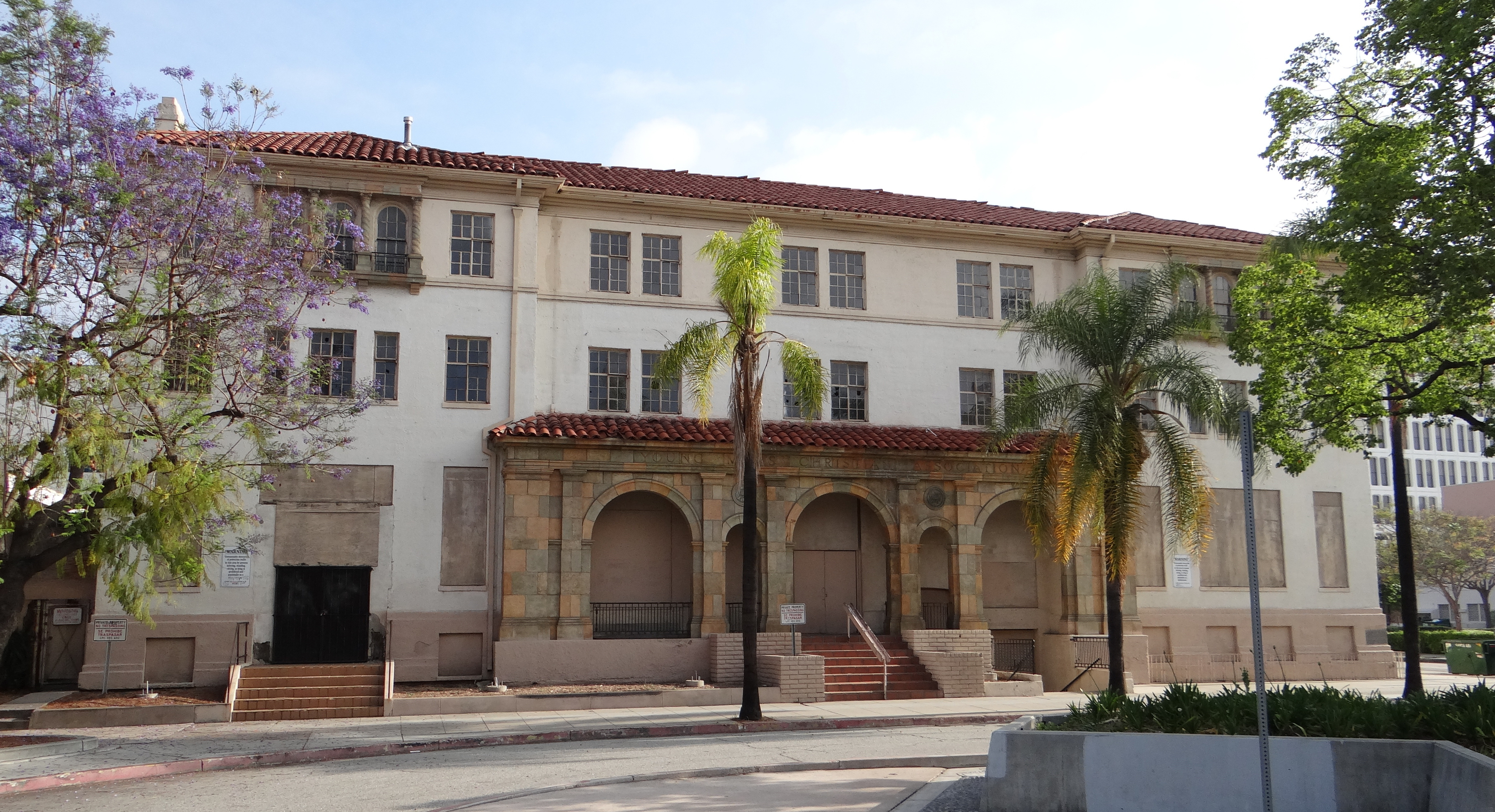
Historic YMCA building

Santa Ana has highly competitive high school and collegiate sports teams playing at Santa Ana Stadium and the Santa Ana Unified School District Sports Complex Stadium.

The Dons of Santa Ana College are one of the most successful soccer teams in the state of California, and is a frequent top finisher, statewide. In 2008, the Dons clinched their fifteenth consecutive Orange Empire Conference title. The college is also known for its historically successful baseball teams, and for producing former Texas Rangers and Los Angeles Angels pitcher C. J. Wilson.

Mater Dei High School's football program has been described as one of the most successful in the country, having produced numerous Division I recruits and multiple state championships.

== Government ==
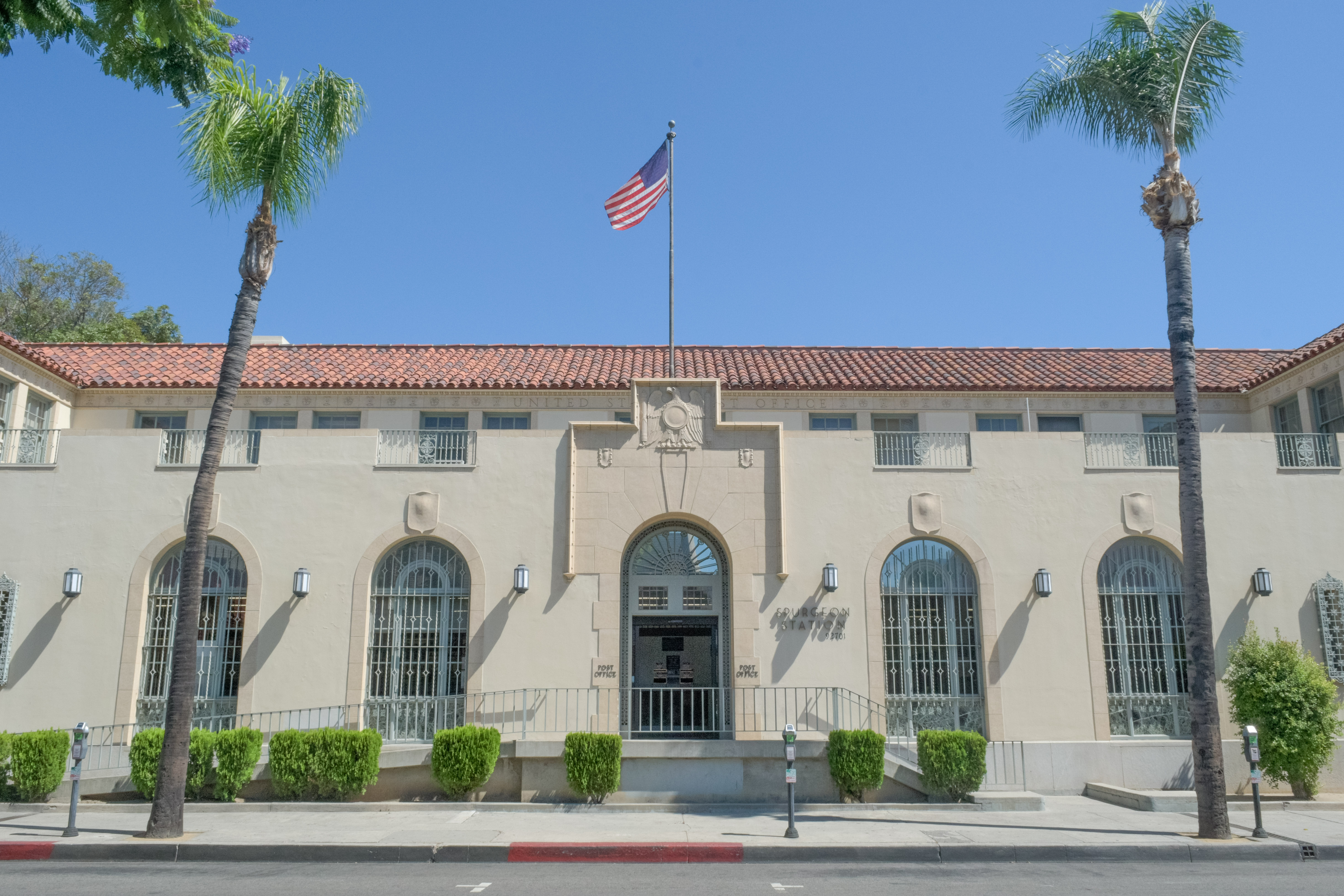
Santa Ana Post Office

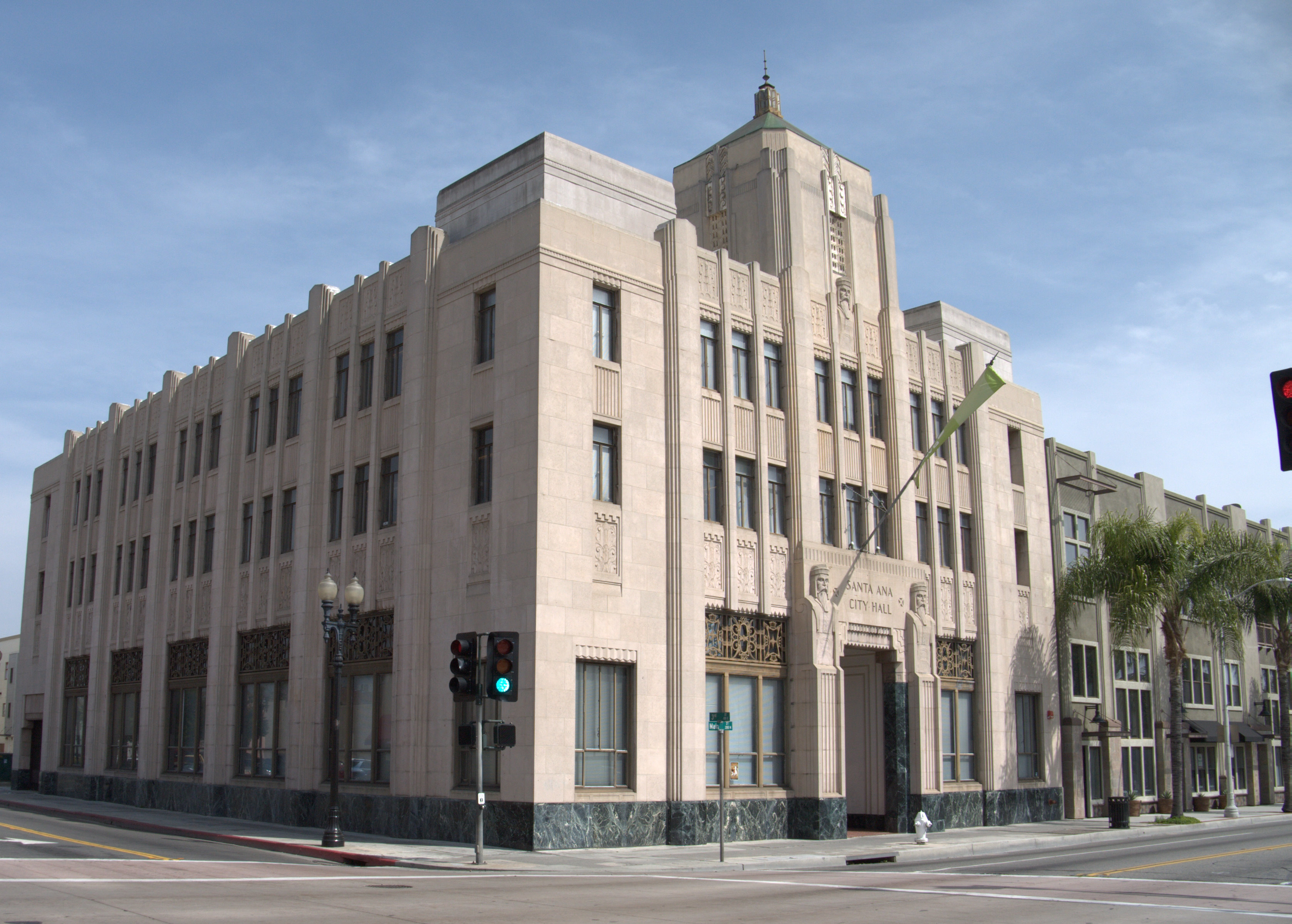
Santa Ana City Hall

Santa Ana is a charter city and utilizes a council-manager form of government. The council consists of six members who are elected by the populace of the city. Each member serves for four years and can serve a total of three terms. A mayor pro tem is elected by the council members from within the council.

In the California State Legislature, Santa Ana is in the 34th senatorial district, represented by Democrat Tom Umberg and is split between the 68th Assembly district, represented by Democrat Avelino Valencia, and the 70th Assembly district, represented by Republican Tri Ta.

In the United States House of Representatives, Santa Ana is in California's 46th congressional district, represented by Democrat Lou Correa.

Additionally, in the Orange County Board of Supervisors, Santa Ana is in the second district represented by Vicente Sarmiento since 2023.

Like most majority-minority cities in the United States, Santa Ana is a stronghold of the Democratic Party. Despite the city's high percentage of Democrats, the city tends to vote conservatively on social issues, much like the rest of northern Orange County. It voted in favor of Proposition 8—California's amendment defining marriage in the state as a legal union between a man and a woman—by 61.9%, above the county's average of 57.7%. On Proposition 4, which would have amended the California Constitution to require minors to notify their parents before having an abortion, Santa Ana voted in favor of the measure by 62.0%, much higher than the county as a whole, which voted in favor of the measure by only 54.3%.

The Consulate-General of Mexico in Santa Ana is located on 828 North Broadway Street. The Consulate-General of El Salvador in Santa Ana is located in Suite 103 at 840 North Grand Avenue.

== Education ==
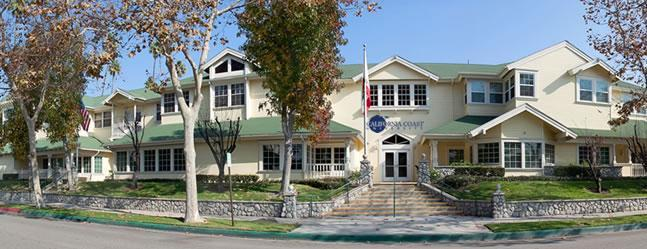
California Coast University

The majority of the city is served by the Santa Ana Unified School District, which includes 37 K–5 elementary schools, nine 6–8 intermediate schools, eight 9–12 high schools, five special schools, and one charter school. Some elementary schools are John Adams Elementary School, Manuel Esqueda Elementary School, Diamond Elementary School.

The school district provides an online accountability report card. Other school districts that serve Santa Ana are the Garden Grove, Orange and Tustin Unified School Districts.

Santa Ana Unified School District's public high schools include Valley High School (Santa Ana), Middle College High School, Santa Ana High School, Saddleback High School, Century High School, newly opened Segerstrom Fundamental High School and Godinez Fundamental High School, and other public schools in the area, along with the Orange County School of the Arts in the midtown district.

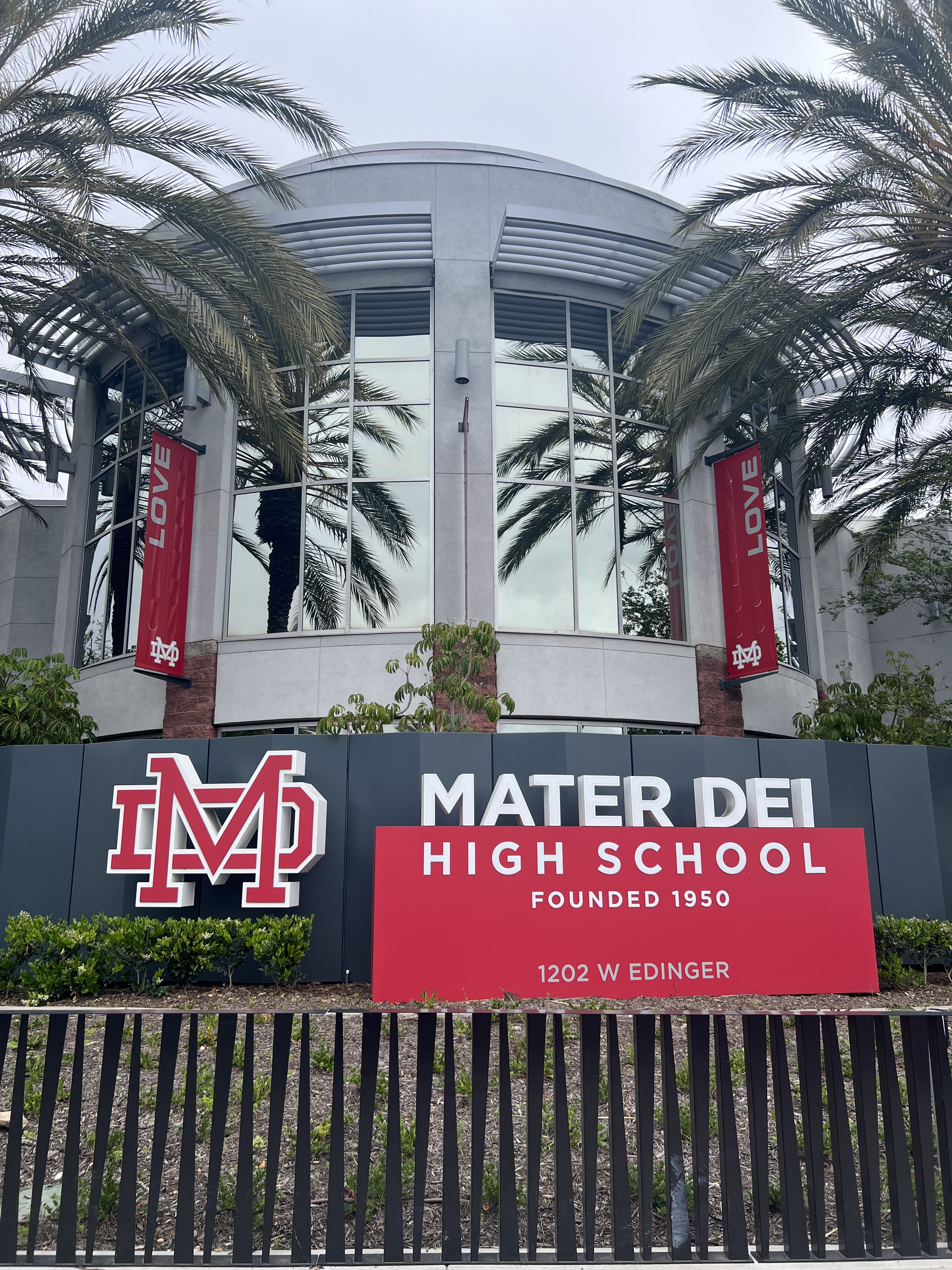
Mater Dei High School

The Roman Catholic Diocese operates Mater Dei High School. The Diocese also operates several K–8 schools in Santa Ana, including School of Our Lady, Saint Anne, Saint Barbara, and Saint Joseph. Immaculate Heart of Mary and Our Lady of the Pillar schools were closed in 2005 and merged into the School of Our Lady, which is located at Immaculate Heart of Mary Parish. (See Roman Catholic Diocesan Schools in Santa Ana, California). In September 2005 the Orange County Campus of International School of Los Angeles (LILA) moved to Santa Ana. In July 2015 it moved back to Orange.

The Armenian Apostolic Church operates the Ari Guiragos Minassian Armenian School, a preschool through elementary school since 1986.

The city is also home to Santa Ana College, a two-year public community college, as well as California Coast University, and the Orange County branch of the Art Institute of California. Taft Law School, a correspondence law school, is also based in Santa Ana. Trinity Law School is a Christian, CBE-accredited law school that is the only California campus of the Trinity International University system of schools. Detective Training Institute is a correspondence/distance learning institution that offers private investigator diplomas and is approved to operate by the Bureau for Private Postsecondary Education. Career Networks Institute College, a post-secondary occupational learning center for allied health, is also based in the city.

== Infrastructure ==
=== Transportation ===
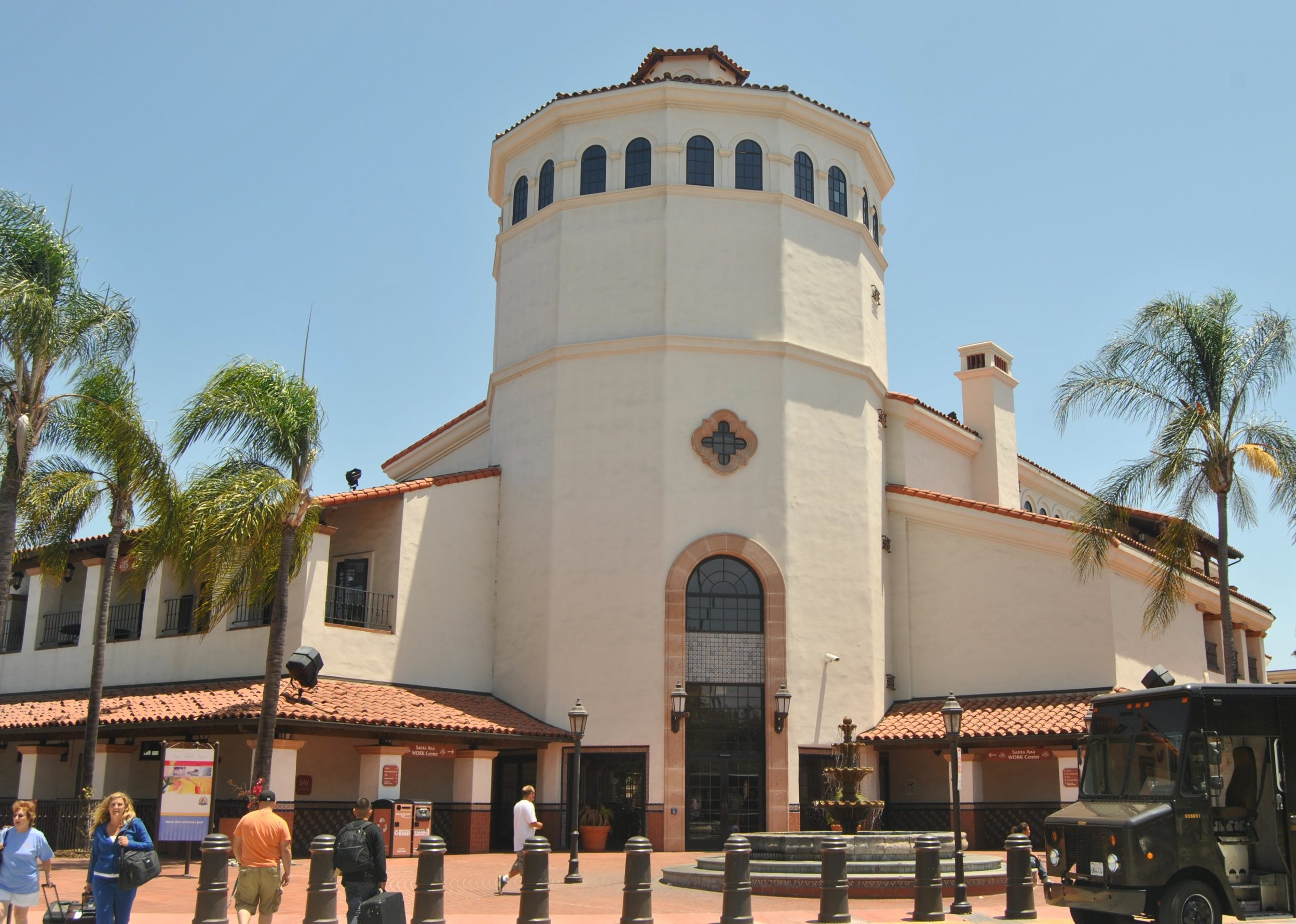
The Santa Ana Regional Transportation Center was built in 1985.

A few freeways run through Santa Ana, connecting it to other areas in Orange County, the Greater Los Angeles Area, and beyond. The Santa Ana Freeway (Interstate 5) heads north to Los Angeles, and south towards Southern Orange County and San Diego. The Garden Grove Freeway (State Route 22) runs along near Santa Ana's northern border, connecting Long Beach to the west and the City of Orange to the east. The Costa Mesa Freeway (State Route 55) travels south to Costa Mesa; and then north to the Riverside Freeway (State Route 91), providing connections to Riverside to the east and Beach Cities to the west. The southern terminus of the Orange Freeway (State Route 57) (where the freeway intersects with I-5 and SR 22 at the Orange Crush interchange) is partially within the city limits of Santa Ana and provides a connection to Pomona and the San Gabriel Valley in Los Angeles County.

Amtrak, the national passenger rail system, provides service to Santa Ana several times on weekdays with less frequent service on weekends. It operates its Pacific Surfliner between San Diego to the south and either Los Angeles or San Luis Obispo to the north (see Santa Ana Regional Transportation Center). Greyhound Lines is the largest bus transportation service in Santa Ana, and serves the continental United States and Canada. The bus lines Crucero, Intercalifornias, and others serve all points into Mexico.

The Santa Ana Regional Transportation Center is also served by commuter rail trains of Metrolink: the Orange County Line (Oceanside to Union Station), and Inland Empire–Orange County Line (San Bernardino to Oceanside).

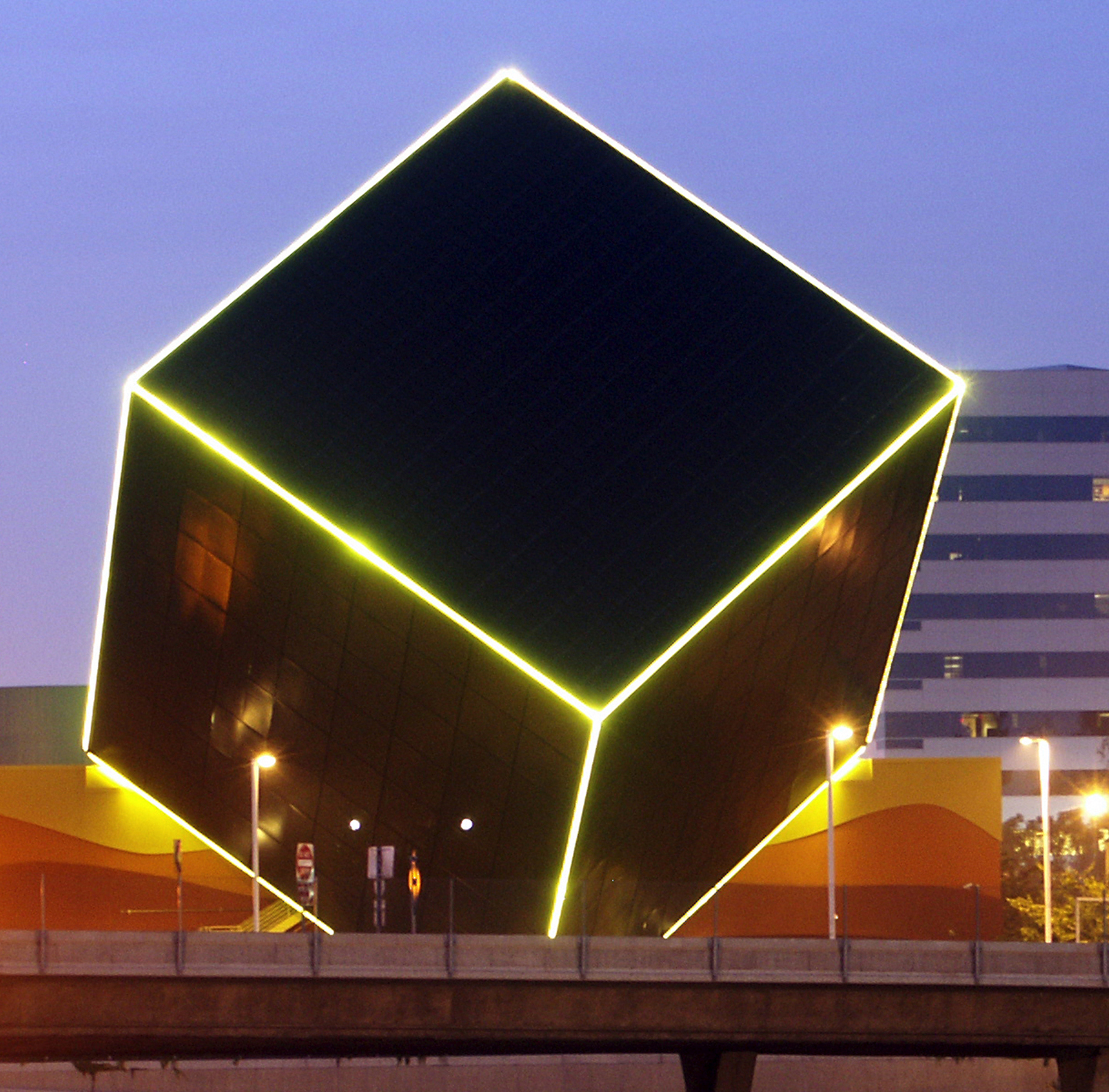
Discovery Cube Orange County

Public transit bus service is available via the Orange County Transportation Authority (OCTA) and is mainly focused on busses and freeways. 24 bus routes run through the city crossing 659 different bus stops. A 4.15-mile OCTA light rail line running between Santa Ana and Garden Grove, the OC Streetcar, is currently under construction and planned to enter service in 2026.

John Wayne Airport is located at 18601 Airport Way Santa Ana, CA 92707. The IATA code for the airport is SNA.

Some main roads that run through Santa Ana include McFadden Avenue, Warner Avenue, MacArthur Boulevard, Civic Center Drive, and Santa Ana Boulevard, running east to west. Bristol Street, Fairview Street, and Main Street are all important streets running from north to south.

=== Utilities ===
Electricity for the city is provided by Southern California Edison. The Southern California Gas Company provides natural gas service. Phone and cable television service is provided by AT&T. Water in Santa Ana is supplied by the Santa Ana Water Resource Division. A majority of this water is groundwater, which is pumped by 20 wells tapped into the Orange County Groundwater Basin. Additional water is imported through the Metropolitan Water District of Southern California, which sources water from Lake Havasu via the Colorado River Aqueduct and the State Water Project from Sacramento and San Joaquin Rivers in Northern California.

=== Emergency services ===
Law enforcement is provided by the Santa Ana Police Department from three stations throughout the city. The department includes five canine units, an 11-officer equestrian unit and a 37-member SWAT team. The city shares a helicopter with the cities of Costa Mesa and Newport Beach via the Airborne Law Enforcement (ABLE) program.

In March 2012, the city disbanded its municipal fire department, which had provided fire protection for 128 years, and contracted with the Orange County Fire Authority.

=== Crime ===
2023 Uniform Crime Report data
	Aggravated Assault	Homicide	Rape	Robbery	Burglary	Larceney Theft	Motor Vehicle Theft	Arson
Santa Ana	1,154	6	158	384	1,118	3,754	1,262	49

== Sister cities ==
- Sahuayo, Mexico

== See also ==
- Outline of Santa Ana, California
- List of California communities with Hispanic majority populations
- List of U.S. cities with large Hispanic populations
- Santiago Creek
- Santora Building
