= Santora Building =

- Santora Arts Building
- U.S. National Register of Historic Places
- California Historical Landmark
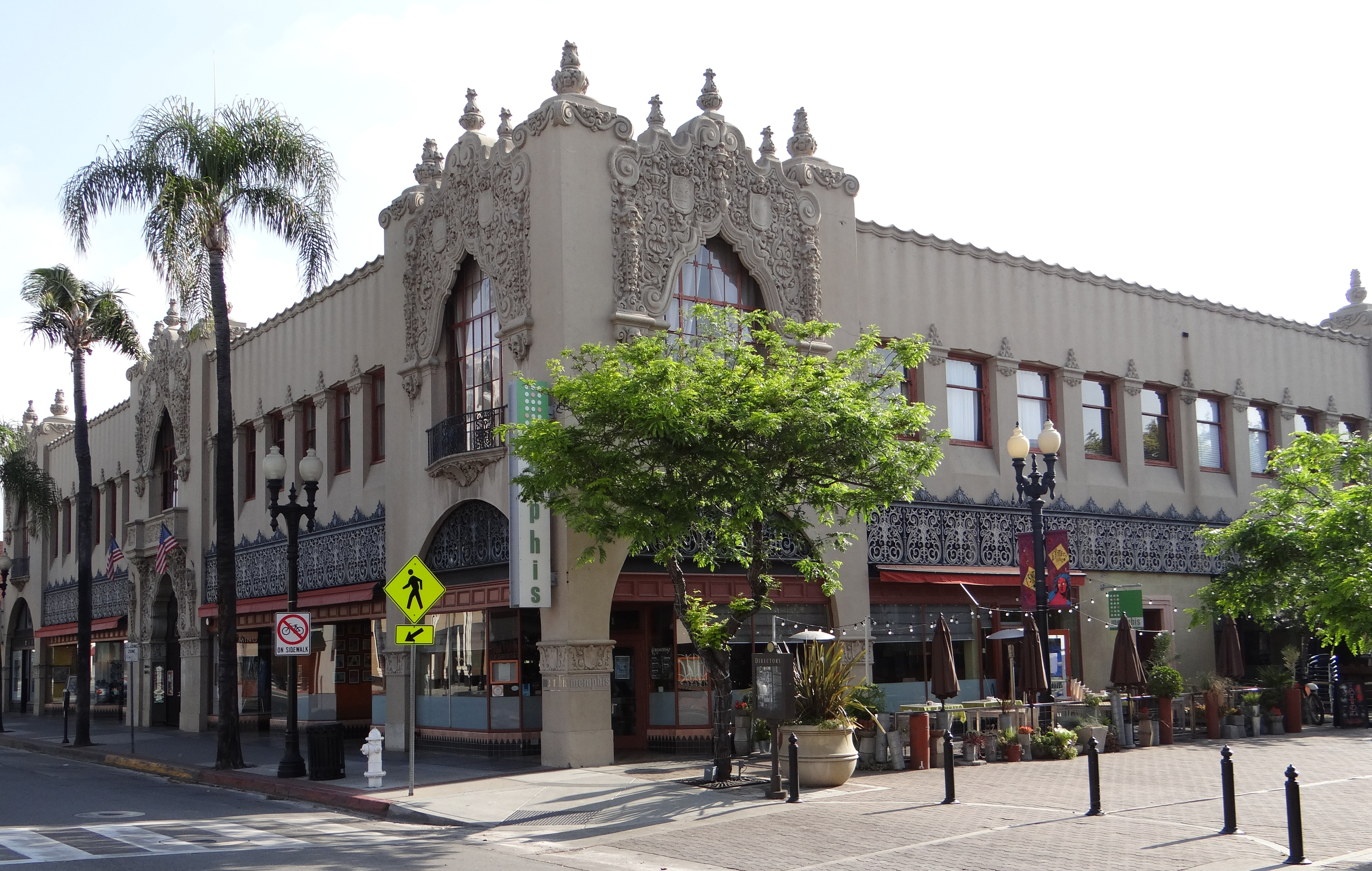

- Location within California Location within the United States
- Location: 207 N. Broadway; Santa Ana, California
- Coordinates: 33°44′47″N 117°52′8″W
- Architect: Frank Lansdowne
- Architectural style: California Churrigueresque (Spanish Colonial Revival)
- NRHP reference No.: 82000976
- Added to NRHP: December 27, 1982

The Santora is a historic commercial building located in Downtown Historic District of Santa Ana, California. It now houses art galleries, retail stores, and restaurants.

== Architecture ==
The building was designed by Frank Lansdowne, one of the premier architects of the region, and groundbreaking on it took place on July 7, 1928. It is in the California Churrigueresque style of Spanish Colonial Revival architecture.

The Santora is listed in the National Register of Historic Places, and its record number is 386426.

== History ==
From 1934 until 1944, Daninger's Tea Room occupied the rooms on the second floor, southwest corner. The restaurant was famous for its home cooked meals and pleasant atmosphere, and attracted a clientele that included Hollywood celebrities Jack Benny, Milton Berle, Billie Burke, Charles Ruggles, Connie Haines, Lucille Ball, Gracie Allen, George Burns, Joan Davis, Rosalind Russell, Robert Young, William Holden and Alan Ladd, all of whom signed the guest book.

After a period of decline in Santa Ana's downtown the Santora resurged as an arts complex where a number of different artists moved in including Joseph Musil and his Salon of the Art Deco Theaters. Musil was a set designer for the Walt Disney company and worked on the El Capitan Theatre in Hollywood.

== See also ==
- National Register of Historic Places listings in Orange County, California
