= Orange County Hall of Fame =

Regional hall of fame in California

The Orange County Hall of Fame is a hall of fame recognizing significant and notable people with a connection to Orange County, California. The Orange County Board of Supervisors voted unanimously to create the hall in 2023, inducting an inaugural 10-person class in the process. New inductees are selected annually.

== Inductees ==
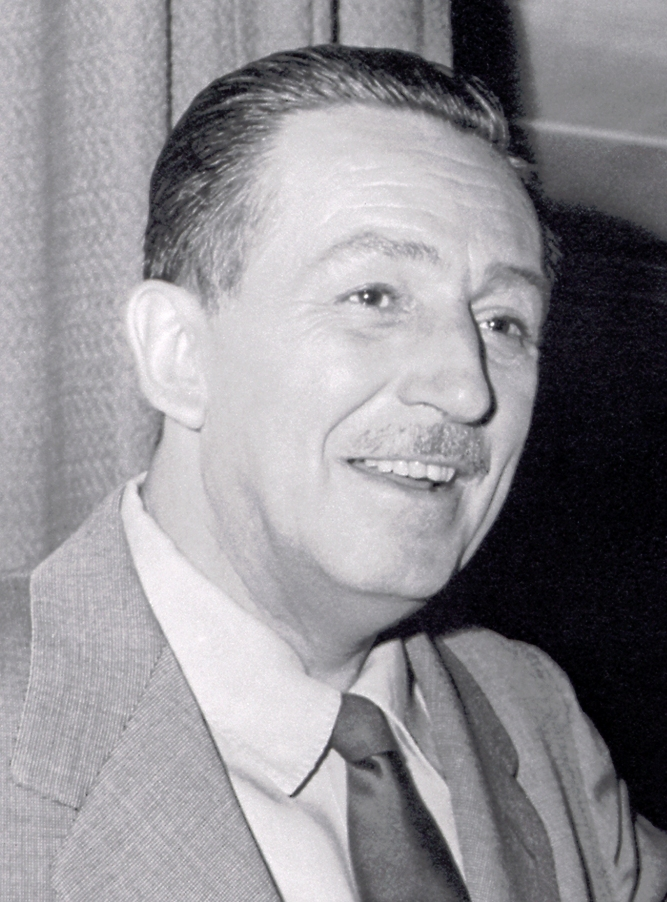
Walt Disney, an inductee of the inaugural class

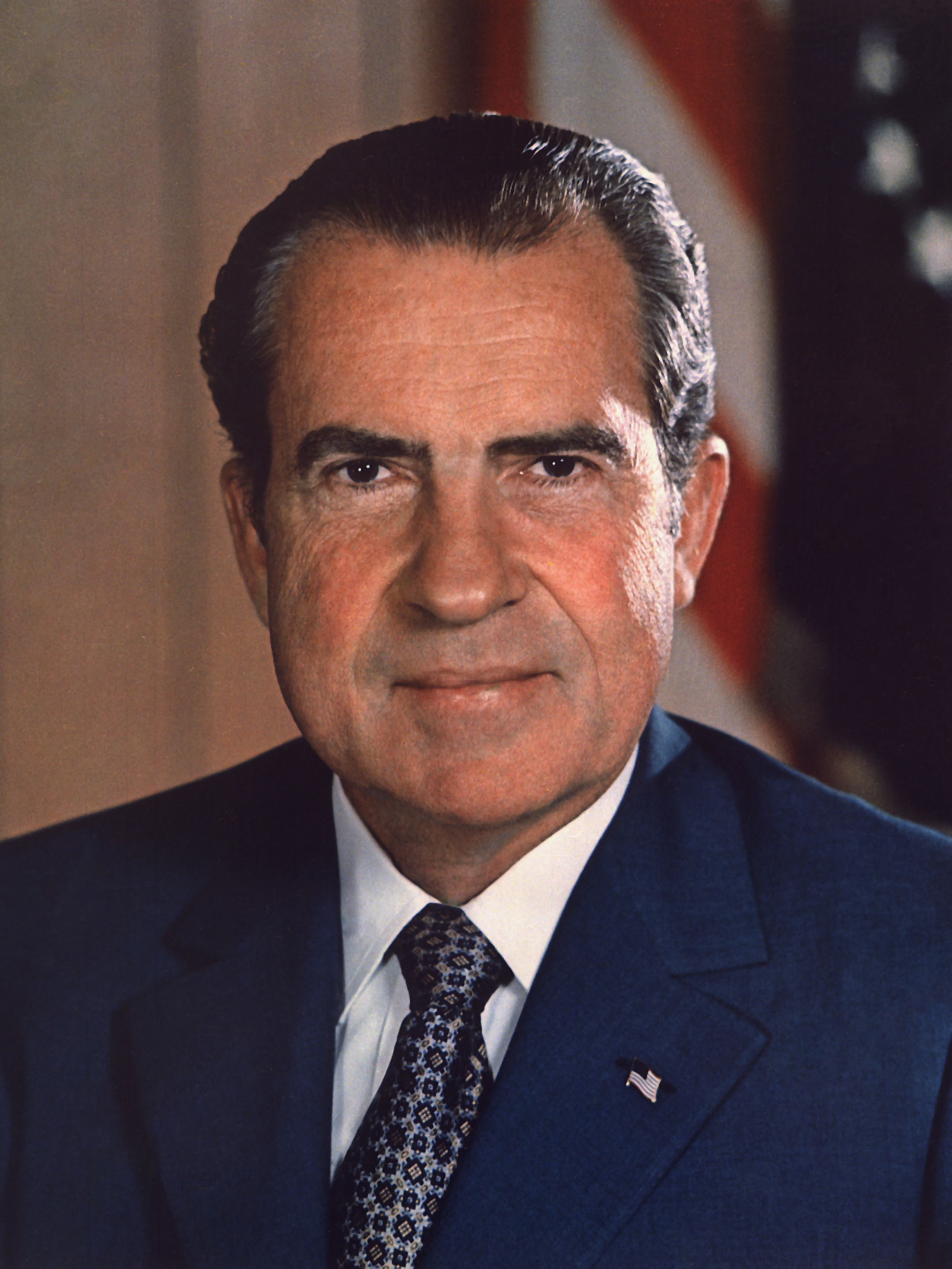
Richard Nixon, an inductee of the Class of 2024 and the first President to be inducted

Orange County Hall of Fame
Year	Name	Category	Notes
2025	Robert August	Music, Arts & Entertainment	
2025	James Cameron	Music, Arts & Entertainment	
2025	Ed Caruthers	Sports	
2025	James Irvine I	Philanthropy	
2025	Ed Laird	Philanthropy	
2025	Sammy Lee	Sports	
2025	Henry and Susan Samueli	Philanthropy	
2025	Eddie Sheldrake	Sports	
2025	Carl St. Clair	Music, Arts & Entertainment	
2025	Gaddi Vasquez	Civics	
2024	Nick Berardino	Civics	Vietnam Veteran; President of Veterans Alliance of Orange County (VALOR)
2024	Clarence "Leo" Fender	Music, Arts & Entertainment	Native of Anaheim; Resident of Fullerton until his death in 1991; Founder of Fender
2024	Carl N. Karcher	Business	Founder of Carl's Jr
2024	Wing Lam and the Lee Family	Business	Founders of Wahoo's Fish Taco
2024	Sylvia Mendez	Civics	Native of Santa Ana; helped end forced segregation of Mexican American students in the state of California via Mendez v. Westminster
2024	Richard Nixon	Civics	Native of Yorba Linda; served as the 37th President from 1969 to 1974; served as the 36th Vice President from 1953 to 1961 under President Dwight D. Eisenhower
2024		Civics	
2024		Philanthropy	
2024		Business	
2023	Frank Jao	Business	Founder of the Asian Garden Mall in Westminster
2023	William Lyon	Civics	Chairman and CEO of OC-based AirCal
2023	Walt Disney	Music, Arts & Entertainment	Founder of Disneyland in Anaheim
2023	Bill Medley	Music, Arts & Entertainment	Native of Santa Ana
2023	Gwen Stefani	Music, Arts & Entertainment	Native of Fullerton
2023	Henry Segerstrom	Philanthropy	Native of Santa Ana; founded the Segerstrom Center for the Arts in Costa Mesa
2023	Amanda Beard	Sports	Native of Newport Beach
2023	Kobe Bryant	Sports	Resident of Newport Beach from 2002 until his death in 2020
2023	Greg Louganis	Sports	Attended Santa Ana High School, Mission Viejo High School, and UC Irvine
2023	Tiger Woods	Sports	Native of Cypress, graduate of Western High School

== Reception ==
An article published in The Orange County Register criticized the "wee bit two-dimensional" composure of the hall's inaugural class, arguing that it should include people who illustrate the "complex history" of the county. According to the author, notable omissions from the first class included civil rights activist Sylvia Mendez, pastor Rick Warren, Catholic priest Junípero Serra, U.S. president Richard Nixon, and actor John Wayne. The author also satirically suggested that former county officials involved in scandals, such as treasurer Robert Citron and sheriff Mike Carona, be inducted into the hall.
