= Segerstrom =

Segerstrom may refer to

- Segerström (surname)
- C.J. Segerstrom & Sons, a real estate company in Orange County, California, U.S.
- Segerstrom Center for the Arts, a performing arts complex in Costa Mesa, California, U.S.
- Segerstrom High School in Santa Ana, California, U.S.
