= South Coast Metro =

District in Orange County, California

Coordinates: 33°42′0″N 117°53′0″W

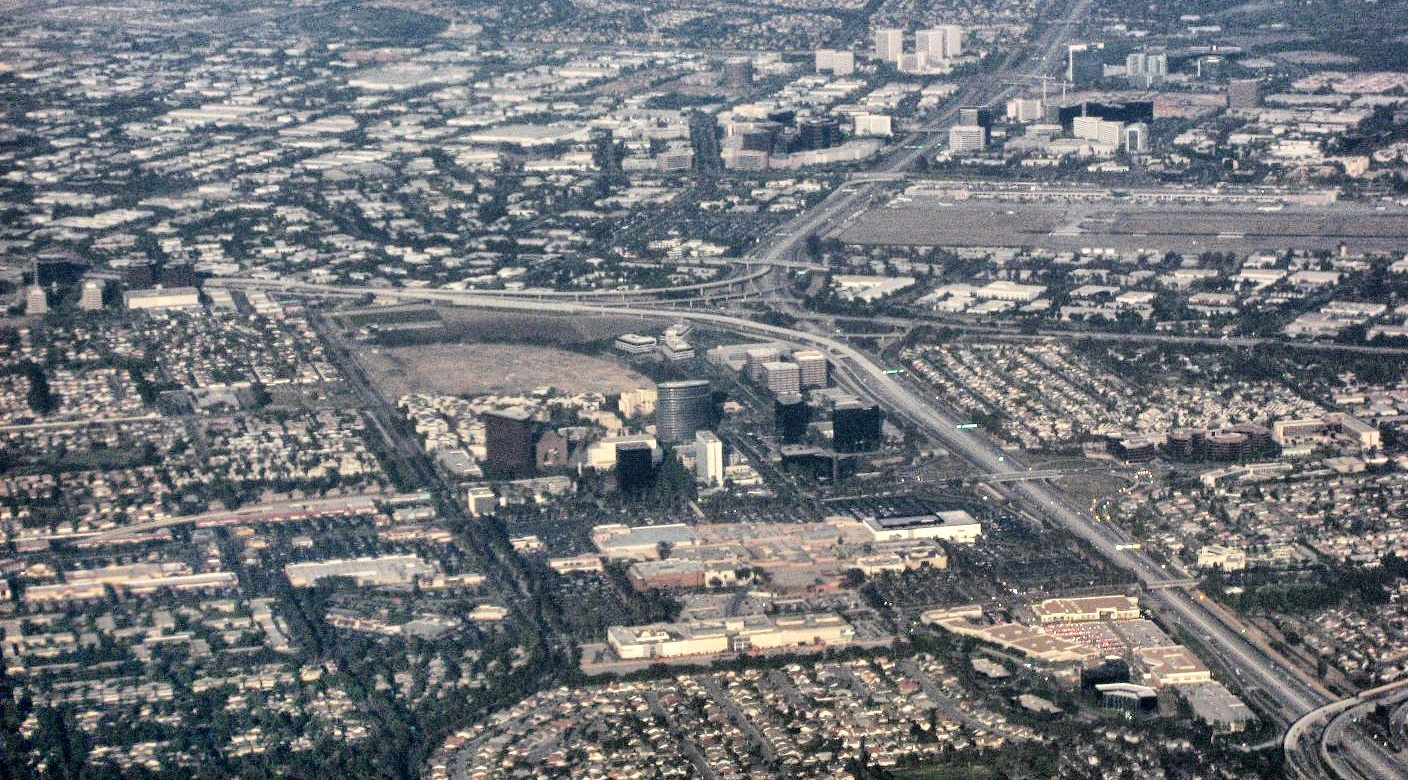
Aerial view of the South Coast Plaza–John Wayne Airport edge city with the Irvine Business Complex (top), John Wayne Airport runway (upper center), South Coast Metro buildings (lower center) and below, the South Coast Plaza mall

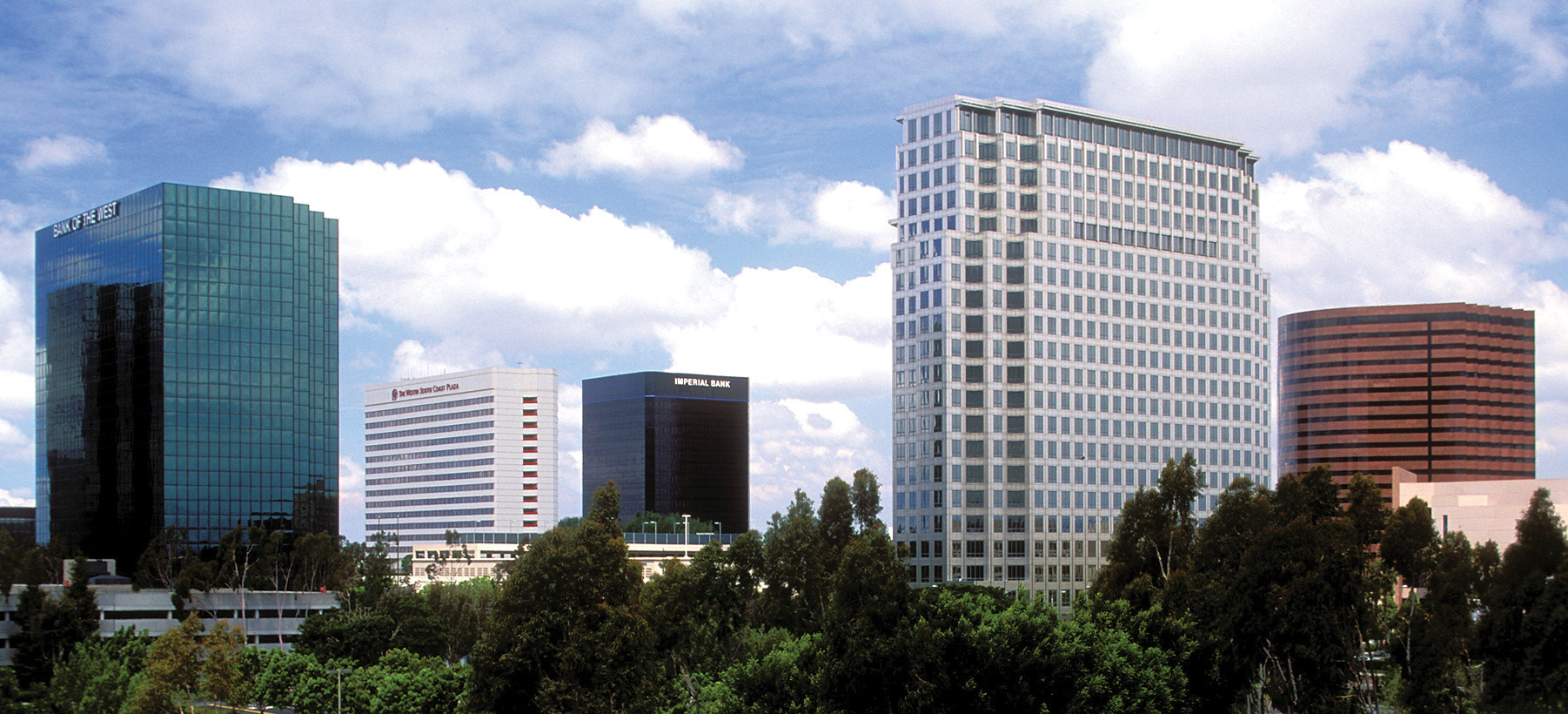
South Coast Metro Skyline

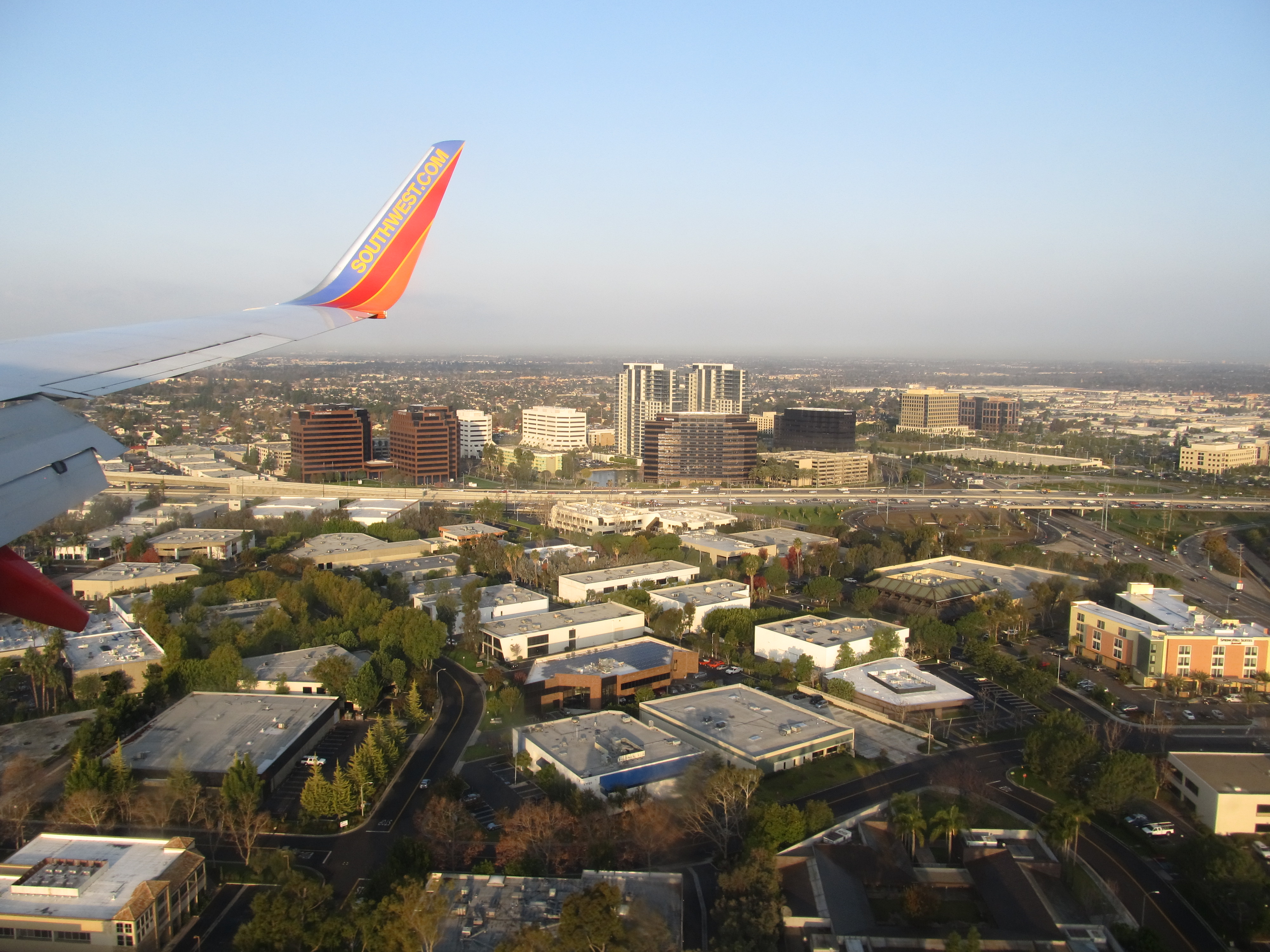
Office buildings near John Wayne Airport

The South Coast Metro is a district in Orange County, California within the cities of Costa Mesa and Santa Ana. The area is a dense mix of residential, office, and retail developments that spreads out from the South Coast Plaza mall. It forms part of the South Coast Plaza–John Wayne Airport edge city, a concentration of business, shopping, and entertainment outside a traditional central business district. The edge city's area is defined to include John Wayne Airport, the Irvine Business Complex (IBC), The District and The Market Place shopping centers, and the University of California, Irvine campus. This larger definition extends into Newport Beach, Irvine, and Tustin.

== South Coast Metro ==
South Coast Metro straddles the city limits of Santa Ana and Costa Mesa, and is a dense mix of residential, office, and retail developments that spread out from South Coast Plaza and forms an urban-retail village that is distinct from the surrounding suburban development. The cultural elements include the Segerstrom Center for the Arts and South Coast Repertory theater company.

=== History ===
C. J. Segerstrom and Sons, a commercial real estate and retail management organization established in 1898, spearheaded commercial development in Orange County, California. Henry Segerstrom, as managing partner of the family-owned company, transformed the agricultural area into a lively, international destination. In March 1967, Henry T. Segerstrom, along with his cousin Hal T. Segerstrom, Jr., opened a shopping center called South Coast Plaza in one of the family's lima bean fields in rapidly growing Orange County. Two high-rise residential towers, dubbed Skyline at Macarthur Place, were built in 2016 in the northeast corner of South Coast Metro by developer Skyline OC. The 25-story towers were marketed as high-end luxury condominiums.

=== Geography ===
South Coast Metro's boundaries are generally defined as:

- North: Segerstrom Avenue
- South: San Diego Freeway (I-405)
- West: Fairview Road
- East: Costa Mesa Freeway (SR 55)

Used often in real estate listings, the South Coast Metro moniker is not recognized by the USPS or other government entities as a distinct region. While there is no separate ZIP code for South Coast Metro, a freeway sign for the area is on the southbound Costa Mesa Freeway at MacArthur Boulevard.
