= C. J. Segerstrom & Sons =

American real estate company in Orange County, California

C. J. Segerstrom & Sons is an American family business incorporated as a real estate company in Orange County, California (along with the Irvine Company and the O'Neill family), in the city of Costa Mesa. Through the family's dedicated community leadership, especially that of Henry T. Segerstrom, gifts of valuable land and financial resources, and distinctive, lifelong commitment to the cultural life of the region, Orange County has gained renown.

== History ==
Swedish immigrant Carl Segerstrom began by buying a large lima bean farm in 1900. A farming family, the Segerstroms moved from dairy farming to cultivating alfalfa, eventually specializing in the production and harvesting of lima beans. They would become the largest producers of dried lima beans in the United States.

During WWII, the Segerstrom family farm was converted to the Santa Ana Army Air Base and housed 47,000 personnel. When the government withdrew in 1948, the federal government sold a 76-acre chunk of the land, including a rail spur and some warehouses, back to the Segerstroms for roughly $100,000.

Later, Henry Segerstrom, as partner of C.J. Segerstrom & Sons, began planning for a major retail development in an unincorporated stretch of land owned by his family located between Santa Ana and Costa Mesa. Envisioning a thriving retail center, the project commenced in advance of the San Diego Freeway. Working closely with Mayor Alvin Pinkley, the Segerstroms agreed to lease water rights to Costa Mesa and in exchange, the town would pay fees equal to the municipal taxes, guaranteeing ample revenues to Costa Mesa from what would become South Coast Plaza.

== Legacy ==
Construction began on the South Coast Plaza mall began in 1967. The enormous shopping center is one of the highest grossing in the US, with over 300 stores and around one and a half billion dollars in annual sales. The family also owns land rights to much of the commercial office space around the mall. The family's monetary donations provided for the construction of the Orange County Performing Arts Center, on land donated by the family/company. Besides the performing arts center the family/company donates to the Newport-Mesa school district. Though they have sold the property rights to the residential areas south of the 405 Freeway, they retain the mineral rights.

In September 2006, the Segerstroms opened a new concert hall, the Renée and Henry Segerstrom Concert Hall. The family has also recently opened a high school near South Coast Plaza, Segerstrom High, in the Santa Ana Unified School District. Plans are underway to construct a church across the street from the high school.

== Related links ==
http://www.ocpac.org

https://www.southcoastplaza.com
