= List of people from Costa Mesa, California =

This is a list of notable residents of Costa Mesa, California.

== Notable people ==
- Rony Argueta, soccer player
- Mike Barrowman, Olympic swimmer
- Jay Bentley, bassist with Bad Religion
- Kathryn Card, actress, died in Costa Mesa
- Cris Crotz, actress, former Miss Nevada
- Sharon Day-Monroe, Olympic high jumper
- Lon Milo Duquette, occultist, writer and musician
- James Gammon, actor (part-time resident; died there)
- Jake Gibb, beach volleyball Olympian
- The Growlers, rock band
- Laurie Hernandez, Olympic gymnast
- Dave Hester, star of A&E TV's Storage Wars
- Blake Hunt, Major League Baseball catcher
- Mitchell Hurwitz, creator of the sitcom Arrested Development and co-creator of The Ellen Show
- Tom Jancar, contemporary art dealer, Jancar Kuhlenschmidt Gallery
- Jake Knapp, golfer, PGA Tour player, 2024 Mexico Open Champion
- Mitch Lucker, vocalist of deathcore band Suicide Silence (buried there)
- Bill Madden, singer-songwriter and musician (former resident)
- Misty May-Treanor, three-time Olympic gold- medalist in beach volleyball
- Tarek El Moussa, star of HGTV's Flip or Flop
- Xeno Müller, Olympic gold and silver medalist in rowing (single sculls)
- Mike Ness, singer and guitarist of the punk band Social Distortion (former resident)
- Of Mice & Men, metalcore band
- Jaime Pressly, actress, went to CMHS
- Kyla Ross, gymnast
- Philip Sahagun, martial arts champion, Cirque Du Soleil artist and coach
- Jesse Sapolu, former NFL player
- Fanny Bixby Spencer, philanthropist and antiwar activist
- Jason Thornberry, author (former resident)
- Alex Varkatzas, metalcore band Atreyu's former frontman and half of the project I Am War
- Brett Young, country singer, went to Calvary Chapel Costa Mesa
- Tyler Rust, former WWE pro-wrestler
