= Otherside Farms =

Medical cannabis information center

- Company type: Private
- Founded: Costa Mesa, California (2010)
- Founder: Alysha McKeen; Chadd McKeen
- Headquarters: Costa Mesa, CA, United States
- Website: othersidefarms.com

Otherside Farms is a medical cannabis information center with a separate division serving as a private medical cannabis collective.

== History ==
Otherside Farms Cannabis Information Center was opened around 2010 by a Newport Beach couple, Alysha and Chadd McKeen, hoping their new "medical marijuana information center" would help dissolve stigmas associated with cannabis.

I want to tell people to stop being afraid of it," Chadd McKeen, co-founder of Otherside Farms, told the Daily Pilot. We want to bring it out into the open.

The McKeens had a personal incentive to teach people about the benefits of cannabis, as Alysha had gone through cancer with the help of the plant. City officials approved the location to be legal as long as cannabis was not distributed there.

== Raid ==
In late August 2011, Otherside Farms opened a private collective, maintaining it as a separate entity from Otherside Farms. On January 17, 2012, the private collective was raided by federal officials. Controversy ensued over the raid, as city officials had secretly authorized a letter seeking federal law enforcement assistance in shutting down the collective, which an expert claimed was illegal. The basis for the raid was an accusation by a city inspector claiming that Chadd McKeen hoped to profit from his business. McKeen denied the accusation, stating that his words were misconstrued, and that Otherside Farms had been trying to communicate a plan to help resolve the Cosa Mesa budget deficit that had been present since 2010, only for meeting requests to be turned down by city officials.
