= Segerström (surname) =

Segerström is a Swedish surname that may refer to

- Bibbi Segerström (1943–2014), Swedish swimmer
- Evald Segerström (1902–1985), Swedish race walker
- Henry Segerstrom (1923–2015), American philanthropist, entrepreneur and patron of the arts
- Michael Segerström (born 1944), Swedish actor and director
- Pontus Segerström (1981–2014), Swedish football player
- Stina Segerström (born 1982), Swedish football defender
