= South Coast Plaza =

Shopping mall in Costa Mesa, California, United States

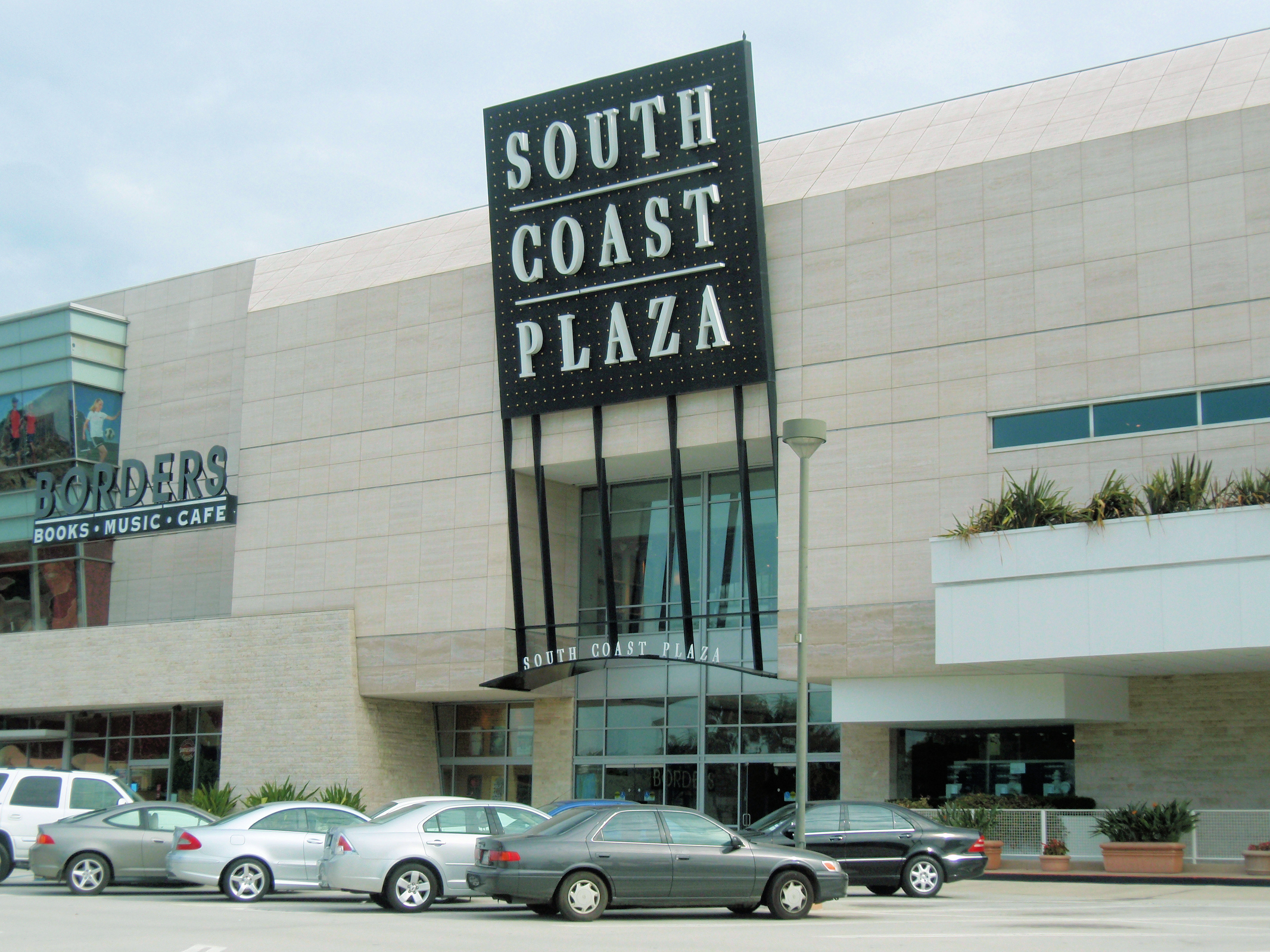
- One of the shopping center's west entrances
- Location: Costa Mesa, California, U.S.
- Coordinates: 33°41′28″N 117°53′22″W
- Address: 3333 Bristol Street, Costa Mesa, CA 92626
- Opened: March 15, 1967; 59 years ago
- Developer: C.J. Segerstrom & Sons
- Owner: Segerstrom family
- Architect: Victor Gruen Associates
- Num. of stores: 270+ (as of 2018)
- Num. of anchor tenants: 7 (5 open, 2 vacant)
- Floor area: 2,800,000 square feet (260,000 m^{2})
- Floors: 3
- Parking: Parking lot, parking garage
- Website: www.southcoastplaza.com

South Coast Plaza in Costa Mesa, California is the largest shopping mall in California and the 6th largest mall in the United States. Before the COVID-19 pandemic, its sales volume of over $1.5 billion annually was the highest in the US. The mall is anchored by three Macy's stores, Nordstrom, and Bloomingdale's. There are two vacant anchor stores, formerly occupied by Saks Fifth Avenue and Sears. The mall's 275 retailers represent the highest concentration of fashion retail in the country.

== History ==
South Coast Plaza was developed by the Segerstrom family, most notably, Harold (Hal) T. Segerstrom Jr. and cousin, Henry Segerstrom, in one of the family's lima bean fields in rapidly growing Orange County. The mall's May Company anchor store opened first, on February 21, 1966. The mall itself opened a year later, on March 15, 1967, with a second anchor store, Sears, at the other end. The initial phase of the center was designed by Victor Gruen. It was built the same year as The Irvine Company's nearby Fashion Island in Newport Beach.

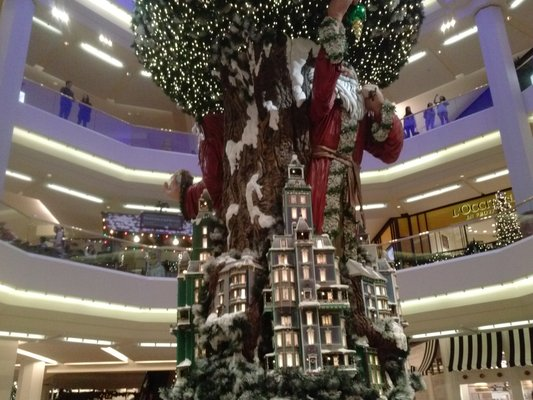
The Crystal Court portion of South Coast Plaza in Costa Mesa during the holiday season

The success of South Coast Plaza brought rapid expansion: an additional wing with Bullock's in 1973, I. Magnin in 1977, Nordstrom in 1978, and Saks Fifth Avenue in 1979. The opening of the Nordstrom store is considered a seminal event as it was the first Nordstrom store outside of the Pacific Northwest and marked the West Coast and later the nationwide expansion of its chain.

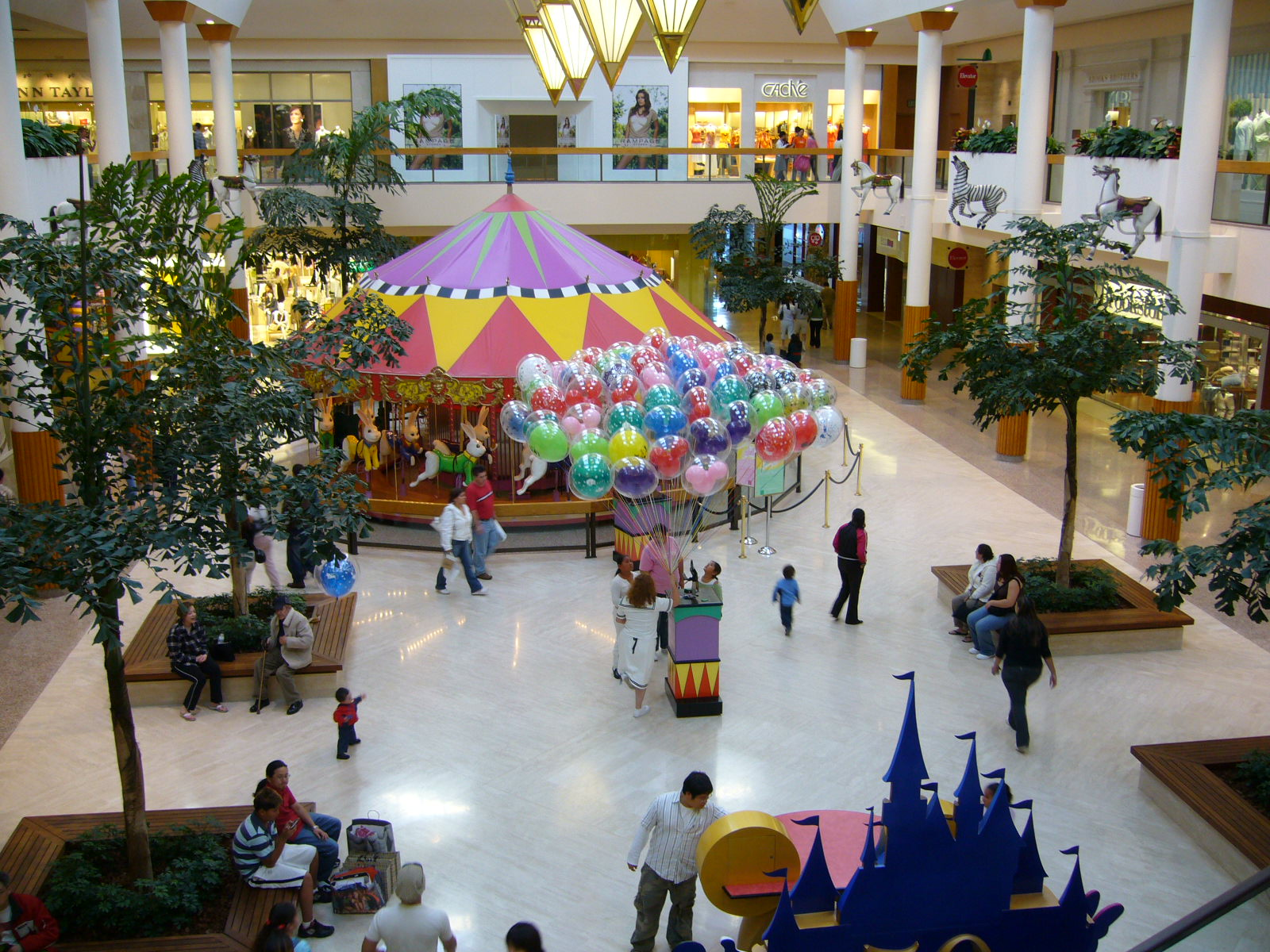
The mall's center court

In 1986, the center began opening its largest expansion, with Nordstrom replacing its store with a new location twice the size of the original in May, and the addition of a free-standing wing across Bear Street, identified as "Crystal Court" and anchored by The Broadway and J. W. Robinson's, which opened in the Fall. These two stores were anchors at nearby Fashion Island, but were willing to cannibalize sales at that location due to the strong drawing power of South Coast Plaza. This signified South Coast Plaza's elevation from a regional shopping center to a national shopping destination. The expansion continued in fall 1987 with an enlargement of Bullock's and the redevelopment of the former Nordstrom as additional center space, including a Tiffany's that opened in fall 1988. The Crystal Court standalone wing never performed as well as the original center, its separation due both to land restrictions and the fact that May Co. and The Broadway routinely refused to allow each other to build stores at their existing centers, which explains the proximity of so many competing malls throughout Southern California.

In 1991, the I. Magnin location was closed by I. Magnin's new owner, FDS (Federated Department Stores) and reopened as the first standalone Bullock's Men's store, also owned by FDS. May Co. and Robinson's merged in 1993 to form Robinsons-May, retaining both locations as separate full-line stores, while the two Bullock's locations and Broadway store were all renamed Macy's in early 1996, with again like Robinsons-May, separate stores being maintained on either side of Bear Street. In 1995, prior to the Federated Department Stores/Broadway Stores merger, Bloomingdale's was in negotiations to build a location at South Coast Plaza, but other anchor tenants would not give permission for its construction. When FDS merged all the stores into its Macy's West division in 1996, it opted to not convert Broadway's Crystal Court location to Bloomingdale's.

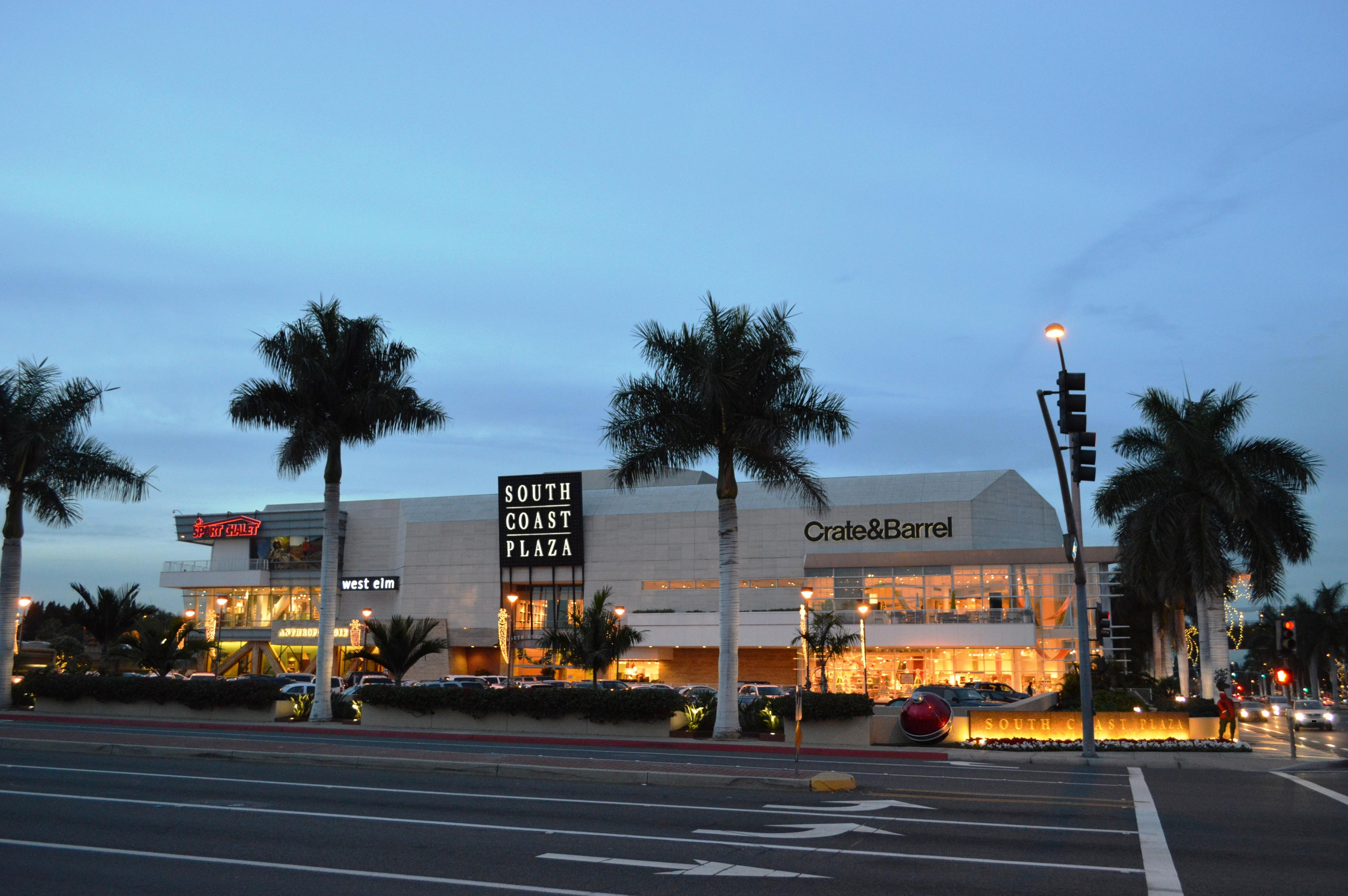
The West Wing during the 2013 holiday season

Another $100,000,000 renovation and reconfiguring of the center came in 2000, with Robinsons-May closing its Crystal Court location and expanding the original May Co. store. The separate Crystal Court name was dropped and the free-standing wing, now called the west wing, was joined to the original center by a 600-foot (180 m)-long pedestrian bridge across Bear Street. The west side was reoriented toward home furnishings, anchored by the former Broadway store, which was refurbished as Macy's Home and Furniture. The former J. W. Robinson's store was redeveloped as center space at the time, housing primarily Crate & Barrel, Borders Books and Music, and Sport Chalet.

In March 2006, the Robinsons-May store, historically the first store at South Coast Plaza as the May Company, was closed as part of its merger with Macy's and reopened as Bloomingdale's in May 2007.

South Coast Plaza is still privately held by the Segerstrom family (and the second largest family-owned center in the United States behind the Mall of America), and so is one of the few shopping centers in the United States that have not been purchased by a real estate investment trust/REIT.

Sandra (Sandy) Segerstrom Daniels a Managing Partner of C. J. Segerstrom & Sons, founded the Festival of Children Foundation in 2002. The foundation hosts the annual Festival of Children at South Coast Plaza each September.

Festival of Children coincides with the foundation's efforts to recognize September as National Child Awareness Month.

== Architecture ==
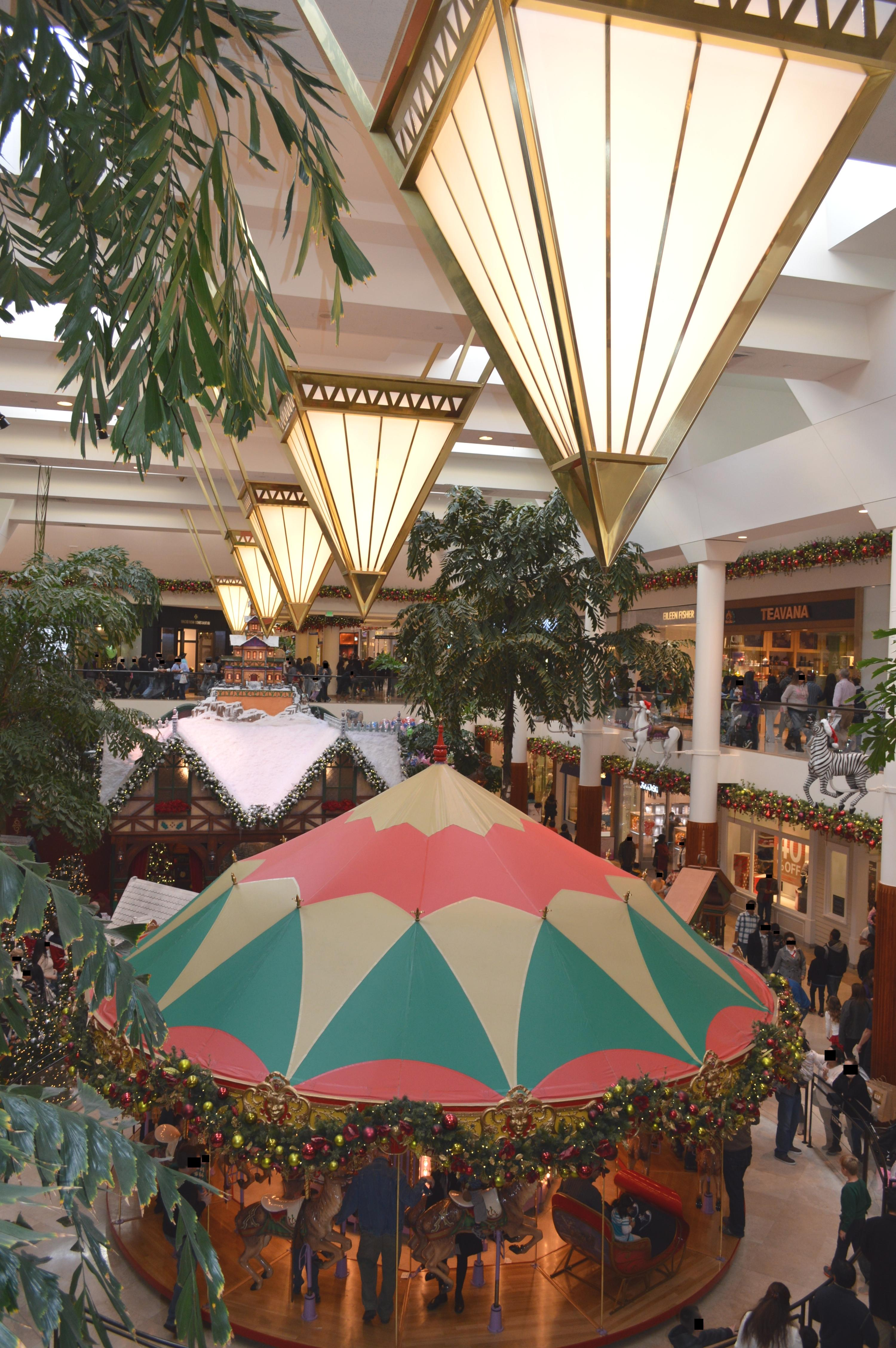
Pyramid-shaped chandeliers

South Coast Plaza has always had a strong design element in its building. One of the most striking additions to the mall was the angular 1973 Bullock's wing designed by Welton Becket and the 1977 I. Magnin wing designed by Frank Gehry. In 1982, Henry Segerstrom commissioned the sculptor, Isamu Noguchi, to design a small plaza at one end of the South-Coast facility. The result, "California Scenario" was an international prizewinner and is enjoyed by visitors and workers from the surrounding office buildings alike. The 1986–1987 expansion introduced postmodern architecture to the mall with a recurring pyramid motif. Chandeliers took the shape of inverted pyramids, and the escalator atrium leading to the center's third floor is loosely modeled after the Grand Gallery of the Pyramid of Khufu. The original Mid-Century modern exteriors of Sears and May Company were redesigned shortly thereafter. In 2000, the pedestrian bridge, known as Bridge of Gardens, and accompanying Garden Terrace were completed by landscape architect Kathryn Gustafson. There are also carousels placed in wide rest areas.

In 2006, Anton Segerstrom decided that the center was well overdue for a remodeling and brought in Bentley Management Group as the project manager and Gruen Associates as the architect. Howard S. Wright was selected as the general contractor and construction began in summer 2006 on a $30 million remodeling project to update the center. South Coast Plaza underwent an intense makeover, with Italian ivory marble replacing the original burgundy tile floors, and travertine to surround new water and fountain features. Modern and contemporary oil-rubbed bronze replaced the dated brass side railings and all door/elevator hardware including a glass elevator. Construction began in the Bloomingdale's wing, and was completed in time for the 40th anniversary of South Coast Plaza, in the fall of 2007, just one year later. This is the largest remodel for the center since the construction of the Bridge of Gardens connecting the main building with the Crystal Court in 1999, and the exterior/interior remodel of the West building.

== Amenities ==
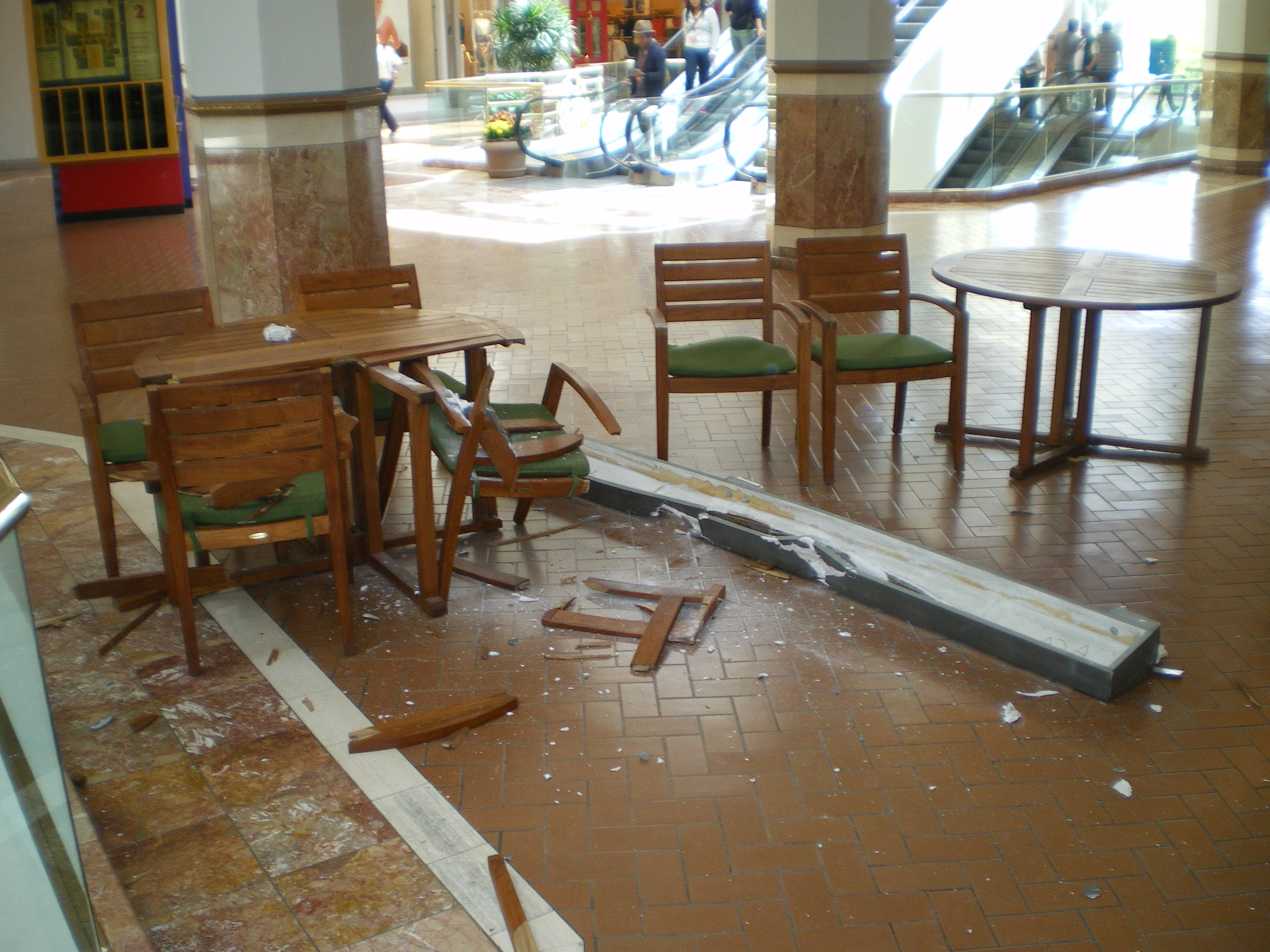
Damage at South Coast Plaza caused by the 2008 Chino Hills earthquake

South Coast Plaza continuously brings in approximately 24 million visitors annually. The shopping center has about 2.8 million square feet (260 thousand square meters) of gross leasable area and over 270 stores, making it one of the largest shopping centers in the United States. Its stores generate revenue of roughly 2.5 billion dollars per year, making it the highest-grossing center in the United States.

In 2004, South Coast Plaza received the Federal Trademark as "The Ultimate Shopping Resort."

A number of luxury brands have chosen South Coast Plaza as one of their few (and for some brands, their only) store locations. Zara made its debut in the California market opening their first California store in South Coast Plaza in 2004. In 2005, French luxury design house Chloé opted to open their second United States boutique at South Coast Plaza. Watch manufacturer Rolex opened their flagship U.S. location at South Coast Plaza. Purveyor of modern furniture Room & Board also opened a 40,000-square-foot (3,700 m^{2}) showroom in 2002.

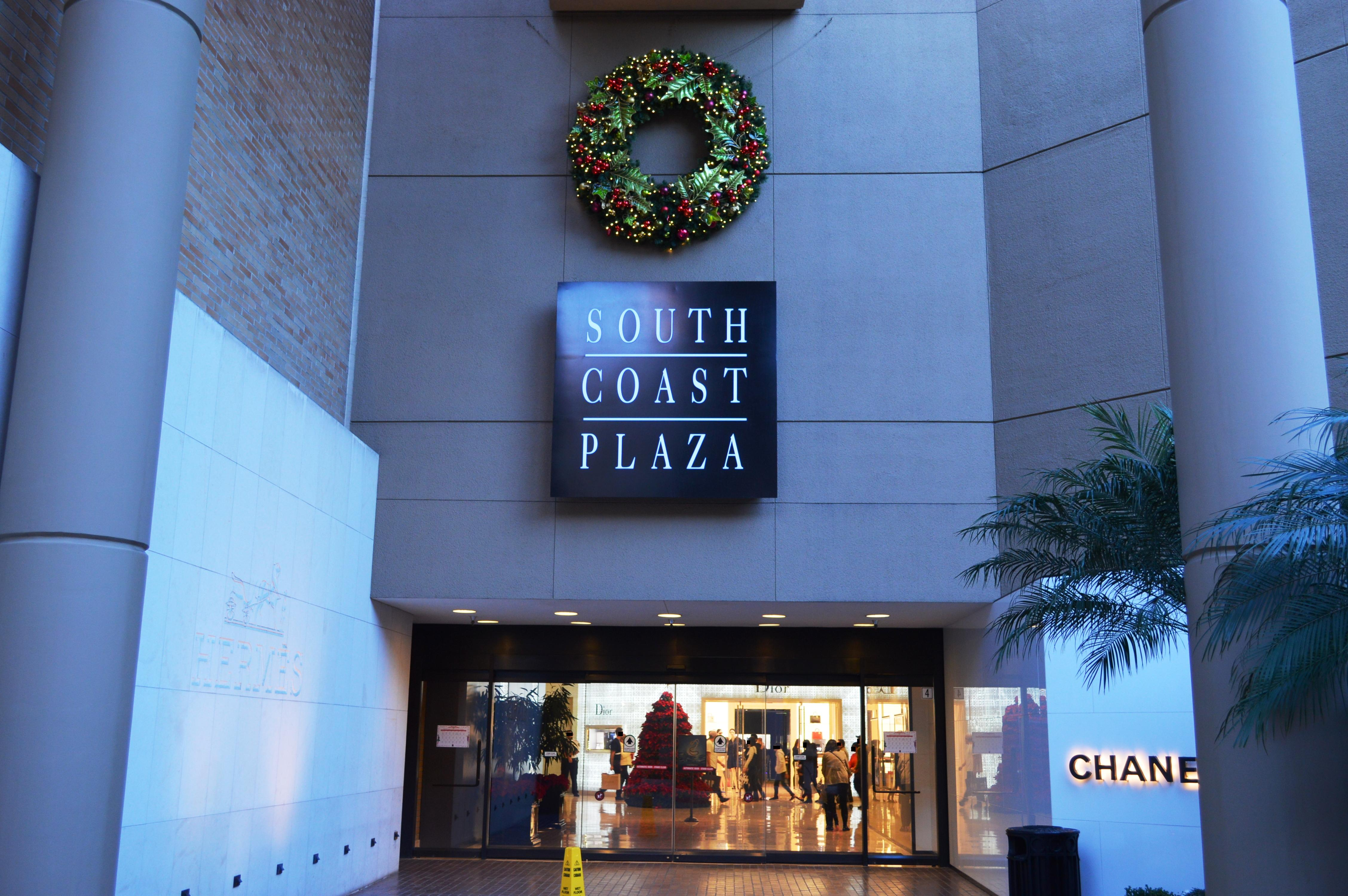
A mall entrance near Chanel, Dior and Hermès, decorated for the 2013 holiday season

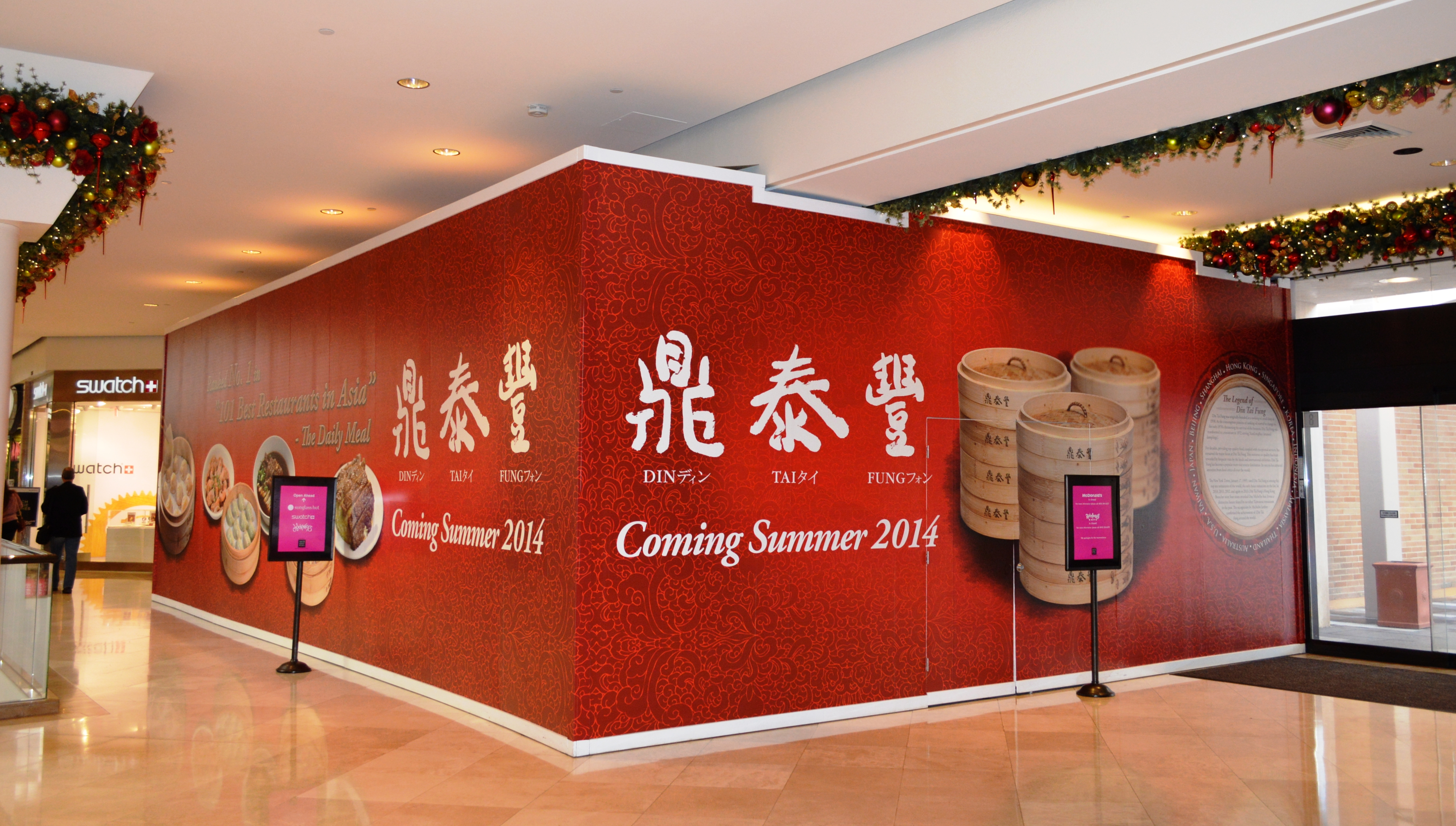
Din Tai Fung occupies McDonald's former site.

Since 2007, South Coast Plaza has held "Fashion Plates", an annual 10-day Restaurant Week-like promotion of its high-end restaurants at discounted rates.

In 2014, Taiwan-based chain Din Tai Fung opened a location in the Sears Wing.

In 2016, Italian designer brand, WEEKEND MaxMara, opened its freestanding store in California.

In July 2017, the Sears store was sold to the mall owners. On October 15, 2018, it was announced that Sears would be closing as part of a plan to close 142 stores nationwide. The Sears anchor was closed permanently on January 1, 2019, making it the last original anchor store to close in the mall.

In 2019, Furla opened a new store at South Coast Plaza. This was the company's first store to open in California.

In August 2020, South Coast Plaza reopened after an extended closure due to COVID-19 with additional safety measures, including social distancing requirements and more frequent cleaning of this.

In 2021, new stores that opened included Thom Browne, Ganni, Untuckit, Louis Vuitton, Psycho Bunny, Loewe, Sock Harbor, and Nectar Bath Treats.

In late 2023, Balmain opened its flagship store in the mall. In November, Paris-based brand Balenciaga also unveiled its flagship location in the mall, with the new store occupying over 9,500 square feet of space across two stories.

In early 2024, it was announced that over thirty new brands, including Alaia, Amiri, Mejuri, and Santa Maria Novella, would open locations in the mall. A new Giorgio Armani boutique was also announced alongside plans for an Armani/Caffè location to replace the Antonello Espresso Cafe. In February 2024, Palm Angels opened a location in the former Sears Wing, now known as the Din Tai Fung Wing.

In November 2024, Belgian heritage leather goods brand Delvaux opened its first boutique in Southern California, with over 3,000 handbag designs.

On March 6, 2026, Saks Global announced the closure of 12 Saks Fifth Avenue and 3 Neiman Marcus locations nationwide in an effort to further cut costs and focus on more profitable locations, including the Saks store at South Coast Plaza.

Barnes & Noble is building a 27,000 sq-ft single-story bookstore, company-branded B&N Café, and an exterior patio.

== Location ==
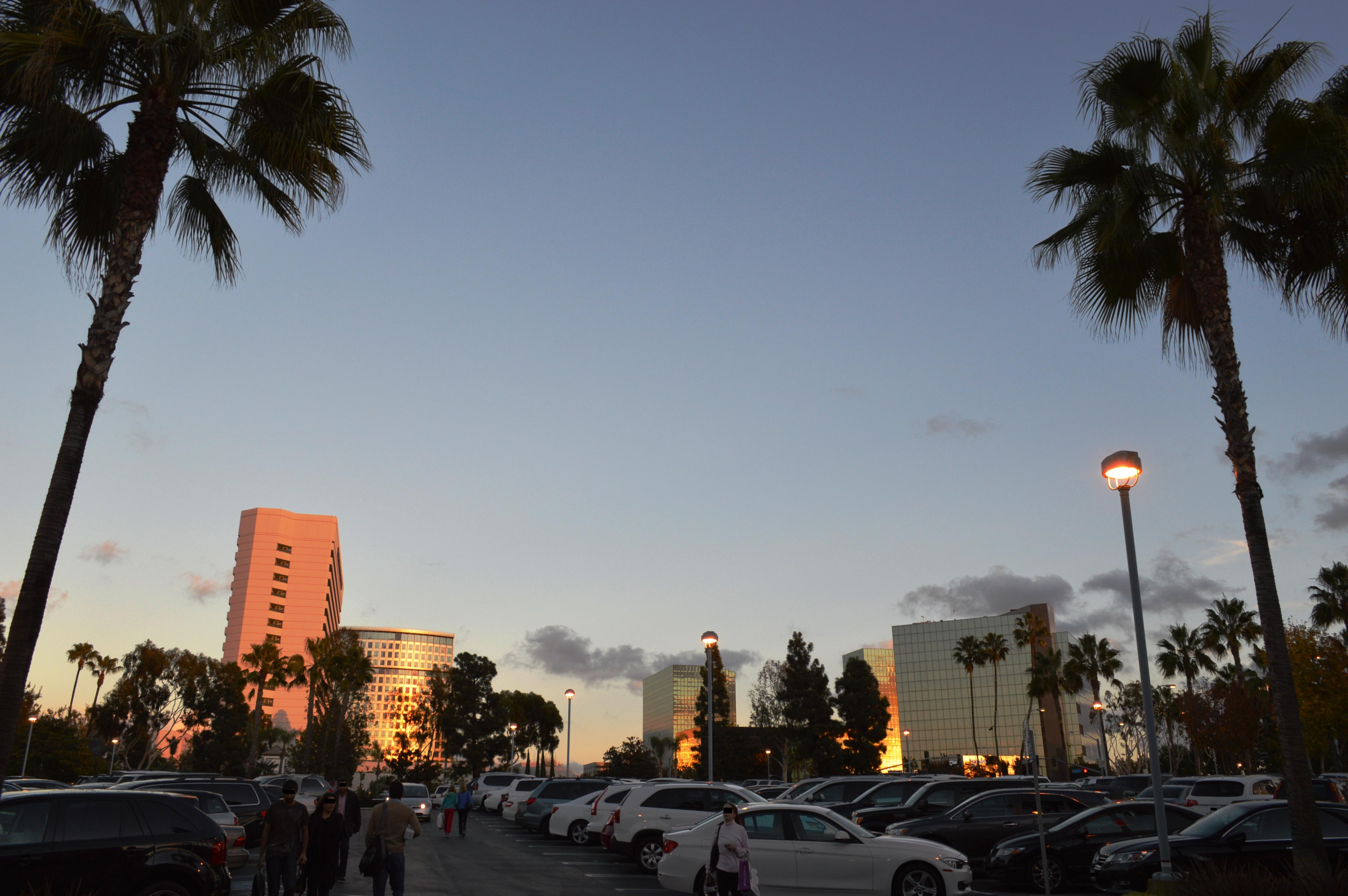
High-rise buildings across Bristol Street

The center is adjacent to Interstate 405 in the South Coast Metro area, which includes portions of the cities of Costa Mesa and Santa Ana.

== See also ==
- List of the world's largest shopping malls
- List of largest shopping malls in the United States
