= Wahoo's Fish Taco =

American restaurant chain

- Type: Private
- Industry: Restaurants
- Founded: Costa Mesa, California (1988; 38 years ago)
- Founder: Eduardo Lee, Mingo Lee and Wing Lam
- Headquarters: 1185 Warner Avenue, Tustin, California, U.S.
- Website: wahoos.com

Wahoo's Fish Taco is a U.S.-based restaurant chain that offers Mexican food mixed with Brazilian and Asian flavors. Categorized as a "fast casual restaurant", the quality and preparation time of its food is between that of a fast-food restaurant and a more formal restaurant. Wahoo's provides many vegetarian and some vegan options, such as tofu, banzai veggies and brown rice, and also provides a kids' meal menu. They serve wahoo fish in their tacos, as well as Mahi-mahi.

== History ==
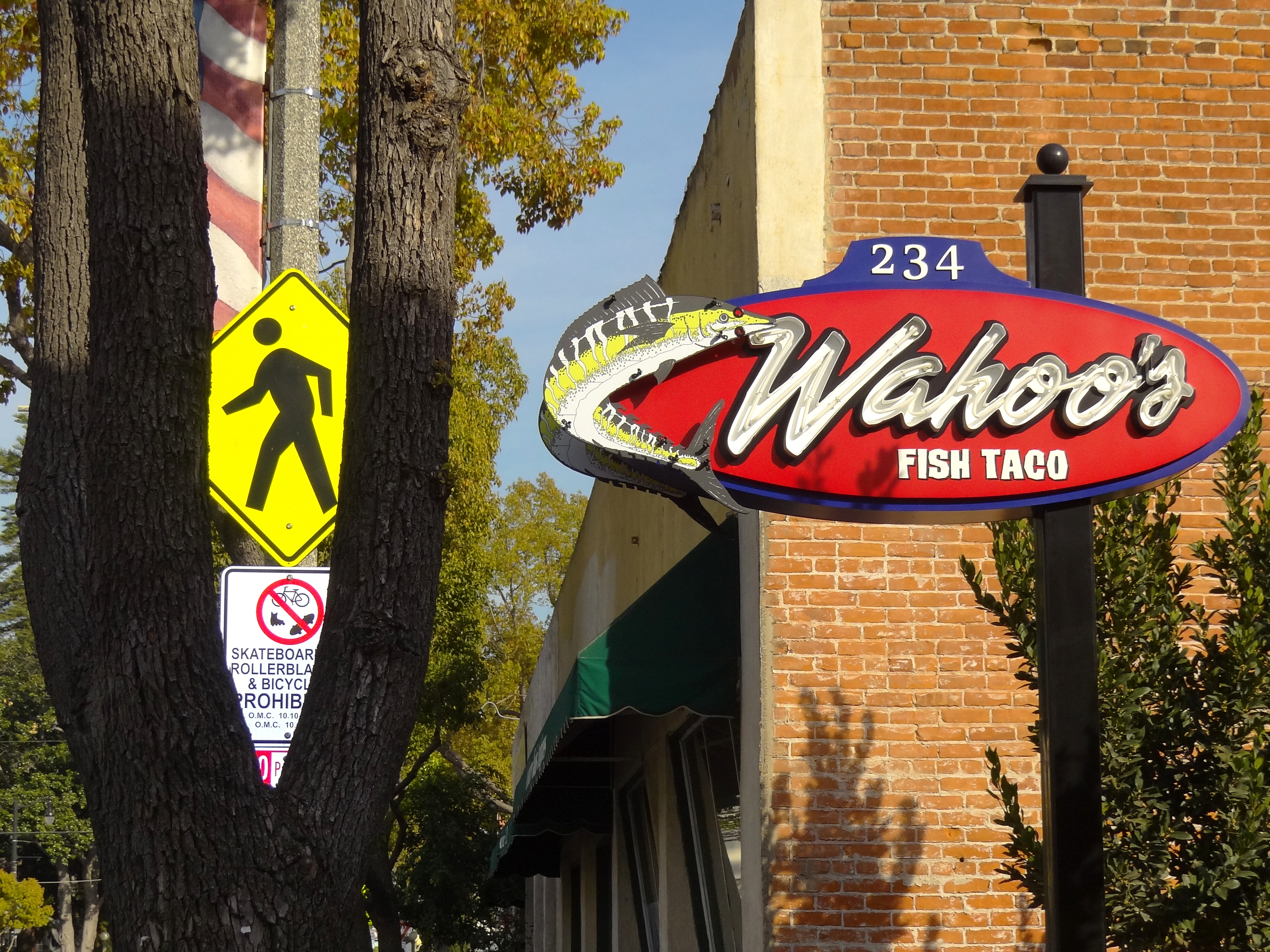
Wahoo's Fish Taco sign in Orange, California

Wahoo's was founded in Costa Mesa, California, in 1988 by Chinese-Brazilian brothers Eduardo "Ed" Lee, Renato "Mingo" Lee and Wing Lam, who mixed traditional Chinese and Brazilian flavors with dishes they encountered while traveling in Mexico. Their parents had fled to Brazil in the 1950s following the conclusion of the Chinese Civil War, and settled in São Paulo, opening a Chinese restaurant; their five sons were all born in Brazil. Their father, Cheong Lee, and the eldest brother came to the United States in 1964, and the rest of the family arrived in 1975, opening the Shanghai Pine Gardens restaurant on Balboa Island. Based on their experience working long hours at Shanghai Pine Gardens, the parents insisted that their five children should study medicine, law, or engineering; the eldest brother went to law school, the second brother studied medicine, and the third brother (Wing Lam) attended San Diego State University, initially studying engineering, but switching to finance after being placed on academic probation.

The first Wahoo's Fish Taco restaurant, located at 1862 Placentia Avenue in Costa Mesa, opened in November 1988, serving Baja California-style fish tacos. The three brothers (youngest of the five sons) were the main restaurant employees. Wing Lam recounted in 2011 that "back in the day, I took your order, ran to the kitchen, made it and delivered it to your table." The three brothers remain involved in daily operations, with Wing Lam staffing the chain's California-based food truck. The first restaurant was funded in part with US$30,000 the brothers received from their parents after selling Shanghai Pine Gardens.

Steve Karfaridis, the first manager of Wahoo's second location, in Laguna Beach, is now a partner in the business. The corporate headquarters are in Santa Ana, California. The three brothers are still involved with the company, with Wing Lam acting as the public face of the company, working in public relations and marketing. Projected sales in 2004 were US$35,000,000 (equivalent to $59,660,000 in 2025). By 2011, annual sales exceeded US$60,000,000 (equivalent to $85,870,000 in 2025).

=== Expansion ===
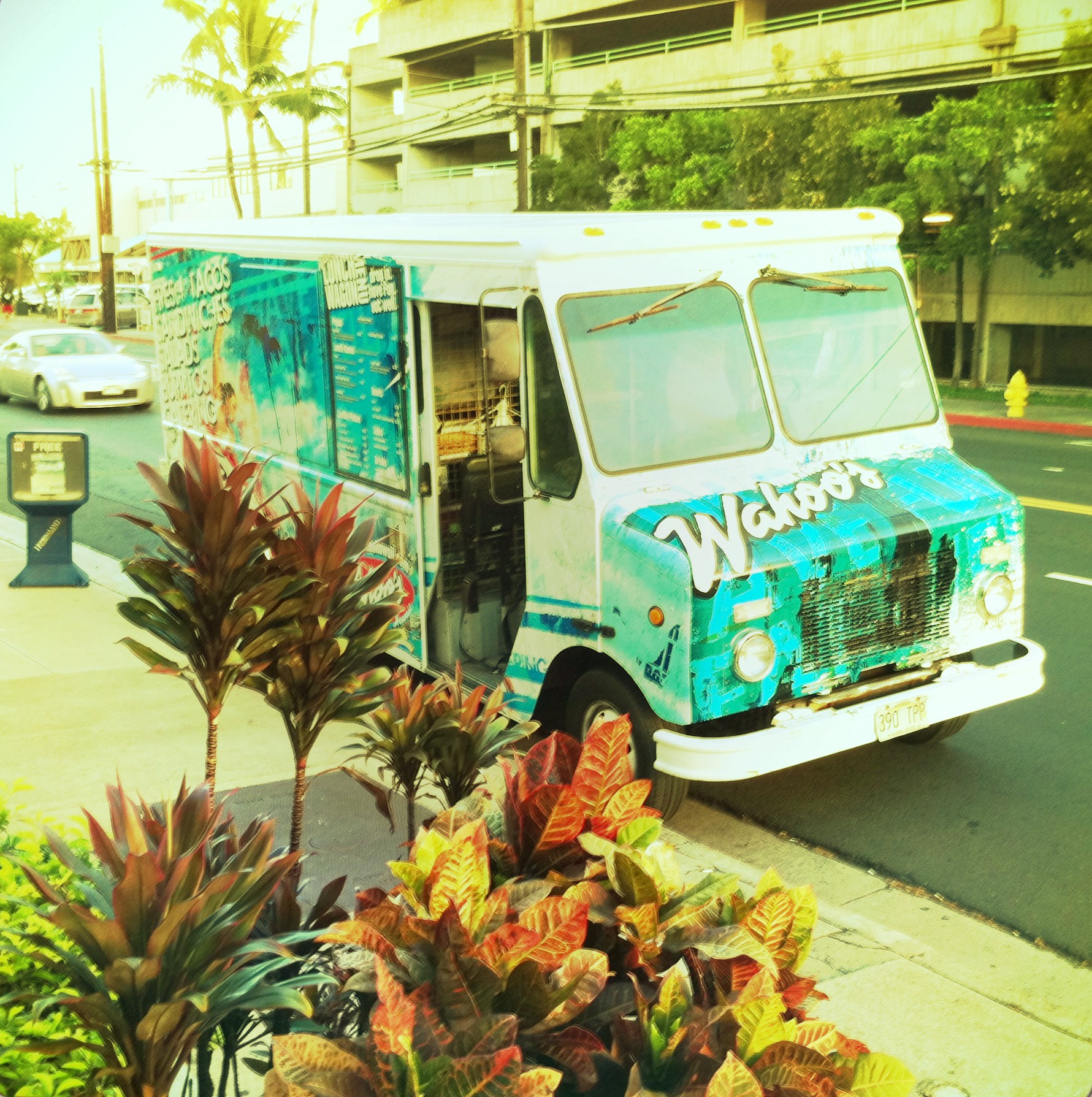
Wahoo's also operates a food truck in Hawaii.

By 1994, Wahoo's had opened two additional locations, one each in Costa Mesa and Laguna Beach. The business permit for the fourth location in Huntington Beach, was delayed over a city code requirement to pay for 12 spaces in the city-owned Main Street parking garage, and an additional location was opened in Lake Forest in May 1994. By late 1995, Wahoo's had six locations in total, five in Orange County, California and one in Denver, Colorado. The Wahoo's that opened in Manhattan Beach in 1998 was the first Wahoo's in California outside Orange County. In 2001, Wahoo's had 22 locations and announced plans to open 40 more by 2006. By 2005, Wahoo's had 36 locations, including the original Costa Mesa restaurant.

Wahoo's has since expanded across California and has opened locations in Colorado, Hawaii, Nebraska, Nevada, New Jersey & Pennsylvania . In 2009, Wahoo's announced plans to add 100 franchise locations by 2014, but those plans have slowed. By Wahoo's 25-year anniversary in 2013, they had 64 restaurants in seven states, and would later that year go on to open Wahoo's first international restaurant in Tokyo, Japan.

=== California Love Drop ===
On April 12, 2020, Wahoo's delivered 300 meals to an Irvine hospital as part of California Love Drop, a collaboration between Lam and numerous partners to deliver meals to frontline workers during the COVID-19 pandemic. To date, the Love Drop has delivered over 11,000 meals.

== Marketing ==
From the outset, Wahoo's has targeted the surfing community by offering affordable prices and eclectic decor, which uses stickers and surfing equipment inside the restaurant. Wahoo's would cater corporate events for surf apparel companies and local surf contests to build word-of-mouth for its fish tacos. Similar strategies were used to build support in other "extreme" sports communities such as snowboarding, rock climbing, and cycling.

Wahoo's also built a strong youth following by naming a local "athlete of the week" and sponsoring a meal, which would inevitably be attended by the athlete's friends.

The fish tacos served by street vendors in Baja California were, in Lam's recollection, generally filled with unsaleable by-caught fish such as shark; the bycatch would be sold cheaply to street vendors, who sliced the fish into strips, deep fried the strips, and sold the fish in inexpensive tacos with cabbage and tomatoes. While attending San Diego State, Lam came up with the idea to replicate the fish tacos for an American audience, similar to the origin story told by Rubio's founder (and fellow Aztec alumnus) Ralph Rubio. The primary difference was the Wahoo's fish taco was prepared as his family would interpret the recipe: grilled meat, instead of fried, and beans without lard or bacon fat, with vegetarian and vegan options. The brothers' efforts to replicate street tacos with a healthy twist coincided with a renewed consumer interest in "fresh" Mexican cuisine, and Wahoo's has offered nutritional information from the start to cater to health-conscious consumers. In addition, Wahoo's has been credited as creating one of the earliest Asian-taco fusions.

Word-of-mouth from existing stores was sufficient when new Orange County locations were opened, but when Wahoo's expanded north into Manhattan Beach in Los Angeles County, the marketing effort reverted to advertising in local newspapers and schools.

== In popular culture ==
Author Earlene Fowler credits the original Wahoo's location as her office while she was writing her first novel.

January 9, 2013 was proclaimed Wahoo's Fish Taco Day in Costa Mesa to honor the chain's 25th founding anniversary.

Travis Barker, drummer for blink-182, opened a Wahoo's Fish Taco restaurant in Norco, California (co-owned with the Lee brothers) in 2004.
