= Henry Segerstrom =

American entrepreneur and philanthropist (1923–2015)

Henry T. Segerstrom
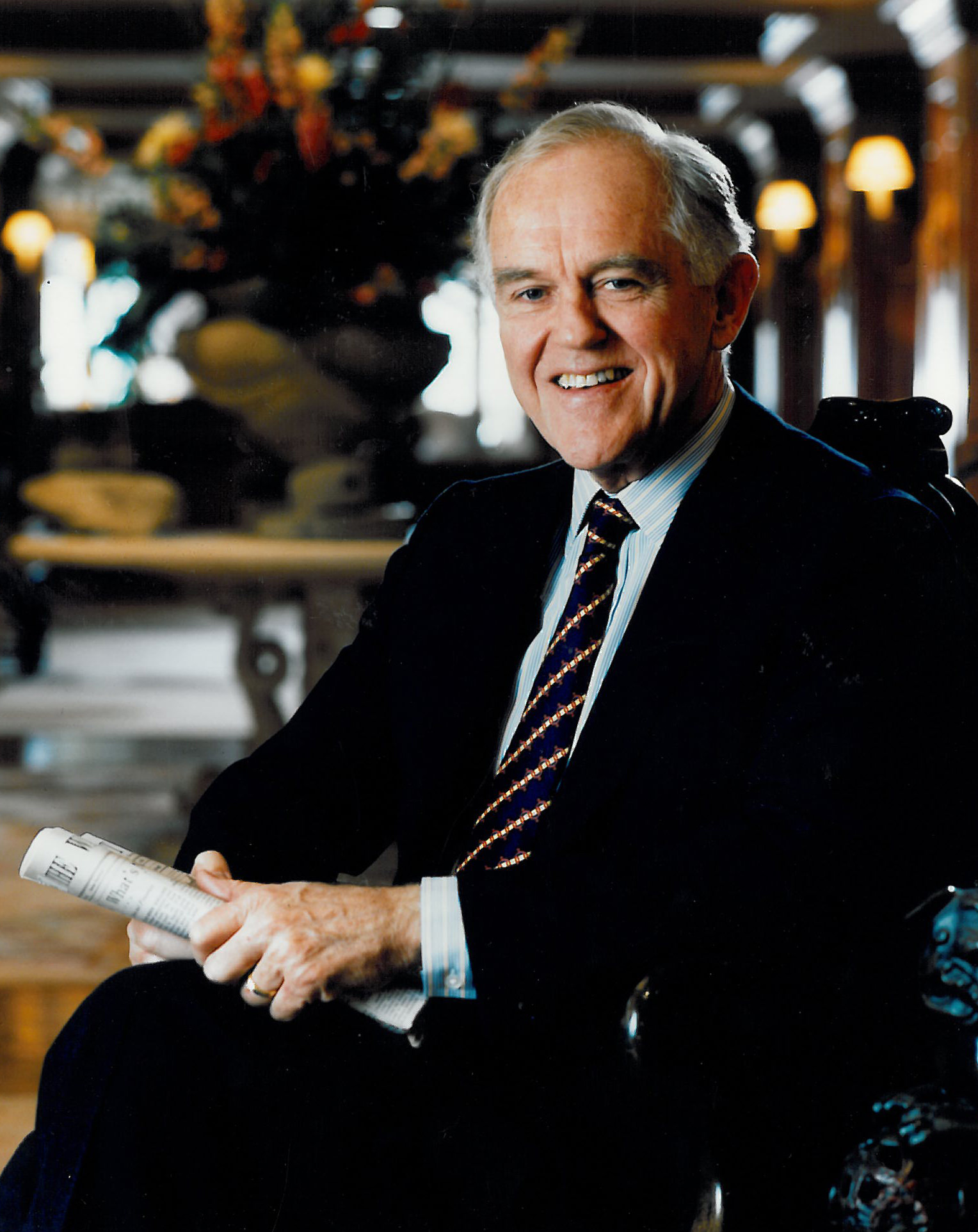
- Henry Thomas Segerstrom; Managing Partner of C.J. Segerstrom & Sons; Founding Chairman; Orange County Performing Arts Center
- Born: Henry Thomas Segerstrom; April 5, 1923; Santa Ana, California
- Died: February 20, 2015 (aged 91)
- Education: Stanford University, BA Stanford Graduate School of Business, MBA
- Occupations: Businessman, philanthropist, and arts patron
- Organization(s): Founding Chairman, Orange County Performing Arts Center, now known as the Segerstrom Center for the Arts
- Known for: Entrepreneurship, philanthropy, cultural leadership and patronage of the arts
- Spouses: Yvonne de Chavigny Perry (m. 1950; div. 1981) Renée De Troyes (m. 1982; died 2000) Elizabeth Swiecicka (m. 2000)
- Children: Toren and Anton Segerstrom and Andrea Grant
- Website: www.henrysegerstrom.com

Henry Thomas Segerstrom (April 5, 1923 – February 20, 2015) was an American philanthropist and real estate developer. The managing partner of C.J. Segerstrom & Sons, he was the founding chairman of the Orange County Performing Arts Center, now known as the Segerstrom Center for the Arts.

== Life ==
Henry Thomas Segerstrom was born into a Swedish immigrant family in Santa Ana, California. A farming family, the Segerstroms moved from dairy farming to cultivating alfalfa, eventually specializing in the production and harvesting of lima beans. They would become the largest producers of dried lima beans in the United States.

== Education ==
In 1939, Henry T. Segerstrom graduated from Santa Ana High School as valedictorian, where he also served as class president. At age 17 he enrolled in Stanford University. His education was interrupted by World War II; he joined the war effort after Pearl Harbor, in 1942. After the war he returned to Stanford, where he graduated with a Bachelor of Arts degree and a Masters of Business Administration from Stanford Business School in 1948. In February 2008, Stanford University presented him with the Ernest C. Arbuckle Award for his lifetime of outstanding accomplishments.

== Military service ==
Enlisting in the U.S. Army on June 24, 1942, Henry T. Segerstrom was commissioned a second lieutenant upon graduation from the Field Artillery Officer Candidate School at Fort Sill, Oklahoma on May 27, 1944. He was deployed to the European front as a second lieutenant, later rising to the rank of captain. In France, he was severely wounded in action during the Battle of the Bulge. He then returned to California to recover at Dibble General Hospital in Menlo Park. In 1945, Segerstrom was awarded the Purple Heart and the European Theater of Operations Ribbon with Battle Star. He remained on active duty until 1947.

== Business career ==
As managing partner of the family-owned company, C.J. Segerstrom & Sons, a commercial real estate and retail management firm established in 1898, he spearheaded commercial development in Orange County, California. Under his guidance, C.J. Segerstrom and Sons developed the area that became South Coast Metro.

In 1962 C.J. Segerstrom & Sons hired a land-planning consultant to lobby state highway planners to reroute the southern section of the San Diego Freeway (the 405) through Segerstrom property, the future home of the retail site they planned to develop. This freeway would provide hundreds of thousands of Southern California residents easy access between Los Angeles and San Diego.

Henry Segerstrom hired the architectural firm Victor Gruen Associated to design the expansion of the Center. In March 1967, Henry T. Segerstrom, along with his cousin Hal T. Segerstrom, Jr., opened a shopping center called South Coast Plaza in one of the family's lima bean fields in rapidly growing Orange County. South Coast Plaza would become one of the highest-grossing shopping centers in America.

The Santa Ana Army Air Base was located on Segerstrom-owned land. When the government withdrew from the base in 1948, the land was returned to the family along with several warehouses the army had left behind. Under Segerstrom's advocacy, the buildings were leased to the family's first tenants; a cannery in Newport Harbor and a truck and transfer center in Anaheim. Later, when the Carnegie Library in Santa Ana was relocated, Segerstrom encouraged his family to purchase the building and surrounding property. The library was razed and the property was soon developed into what would become the region's first air-conditioned office building.

Later, Segerstrom began planning for a major retail development in an unincorporated stretch of land owned by his family located between Santa Ana and Costa Mesa. Envisioning a thriving retail center, the project commenced in advance of the San Diego Freeway. Working closely with Mayor Alvin Pinkley, the Segerstroms agreed to lease water rights to Costa Mesa and in exchange, the town would pay fees equal to the municipal taxes, guaranteeing ample revenues to Costa Mesa from what would become South Coast Plaza.

In 1949, Henry T. Segerstrom was nominated for the Agricultural Stabilization Committee, winning the chairmanship. An advocate of water reclamation and desalination, he secured agreements and obtained a $40 million grant from the federal government. In 1957, he was elected to a four-year term on the Orange County Water District Board. Re-elected six times, he served 16 years as president.

He also became a transit organizer in 1949, bringing in bus lines and advancing the development of road construction and improved traffic flow through the 1990s. Through his involvement with the Orange County Transportation Authority, he was credited as the "father of transit in the region."

Segerstrom received Lifetime Achievement or Legacy Awards -which recognize people who have made significant contributions to the regional business community- from the Orange County Business Council in 2003, the Costa Mesa Chamber of Commerce and South Coast Metro Alliance in 2013 and the Coast Magazine Community Awards in 2014.

== Cultural leadership and philanthropy ==
Segerstrom was a board member of various local, national and international institutions, serving on the boards of Bank of America, Safeco, and Southern California Edison Company, among many others. He sat on the boards of various cultural institutions including the White Nights Foundation of America, the American Friends of Versailles, the Museum of Modern Art, New York, the Museum of Contemporary Art, Los Angeles, and the Huntington Library in San Marino, California. He also served as the National Chairman of the Business Committee for the Arts, headquartered in New York City. He was involved with French-American organizations such as the Versailles Foundation, American Friends of Versailles, and American Friends of the Louvre.

By the 1940s there was considerable interest in the arts in Orange County, and it was home to many cultural institutions. However, there were no performance spaces or public art. The Segerstrom family donated five acres in 1979 to build a cultural center that would eventually house three cultural institutions in Orange County—the Philharmonic Society of Orange County, the Pacific Symphony, and the Pacific Chorale. By 1986, they all became one center, originally called the Orange County Performing Arts Center, later renamed the Segerstrom Center for the Arts.

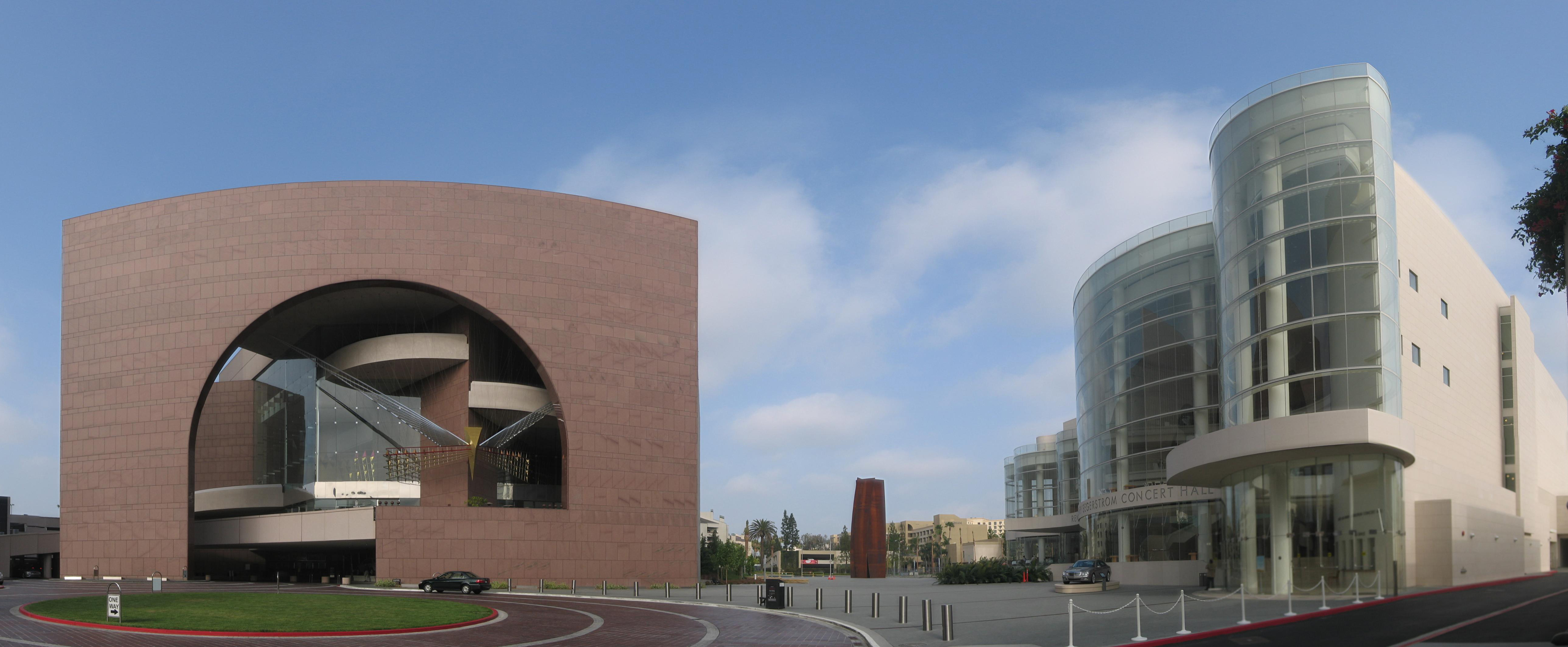
Segerstrom Concert Hall (right) and Segerstrom Hall (left) — of the Segerstrom Center for the Arts.

In 2005, a gift agreement was made for the development of the pedestrian plaza common areas located with Segerstrom Center for the Arts. As part of the Cornerstone Gift Agreement, Segerstrom initially pledged $5 million to the Circle of Honor Gift fund. He subsequently committed another $40 million to the development of the Renee and Henry Segerstrom Concert Hall and the overall Segerstrom Center for the Arts. A portion of the Circle of Honor Gift in the amount of $4 million was restricted for the sole purpose of funding construction costs for the pedestrian plaza and walkway areas of Segerstrom Center for the Arts.

An early partnership between Carnegie Hall and the Segerstrom Center for the Arts brought programming from Carnegie Hall's Ancient Paths, Modern Voices festival celebrating Chinese culture to Southern California. This resulted in a West Coast festival presented by the Philharmonic Society of Orange County and prominent partner institutions, and was the first time that Carnegie Hall's live festival programming reached audiences outside New York City. On June 7, 2010, Carnegie Hall presented him with the fourth Annual Medal of Excellence, which honors an executive whose accomplishments in the corporate sector complement Carnegie Hall's stature as one of the premier performance venues in the world.

Over his lifetime, Segerstrom donated more than $100,000 to the American Ballet Theatre toward the advancement of their global presence and for the establishment of the American Ballet Theatre's William J. Gillespie School. He also spearheaded a partnership between the ballet company and the Segerstrom Center for the Arts. For nearly every season since the Center’s inception, American Ballet Theatre has brought productions to Orange County’s audiences at Segerstrom Hall while also partnering with the center on commissions and premieres.

== Death ==
After a short illness, Segerstrom died in Newport Beach, California, on February 20, 2015, at the age of 91.

== Legacy ==
Segerstrom is recognized for his service as founding chairman of the Orange County Performing Arts Center and his role in establishing the Centre for Social Innovation at Stanford University's Graduate School of Business.

The Segerstrom Center for the Arts, Segerstrom Hall, and Segerstrom Avenue in Santa Ana are named after him. Segerstrom High School in Santa Ana, which opened in 2005, is also named after him.

In April 2023, PBS broadcast Segerstrom: Imagining the Future. The streaming production was billed as "the story of a man who believed in great possibilities and inspired those around him."

== Selected Awards ==
Throughout his life, from 1971 when he was inducted into the U.S. Army Artillery Hall of Fame, to January 2024 when he was one of ten individuals inducted into the Orange County Hall of Fame, Henry T. Segerstrom was the recipient of many honors and awards. He was awarded an Honorary Doctor of Laws at Western State University (1986) and Whittier Law School (2002). In 1988 he received the Honorary title of Commander and bestowed with the Order of the Polar Star by King Carl XVI Gustaf of Sweden. In 1995, he was presented the Tree of Life Award of the Jewish National Fund by Margaret Thatcher for his efforts in developing desalination plants in Southern California.

== Bibliography ==
David Finn and Judith A. Jedlicka, The Art of Leadership: Building Business-Arts Alliances (Abbeville Press, 1999) Pages mentioned: 1, 21, 60-65
ISBN 0-7892-0566-1

Janet E. Graebner, Orange County, an economic celebration (Windsor Publishing, 1988).
ISBN 0897812433

Richard W. Keusink, Fire Mission: 109 The history of Stanford University's Class of 1944, Officer Candidate Class 109 and the experiences of its members in World War II (R.W. Keusink and R.I. Farrar, 1999)
ASIN: B0006RQ01A

Bonnie Rychlak, Henry T. Segerstrom: The courage of imagination and the development of the arts in Southern California. (New York and Paris: Assouline, 2013). ISBN 9781614281047

Kerry Swank, Orange County Today: A Place Like No Other (Pioneer Publications, 1995)
ISBN 1-881547-20-5
