= Costa Mesa, California =

City in California, United States

- City
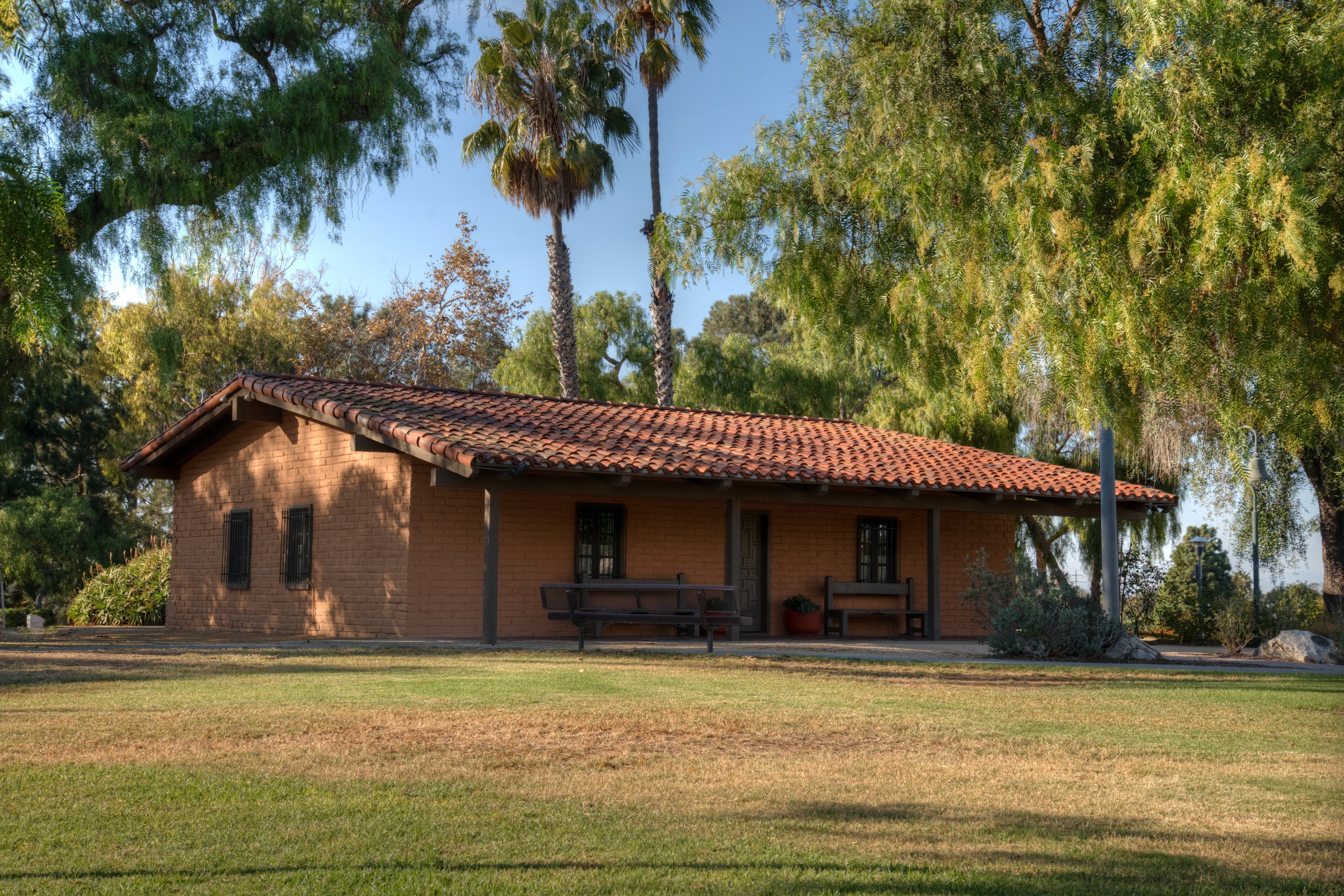
- Diego Sepúlveda Adobe

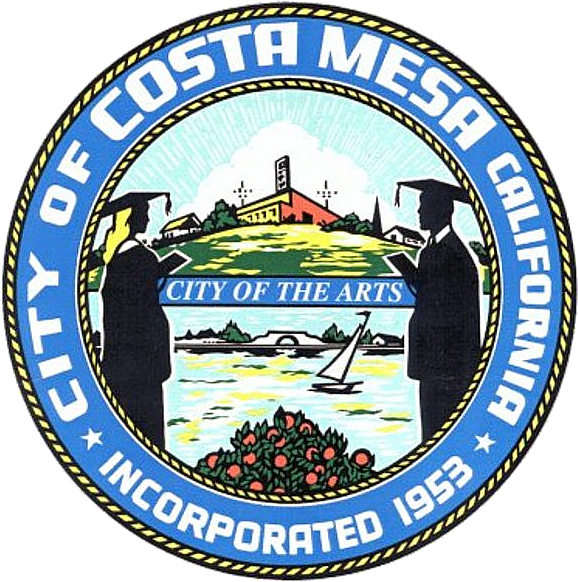
- Flag Seal
- Nickname: Goat Hill
- Motto: "City of the Arts"
- Interactive map of Costa Mesa, California
- Location within Greater Los Angeles Location in California Location in the United States
- Coordinates: 33°39′54″N 117°54′44″W
- Country: United States
- State: California
- County: Orange
- Incorporated: June 29, 1953

Government
  - Type: Council-manager
  - Mayor: John Stephens
  - Mayor Pro Tem: Manuel Chavez
  - City Council: Mike Buley; Loren Gameros; Andrea Marr; Arlis Reynolds; Jeff Pettis
  - City Manager: Cecilia Gallardo-Daly

Area
  - Total: 15.81 sq mi (40.96 km^{2})
  - Land: 15.81 sq mi (40.94 km^{2})
  - Water: 0.0077 sq mi (0.02 km^{2}) 0.29%
- Elevation: 98 ft (30 m)

Population (2020)
  - Total: 111,918
  - Rank: 8th in Orange County; 63rd in California
  - Density: 7,080.6/sq mi (2,733.85/km^{2})
- Demonym: Costa Mesan
- Time zone: UTC−8 (PST)
  - Summer (DST): UTC−7 (PDT)
- ZIP Codes: 92626–92628
- Area code: 714/657/949
- FIPS code: 06-16532
- GNIS feature IDs: 1652692, 2410239
- Website: costamesaca.gov

Costa Mesa (/ˌkoʊstə ˈmeɪsə/ KOH-stə MAY-sə; Spanish for 'Mesa Coast') is a city in Orange County, California, United States. Since its incorporation in 1953, the city has grown from a semi-rural farming community of 16,840 to an urban area including part of the South Coast Plaza–John Wayne Airport edge city, one of the region's largest commercial clusters, with an economy based on retail, commerce, and light manufacturing. The population was 111,918 at the 2020 census.

== History ==
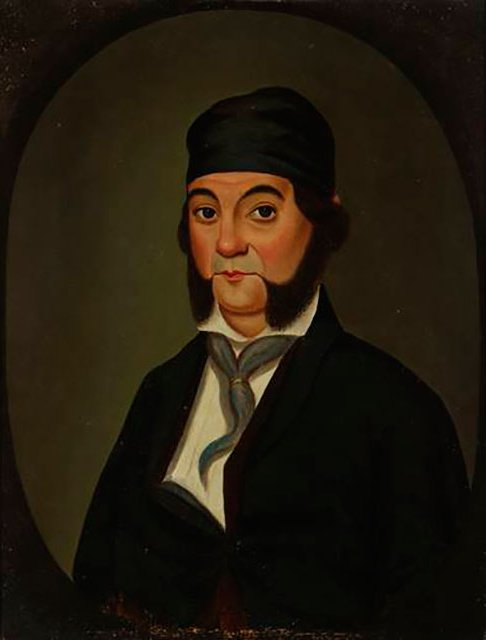
Don Bernardo Yorba, a wealthy Californio ranchero, owned Rancho Santiago de Santa Ana, which included all of modern-day Costa Mesa.

Members of the Tongva and Acjachemen nations long inhabited the area. The Tongva villages of Lupukngna, at least 3,000 years old, and the shared Tongva and Acjachemen village of Genga, at least 9,500 years old, were located in the area on the bluffs along the Santa Ana River.

After the 1769 expedition of Gaspar de Portolà, a Spanish expedition led by Junípero Serra named the area Vallejo de Santa Ana (Valley of Saint Anne). On November 1, 1776, Mission San Juan Capistrano became the area's first permanent European settlement in Alta California, New Spain.

In 1801, the Spanish Empire granted 62,500 acres (253 km^{2}) to Jose Antonio Yorba, which he named Rancho San Antonio.

After the Mexican-American War, California became part of the United States, and American settlers arrived in this area and formed the town of Fairview in the 1880s near the modern intersection of Harbor Boulevard and Adams Avenue.

To the south, meanwhile, the community of Harper had arisen on a siding of the Santa Ana and Newport Railway, named after a local rancher. This town prospered on its agricultural goods. On May 11, 1920, Harper changed its name to Costa Mesa, which means "coastal tableland" in Spanish. This is a reference to the city's geography as being a plateau by the coast. Fanny Bixby Spencer and her husband sponsored the contest which selected the city's new name.

Costa Mesa surged in population during and after World War II, as many thousands trained at Santa Ana Army Air Base and returned after the war with their families. Within three decades of incorporation, the city's population had nearly quintupled.

== Geography ==
Costa Mesa is located 37 miles (60 km) southeast of Los Angeles, and 87 miles (140 km) northwest of San Diego. Costa Mesa encompasses a total of 16 square miles (41 km^{2}) with its southernmost border only 1 mile (1.6 km) from the Pacific Ocean.

=== Climate ===
Costa Mesa has a semi-arid climate (Köppen climate classification BSh) with mild temperatures year round. Rain falls primarily in the winter months and is close to nonexistent during the summer.

Climate data for John Wayne Airport, California, 1991–2020 normals, extremes 1998–present
Month	Jan	Feb	Mar	Apr	May	Jun	Jul	Aug	Sep	Oct	Nov	Dec	Year
Record high °F (°C)	90 (32)	91 (33)	95 (35)	99 (37)	99 (37)	96 (36)	99 (37)	100 (38)	110 (43)	106 (41)	100 (38)	90 (32)	110 (43)
Mean maximum °F (°C)	83.1 (28.4)	81.5 (27.5)	83.2 (28.4)	87.3 (30.7)	85.6 (29.8)	85.0 (29.4)	89.0 (31.7)	90.5 (32.5)	97.0 (36.1)	93.8 (34.3)	88.6 (31.4)	79.7 (26.5)	99.6 (37.6)
Mean daily maximum °F (°C)	67.0 (19.4)	66.7 (19.3)	67.7 (19.8)	70.2 (21.2)	71.3 (21.8)	74.1 (23.4)	78.9 (26.1)	80.4 (26.9)	79.9 (26.6)	76.5 (24.7)	71.9 (22.2)	66.5 (19.2)	72.6 (22.6)
Daily mean °F (°C)	57.8 (14.3)	58.4 (14.7)	60.0 (15.6)	62.6 (17.0)	65.3 (18.5)	68.3 (20.2)	72.5 (22.5)	73.8 (23.2)	72.5 (22.5)	67.8 (19.9)	62.6 (17.0)	57.4 (14.1)	64.9 (18.3)
Mean daily minimum °F (°C)	48.6 (9.2)	50.1 (10.1)	52.3 (11.3)	54.9 (12.7)	59.3 (15.2)	62.6 (17.0)	66.2 (19.0)	67.1 (19.5)	65.0 (18.3)	59.2 (15.1)	53.3 (11.8)	48.3 (9.1)	57.2 (14.0)
Mean minimum °F (°C)	39.8 (4.3)	40.7 (4.8)	44.8 (7.1)	48.8 (9.3)	53.5 (11.9)	58.3 (14.6)	61.8 (16.6)	62.7 (17.1)	59.7 (15.4)	53.3 (11.8)	44.8 (7.1)	39.2 (4.0)	37.7 (3.2)
Record low °F (°C)	33 (1)	36 (2)	41 (5)	41 (5)	49 (9)	54 (12)	57 (14)	58 (14)	56 (13)	46 (8)	37 (3)	36 (2)	33 (1)
Average precipitation inches (mm)	2.59 (66)	2.64 (67)	1.62 (41)	0.52 (13)	0.27 (6.9)	0.01 (0.25)	0.04 (1.0)	0.01 (0.25)	0.10 (2.5)	0.54 (14)	0.80 (20)	2.04 (52)	11.18 (284)
Average precipitation days	5.6	7.4	5.7	3.7	1.9	0.7	0.7	0.1	0.6	3.3	4.7	6.9	41.3
Source: NOAA

== Demographics ==
Historical population
Census	Pop.	Note	%±
1950	11,844		—
1960	37,550		217.0%
1970	72,660		93.5%
1980	82,562		13.6%
1990	96,357		16.7%
2000	108,724		12.8%
2010	109,960		1.1%
2020	111,918		1.8%
U.S. Decennial Census; 1860–1870 1880–1890; 1900 1910 1920; 1930 1940 1950; 1960 1970 1980; 1990 2000 2010; 2020

Costa Mesa was first listed as an unincorporated community in the 1950 U.S. census as part of unincorporated Newport Beach Township; and listed as a city in the 1960 U.S. census.

Costa Mesa, California – Racial and ethnic composition Note: the US Census treats Hispanic/Latino as an ethnic category. This table excludes Latinos from the racial categories and assigns them to a separate category. Hispanics/Latinos may be of any race.
Race / Ethnicity (NH = Non-Hispanic)	Pop 1980	Pop 1990	Pop 2000	Pop 2010	Pop 2020	% 1980	% 1990	% 2000	% 2010	% 2020
White alone (NH)	68,813	69,493	61,778	56,993	54,169	83.35%	72.12%	56.82%	51.83%	48.40%
Black or African American alone (NH)	534	1,140	1,313	1,352	1,306	0.65%	1.18%	1.21%	1.23%	1.17%
Native American or Alaska Native alone (NH)	538	240	329	266	232	0.65%	0.35%	0.30%	0.24%	0.21%
Asian alone (NH)	4,162	5,998	7,421	8,483	9,455	5.04%	6.22%	6.83%	7.71%	8.45%
Native Hawaiian or Pacific Islander alone (NH)	4,162	5,998	601	486	412	5.04%	6.22%	0.55%	0.44%	0.37%
Other race alone (NH)	166	67	220	243	618	0.20%	0.07%	0.20%	0.22%	0.55%
Mixed race or Multiracial (NH)	x	x	2,539	2,734	4,931	x	x	2.34%	2.49%	4.41%
Hispanic or Latino (any race)	8,349	19,319	34,523	39,403	40,795	10.11%	20.05%	31.75%	35.83%	36.45%
Total	82,562	96,357	108,724	109,960	111,918	100.00%	100.00%	100.00%	100.00%	100.00%

=== 2020 ===
The 2020 United States census reported that Costa Mesa had a population of 111,918. The population density was 7,080.7 inhabitants per square mile (2,733.9/km^{2}). The racial makeup of Costa Mesa was 54.1% White, 1.3% African American, 1.3% Native American, 8.7% Asian, 0.4% Pacific Islander, 19.1% from other races, and 15.1% from two or more races. Hispanic or Latino of any race were 36.5% of the population.

The census reported that 98.3% of the population lived in households, 1.3% lived in non-institutionalized group quarters, and 0.4% were institutionalized.

There were 42,179 households, out of which 28.2% included children under the age of 18, 41.2% were married-couple households, 9.5% were cohabiting couple households, 27.0% had a female householder with no partner present, and 22.3% had a male householder with no partner present. 26.5% of households were one person, and 8.4% were one person aged 65 or older. The average household size was 2.61. There were 25,143 families (59.6% of all households).

The age distribution was 19.2% under the age of 18, 9.2% aged 18 to 24, 35.0% aged 25 to 44, 24.0% aged 45 to 64, and 12.6% who were 65 years of age or older. The median age was 35.9 years. For every 100 females, there were 101.2 males.

There were 44,047 housing units at an average density of 2,786.7 units per square mile (1,076.0 units/km^{2}), of which 42,179 (95.8%) were occupied. Of these, 38.9% were owner-occupied, and 61.1% were occupied by renters.

In 2023, the US Census Bureau estimated that the median household income was $110,073, and the per capita income was $56,625. About 5.2% of families and 8.9% of the population were below the poverty line.

=== 2010 ===
At the 2010 census Costa Mesa had a population of 109,960. The population density was 7,004.0 inhabitants per square mile (2,704.3/km^{2}). The racial makeup of Costa Mesa was 75,335 (68.5%) White (51.8% Non-Hispanic White), 1,640 (1.5%) African American, 686 (0.6%) Native American, 8,654 (7.9%) Asian, 527 (0.5%) Pacific Islander, 17,992 (16.4%) from other races, and 5,126 (4.7%) from two or more races. Hispanic or Latino of any race were 39,403 persons (35.8%).

The Census reported that 106,990 people (97.3% of the population) lived in households, 2,232 (2.0%) lived in non-institutionalized group quarters, and 738 (0.7%) were institutionalized.

There were 39,946 households, 12,298 (30.8%) had children under the age of 18 living in them, 16,478 (41.3%) were opposite-sex married couples living together, 4,369 (10.9%) had a female householder with no husband present, 2,392 (6.0%) had a male householder with no wife present. There were 3,013 (7.5%) unmarried opposite-sex partnerships, and 281 (0.7%) same-sex married couples or partnerships. 10,963 households (27.4%) were one person and 2,775 (6.9%) had someone living alone who was 65 or older. The average household size was 2.68. There were 23,239 families (58.2% of households); the average family size was 3.30.

The age distribution was 23,682 people (21.5%) under the age of 18, 12,847 people (11.7%) aged 18 to 24, 38,211 people (34.7%) aged 25 to 44, 25,106 people (22.8%) aged 45 to 64, and 10,114 people (9.2%) who were 65 or older. The median age was 33.6 years. For every 100 females, there were 103.7 males. For every 100 females age 18 and over, there were 102.7 males.

There were 42,120 housing units at an average density of 2,682.9 per square mile, of the occupied units 15,799 (39.6%) were owner-occupied and 24,147 (60.4%) were rented. The homeowner vacancy rate was 1.2%; the rental vacancy rate was 5.9%. 42,517 people (38.7% of the population) lived in owner-occupied housing units and 64,473 people (58.6%) lived in rental housing units.

During 2009–2013, Costa Mesa had a median household income of $65,830, with 15.1% of the population living below the poverty line.

=== Housing ===
Measure Y is a ballot initiative approved by voters in 2016. It requires public approval of projects that have a general plan amendment or zoning change and would add 40 or more dwelling units or 10,000 or more square feet of commercial space. The median housing price is $807,000 ($505 per sq ft) and $3,500 for the median rent per month. Measure Y was amended in 2022 by Measure K.

== Economy ==
The city's economy relies heavily on retail and services. The largest center of commercial activity is South Coast Plaza, a shopping center noted for its architecture and size. The volume of sales generated by South Coast Plaza, on the strength of its more than 270 stores, places it among the highest volume regional shopping centers in the nation. It generates more than $1 billion per year in revenue. South Coast Metro is a commercial, cultural, and residential district surrounding South Coast Plaza in northern Costa Mesa and southern Santa Ana, itself part of the South Coast Plaza–John Wayne Airport edge city.

Some manufacturing activity also takes place in the city, mostly in the industrial, southwestern quarter, which is home to a number of electronics, pharmaceuticals and plastics firms. Business services company Experian has its North American headquarters in Costa Mesa.

Anduril Industries, Ceradyne, El Pollo Loco, Emulex, Hurley, RVCA, Toyota Racing Development, Vans, and Volcom are among the businesses headquartered in Costa Mesa. A local newspaper, the Daily Pilot, is published by the Los Angeles Times.

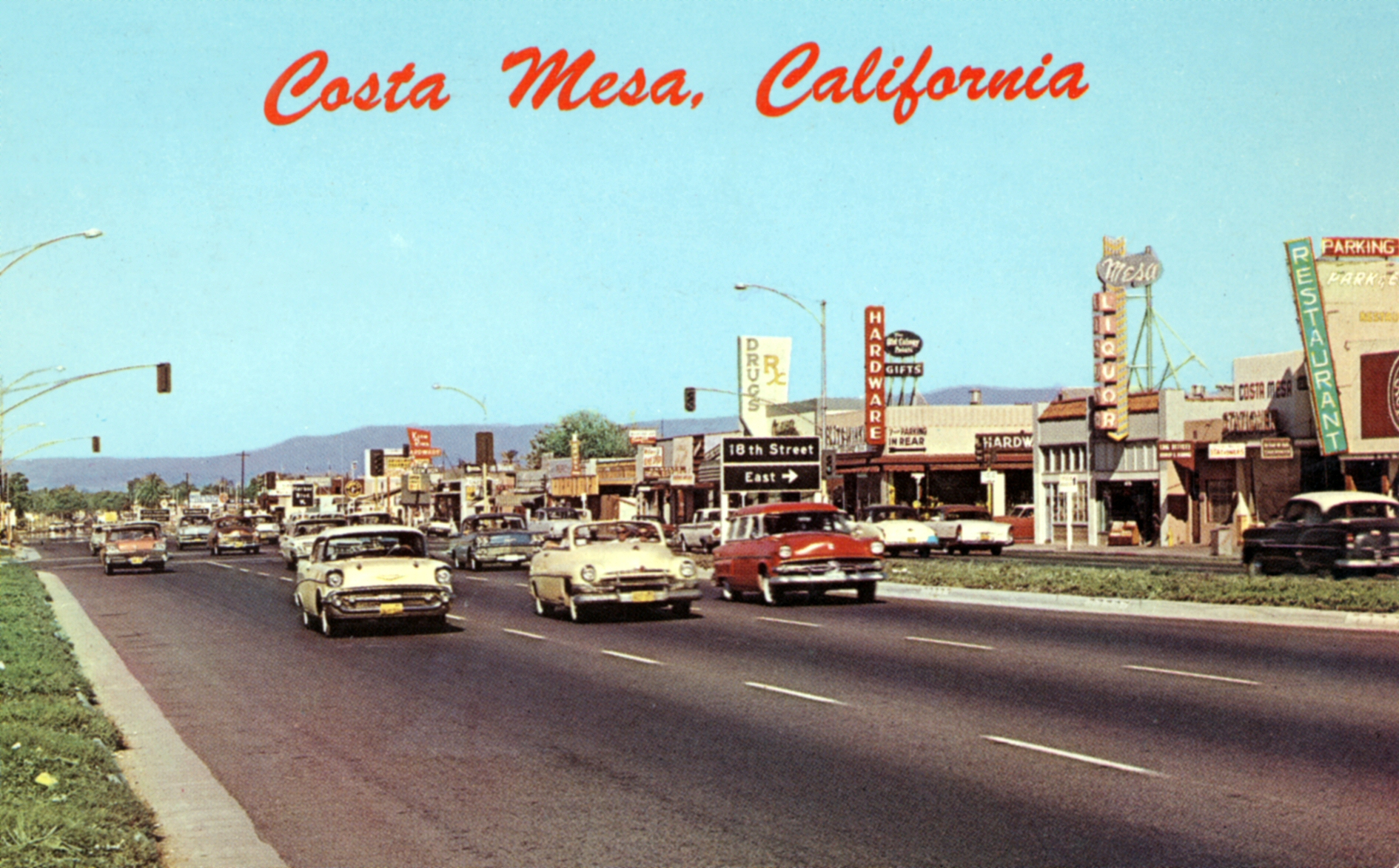
Newport Boulevard, 1950s

The Trinity Broadcasting Network was headquartered in Costa Mesa (and had its main production studio there) until it relocated most of its operations. In addition, the Calvary Chapel denomination, along with its "mother church" Calvary Chapel Costa Mesa, is located in the city.

Wahoo's Fish Taco was founded in Costa Mesa in 1988 by Chinese-Brazilian brothers Eduardo "Ed" Lee, Renato "Mingo" Lee and Wing Lam.

Costa Mesa offers 26 parks, a municipal golf course, 26 public schools and two libraries.

=== Top employers ===
According to the city's Annual Comprehensive Financial Report for the fiscal year ended June 30, 2025, the top employers in the city are:

#	Employer	# of employees
1	Experian Information Solutions	3,700
2	Coast Community College District	2,900
3	Anduril Industries	2,500
4	Orange Coast College	1,900
5	California State Hospital-Fairview Dev. Ctr.	1,215
6	Automobile Club Enterprises	1,200
7	Nationsbenefit LLC	740
8	Monroe Operations LLC	681
9	IBM	675
10	Deloitte & Touche LLP	630

== Arts and culture ==
=== Annual cultural events ===
The Orange County Fair takes place at the fairgrounds in Costa Mesa each July. The Fair receives more than one million visitors each year.

The Annual Scarecrow & Pumpkin Festival was first held in 1938, went on hiatus for seven decades, and then was restarted in 2013.

=== Facilities ===
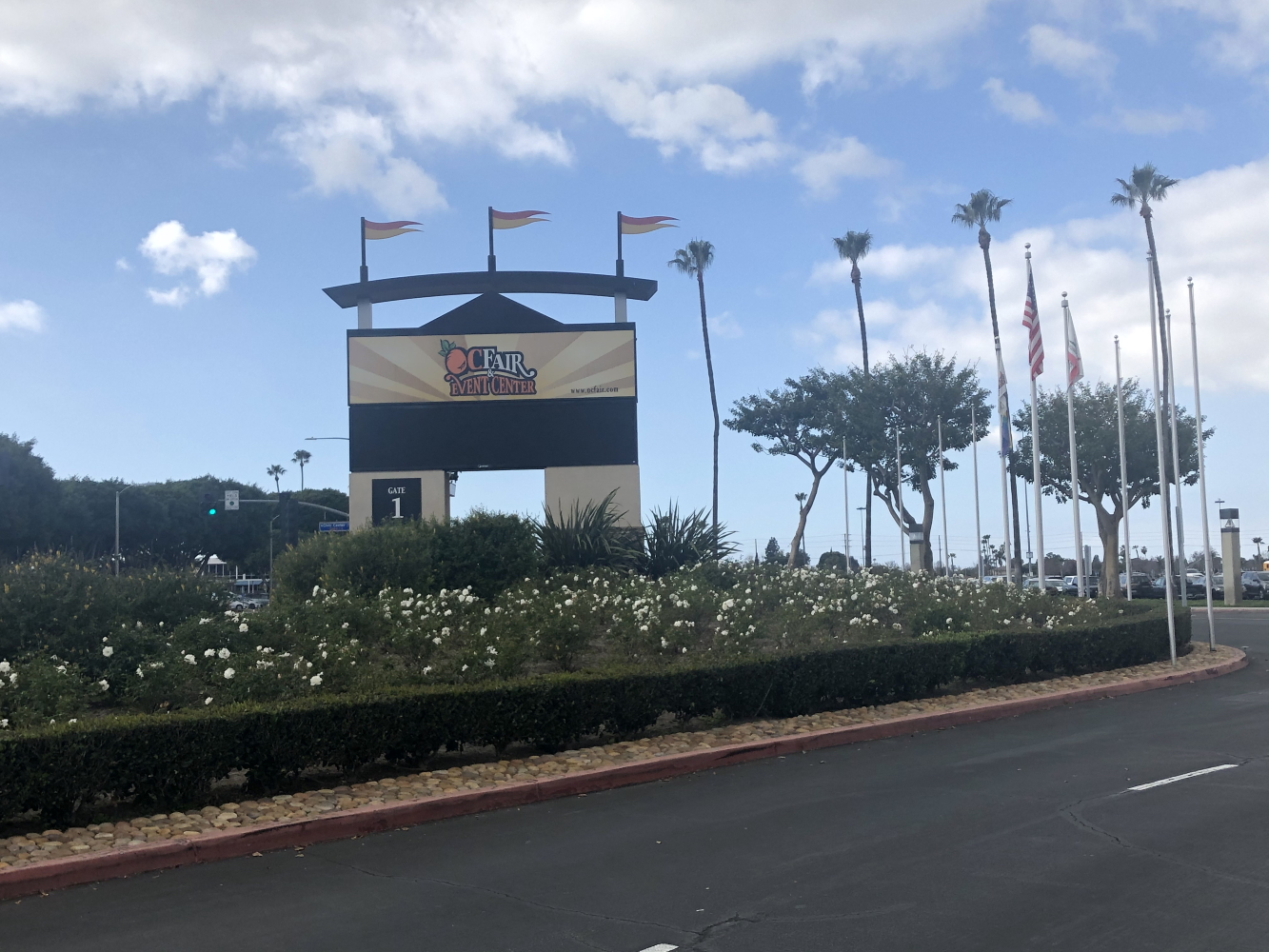
Fairgrounds, Costa Mesa, in 2020

Adjacent to the Fairgrounds is the Pacific Amphitheatre, which has hosted acts such as Madonna, Jessica Simpson, Steppenwolf, and Kelly Clarkson.

The Segerstrom Center for the Arts and South Coast Repertory Theater are based in the city.

=== National Football League ===
Costa Mesa has been home to the NFL's Las Vegas Raiders training camp since 2024. Previously it was home to the training center, training camp and corporate headquarters of the Los Angeles Chargers from 2017 to 2024. The team agreed to a lease of the facility they moved into prior to their relocation from San Diego.

The building, called the Jack Hammett Sports Complex is a former office space, but Chargers players and coaches said it was an upgrade from what the team had in San Diego. The Chargers occupied the facility until 2024 when they left for a purpose-built practice facility in El Segundo. The team gutted the first floor of the building to make room for team rooms. Construction cost more than $3.8 million. After the Chargers departed for El Segundo, the facility became the training camp home of the Las Vegas Raiders.

Decades prior, the facility was a lima bean farm owned by a Swedish immigrant family who became prominent developers in Orange County.

== Government ==
=== Local ===
A general law city, Costa Mesa has a council-manager form of government. In November 2016, voters approved changing the City Council seats from five at-large seats to six voting districts and a directly elected mayor, who acts as the chairperson for the council and head of the government. The mayor serves two-year terms and councilmembers serve four year terms, with each office having a two-term limit. Municipal elections are held every two years, during which the mayor and three councilmembers are up for election.

Day to day, the city is run by a professional city manager and staff of approximately 460 full-time employees. Residents of the city are also serviced by various special districts, including the Mesa Water District, the Orange County Water District, the Municipal Water District of Orange County, the Irvine Ranch Water District, and the Costa Mesa Sanitary District.

=== State and federal ===
In the California State Legislature, Costa Mesa is in the 37th senatorial district, represented by Republican Steven Choi, and in the 73rd Assembly district, represented by Democrat Cottie Petrie-Norris.

In the United States House of Representatives, Costa Mesa is in California's 47th congressional district, represented by Democrat Dave Min.

Costa Mesa city vote by party in presidential elections
Year	Democratic	Republican	Third Parties
2024	50.98% 24,814	45.76% 22,273	3.26% 1,585
2020	56.00% 29,804	41.44% 22,056	2.55% 1,358
2016	50.95% 21,528	40.75% 17,219	8.30% 3,507
2012	47.66% 18,414	48.60% 18,778	3.74% 1,443
2008	51.88% 20,542	45.32% 17,945	2.80% 1,107
2004	42.91% 16,442	55.55% 21,284	1.54% 590
2000	40.06% 13,733	54.13% 18,556	5.81% 1,990
1996	36.97% 11,949	50.16% 16,213	12.87% 4,161
1992	32.46% 12,702	40.02% 15,659	27.52% 10,769
1988	33.90% 11,849	64.47% 22,534	1.63% 571
1984	26.16% 8,908	72.39% 24,652	1.45% 493
1980	24.67% 7,796	63.38% 20,028	11.95% 3,775
1976	35.51% 9,805	62.16% 17,161	2.33% 643

=== Politics ===
According to the California Secretary of State, as of February 20, 2024, Costa Mesa has 60,789 registered voters. Of those, 22,661 (37.3%) are registered Democrats, 19,888 (32.7%) are registered Republicans, 15,204 (25%) have declined to state a political party/are independents, 2,717 (4.5%) are registered American Independents, and 319 (0.5%) are registered to the Green Party.

Until 2008, Costa Mesa was a Republican stronghold in presidential elections. Since 2008, Costa Mesa has mostly voted Democratic in presidential elections, owing to the GOP's shift towards cultural conservatism. In 2008, Barack Obama was the first Democrat to carry Costa Mesa in decades, while Republican nominee Mitt Romney carried the city by only 364 votes in the 2012 presidential election. Costa Mesa flipped back to Democratic in 2016, voting for Hillary Clinton by a 10.2% margin, and for Joe Biden by a 14.6% margin in 2020.

In 2008, Costa Mesa was one of four cities in Orange County to vote against Proposition 8 (along with Aliso Viejo, Irvine, and Laguna Beach), a statewide ballot measure that banned same-sex marriages.

== Education ==
Institutions of higher learning located in Costa Mesa include Orange Coast College, Vanguard University (affiliated with the Assemblies of God), and Sofia University. Whittier Law School was a former school.

Costa Mesa has two public high schools, Costa Mesa High School and Estancia High School. There are also two public middle schools; TeWinkle Middle School, which was named after Costa Mesa's first mayor, and Costa Mesa Middle School which shares the same campus as Costa Mesa High School. Costa Mesa also has two alternative high schools that share the same campus, Back Bay High School and Monte Vista High School and another, Coastline Early College High School which is on its own facility. These are located in the Newport-Mesa Unified School District.

== Transportation ==
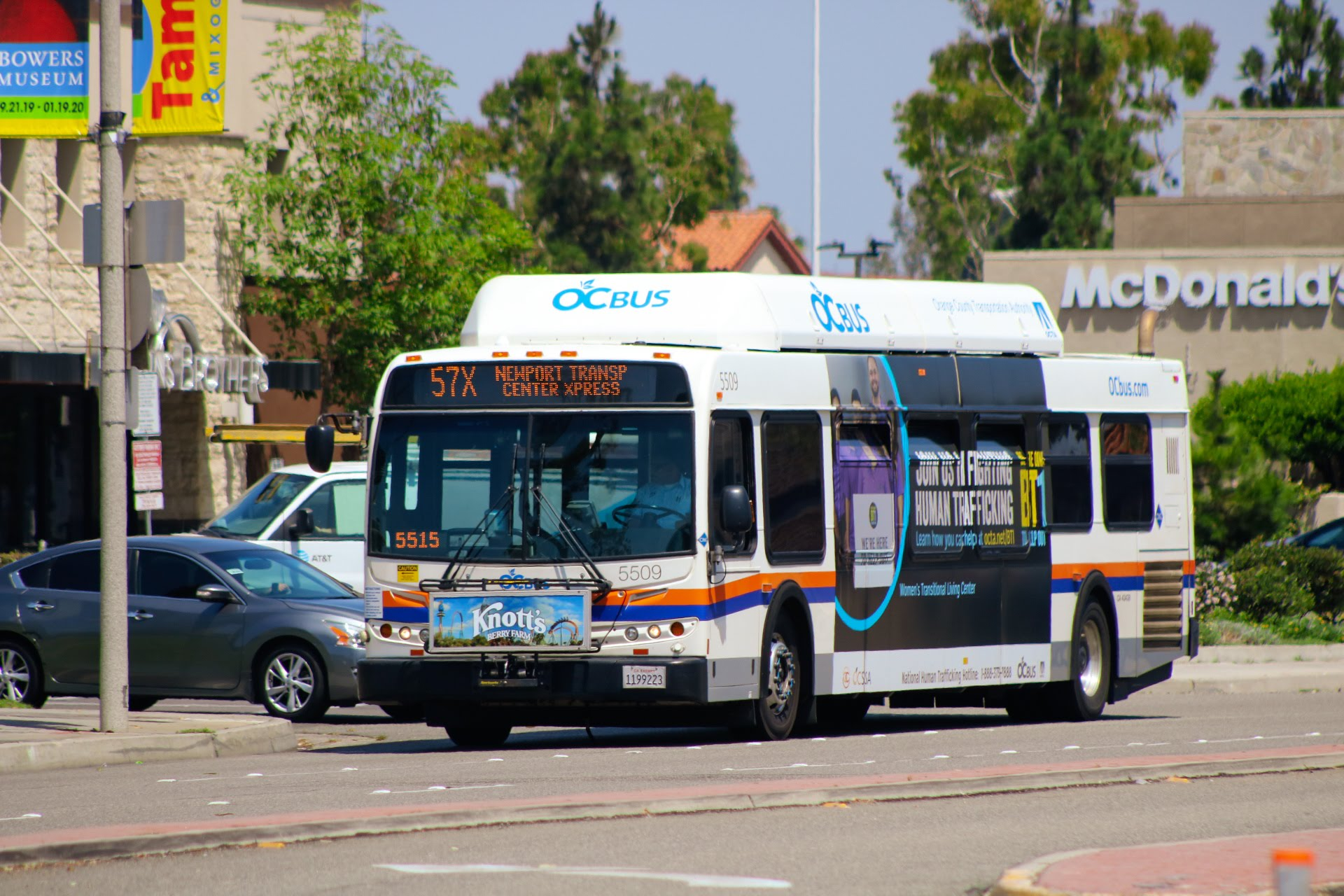
OC Bus in Costa Mesa

Costa Mesa is served by several bus lines of the Orange County Transportation Authority (OCTA), but most transportation is by automobile. Two state highways, State Route 55 (Costa Mesa Freeway) and State Route 73 (Corona del Mar Freeway), have their respective southern and northern terminus points within Costa Mesa. The San Diego Freeway (Interstate 405) also runs through the city.

== Infrastructure ==
=== Civic Center ===
The 9.5 acres (3.8 hectares; 38 thousand square metres) Costa Mesa Civic Center is located at 77 Fair Drive. City hall is a five-story building where the primary administrative functions of the city are conducted. Also contained in the Civic Center complex are Council Chambers, the Police facility, Communications building and Fire Station No. 5.

=== Emergency services ===
Fire protection is provided by the Costa Mesa Fire Department. Law enforcement is the responsibility of the Costa Mesa Police Department. Emergency Medical Services are provided by the Costa Mesa Fire Department and Care Ambulance Service.

== Notable people ==
- See List of people from Costa Mesa, California

== Sister city ==
- Wyndham, Australia

== See also ==
- Los Angeles Times suburban sections
- Otherside Farms
