= Segerstrom Center for the Arts =

Performing arts complex in Costa Mesa, California

Coordinates: 33.692674°N 117.881499°W

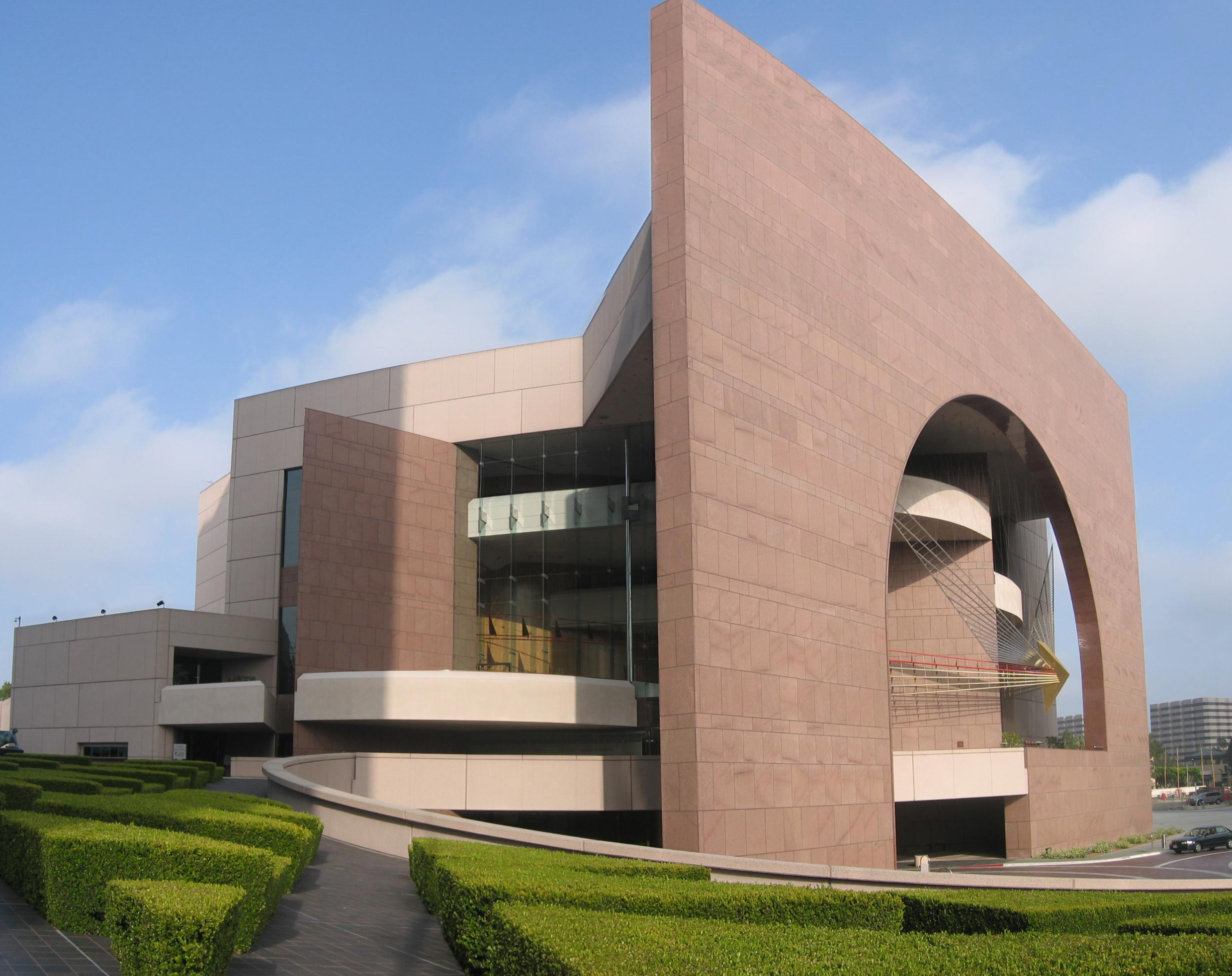
- Exterior view of Segerstrom Hall in 2007
- Interactive map of Segerstrom Center for the Arts
- Former names: Orange County Performing Arts Center (1986-2011)
- Address: 600 Town Center Dr; Costa Mesa, CA 92626-1916
- Capacity: 2,994 (Segerstrom Hall); 1,704 (Segerstrom Concert Hall); 600 (Samueli Theater); 260 (Morr Theater)
- Type: Performing arts center

Construction
- Opened: September 29, 1986
- Expanded: 2006; 2017
- Architects: Charles Lawrence; César Pelli

Tenants
- Pacific Symphony; Philharmonic Society of Orange County; Pacific Chorale

Website
- scfta.org

The Segerstrom Center for the Arts (originally called Orange County Performing Arts Center) is a performing arts complex in Costa Mesa, California, United States, which opened in 1986. Designed by Charles Lawrence, the Center's Segerstrom Hall and Judy Morr Theater were completed that same year. The Renée and Henry Segerstrom Concert Hall, Samueli Theater, and Lawrence and Kristina Dodge Education Center opened in 2006. They were the work of architect Cesar Pelli, the recipient of numerous awards and professional honors, including the American Institute of Architects Gold Medal in 1995.

The Center is the artistic home to three resident companies: the Pacific Symphony, Philharmonic Society of Orange County, and Pacific Chorale.

== Facilities ==
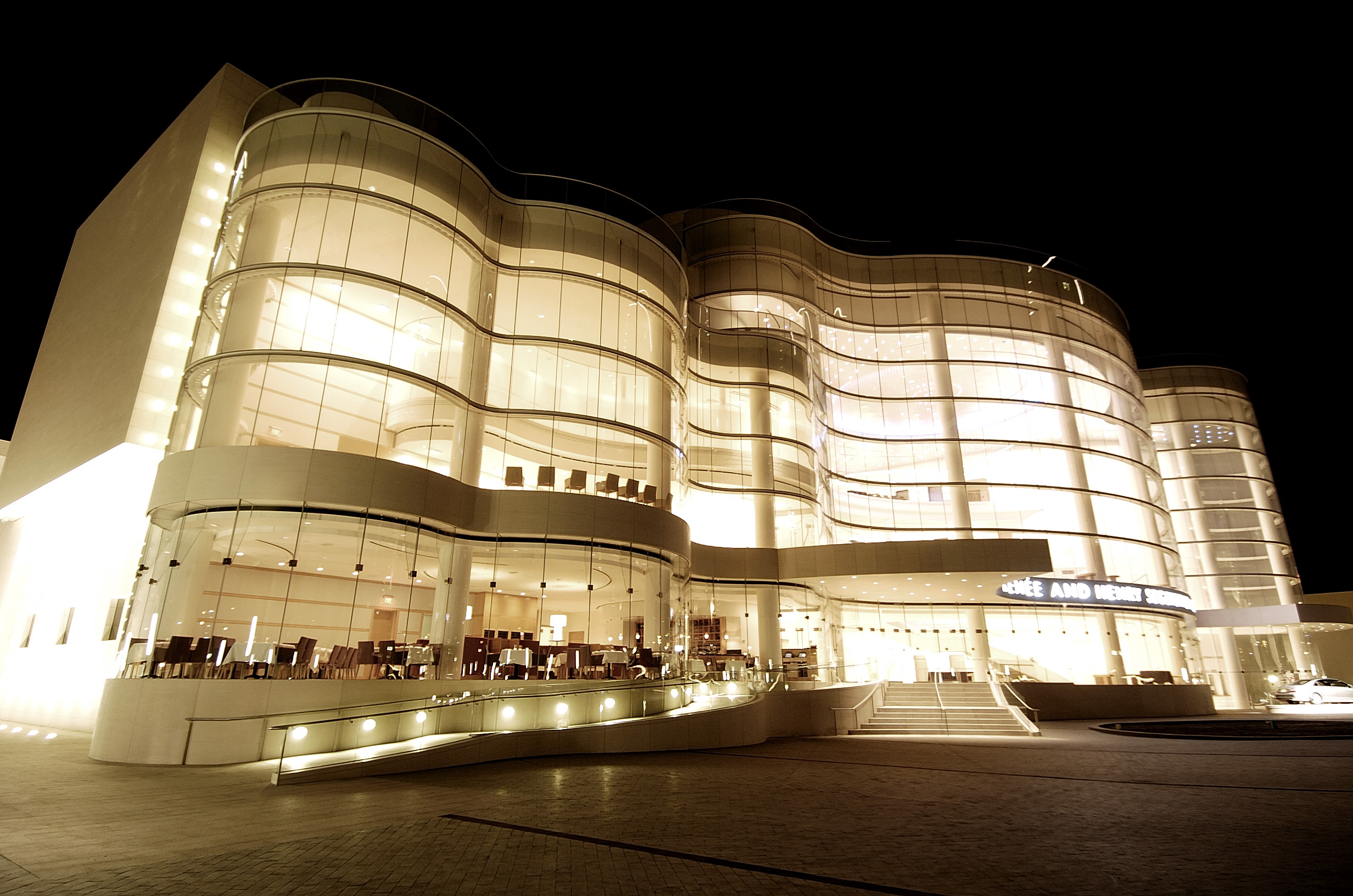
Exterior night view of the concert hall

=== Venues ===
Segerstrom Hall, a 2,994-seat, opera house-style theater, is the campus' largest facility and often the venue for Broadway musicals, ballet, and other large productions, all while being named after the Segerstrom family in its entirety. Adjacent is the Renée and Henry Segerstrom Concert Hall, a 1,704-seat theater-in-the-round and home to the William J. Gillespie Concert Organ (C.B. Fisk Opus 130), which has 4,322 pipes and 75 stops, including 57 individual voices, four manual keyboards with 61 notes each, and one pedal keyboard with 32 notes.

Housed in the same building as the Renée and Henry Segerstrom Concert Hall is the Samueli Theater, a 600-seat, multi-purpose facility. Named for Henry Samueli, who donated $10,000,000 to the Segerstrom complex. It is suitable for jazz, cabaret, theater, and special events. The Judy Morr Theater, located in the Center for Dance and Innovation, is a 250-seat hall that serves primarily as ballet-company rehearsal space and as the primary studio for the ABT Gillespie School.

In addition, the Education Center includes the Studio Performance Space and Boeing Education Lab. The Segerstrom complex is also home to the American Ballet Theatre's William J. Gillespie School, the School of Dance and Music for Children with Disabilities, Leatherby's Café Rouge, George's Café, Plaza Cafe, and two private donor rooms.

Julianne and George Argyros Plaza is a 46,000 square foot area with restaurants, a permanent stage, public seating, and picnic areas. In 2006, Henry Segerstrom commissioned Richard Serra to create a sculpture as the focal point for the newly expanded Segerstrom Center for the Arts; Serra created Connector, a 65-feet-high, 360-ton, pentagonal sculpture made of weathered steel.

=== Orange County Museum of Art ===
The Orange County Museum of Art broke ground on a new primary facility at the Segerstrom Center for the Arts campus on September 20, 2019. The 53,000 square feet (4,900 m^{2}) structure was designed by Morphosis Architects and was topped off on October 6, 2020, with a virtual ceremony held.

The new museum opened on October 8, 2022.

=== South Coast Repertory ===
The Tony Award-winning South Coast Repertory is also located on the Segerstrom Center for the Arts campus.

== See also ==
- List of concert halls
