= Orange County, California Superior Court =

California superior court with jurisdiction over Orange County

Superior Court of California, County of Orange
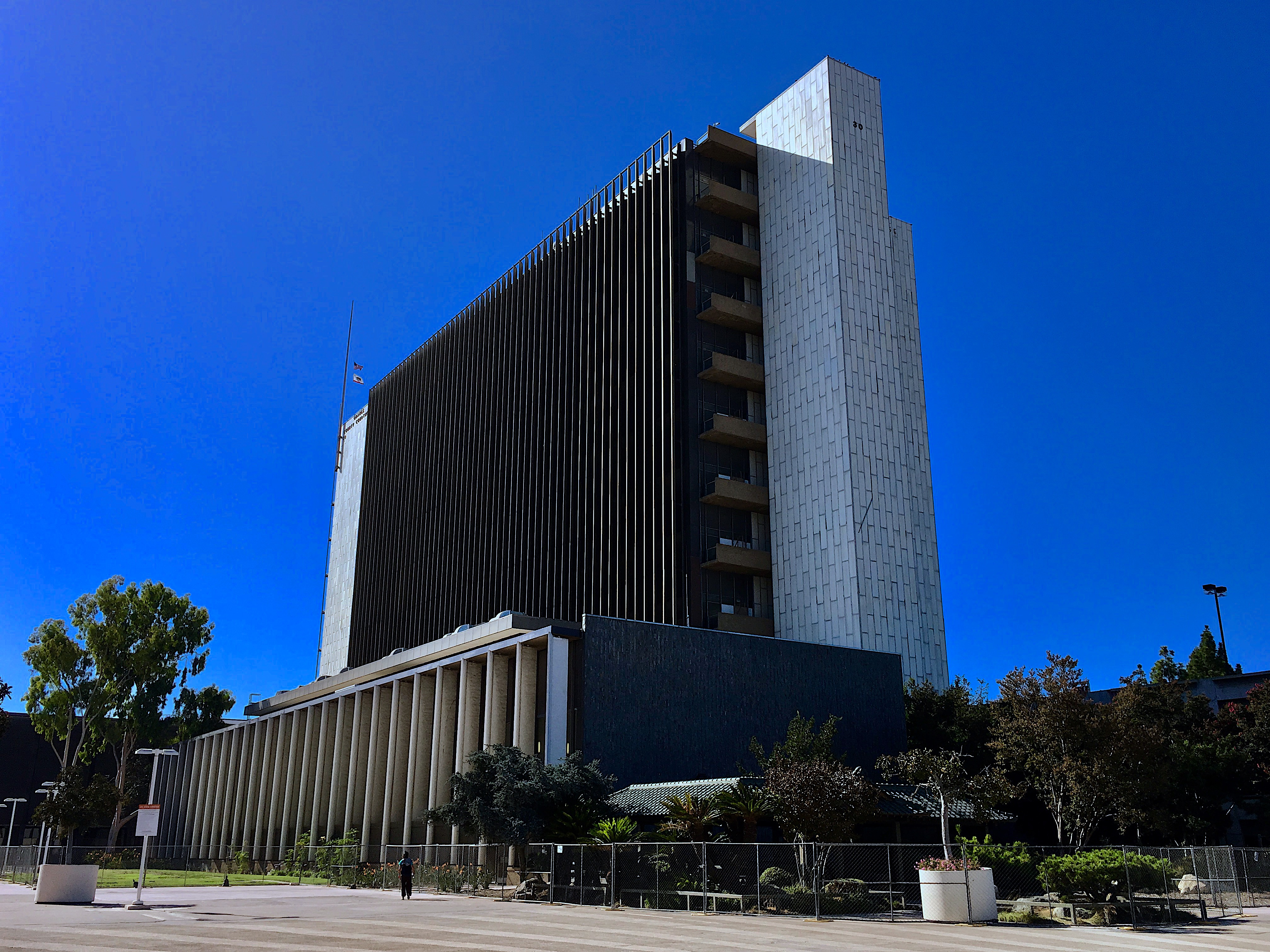
- 1968 Orange County Courthouse (2019)
- Interactive map of Superior Court of California, County of Orange
- 33.75065°N 117.87534°W
- Established: 1893
- Jurisdiction: Orange County, California
- Location: Santa Ana (county seat); Orange (Lamoreaux); Newport Beach (Harbor); Fullerton (North); Westminster (West)
- Coordinates: 33.75065°N 117.87534°W
- Appeals to: California Court of Appeal for the Fourth District, Division Three
- Website: occourts.org

Presiding Judge
- Currently: Hon. Craig E. Arthur

Assistant Presiding Judge
- Currently: Hon. Sheila F. Hanson

Court Executive Officer
- Currently: David Yamasaki

The Superior Court of California, County of Orange, also known as the Orange County Superior Court, is the California superior court with jurisdiction over Orange County.

== History ==
Orange County was partitioned from Los Angeles County in 1889. An earlier attempt to partition what would have been Anaheim County (with its county seat at Anaheim) had failed in the State Senate after passing the Assembly in 1870. The name "Orange County" was coined in 1872, and additional attempts to partition the new county failed in 1876 (as "Santa Ana County") and 1881 (as "Orange County"); each of these early attempts fixed the northern border at the San Gabriel River, leaving Anaheim as a logical county seat, as it would be in the center.

The city of Santa Ana was laid out by William H. Spurgeon in December 1870 and its fortunes were boosted when the Southern Pacific Railroad arrived in 1877. The bill to create Orange County had, as a last-minute compromise, shifted the northern border to Coyote Creek instead, putting Santa Ana in the middle of the new county, which generated considerable antipathy from the citizens of Anaheim. Nevertheless, a majority of the citizens of the new Orange County first voted to divide themselves from Los Angeles County on June 4, 1889, then selected Santa Ana as the county seat (over Orange) on July 17 of the same year. The first session of court was held by Judge J.W. Towner on August 1, 1889, in the rented (and now-demolished) Congdon Building at 302 1/2 E Fourth Street. Judge Towner was succeeded by J.W. Ballard, who presided over the superior court from 1897 to 1903, and Z.B. West, who succeeded Ballard in 1903.

1901 Orange County Courthouse

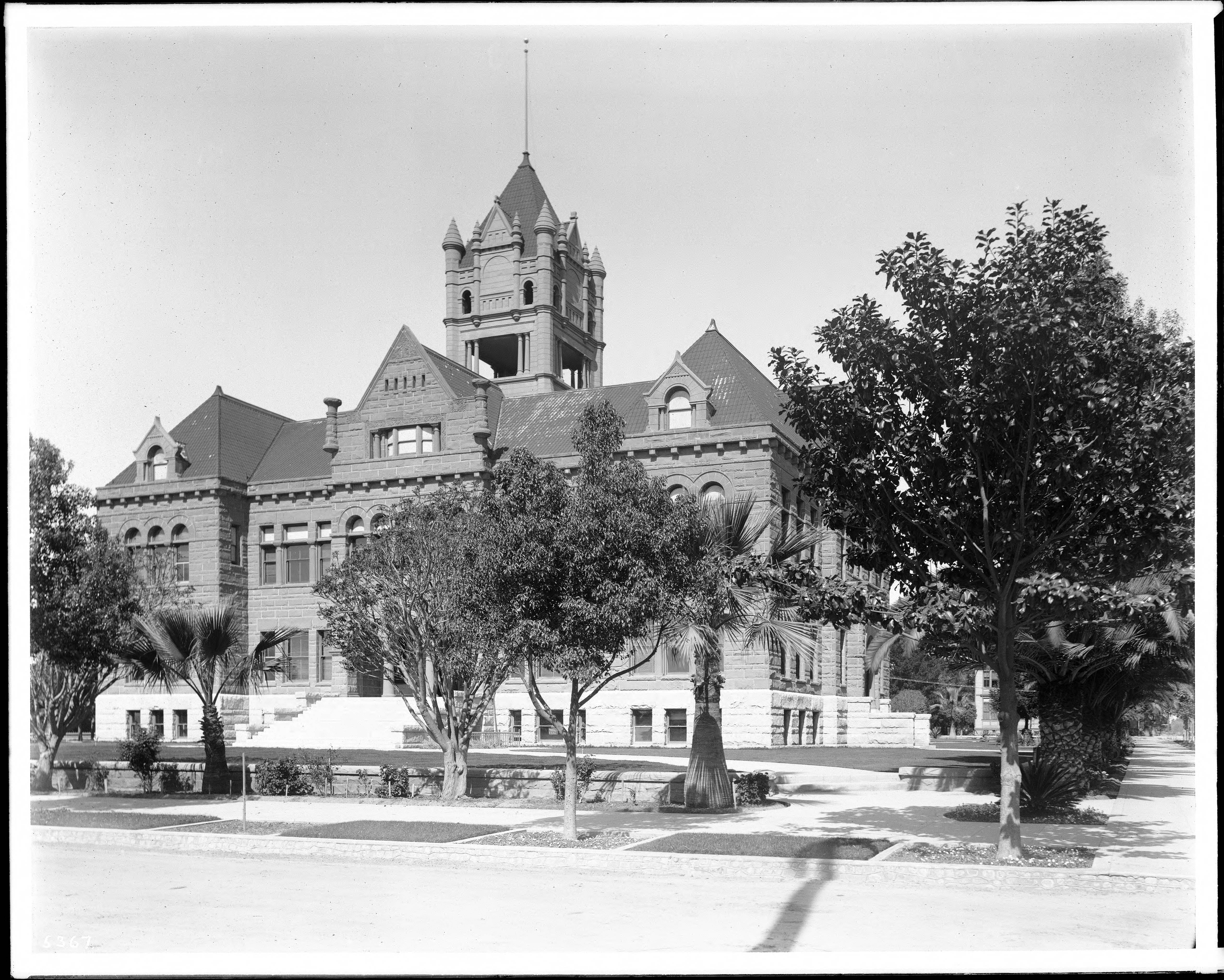
as completed (1905)

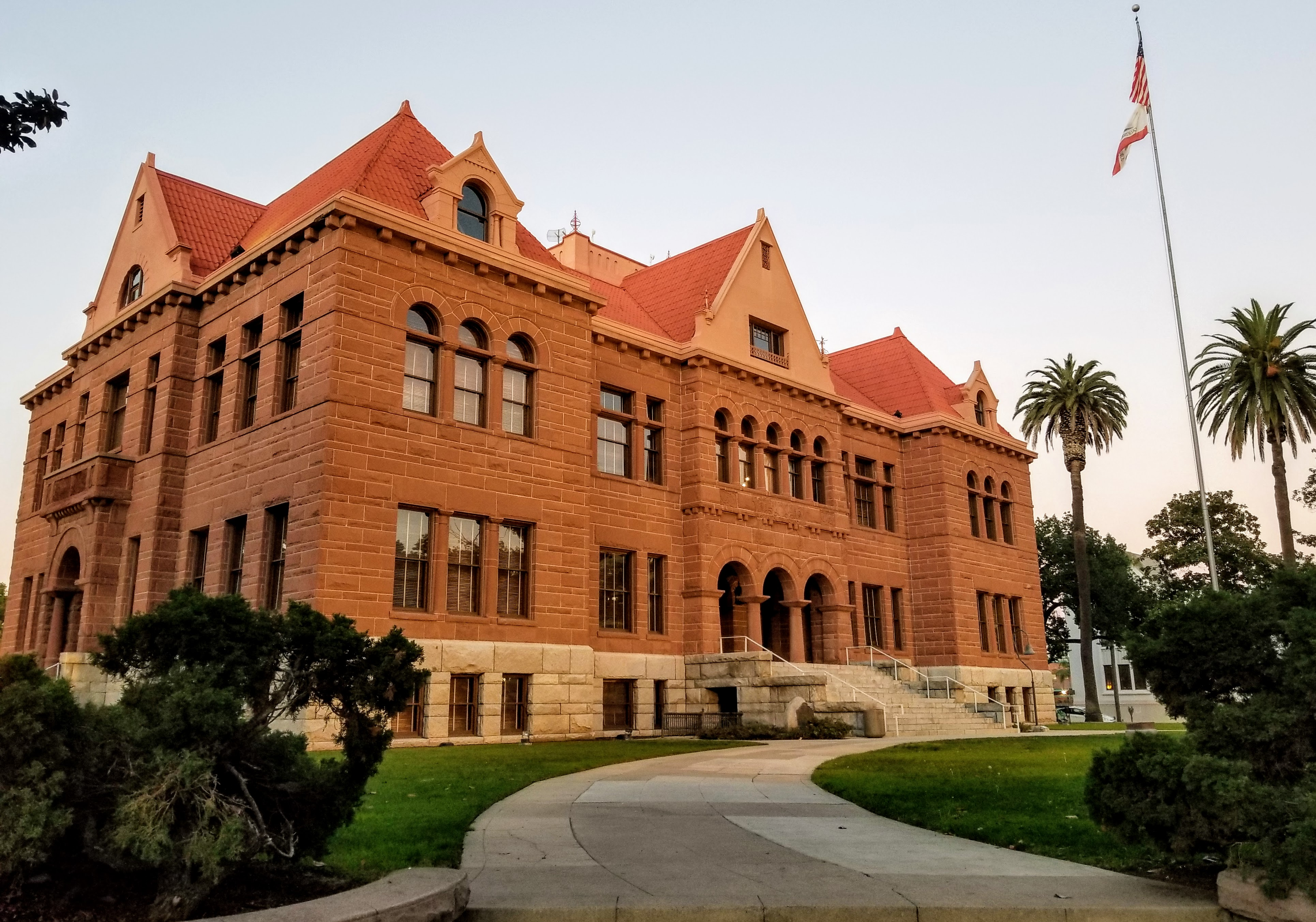
as remodeled (2019)

In June 1893, the county purchased a site for a new permanent courthouse from Spurgeon for US$8,000 (equivalent to $280,000 in 2024), in the block bounded by Sixth, Church, West, and Sycamore (now Santa Ana Blvd, Civic Center Dr, Broadway, and Sycamore, respectively); however, the first building erected on this site was the county jail, completed in 1897. In 1899, the county board of supervisors solicited plans for a new courthouse, approving a revised design by C. B. Bradshaw and John Parkinson on October 3, and submitting a bond measure to raise US$100,000 (equivalent to $3,780,000 in 2024), which the voters passed on September 5. However, Bradshaw & Parkinson withdrew after two supervisors alleged a plastering contractor said "it would be $400 in my pocket" if the Bradshaw & Parkinson plans were approved, and the supervisors instead approved a design by Charles L. Strange on December 20. The Romanesque Revival design used red sandstone facing from Arizona and granite blocks from Temecula. Blee & McNeill were selected as the constructors and the cornerstone was laid on July 4, 1900. When it was completed and accepted on September 23, 1901, it was the tallest building in the county, standing 135 ft (41 m) high at the top of the cupola with a footprint of 136 ft × 88 ft (41 m × 27 m). The courthouse was formally opened on November 12, 1901. The final cost of the 1901 courthouse was estimated to be US$117,000 (equivalent to $4,420,000 in 2024). After it was damaged in the 1933 Long Beach earthquake, the cupola was removed.

The 1901 courthouse was remodeled in 1964–65 to add four more courtrooms on the first floor and air conditioning, but the facilities remained inadequate and ground was broken on September 16, 1966 for a new 11-story courthouse, designed in part by Richard Neutra. The new courthouse was dedicated on January 10, 1969; some limited functions remained in the 1901 building until 1978. The 1969 courthouse consists of two buildings, the tower on the northeast corner and a lower three-story building to the west, joined by a glass-paneled entrance and covered walkway.

Preservation efforts for the 1901 courthouse saw it named to the list of California Historical Landmarks (No. 837) on March 11, 1970, then to the National Register of Historic Places in 1977. A seismic evaluation in 1979 concluded the building did not meet current codes, and the last county employees were moved by October 30. The building was gutted and reconstructed with steel beams from 1983 to 1985. By 1992, the interior restoration was complete.

== Venues ==
Orange County Superior Court locations:
1 700 Civic Center Dr W (Santa Ana: Central)
751 W Santa Ana Blvd (Civil Complex)
2 341 The City Dr S (Orange: Lamoreaux)
3 4601 Jamboree Rd (Newport Beach: Harbor)
4 1275 N Berkeley Ave (Fullerton: North)
5 8141 13th St (Westminster: West)

In addition to the main Central branch in Santa Ana, the Superior Court of Orange County operates from branches in Orange (Lamoreaux Justice Center), Newport Beach (Harbor Justice Center), Fullerton (North Justice Center), and Westminster (West Justice Center).

The 1901 Orange County Courthouse is being used as a museum by the Orange County Clerk-Recorder and OC Parks departments. Several motion pictures have filmed there, including Catch Me If You Can (2002) and Legally Blonde (2001).
