= Orangefair Marketplace =

Shopping center in California, US

Coordinates: 33.8578°N 117.9234°W

Orangefair Marketplace is a community shopping center in Fullerton, California which, when built, was one of the earliest large shopping centers in Orange County, California. along with Anaheim Plaza and Orange County Plaza. It is located at the southeast corner of Harbor Boulevard (originally Spadra Road) and Orangethorpe Avenue, a mile south of Fullerton's historic downtown.

== History ==
The plans for the Orangefair Center, as it was first known, shopping center were announced in 1955. It was to cost $8–10 million, be built on 32 acres (13 ha) with parking for 3000 cars. it was to include:

- a 63,000-square-foot (5,900 m^{2}) J. C. Penney department store
- a 35,000-square-foot (3,300 m^{2}) W. T. Grant variety store
- a 34,000-square-foot (3,200 m^{2}) Mayfair supermarket
- a 7,200-square-foot (670 m^{2}) Woolworth's variety store

for a total of 305,000 square feet (28,300 m^{2}) of gross leasable area.

The center opened in 1956 as did the new Houston Freeway, which together with what was then called the Santa Ana Canyon Freeway, now form the 91 (Riverside) Freeway.

In 1957 a $4,000,000, 300,000 square feet (28,000 m^{2}) extension was built which, among other new stores, included Long's Drugs and a new branch of Rankin's, a Santa Ana department store, the only one it would ever build, but only operated for part of 1959 before closing.

Orangefair was an open-air mall surrounded by parking lots, with a pedestrian mall in a T shape on the interior, which is now closed off and used for service vehicles.

In 1967, Penney's opened a totally new and much larger store, which it called the first "Total Penney's" and its first "complete department store" in Orange County. A Boston Stores junior department store opened in the space in 1968.

During an era when owners of older shopping center became concerned about upgrading their facilities in light of competition from new centers, plans in 1976-7 called for the building of a bridge over Harbor Blvd. and incorporating the site of a Montgomery Ward store (now Target) store on the west side of Harbor. These never came to fruition.

In 1993, JCPenney closed and relocated to Brea Mall, which led to the creation of a new power center of today, now anchored by Burlington, Best Buy and Marshalls. The former JCPenney building first operated as a HomeBase store before becoming Burlington afterwards. There are additional community-size open air centers across the streets immediately to the north (Fullerton Town Center, with a Costco (formerly Price Club), Ross Dress For Less (formerly Silo Electronics and later Office Depot), and Amazon Fresh (formerly Toys R Us)), east (Walmart (formerly Zody's/later Food 4 Less), and south (Lowe's and Curacao).
