= Logan Barrio, Santa Ana =

Neighborhood in California, US

Logan Barrio, Santa Ana Tongva (Gabrieleno)
- Community of Santa Ana
- Logan Barrio
- Interactive map of Logan Barrio, Santa Ana
- Coordinates: 33°45′15″N 117°51′28″W
- State: California
- County: Orange County
- City: Santa Ana, California

Logan Barrio is a neighborhood in northeast central Santa Ana in Orange County, California, United States. Also unofficially referred to as Historic Logan Barrio, it is one of three Latino barrios and is historically significant to the city's Chicano/Mexican-American community. Logan Barrio is a mixed-use area designated for industrial and residential purposes bordered by the neighborhoods of French Park to the west, Downtown Santa Ana to the southwest, and Saddleback View to the southeast. The Mabury Park neighborhood and Interstate 5 form the northeastern boundary, and the Santa Ana Regional Transportation Center is located in the southernmost boundary.

Logan Barrio (Barrio is a Spanish word for "neighborhood") is home to Chepa's Park, the "Heroes Among Us/Among Heroes" mural, and La Chiquita Restaurant and Grocery. It is one of the earliest Mexican barrios and oldest neighborhoods in Santa Ana.

== History ==
=== Before Logan Barrio ===
Following the Mexican-American War, the Treaty of Guadalupe Hidalgo was signed on February 2, 1848. California became the 31st state of the United States in 1850. In 1869, William Spurgeon purchased part of the land from Rancho Santiago de Santa Ana, which led to the founding of the City of Santa Ana. Spurgeon, along with other founders James Fruit and James McFadden, created the Western Development Company to attract the Union Pacific Railroad to Santa Ana. The first train depot was built on Fruit Street (now Santa Ana Boulevard), just one block outside what is now known as Logan Barrio. At that time, Santa Ana was still considered part of Los Angeles, and Logan Barrio was expected to be a lively commercial hub called Santa Ana East. However, because of competition from nearby areas, the commercial center remained vacant, and eventually the lots were sold for residential development.

=== Mexicans from Logan ===
It was during this time that the first Mexican family settled on Lincoln Street before others moved into the neighborhood. Soon after, Californios, members of the Acjachemen Indian Tribe (Juaneños), Mexicans from the Southwest, and newly arrived Mexicans from across the border also moved into the area. Regardless of their backgrounds, society labeled them “Mexicans from Logan.”

According to the 1901 Santa Ana City directory, there were only three residences on Lincoln Street. At that time, there were 16 residences total, and Logan Street extended beyond its current limits to the north, reaching the 600 block near Washington Street, close to where the Santa Ana Train Station now stands. In 1910, the census recorded 263 Mexican families in Orange County. In 1928, the Santa Ana Unified School District built Logan School at the corner of Stafford and Logan Streets. It was a segregated school serving only Mexican students. By 1947, Logan Barrio had 210 homes, with 84% of residents bearing Spanish surnames.

=== Religion ===
Historian Mary Garcia noted that in the early 1900s, the dominant religion in the neighborhood was Catholicism, with St. Joseph's Church being the first church Logan residents attended. She also wrote that in 1922, Logan residents and other Mexicans in the area raised funds to establish their own Hispanic parish, Our Lady of Guadalupe Church. Scholar Jonathan E. Calvillo, author of The Saints of Santa Ana: Faith and Ethnicity in a Mexican Majority City, described it in his book as: “Logan Barrio was close to St. Joseph’s, but Mexican residents desired a parish of their own, and thus founded Our Lady of Guadalupe on Third Street and Grand Ave.” The Our Lady of Guadalupe Church enabled parishioners to participate in other religious activities, including religious classes in Spanish (also called doctrina in Spanish) and "jamaicas" (fundraising festivals held by a parish, especially a Spanish-speaking Catholic parish).

=== Veterans in Logan history ===
To this day, residents of Logan Barrio honor those who served in the military and in U.S. wars. During World War I, Mr. Ernie Lara Sr. was recognized as a veteran. World War II had the most profound impact on Logan Barrio’s families, with some families sending all their men to serve. It is said that over 100 service members listed their home address as Logan Barrio during World War II. In 2012-2016, local muralist Carlos Aguilar paid tribute to Logan Barrio veterans in his mural "Heroes Among Us/Among Heroes," still located on a wall of La Chiquita Grocery, at the corner of Custer and Washington Streets.

=== La Logan ===
Before the 1950s, Logan Barrio was larger. It included an extra residential block north of Washington Street and merged into nearby orchards and farmland. In the early 1950s, construction of Interstate 5 began on the neighborhood's north side, and more land was later taken from Logan Barrio to expand the Santa Ana Train Station. The development forced some families to move out of the neighborhood.

Historian Mary Garcia (also a former resident of Logan Barrio) recorded several names of "the early pioneer families" of Logan Barrio in her book Santa Ana's Logan Barrio: Its History, Stories and Families. Some of the family names included are: Azevedo family, Acuna family, Calvillo family, Cardona family, Duron family, Gomez family, Laguna family, Luna family, Martinez Family, Martinez (Silvero) family, Mesa/Garcia family, Nieblas family, Parga family, Rodriguez family, Romero family, among others who are not noted in the book.

Over the decades, the neighborhood has faced many challenges in maintaining its land and boundaries due to development and industrial businesses in the area. As a result, residents formed the Logan Barrio neighborhood association to address issues arising from city ordinances, rezoning initiatives, and the impacts of industrialization on their lives. Many native and immigrant families have lived in Logan Barrio, using it as a connection to other neighborhoods or towns. Some have left but still maintain family ties there and continue to visit; others return for the annual Logan Barrio Reunion. Even today, people often say they are from "La Logan," a term that reflects their camaraderie and pride.

=== Logan Barrio Reunion ===
The Logan Barrio Reunion began in 1999 and was first held at Logan Park, now called Chepa's Park. The park was established in 1969 after local residents, including the late Josephine “Chepa” Andrade, opposed the city's plan to run Civic Center Drive through their neighborhood. Later, when a proposal was made to turn the neighborhood into an industrial zone, community members advocated for the development of Logan Park on city-owned land. Their efforts resulted in successful rezoning of the area for residential use, allowing families to stay in the community.

The annual reunion is always held on the last Saturday in September and is organized by the Logan Barrio Reunion Committee, composed of long-time residents. It brings together current and former residents, descendants of the original families who settled in Logan Barrio, along with invited guests, for a potluck at the park. Activities include music, raffles, and family photos on display.

On September 28, 2024, the Logan Barrio Reunion celebrated its 25th anniversary. Cecelia Andrade Rodriguez, daughter of Josephine "Chepa" Andrade, continued her mother's legacy by leading the reunion committee, with planning starting each June. The annual gathering is a local tradition that now requires securing permits from the City of Santa Ana. Additionally, Michael Andrade, grandson of Josephine "Chepa" Andrade, launched the Logan Barrio Archival Project in 2024. This archiving effort is a community-driven initiative to preserve the neighborhood’s history for future generations. As part of the 25th celebration, Lena Luna, daughter of Leo Luna of the "early pioneer families," screened her documentary film Finding Logan: Santa Ana's Original Barrio.

== Chepa's Park ==
Chepa's Park, a 0.41-acre (0.17 ha) park where the annual Logan Barrio reunion has been held since 1999, is located at 1009 N. Custer Street, closer to Stafford Street, and between Washington Avenue, along with the "Heroes Among Us/Among Heroes" mural, and La Chiquita Restaurant and Grocery.

Prior to 2007, Chepa's Park was called Logan Park, named after the neighborhood, which took its name from Logan Street. Historian Mary Garcia suggested the street was named after Congressman John A. Logan, who in 1871 wrote legislation to provide federal land grants and subsidies for a transcontinental railroad. The park was renamed to honor Josephine "Chepa" Andrade after her death, a year after she passed in 2006. Andrade, also known as "La Reina de la Logan" or "The Queen of Logan Barrio," was a community advocate dedicated to protecting the area’s residential boundaries since 1969.

Before then, Logan Barrio had lost land and homes due to the Interstate 5 expansion and the development of Santa Ana Boulevard. In 1969, when the city purchased three parcels of land in Logan Barrio with plans to route Civic Center Drive through the neighborhood, Josephine "Chepa" Andrade fought and won against further industrialization by gathering community members at City Hall to oppose the displacement of more families and the neighborhood. A few years later, when a land-use plan aimed to turn the neighborhood into an industrial park, Andrade, along with other community members, advocated for developing Logan Park on city-owned land and eventually secured residential rezoning that allowed families to stay in the neighborhood. Over the years, Andrade was also involved with the Logan Barrio neighborhood association and Logan Barrio Reunion Committee. Towards the end of her life, Andrade continued to champion improvements in Logan Barrio and was recognized for her advocacy. In honor of her legacy and 95th birthday, the city council declared December 16, 2021, as Josephine "Chepa" Andrade Day.

== Economy ==
Logan Barrio is home to La Chiquita Restaurant, one of the oldest Mexican restaurants in Santa Ana and Orange County. It began as La Chiquita Grocery (also referred to as La Chiquita Market in Google Maps) in the early 1900s alongside a tortilla factory, owned by the Loya Family (of Fred Loya Insurance Company). In 1950, Joe Salcedo opened the restaurant and eventually bought out the Loya Family. In 1994, Sammy Montoya, along with other investors, took over La Chiquita Restaurant and Grocery. Within ten years, Montoya bought out his co-investors and has owned and operated the business alone since then.

In 2012, Montoya donated the wall next to the grocery store for Carlos Aguilar’s “Heroes Among Us/Among Heroes” mural project. The owner of La Chiquita Restaurant and Grocery supplied paint and other materials over the four years it took to finish the mural. This 20-foot-by-34-foot mural honors 160 Mexican American men and women from Logan Barrio who served in World War II or the various wars the U.S. participated in after WWII.

Macera Crematory is also located in Logan Barrio. Its headquarters was established in 1993. It has been a controversial issue among residents living nearby. The crematory is just one of several industrial businesses linked to local pollution problems, including poor air quality and hazardous levels of lead in the soil. Previous industries included a battery recycling plant and aviation fuel storage tanks.

=== Former businesses ===
Historian Mary Garcia documented businesses from the "old" Logan Barrio. They include Woolen Mills, Diamond Laundry, The Perez' Inn (1030 Logan Street), The Tamalería, Valdivia's Store (1001 Logan Street), Celia's Store (930 Logan Street), Lujan's Store (924 Logan Street), and La Vecinda (apartments at 1006 Logan Street). Additionally, many Logan Barrio residents were orange pickers, walnut pickers, and worked at the walnut processing warehouse, formerly located at the corner of Fruit (now Santa Ana Boulevard) and Poinsettia Streets. Others also picked tomatoes, celery, and sugar beets from the nearby farms. Mexican laborers from the neighborhood also helped build the nearby railroad tracks.

== Governance ==
Logan Barrio is part of City Council Ward 6 and includes prominent streets such as Logan Street, Lincoln Street, Santa Ana Boulevard, Washington Street, Santiago Street, and Custer Street. In March 2024, the Santa Ana City Council unveiled ceremonial street sign toppers for Josephine “Chepa” Andrade Way and Lydia Romero-Cruz Way at Logan and Stafford streets.

Since the 1950s, various ordinances and zoning decisions have led to classifying Logan Barrio as a mixed-use area designated for both industrial and residential purposes. In 2024, the City of Santa Ana halted permits for new or expanded industrial activity in Logan Barrio. This moratorium on new, expanded, or relocated industrial uses impacts over 130 industrial businesses in and around the densely populated, predominantly Latino neighborhoods of Logan and Lacy, as well as Downtown Santa Ana.

== Transportation ==
Interstate 5 forms the northeastern boundary of Logan Barrio. The area is served by the Santa Ana Regional Transportation Center, located in the southmost boundary, and OC Streetcar, which is scheduled to start running in 2026.
