= Yost Theater =

Californian venue

Coordinates: 33.74745°N 117.86537°W

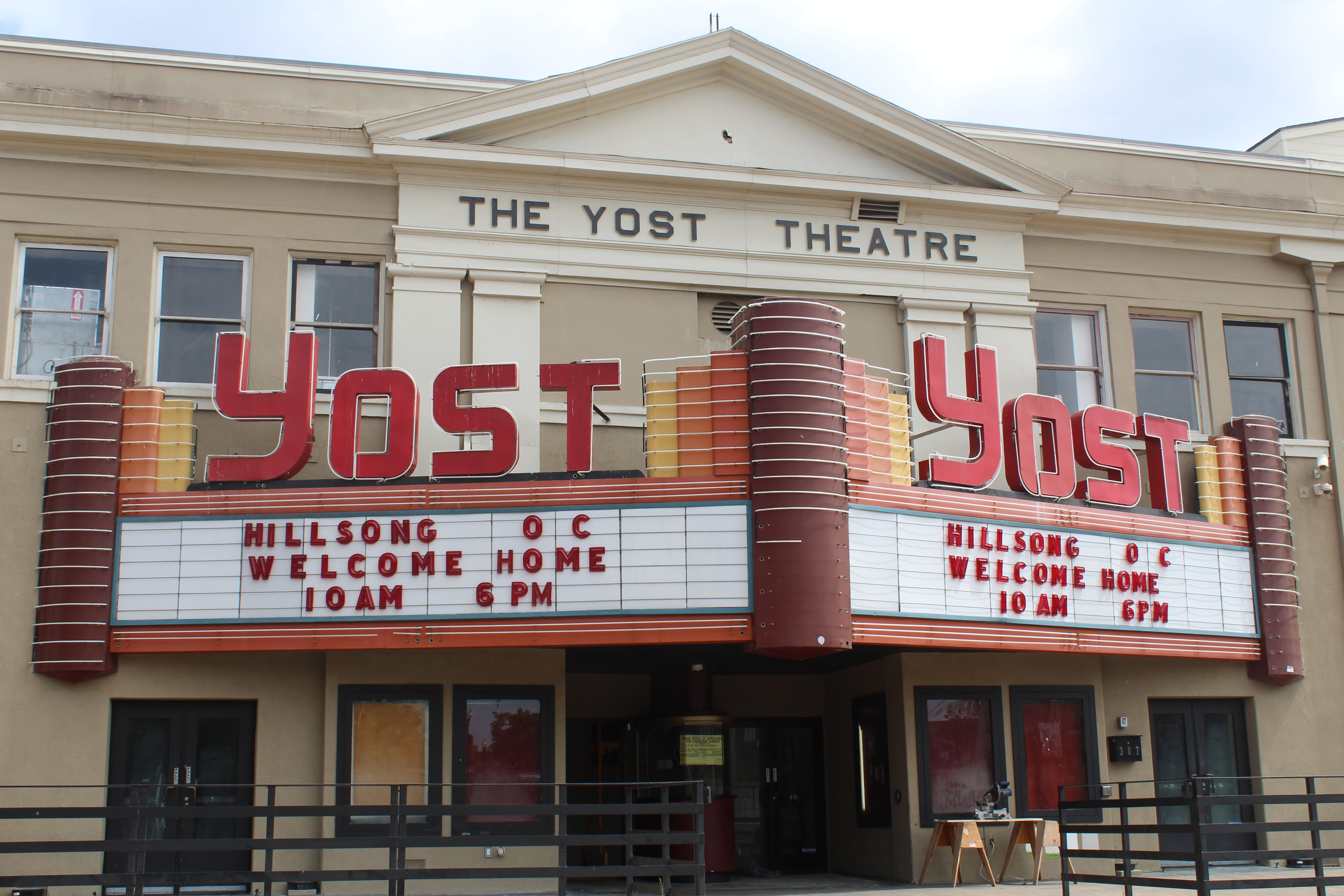
- Exterior of venue, featuring the marquee (c.2017)
- Interactive map of Yost Theater
- Former names: Auditorium Theater (1913); Clune's Santa Ana Theater (1913-19)
- Address: 307 N Spurgeon St; Santa Ana, CA 92701-4856
- Location: Lacy
- Capacity: 1,000

Construction
- Opened: June 16, 1913
- Renovated: 1919, 1921, 1935, 1947, 2007, 2013
- Architect: Frederick Eley
- General contractors: Southwest Contractor and Manufacturer

Website
- Venue Website
- Yost Theater-Ritz Hotel
- U.S. National Register of Historic Places
- NRHP reference No.: 86000107
- Added to NRHP: January 23, 1986

The Yost Theater is a concert and events venue in Santa Ana, California. It is a National Register of Historic Places-listed building located in Santa Ana's Downtown Historic District. Under the ownership of the Olivos Family it became a movie house for the Golden Age of Mexican Cinema. In recent years it housed various church organizations and underwent renovation in 2007. It is currently an event venue that hosts such functions as concerts, Ted Talks, school dances, and weddings.

== History ==
The Yost first opened as the "Auditorium Theater" in 1913. It then was renamed the "Clune's Santa Ana Theater" the same year. It was not until Ed Yost purchased the theater that it acquired the name, Yost Theater. In 1950 the theater was leased to Luis Olivos, father of Louie Olivos Jr.

The theater housed vaudeville, silent films, and talkies before it became a Mexican cinema house under the Olivos Family. Louie Olivos Jr. brought talent of Mexican cinema to the Yost including Antonio Aguilar, and Vicente Fernández to name some. He also brought Ike and Tina Turner and Sonny and Cher to the Yost.

The Chase Family, developers of the Fiesta Marketplace shopping district, purchased the Yost from the City of Santa Ana in 1986. After this purchase the theater became a church, and as a result of this, the structure suffered defacing and alteration of its interior. In 2007, the Los Angeles Times reported that the Yost Theater would be reopened for the benefit of the community at large. Restoration and conversion to a live theatre was carried out by architect Thomas Berkes, and it reopened as a concert and live performance venue that same year. Following the reopening, the Centro Cultural de México began programming concerts and related events, including an appearance of Dolores Huerta, Director of United Farm Workers, and a lecture on Frida Kahlo by Mexican art connoisseur Gregorio Luke.

On August 23, 2010, the City of Santa Ana Planning Commission voted unanimously to approve Conditional Use Permits No. 2010-04, No. 2010-05, and No. 2010-06 that allowed the venue to be operated after-hours, with a Type 47 ABC license, and as a banquet facility.

== Noted performers ==
- Javier Solis
- Alien Ant Farm
- Brandon Heath
- Children of Bodom
- Elefantes
- Ernie Ball and His Gang
- Hoodie Allen
- Ike & Tina Turner
- Jarabe de Palo
- Kate Voegele
- Molotov
- Natalie Merchant
- Puddle of Mudd
- R5
- Sense Field
- Sevendust
- Shelby Lynne
- Sonny & Cher
- Thrice
- Trisha Paytas
- Unwritten Law
- Vicente Fernández
- Wale

== Gallery ==
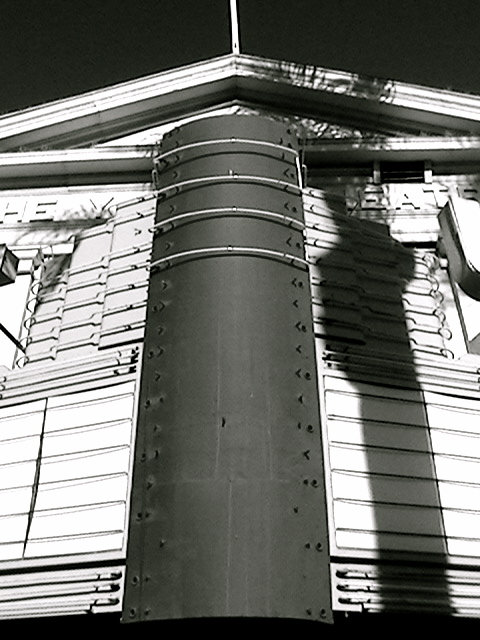
The Yost in 2007

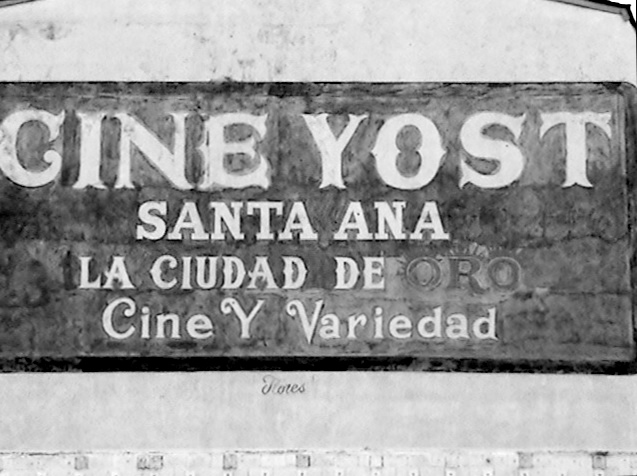
Cine Yost

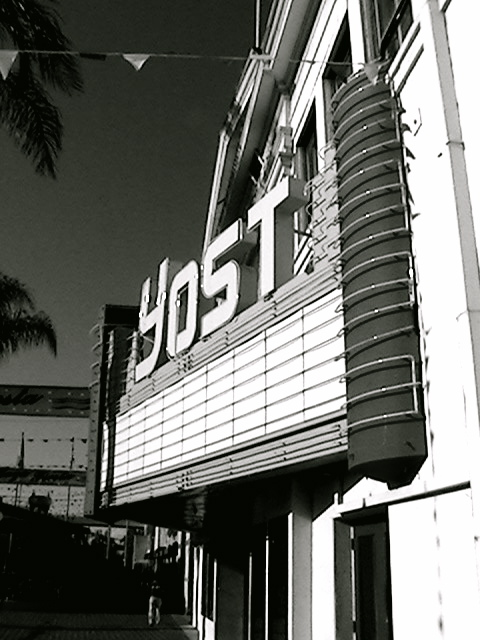
Marquee in 2007

== See also ==
- Historic Downtown Santa Ana
- Downtown Santa Ana Historic Districts
- National Register of Historic Places listings in Orange County, California
- Santa Ana, California
- El Cine Yost and the Power of Place for Mexican Migrants in Orange County, California, 1930-1990
- The Yost Theater Project
