= Louie Olivos Jr. =

American dramatist

Louie Olivos, Jr., eldest son to Don Lewis Olivos Sr. & Dona Phoebe Gamez Cisneros Olivos, is an actor, promoter, producer, director and playwright from Santa Ana, California. He studied film at Santa Ana College the University of Southern California and under Stella Adler and is a Screen Actors Guild (SAG) member. He and his family once owned the Princess, West Coast Theater, and Yost Theater in Historic Downtown Santa Ana and showcased Classical Mexican Cinema there for nearly a half of a century throughout Orange County. As an entertainment producer and promoter, he brought Antonio Aguilar, Cantinflas, Vicente Fernández, Juan Gabriel, Pedro Infante; as a rock and roll promoter he brought Sonny & Cher, Wolfman Jack and Tina Turner among many other celebrities to Santa Ana. Through his promotion company called Estrellas de Mexico, he showcased and booked Yolanda Del Rio, Yuri, Pedro Armendáriz & Los Tigres del Norte. In 1971, he founded Teatro Los Actores de Santa Ana and has been active with his troupe around Los Angeles theater houses, including the Ricardo Montalbán Theater and Stella Adler Theater in Hollywood; this troupe is the oldest Latino actor's group in Orange County.

== Contributions to Latino Cinema ==
Since 1939, the Olivos family were pioneers in the exhibition of Latino films, an enterprise taking them to Spain and Mexico, where they collaborated with the actors, directors and producers of the Golden Age of Mexican Cinema. Through the family business, Olivos was able to attend key film festivals, like the Cannes Film Festival and the Show West Convention in Las Vegas, where he facilitated the distribution of Latino classics into new markets, including non-Latino ones.

Louie Olivos, Jr. is an Original Member of Nosotros, Ricardo Montalbán's prestigious group since the 1970s.

== Awards and honors ==
- January 3 is Louie Olivos, Jr. Day in the City of Santa Ana, as granted by Mayor Miguel A. Pulido, when Louie won the Mayor's Exceptional Citizen Award in 1998.
- In 1999, Olivos was selected to teach children's theater by the city of Santa Ana in its Empowerment Zone.
- In 2004, Olivos was honored with a Lifetime Achievement Award by the Nosotros American Latino Film Festival for best Comedy short El del los Guantes, and full featured film Robbing Peter .
- In 2005, Olivos was nominated for Best Debut Performance for The 20th IFP Independent Spirit Awards for his film Robbing Peter.
- In 2006, Olivos was inducted into the Santa Ana College Hall of Fame and had a chair in the Theater Department dedicated to him.
- In 2006 Olivos was invited to take part in Mexico's 75 Years of Motion Pictures in Mexico City, Mexico.
- Since 2006, Olivos has been invited to portray Benito Juarez in the famous Fiestas Patrias Parade on September 16 in downtown Santa Ana.
- In 2007, Olivos was selected as one of Orange County's 100 Influential Latinos.
- In 2010, Olivos was awarded for being selected in the short "The Colonel" in the San Diego Film Festival.

== Academic affiliations ==
- Mentor, Puente Program, Santa Ana High School and Cypress College
- University of Southern California
- Stella Adler Studio
- Santa Ana College

== Family life ==
Olivos has been married to Macaria Calderon Olivos, a New Mexican actress, for over 50 years, and has had four children, Gay Denise Olivos-Lincoln, Christina Kay Olivos, Lewis Raphael Olivos III. (BJ) and Roman Olivos. He is a third generation Mexican American.

== Trips down La Alfombra Roja ==
- El de los Guantes, Independent Spirit Awards, 2004
- Robbing Peter, Independent Spirit Awards, 2005
- Afterglow, Tribeca Film Festival, 2006

== Stageplays ==
Olivos has written over 20 bilingual plays, including:

- El Pachuco 1943
- Los tres Grandes y María Félix (debuted on historic Olvera Street, Los Angeles)
- El Corrido de Juan Charrasqueado (played at Stella Adler Theater, Hollywood)
- Watch the Border
- An Altar for Emiliano Zapata
- The Mecha Mural
- Pancho Villa

== Grants and commissions ==
- The Mecha Mural, 1995, Santa Ana College
- The Three Little Bears...Ten Years Later and *Prop 187 y Que!, Federal Block grants, 1995 and 1996
- Dia de los Muertos, 1996, The Bowers Museum, Santa Ana

== Film credits ==
- Nomination for Best Actor
- Tormenta's Ear
- Rivals
- God's Army
- America 101
- Robbing Peter
- Él de los Guantes
- Secretos 2004-Present
- Afterglow
- The Colonel: Based on the Poem by Carolyn Forche
- Delusions of Grandeur

== Music videos ==
- Britney Spears, Pieces of Me

== See also ==
- Yost Theater
- Cinema of Mexico
