= Rankin's =

Coordinates: 33.7482°N 117.8684°W

- Rankin Building
- U.S. National Register of Historic Places
- U.S. Historic district – Contributing property
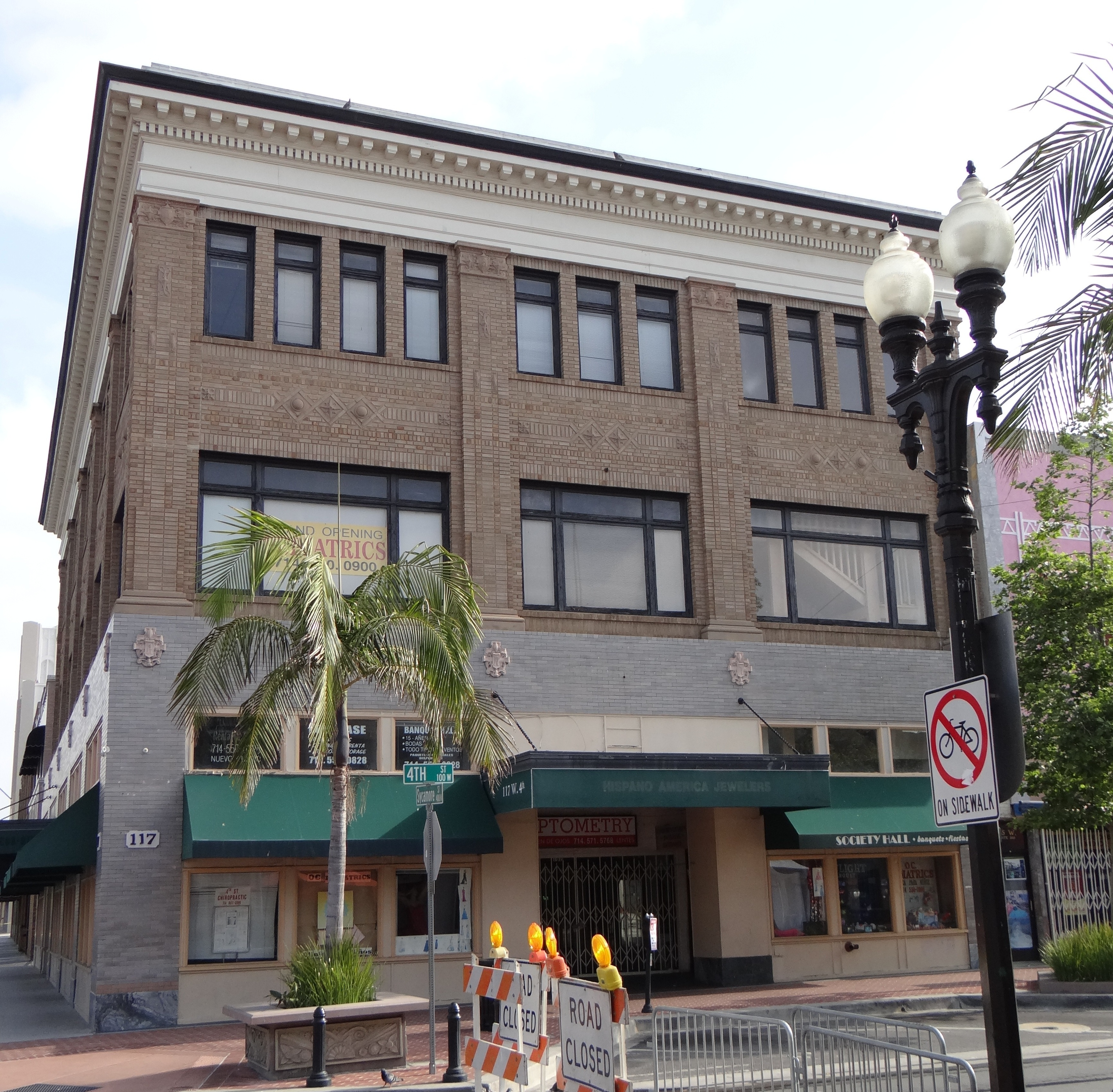
- Contemporary view of the Rankin Building

- Location within California Location within the United States
- Location: 117 West Fourth Street at Sycamore, downtown Santa Ana, California
- Area: 0.2 acres (0.081 ha)
- Built: 1917
- Built by: George Dreble
- Architect: Elwing and Tedford (Santa Ana, California)
- Architectural style: Chicago, Beaux Arts
- Part of: Downtown Santa Ana Historic Districts (ID8400438)
- NRHP reference No.: 83001220
- Added to NRHP: February 24, 1983

Rankin's was a department store at 117 West Fourth Street at Sycamore in downtown Santa Ana, California. The Rankin Building is listed on the National Register of Historic Places on its own and also as a contributing property of the Downtown Santa Ana Historic Districts.

The store had its origins as the Rankin Dry Goods company, founded in 1894. Mr. J. H. Rankin of Bloomfield, Indiana, together with T. D. Huff & Sons opened up the dry goods store on the site of Swanner's Grocery Store. The store was enlarged three times before moving into the 30,000-square-foot (2,800 m^{2}), three-story space at Fourth and Sycamore in 1917.

== Locations ==
In 1956, Rankin's announced plans to open a branch in Orange County Plaza at Chapman Avenue and Brookhurst Street in Garden Grove, now site of The Promenade at Garden Grove. The branch was to measure 28,000 sq ft (2,600 m^{2}).

In addition to its Santa Ana store, Rankin's had a location in Fullerton at Orangefair Mall from 1958.

Advertisements promoted the Orangefair branch from May 3 through September, 1959.

== Rankin Building (1917) ==
The 1917 building is a rectangular sand colored brick building featuring a grey pressed metal cornice, modified Chicago style upper level windows, and blue-grey ceramic brick on the first story. The building was rehabilitated in 1982 and the present storefront design dates from that rehabilitation program. The building is individually listed on the National Register (1983).

The architects were Elwing and Tedford of Santa Ana.

When opened on November 9, 1917, the building was referred to as the "Rutherford" building, structure or block. It was characterized as "metropolitan in nature" and "the most beautiful in the entire county".

== Gallery ==
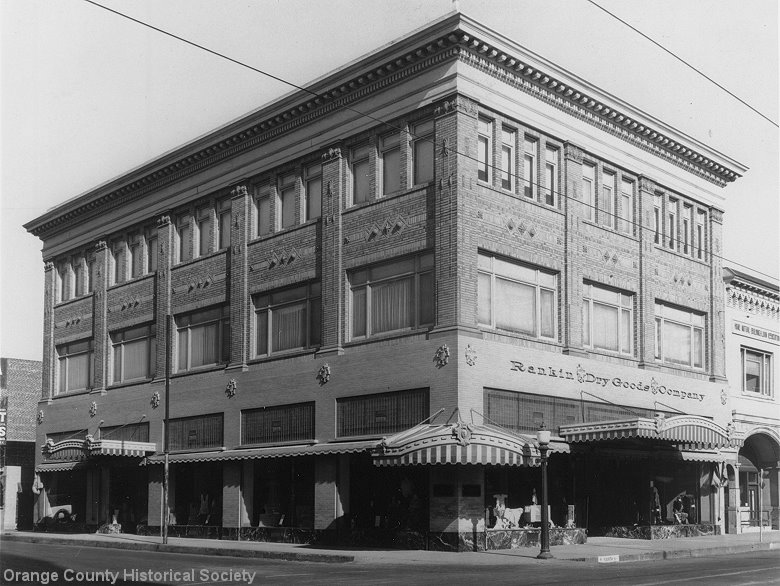
Rankin's Department Store c. 1917

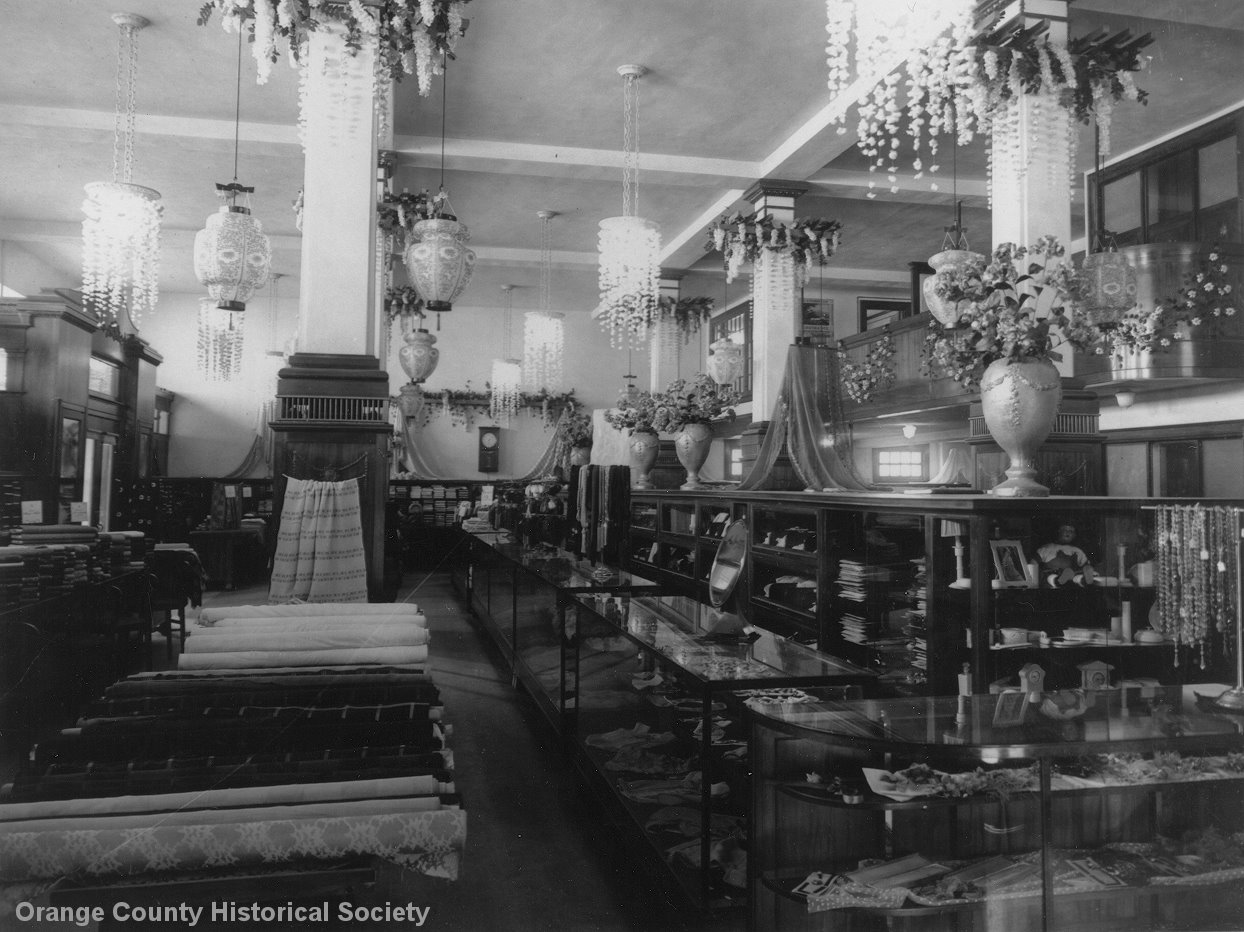
Interior of Rankin's c. 1917
