= Downtown Santa Ana =

- Downtown Santa Ana Historic Districts (North, Government/Institutional and South, Retail)
- U.S. National Register of Historic Places
- U.S. Historic district
- California Historical Landmark
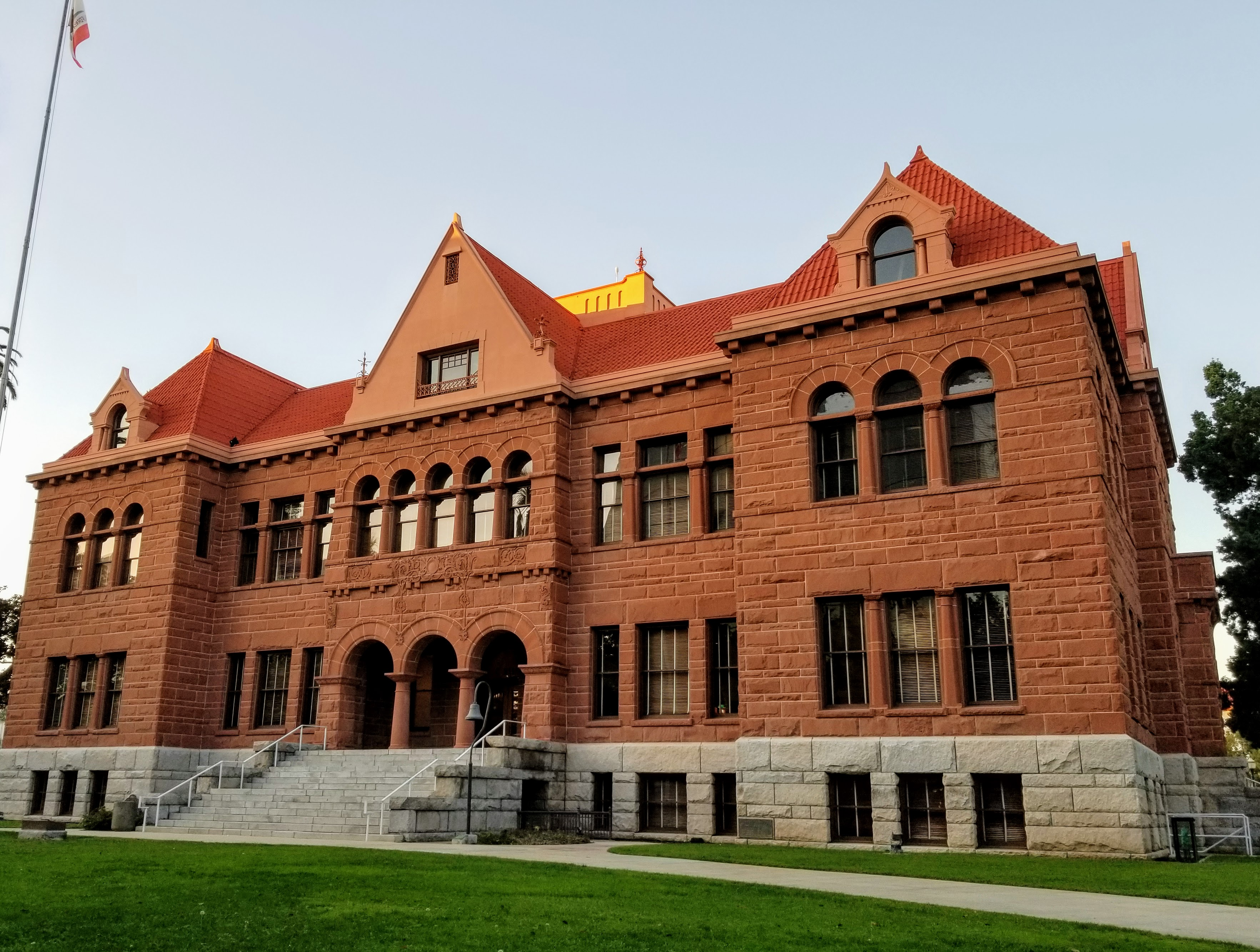
- Old Orange County Courthouse

- Location within the Los Angeles metropolitan area
- Location: Roughly bounded by Civic Center Dr., First, Ross, and Spurgeon Sts., Santa Ana, California
- Coordinates: 33°44′54″N 117°52′5″W
- Area: 24.5 acres (9.9 ha)
- Built: 1877
- Architect: multiple
- Architectural style: Late 19th and 20th Century Revivals, Moderne, Mission/Spanish Revival
- NRHP reference No.: 84000438
- CHISL No.: 204
- Added to NRHP: December 19, 1984

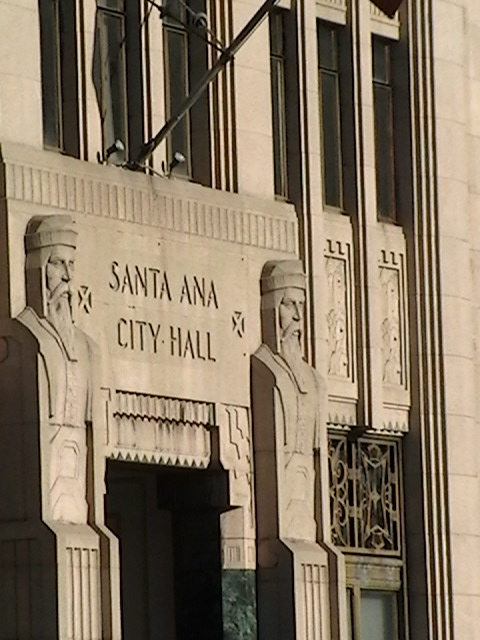
The Old Santa Ana City Hall, an Art Deco structure

Downtown Santa Ana is the central district of Santa Ana, California, and the county seat of Orange County, California. It serves as the administrative center for the city and county and contains various retail and commercial businesses.

The Downtown Santa Ana Historic Districts are listed with the National Trust for Historic Preservation and consist of numerous historic buildings across the area.

== History ==
The City of Santa Ana was established in 1869 by William Spurgeon on 74.27 acres (300,600 m^{2}) of land purchased from the old Spanish land grant, Rancho Santiago de Santa Ana. The County of Orange was formed in 1889 by William Spurgeon and James McFadden.

Santa Ana was chosen as the county seat of government because of its larger growth as a town compared to surrounding towns such as Orange. The Old Orange County Courthouse was built in 1901. The surrounding old town buildings make up the Santa Ana Historical Downtown.

== Location ==
City studies and merchant associations generally define Downtown as the area between Ross Street on the west, Minter Street on the east, First Street on the south and Civic Center Drive on the north.

Neighborhood organizations define Downtown more narrowly, extending only as far east as Main Street, with the area east of Main part of the Lacy neighborhood; the Santa Ana Regional Transportation Center train and bus station is located at the east end of Lacy along Santiago Avenue.

== Sub-districts ==
Downtown consists of several sub-districts: an institutional area including the Civic Center, the Artists Village, Calle Cuatro and the East End.

=== Civic Center ===
The Santa Ana Civic Center, also known as the Orange County Civic Center, anchors the west side of Downtown and is home to city, county and federal buildings, including:

City:

- Santa Ana City Hall (Civic Center Plaza)
- Santa Ana Civic Center Plaza (Ross, Civic Center, Santa Ana Blvd, Flower)
- Santa Ana Public Library (Civic Center Dr. & Ross)

County:

- Santa Ana Transit Terminal – Orange County Transportation Authority (OCTA) (Santa Ana Blvd & Ross)
- Old Orange County Courthouse (Civic Center, Broadway, Sycamore, Santa Ana Blvd.)
- Orange County Courthouse (Civic Center Plaza)
- Orange County Public Law Library (Civic Center Plaza)

Federal:

- Ronald Reagan Federal Building and United States Courthouse (4th & Broadway)
- Fourth District Court of Appeals (Civic Center Plaza on the corner of Santa Ana Blvd & Ross)
- Office of the District Attorney (Near the corner of Ross & Civic Center)
- Consulate of Mexico (Near Civic Center & Broadway intersection)

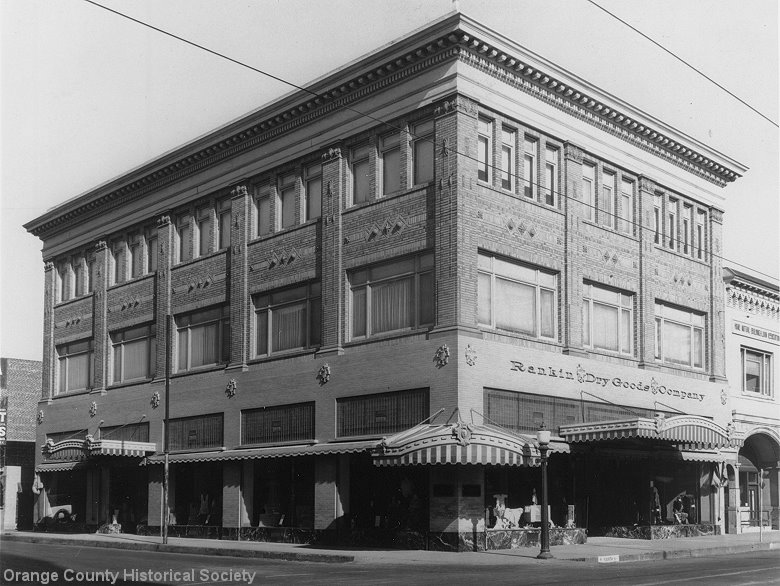
Rankin's Department Store, c. 1917

=== Fourth Street/Calle Cuatro ===
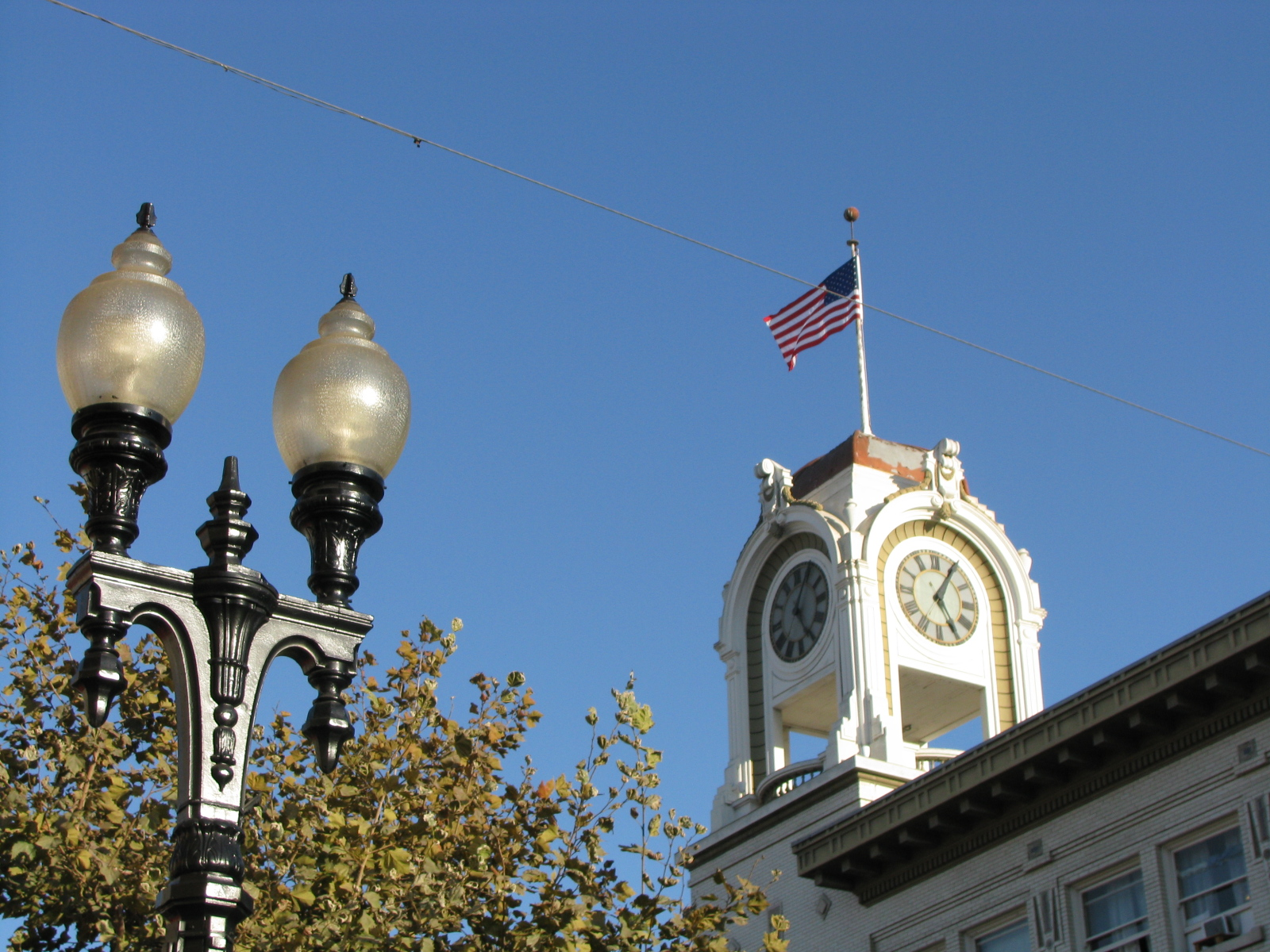
Clock Tower atop W. H. Spurgeon Building seen from Fourth St. between Broadway and Sycamore

Commercial activity in the district is centered on Fourth Street, also known as ''Calle Cuatro''. Fourth Street stretches from the Civic Center in the west. The West End sub-district is bounded by Ross Street, Broadway, and West 4th Street. It contains various dining, entertainment, and retail establishments. The middle section of Calle Cuatro (roughly from Main east to Spurgeon) has retailers

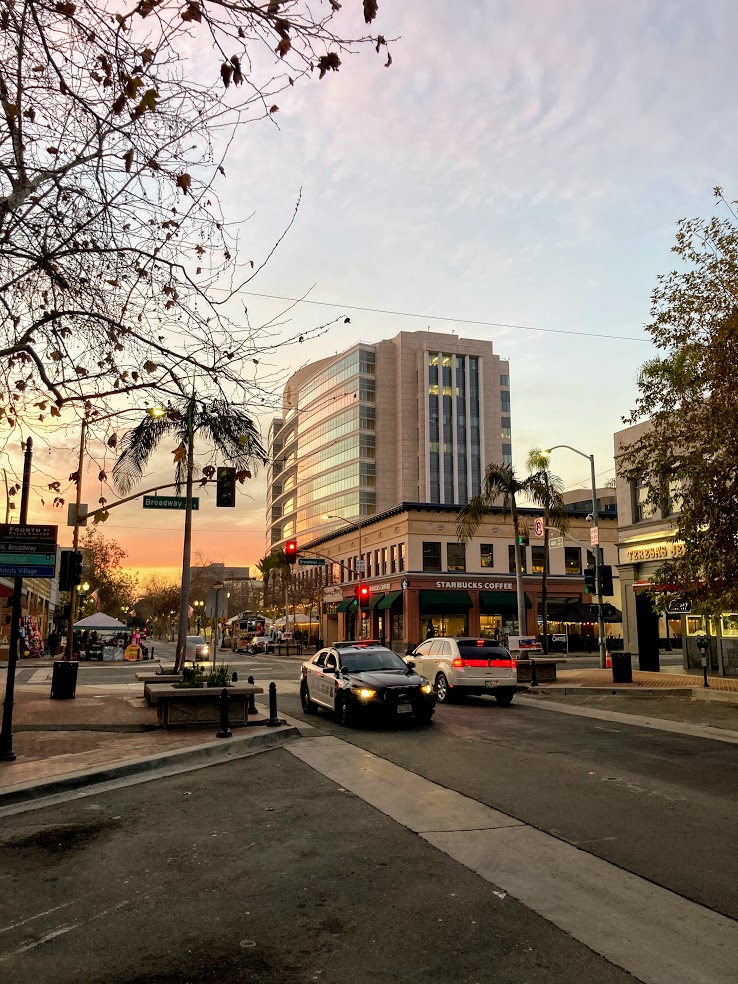
Corner of 4th and Broadway at dusk, with the Ronald Reagan Federal Building in the background

The Rankin Building, 117W Fourth Street at Sycamore, is a historic building that was usually seen as a reminder of when the Downtown Santa Ana was a shopping center, with department stores such as Rankin's, Montgomery Ward (northeast corner of Main, demolished), J. C. Penney (northwest corner of Bush) and Buffums. Eventually, the area lost business to the new malls at Honer Plaza and Santa Ana Fashion Square when they opened in 1958, and later on, to South Coast Plaza.

The East End includes the Yost Theater and the Frida Cinema, a two-screen art-house theater. In February 2015, the Fourth Street Market food hall opened in the area. Even further east, the Santa Ana Regional Transportation Center is located along Santiago Avenue in the Lacy neighborhood.

=== Artists Village ===
The Artists Village consists of art galleries, studios, offices, and restaurants located on Second Street and Broadway. The village extends from First Street to Fourth Street, Bush Street to Birch, and surrounding the Second Street Mall between Broadway and Sycamore Street.

It was originally proposed in the mid-1980s. The plan for the Grand Central Art Center was developed in 1994 and led to the designation of a ten-block area as the Artists Village. A designated ten-square block would become the Artists Village. In the early 2000s, several developments came to the downtown including Main Street Studio Lofts, East Village, and Artists Village lofts. The Artists Village has restaurants, shops and art institutions, including Cal State Fullerton Grand Central Art Center and the Orange County Center for Contemporary Art.

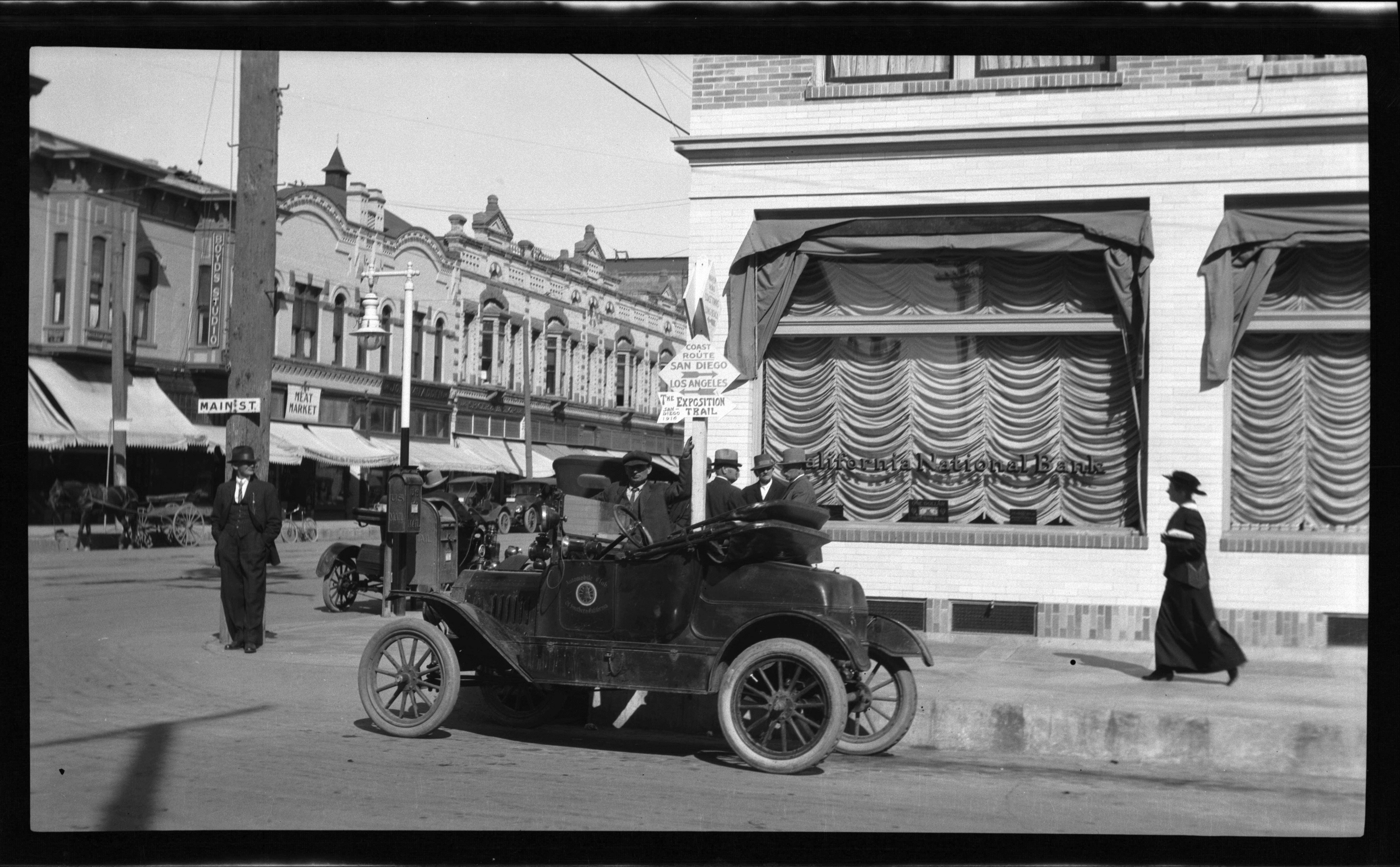
Motorists between Los Angeles and San Diego at 4th and Main, Santa Ana, 1916

=== Historic districts ===
Located across several of the aforementioned sub-districts, the Downtown Santa Ana Historic Districts are several historic districts listed as one entry in the National Register of Historic Places since 1984, covering 24.5-acre (9.9 ha) and characterized by a number of Art Deco buildings as well as two old movie houses (The West End and the Fox West Coast). The county's first courthouse, now a museum, is located at Civic Center and Broadway streets, as is the Howe-Waffle House and Medical Museum, now the Santa Ana Historical Preservation Society.

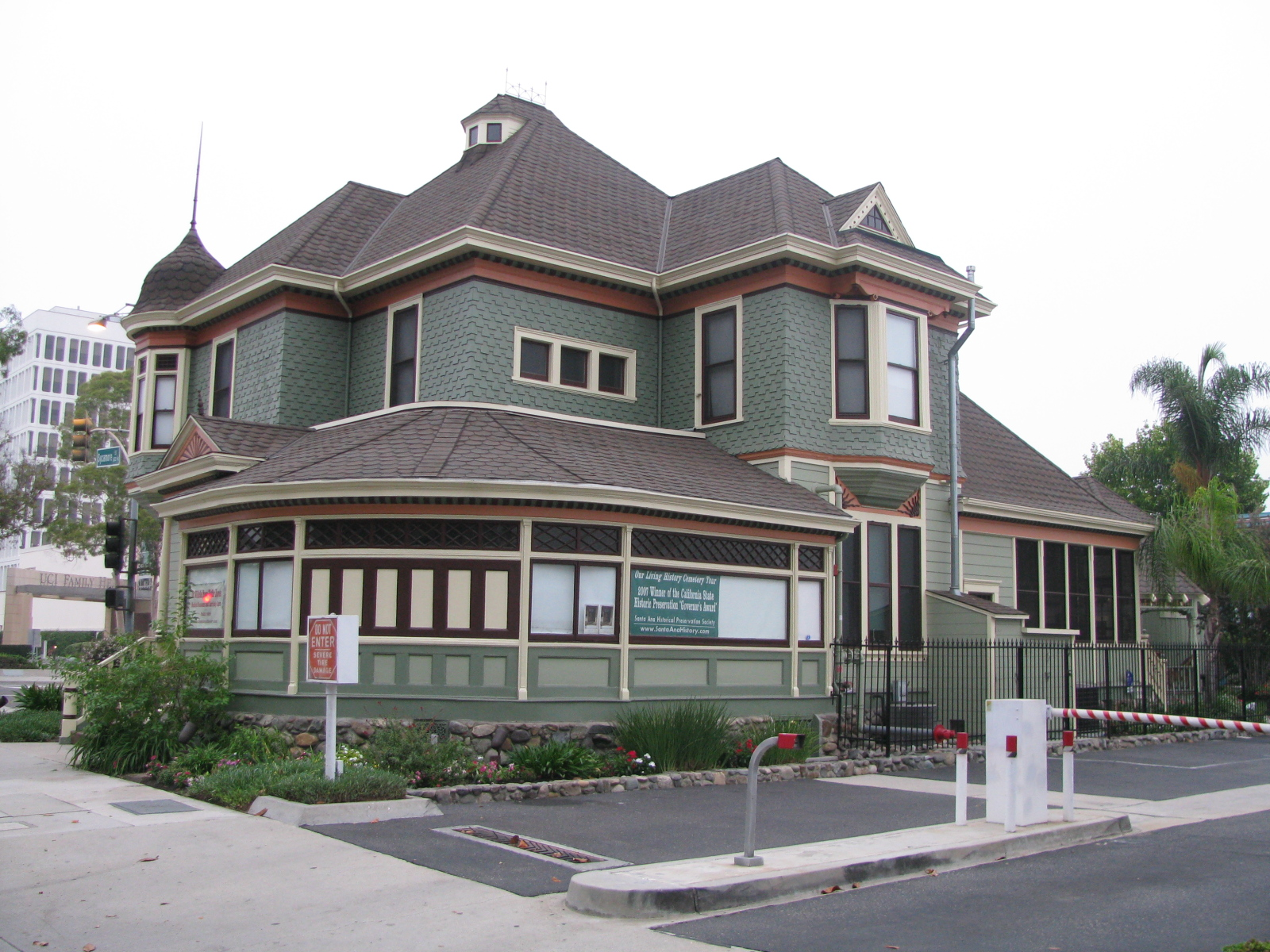
Dr. Willella Howe-Waffle House

The county's first theater, Walker's Theater, was built in 1909 on Main and Second streets adjacent to the old City Hall. The Main Street Studio Lofts is located on where the county's first movie house was used to be. Old Santa Ana was designated a California Historic Landmark (No. 204) on June 20, 1935.

== Events ==
The village has several weekly, monthly, and annual events. Some of these events include:

- 1st Saturday Downtown Art Walk
- Noche de Altares, largest free day of the dead celebration in California (the first Saturday of November)
- Fiesta Patrias (September)
- Savor Santa Ana
- OC Pride Festival
- Viva la Vida
- Patchwork Craft Fair
- Golden Years Vintage Market
- Boca de Oro Arts & Literature Festival
- Sound Downtown
- The Blading Cup (every November)
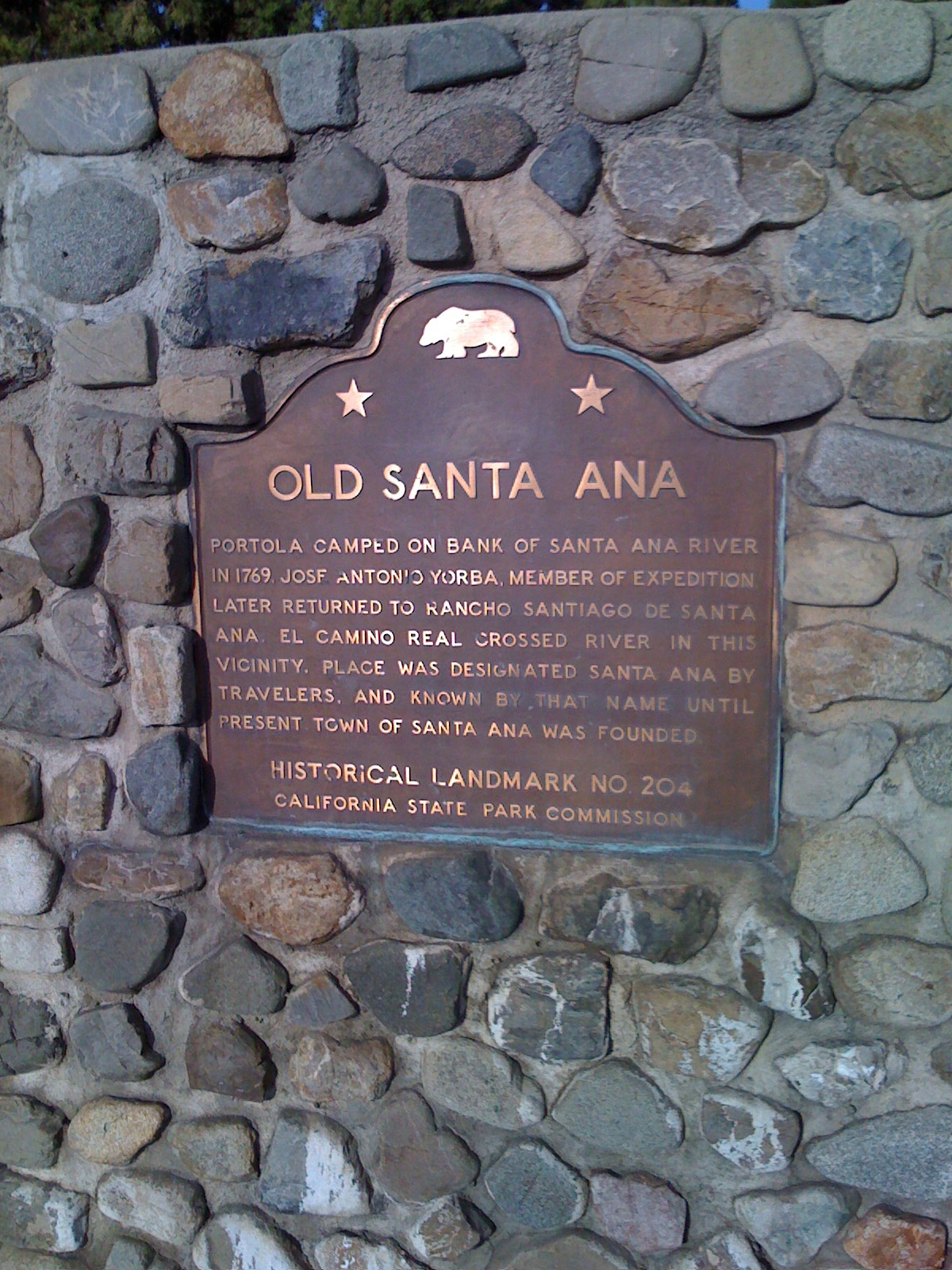
  Old Santa Ana California Historical Landmark 204

== National historic district ==
The National Register of Historic Places states that the Santa Ana Historical Downtown District is 'roughly bounded' by Civic Center Drive, 1st Street, Ross and Spurgeon. The historic district nomination form has a list of contributing properties and detailed maps of the area. The district consists of two sections with a total of 99 buildings that remain from the commercial core of Santa Ana. The buildings date from the late 1870s to the post earthquake reconstructions of 1934. The district is divided into two parts, north and south, due to a 'break' in the historic integrity.

=== Historic Landmark ===
Historic Landmark at the site reads:

Portola camped on bank of Santa Ana River in 1769. Jose Antonio Yorba, member of expedition, later returned to Rancho Santiago de Santa Ana. El Camino Real crossed river in this vicinity. Place was designated Santa Ana by travelers, and known by that name until present town of Santa Ana was founded.

— Erected by California State Park Commission. (Marker Number 204.)

== See also ==
- California Historical Landmarks in Orange County, California
