= Ronald Reagan Federal Building and Courthouse (Santa Ana) =

- Interactive map of the Ronald Reagan Federal Building and Courthouse area

General information
- Status: Complete
- Type: Federal building, courthouse
- Architectural style: Postmodern
- Location: 411 West Fourth Street; Santa Ana, California, USA
- Coordinates: 33.7485°N 117.8716°W
- Current tenants: United States government: U.S. District Court; U.S. Bankruptcy Court; U.S. Attorneys; U.S. Marshals; U.S. Trustees
- Construction started: 1996
- Completed: 1998
- Cost: US$116,000,000
- Owner: General Services Administration

Height
- Height: 176 feet (54 m)

Technical details
- Floor count: 10

Design and construction
- Architect: Zimmer Gunsel Frasca

The Ronald Reagan Federal Building and Courthouse at 411 West Fourth Street in Santa Ana, California, is a ten-story United States federal building and courthouse on 3.94 acres (15,900 m^{2}) that includes courtrooms, judges chambers, offices and courtroom galleries of the United States District Court for the Central District of California. Named for former President and California Governor Ronald Reagan in 1998, the building is owned by the General Services Administration and is 176 ft (54 m) tall.

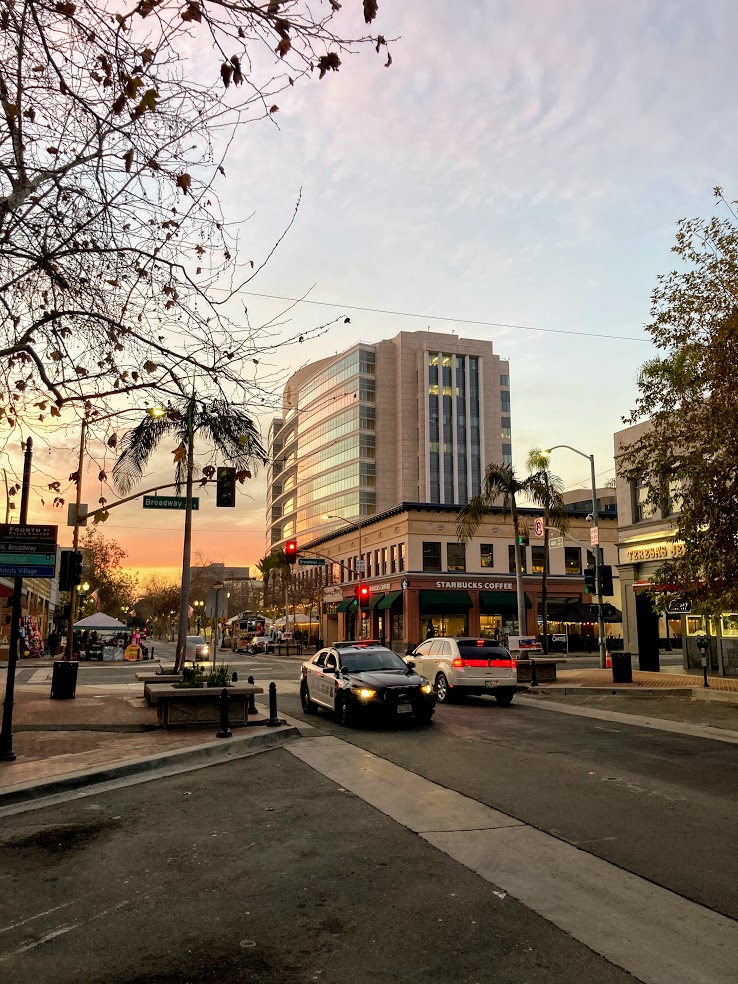
Corner of 4th and Broadway at dusk, the building can be seen in the background

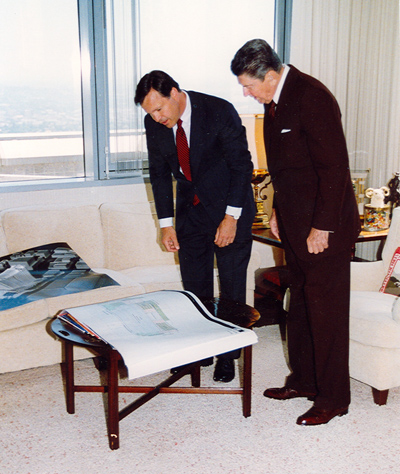
Christopher Cox shows President Ronald Reagan the blueprints for the new Federal Courthouse in 1993
