= Old Orange County Courthouse (California) =

- Orange County Courthouse
- U.S. National Register of Historic Places
- California Historical Landmark No. 837
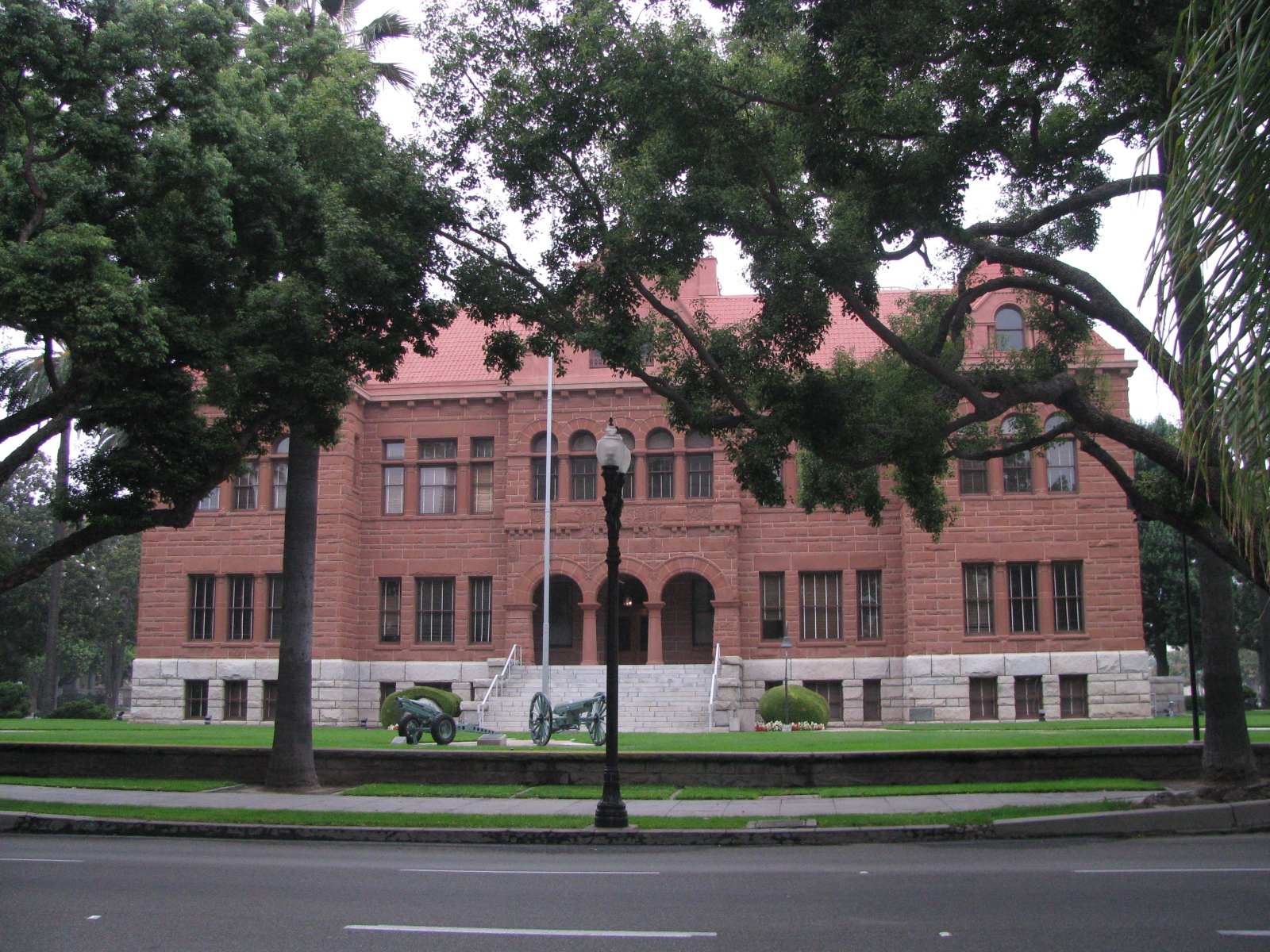
- Old Orange County Courthouse - Front View

- Location within California Location within the United States
- Location: 211 W. Santa Ana Blvd; Santa Ana, California
- Coordinates: 33°45′01″N 117°52′09″W
- Area: 1.2 acres (0.49 ha)
- Built: 1900
- Architect: C. L. Strange
- Architectural style: Romanesque Revival
- NRHP reference No.: 77000321
- CHISL No.: 837
- Added to NRHP: August 29, 1977

The Old Orange County Courthouse, at one point also known as the Santa Ana County Courthouse, is a Romanesque Revival building that was opened in September 1901 and is located in Santa Ana's Historic Downtown District on Civic Center and Broadway streets. The Old Orange County Courthouse is officially recognized as California Historical Landmark No. 837 and is also on the National Register of Historic Places.

== History ==
The city of Santa Ana was established in 1869 by William Spurgeon on 74.27 acres (300,600 m^{2}) of land purchased from the old Spanish land grant, Rancho Santiago de Santa Ana. Orange County, California was formed in 1889 by William Spurgeon and James McFadden, and Santa Ana was chosen as the county seat of government because of its larger growth as a town over surrounding towns, especially Orange.

== Museum ==
The courthouse now stands as a museum and has been used as a favorite location for different movies and television shows. It features as the exterior of Briarcliff Manor in American Horror Story: Asylum. In 1949 the courthouse exterior and interior were used for location filming for The File on Thelma Jordan.

== Gallery ==
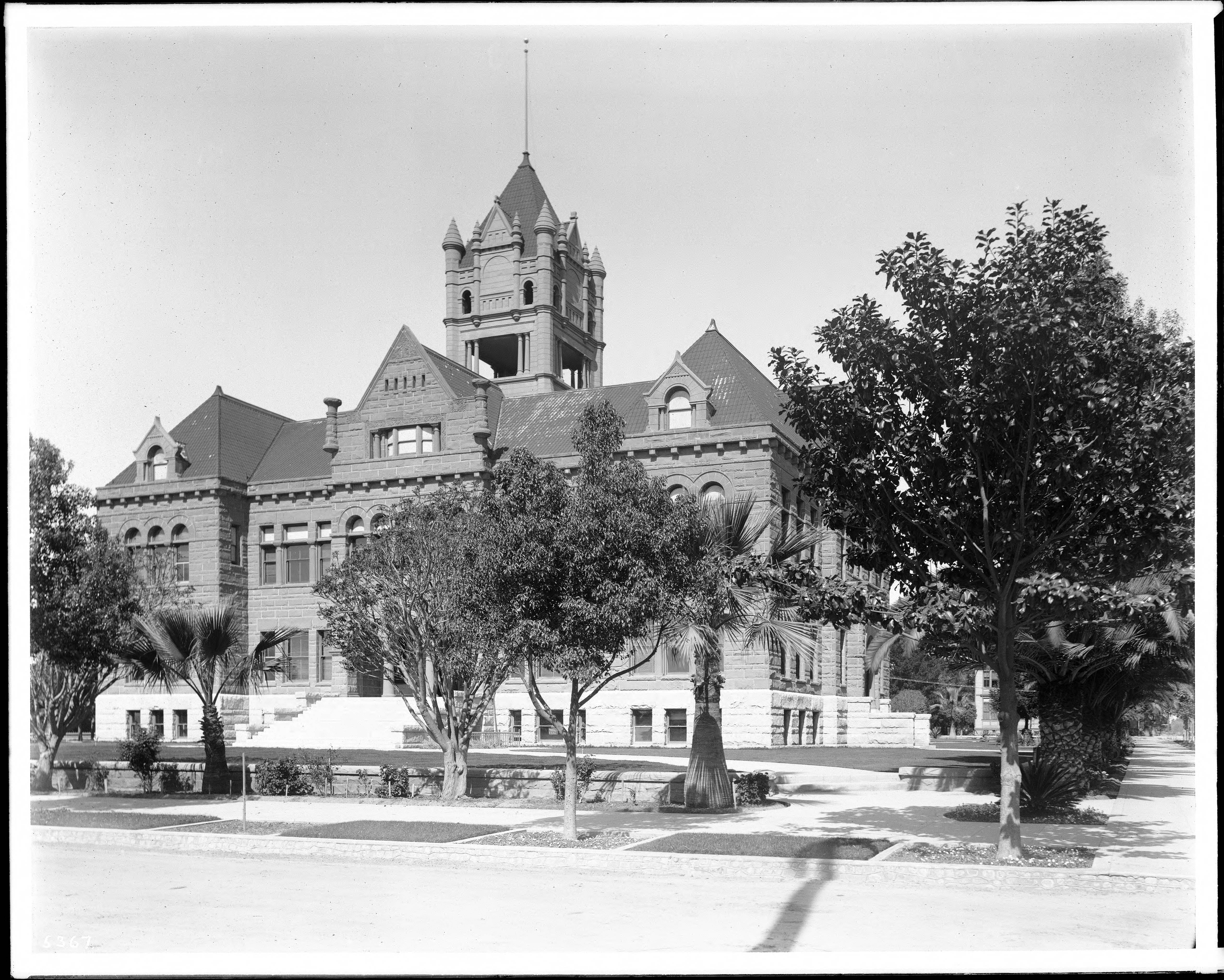
Old Orange County Courthouse as completed in 1905

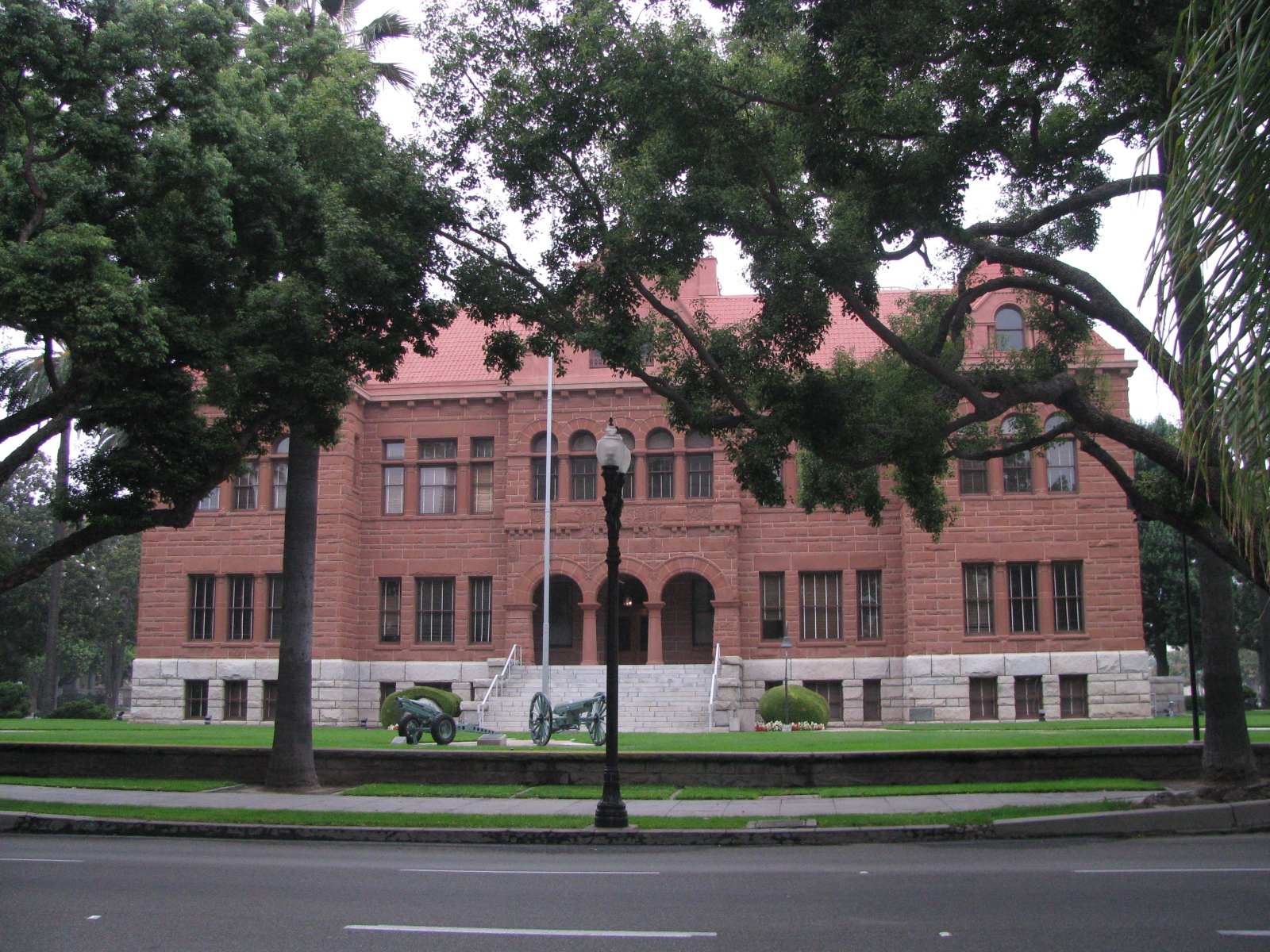
Old Orange County Courthouse - South (Front) View (2008)

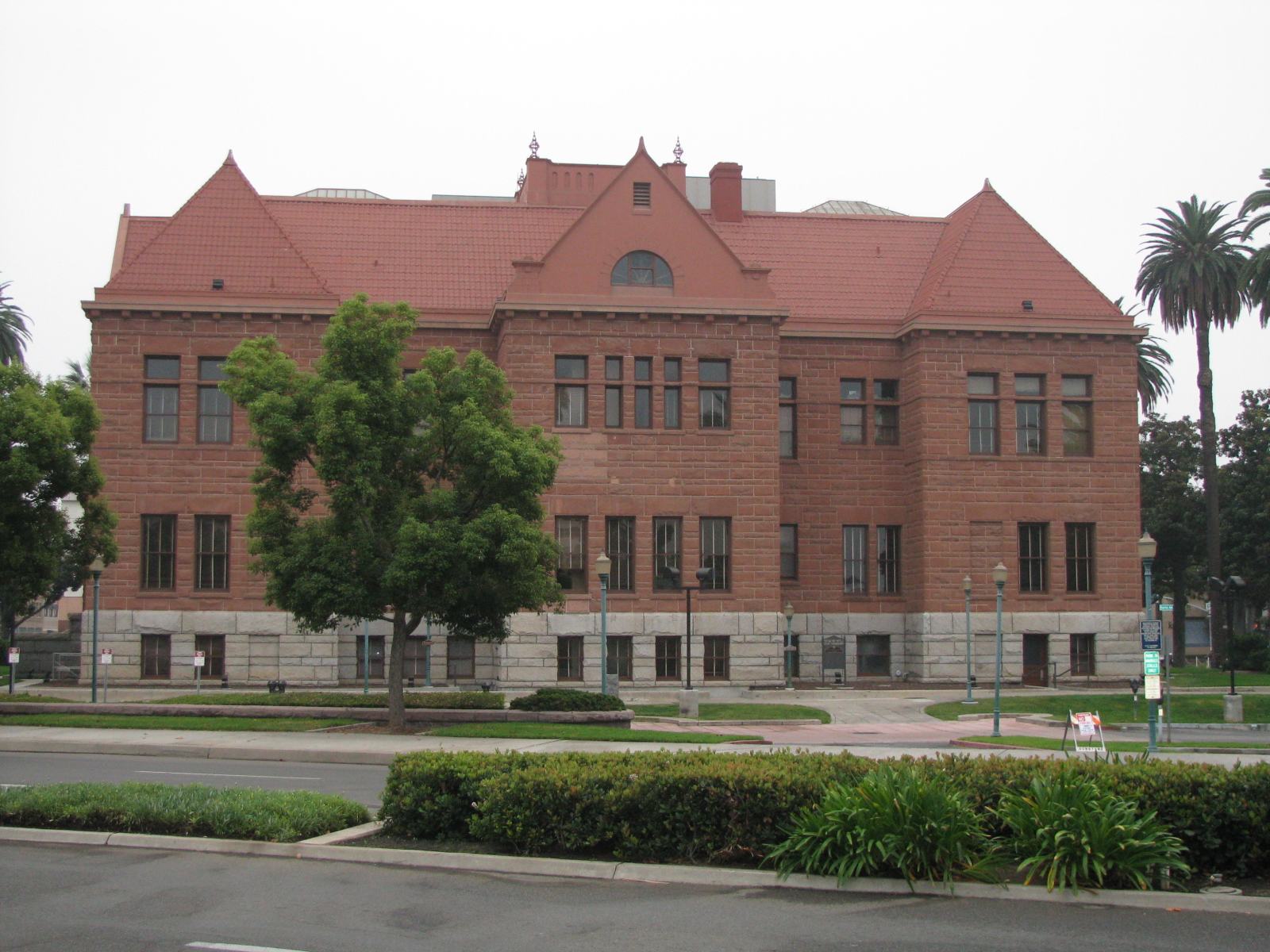
Old Orange County Courthouse - North (Back) View (2008)

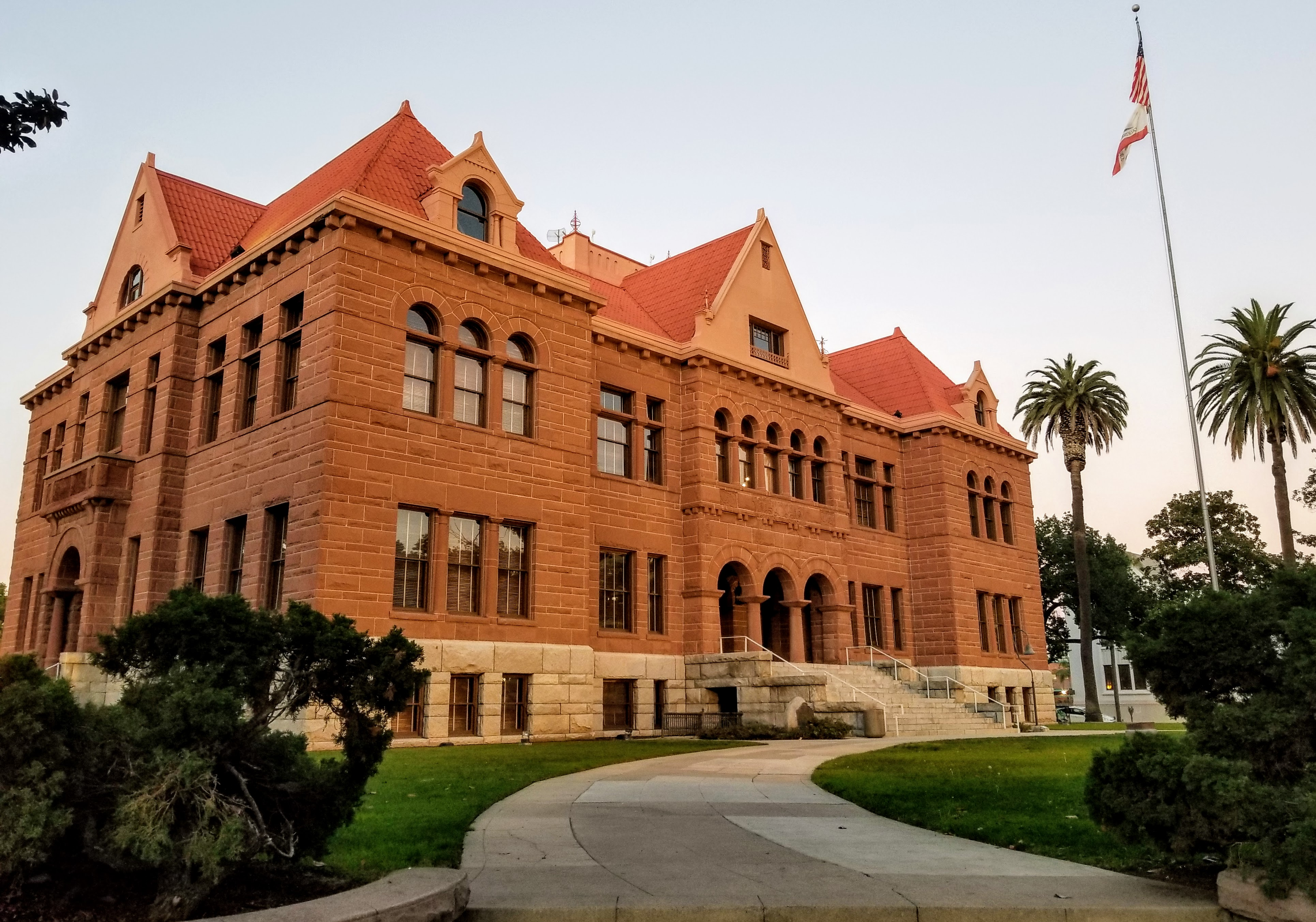
Old Orange County Courthouse - Southeast Corner (2019)

== See also ==
- Downtown Santa Ana Historic Districts
- Santa Ana, California
- National Register of Historic Places listings in Orange County, California
