= Howe-Waffle House and Carriage House =

Historic house in California, United States

- U.S. National Register of Historic Places
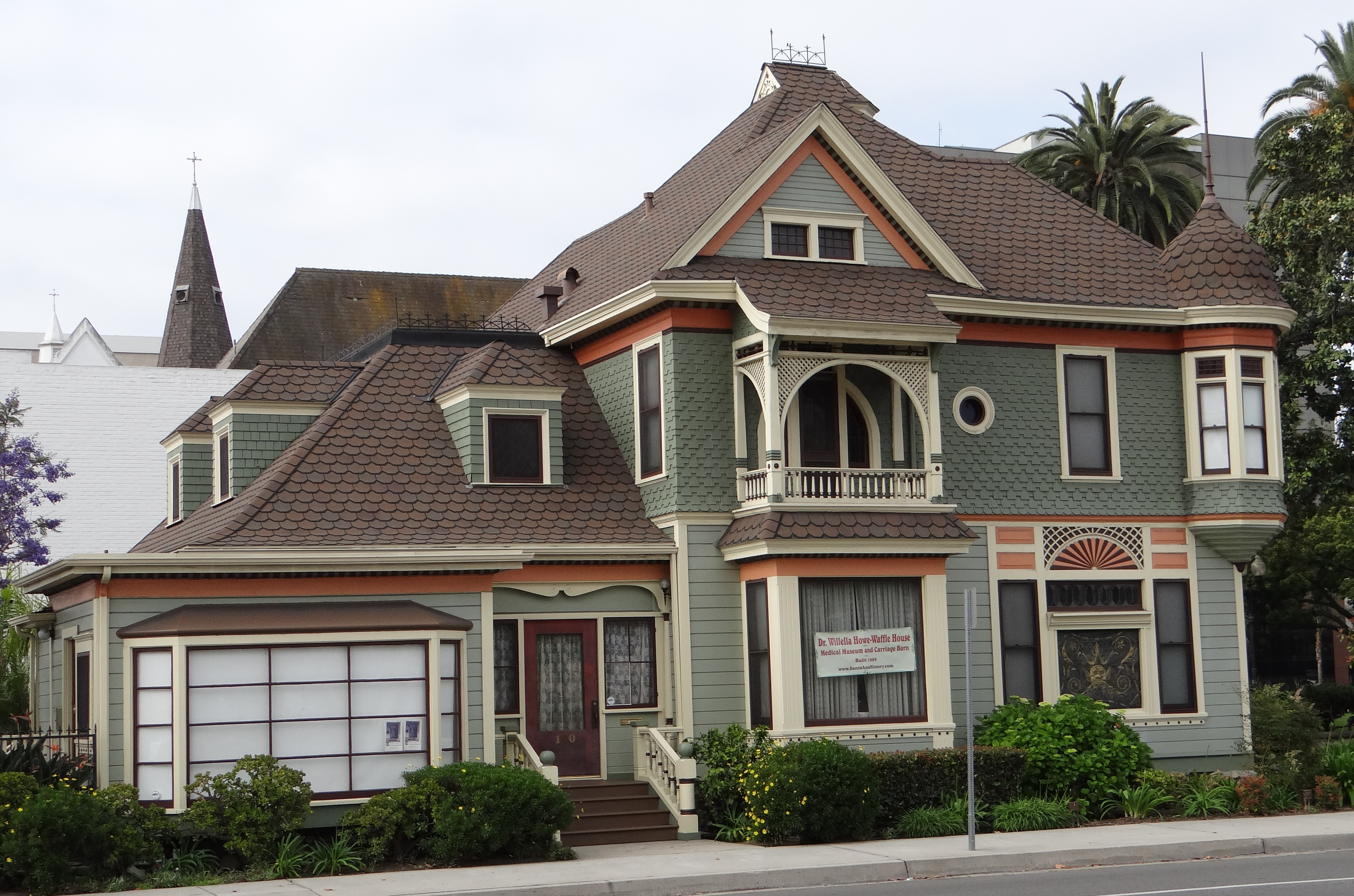

- Location within California Location within the United States
- Location: Sycamore and Civic Center Dr., Santa Ana, California
- Coordinates: 33°45′2″N 117°51′56″W
- Area: 0.3 acres (0.12 ha)
- Built: 1889
- Architect: Stoughton, George
- Architectural style: Late Victorian
- NRHP reference No.: 77000320
- Added to NRHP: April 13, 1977

Howe-Waffle House and Medical Museum is an 1889 Queen Anne style home in Santa Ana, California. It was the home of Dr. Willella Howe-Waffle, one of the first female physicians in Orange County, California, until her death in 1924.

== History ==
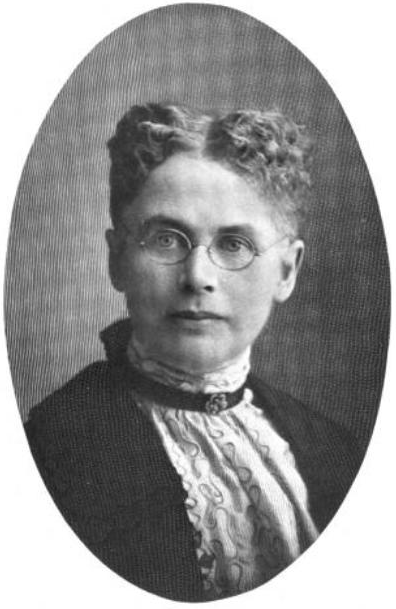
Willella Howe-Waffle

Dr. Willella Howe-Waffle was one of the first female physicians in Orange County, California. Her thirty-eight years of practice started in 1886 after she graduated from Hahnemann Medical College in Chicago. Her dedication to her patients lasted until her very last day, as she died by the bed of a patient at the Santa Ana Community Hospital in 1924. She was seventy-four years old.

Built in 1889 (the same year Orange County became a county), this Queen Anne style house was the home of Dr. Howe-Waffle until her death in 1924. In the early 1970s, the City of Santa Ana slated the home for demolition in order to widen a road, but concerned area citizens joined forces to preserve the house. Under the leadership of Adeline Walker, Friends of the Howe Waffle House formed. This group later became known as the Santa Ana Historical Preservation Society. The organization worked hard to raise awareness, and in 1974 the City of Santa Ana agreed to pay to move the house if the Society would pay for the foundation and restoration work. Between March 27–29, 1975, the City moved the house to its present location on the corner of Civic Center and Sycamore. The Society worked tirelessly over the years to restore the home to how it would have looked during Dr. Howe-Waffle's time.

The all volunteer Santa Ana Historical Preservation Society continues to run the home today as the Dr. Willella Howe-Waffle House and Medical Museum, and it is open for tours six times a year.
