= Orange County Plaza =

The Promenade at Garden Grove (orig. Orange County Plaza)
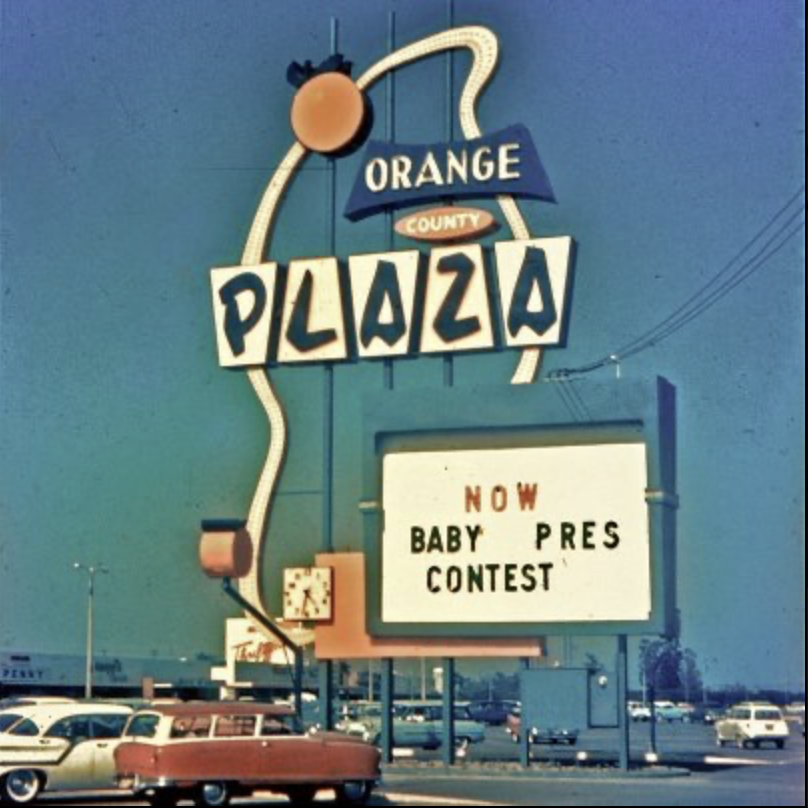
- Sign for Orange County Plaza in the late 1950s
- Location: Garden Grove, California
- Coordinates: 33.7893817°N 117.9642835°W
- Address: 9635–9959 Chapman Avenue
- Opened: 1958
- Manager: Donald H. Shanedling (original, 1958)
- Owner: HGGA Promenade (Hughes Investments)
- Architect: Jacobson, Coppedge & Huxley
- Num. of anchor tenants: 8
- Floor area: 353,217 sq ft (32,814.9 m^{2})
- Floors: 1
- Public transit: OCTA bus routes 35, 54
- Website: https://www.commercialwest.com/garden-grove-ca-promenade-at-garden-grove-860-18000-sq-ft/

Orange County Plaza, later Garden Grove Mall, Garden Promenade, now The Promenade at Garden Grove, was upon its expansion in 1959, with sixty stores, the largest shopping center in Orange County, California, and at the time billed itself as "Orange County's first regional shopping center". However, Anaheim Plaza had in fact already opened in 1955, four years prior, and had an anchor department store (The Broadway).

The open-air shopping center is located at Chapman Avenue and Brookhurst Street in Garden Grove, California, a Los Angeles suburb of 171,644 (2019 estimate).

== History ==
The center was announced in 1956 and was to cost $10,000,000. In 1956 and 1958, the project announced that Penney's, Newberry's and Grant's would locate in the Plaza, as well as the first branch of Rankin's department store of Santa Ana, which was to measure 28,000 sq ft (2,600 m^{2}) – however, Rankin's never did wind up opening a branch there.

=== First phase (opened 1956) ===
The center first opened in 1956 with 20 stores and 60,000 sq ft (5,600 m^{2}) of gross leasable area on 10 acres (4.0 ha), including:

- Thriftimart supermarket
- Economart drugstore

=== Second phase (opened 1959) ===
Phase II added 40 stores and 275,000 sq ft (25,500 m^{2}) of gross leasable area on an additional 35 acres (14 ha). This phase added the anchor stores:

- a 40,000 sq ft (3,700 m^{2}) J. C. Penney (scaled down from 65,000 sq ft (6,000 m^{2}) as originally announced)
- a 20,000 sq ft (1,900 m^{2}) W. T. Grant variety store
- a 22,500 sq ft (2,090 m^{2}) Safeway supermarket, which moved from across the street
- a 17,000 sq ft (1,600 m^{2}) Thrifty Drug Store (later became Rite Aid in 1998)
- a 10,000 sq ft (930 m^{2}) Hartfield's junior department store

=== 1979 renovation ===
in 1979 the center was known as Garden Grove Mall. There was a $5 million renovation of the mall in 1979 with new anchors National Lumber, and a new branch of Huntington Park-based 10,000 sq ft (930 m^{2}) Wineman's Department Store that opened in the east end of the mall in the fall of that year. Wineman's operated until acquisition of the chain by Boston Stores in 1984, when this and other branches were converted to Boston Stores. Additional stores that were added were McDonald's, Straw Hat Pizza, Citizens Savings and Loan, Bank of America and See's Candies. The gross leasable area at that time was 345,000 square feet (32,100 m^{2}).

== The Promenade at Garden Grove today ==
The site continues to function as a shopping center called The Promenade at Garden Grove. With 353,217 sq ft (32,814.9 m^{2}) of gross leasable area it classifies as a community shopping center a.k.a. "large neighborhood center". Anchors are Garden Grove's second Walmart (opened July 16, 2014, formerly Costco which opened in 1987 and relocated in 1994), a 16-screen Regal Cinemas, Marshalls, Ross Dress for Less, 24 Hour Fitness, Aldi, PetSmart and Dollar Tree.
