= West Anaheim =

Coordinates: 33.8322°N 117.9430°W

West Anaheim is a district in Anaheim, California which extends from Euclid Street on the East to the city limits at Cypress on the West. West Anaheim is where most of the residential development occurred during the 1950s and the 1960s, after Disneyland opened in 1955.

== History ==
The area went by a number of names such as "Loara", "Manchester", "Lincoln Park", "Magnolia Tree" and "WestGate" as the western gate to Los Angeles, the Los Angeles County boundary is in nearby Buena Park. The former US Route 101 crossed there, was named Manchester Avenue. The area was settled in the 1860s to 1890s by Midwestern and East Coast Americans, although Germans and the Dutch established farms (many were diary operations and horse ranches), groves and orchards with some grape vineyards but oranges fared better. West Anaheim was named in 1877 when the Southern Pacific railroad established a station west of Anaheim because the city refused to pay subsidies. A post office was established at West Anaheim from 1900 to 1907 by the name of Loara.

Prior to 1960, newly annexed West Anaheim mostly consisted of orange groves before Disneyland opened in 1955. The Walt Disney theme park became a success and brought a lot of business to Anaheim, and with it, a need for residential development. From 1955 when the theme park opened to 1961, Anaheim's population increased from about 14,000 people to 104,184 people, and a lot of that population growth took place in West Anaheim. Between 1955 and 1970, orange groves were cleared away to make way for new streets and new houses moving westward.

The neighborhood went through great deal of suburbanization into one of California's largest cities by population. Urban blight followed in the 1980s and 1990s, and immigrants from Asia, Latin America, Africa and the Middle East settled in large numbers. The area of West Anaheim is now mostly lower-middle class and working class. There are sections and business strips representing Arabs, Koreans and other Asians, Hispanics/Latinos, African-Americans and white Anglos. One of the blocks is called Little Gaza named for Palestinians residents since the early 2000s.

Some of the main thoroughfares in West Anaheim include Brookhurst Street, Magnolia Avenue, Beach Blvd and Knott Avenue (named after Walter Knott), which go north and south. West Anaheim roads which go east and west include Katella Avenue, Cerritos Avenue, Ball Road and Lincoln Avenue. West Anaheim is surrounded by Stanton to the south and Buena Park to the north. The Knott's Berry Farm Resort and E-Zone in Buena Park are not too far north from West Anaheim on Beach Blvd (California Highway 39), and so Beach Blvd. in West Anaheim consists of hotels and motels. Adventure City Amusement Park is also located on Beach Blvd in West Anaheim. A new West Anaheim police precinct was built in 2005 just a mile north of Adventure City, along with a youth center. Golfer Tiger Woods attended Western High School which is located in West Anaheim on the corner of Western ave. and Orange Ave.

In 2010, unincorporated sections of West Anaheim rejected city annexation into Anaheim. One of them Anaheim Island, California is divided whether or not on accepting annexation and/or forming a new city, as the community wants better public services by Orange County versus not to pay for Anaheim city taxes. Anaheim Island remains a mostly middle-class community, while they never became part of the municipality that surrounds them.

== Twila Reid ==
Twila Reid was the librarian, and highly respected, during the early years in Anaheim's history. There are a couple of public facilities in West Anaheim which have been named in her honor. West Anaheim hosts a Christmas tree lighting every year at Twila Reid Park on Orange Ave. Not far from Twila Reid Park is Twila Reid Elementary School

== Adventure City ==
The biggest attraction in the West Anaheim Resort on Beach Blvd. is the kids' amusement park called Adventure City. Some of the kids' rides include the Freeway Coaster, Barnstormer Planes, Balloon Race, Crazy Bus, Express Train, and Rewind Racers. Adventure City also has attractions such as a petting zoo, a carousel, a children's theater, and an arcade

== See also ==
- Disneyland Resort
