= List of killings by law enforcement officers in the United States, June 2011 =

This is a list of people reported killed by non-military law enforcement officers in the United States in June 2011, whether in the line of duty or not, and regardless of reason or method. The listing documents the occurrence of a death, making no implications regarding wrongdoing or justification on the part of the person killed or officer involved. Killings are arranged by date of the incident that caused death. Different death dates, if known, are noted in the description. The table below lists 30 people.

== June 2011 ==
Date	Name (Age) of Deceased	State (city)	Description
2011-06-30	Hampton, Maurice	Georgia (Atlanta)	Shot during altercation with police. The officer was conducting a traffic stop when Hampton fled on foot. The altercation and shooting followed. Hampton was not armed.
2011-06-30	Gonzalez-Valdez, Roger	Florida (Miami)	Miami detectives tricked Gonzales-Valdez, Andrew, and Lemus into believing there was a stash of marijuana at a rural house with the help of Betancourt, a confidential informant. When the men, suspected home-invaders, became suspicious, they fled outside. Police shot and killed all three alleged robbers and Betancourt. Gonzales-Valdez was shot 50 times while he was lying down on the ground. Andrew was shot as he tried to escape through a hole in the fence. Lemus was shot after he refused to surrender. Betancourt was shot after dropping his gun and lying down on the ground.
2011-06-30	Betancourt, Rosendo	Florida (Miami)	
2011-06-30	Andrew, Antonio	Florida (Miami)	
2011-06-30	Lemus, Jorge	Florida (Miami)	
2011-06-29	Ararao, Bernardo D.	California (Suisun City)	Killed in a senior center after showing a gun a woman there and telling her he was "going on assignment." Officers shot the 55-year-old man to death when he refused to drop his weapon.
2011-06-29	Cartagena, Elba (24)	Florida (St. Cloud)	
2011-06-29	Newland, Kevin Wayne	Washington (Clallam Bay)	Shot during attempted prison escape. Drove a forklift through one set of doors then into the prison's perimeter fences.
2011-06-28	DiGrandi, Edward (73)	Florida (Palm Harbor)	
2011-06-28	Christopher Seksinsky (39)	New Hampshire (Winchester)	Shot after threatening police with a knife. Police were responding to report of armed suicidal person and attempted to disarm man with Taser.
2011-06-27	Salcido, Anthony (30)	Arizona (Tucson)	
2011-06-27	Christopher Seksinsky (39)	New Hampshire (Winchester)	
2011-06-26	Haynes, Michael R	Tennessee (Memphis)	Shot after shooting at officers. Police were responding to reported of armed mentally ill person.
2011-06-25	Brennan, Carl Torrance	Florida (Jacksonville Beach)	Shot after refusing to drop weapon. Brennan was approached as the prime suspect in the recent robbery of several people in a hotel parking lot.
2011-06-23	McBride, Robert (43)	Florida (Gainesville)	
2011-06-20	Steven V. Petersen	Washington (Napavine)	Shot after refusing to take hands out of pockets and while charging at deputy. Police were responding to report of man armed with knife attempting to break into a home.
2011-06-19	Foust, William (50)	Arizona (Page)	
2011-06-15	Leon, Ernesto (43)	Arizona (Tucson)	
2011-06-15	Papineau, Brooks	Washington (Gig Harbor)	Shot during a traffic stop. Police say he pointed a gun at the officer.
2011-06-13	Gibbs, Harry (63)	Florida (Winter Garden)	
2011-06-11	Blanton, Bradley (24)	Florida (Zellwood)	
2011-06-09	O'Loughlin, Ryan	Rhode Island (Westerly)	Fatally beaten in an alley by Westerly police Officer Greg Barna, Officer Terence Malaghan, and/or Sgt. David E. Turano while passively resisting arrest. O'Loughlin, age 34, of Mystic CT died 16 hours after being arrested. The Connecticut medical examiner ruled the death a homicide due to blunt abdominal trauma.
2011-06-08	Santana, Edilberto (51)	Florida (Miami)	
2011-06-08	Duenez, Ernest	California (Manteca)	Shot by John Moody who was watching and waiting down the street for Ernest to arrive home while riding in a pickup. Video can be seen at https://www.youtube.com/watch?v=wNnwc1RByzo Moody was cleared of criminal charges by San Joaquin County district attorney James Willett, but the Duenez family pursued a civil case against him. The case was to go to trial in April 2014, but the Duenez family settled the lawsuit for $2.2 million, claiming they had lost faith in the system after the acquittals of the officers in the death of Kelly Thomas and Nick Bennallack in the death of Manuel Diaz in Anaheim. Although Moody was cleared of criminal wrongdoing, the Duenez family and their supporters have maintained that Moody is a murderer. In January 2013, a supporter of the Duenez family was charged with "threatening" Moody in a Facebook post.
2011-06-07	Bradwell, Eric (29)	Florida (Lakeland)	
2011-06-07	Farmer, Flint	Illinois (Chicago)	Shot after fleeing police responding to report of domestic violence.
2011-06-05	Schultz, James Dean	Washington (Richland)	Shot during confrontation with police who were responding to report of a suspicious person.
2011-06-03	Oliver, Phillip (28)	California (Galt)	Shot to death by officers after assaulting his mother, carrying a knife, and threatening officers, police say.
2011-06-02	Roach, Robin (30)	Arizona (Tucson)	
2011-06-01	Hortter, Adam (32)	California (Bakersfield)	Kern County Sheriffs Deputy Mike Blue was trying to detain Hortter as a suspected car burglar. They struggled and went to the ground. Deputy Blue pulled his weapon and shot Hortter who died at a local hospital.

== See also ==
- Death in custody § United States
- Henry A. Wallace Police Crime Public Database
- List of cases of police brutality
- List of countries with annual rates and counts for killings by law enforcement officers
- List of law enforcement officers killed in the line of duty in the United States
- List of law enforcement officers convicted for an on-duty killing in the United States
- List of shootings by US immigration agents
- List of police reforms related to the George Floyd protests
- List of unarmed African Americans killed by law enforcement officers in the United States
- Lists of killings by law enforcement officers
- Police brutality in the United States
- Police misconduct § United States
- Police riot § United States
- Police use of deadly force in the United States
