= Anaheim Island, California =

Unincorporated community in California, United States

Anaheim Island, Orange County, California
- Location within California Location within the United States
- Coordinates: 33°48′50.5″N 117°57′49.56″W
- Country: United States
- State: California
- County: Orange
- Elevation: 157 ft (48 m)

Population (1990)
  - Total: 6,800
- Time zone: UTC-8 (PST)
  - Summer (DST): UTC-7 (PDT)
- ZIP Code: 92804
- Area code: 714

Anaheim Island (/ˈænəhaɪm/ AN-uh-hyme; also known as Anaheim West, Rustic Lane, Southwest Anaheim, and Garza Island) consists of several unincorporated neighborhoods located in the northwestern part of Orange County, California, United States. Established between the 1910s and 1960s, the neighborhoods are bounded by the cities of Anaheim to the east, north and west, Stanton to the southwest, and Garden Grove to the south. The Orange County Board of Supervisors has referred to these unincorporated areas as "Anaheim Island" while Orange County LAFCO has referred to them variously as "Anaheim West" and "Southwest Anaheim". The Anaheim City Planning Commission refers to the entire area in the singular as the "Garza Island". Some local residents refer to the area as the "Gaza Strip".

== History ==
After World War II, Orange County experienced dramatic growth, the formation of many new municipalities, and the expansion of existing municipalities through annexation of neighboring county territory. With economic development driving expansion, cities sought to annex prosperous neighborhoods and commercial districts; neighborhoods that were less prosperous, neighborhoods with older housing stock and large families drawn by its affordability, and neighborhoods largely populated by Mexicans found themselves bypassed by city governments reluctant to provide services to aging residential districts, or to increase their minority population. Cities set their sights on the most economically productive or promising county territory; in turn, many residents of unincorporated areas resisted potential tax increases, sought to preserve community identity, and sought to preserve perceived (and often disputed) advantages of their neighborhoods' unincorporated status. Thus was born the phenomenon of the county island, either partially or wholly surrounded by municipal territory.

Since the 1960s, the unincorporated neighborhoods of west Orange County that fall within Anaheim's sphere of influence have been colloquially called the "Gaza Strip" or, more recently, the "Garza Strip". Both nicknames allude to Garza Avenue, the area's oldest and southernmost street; the area's strip-like shape; and its popularity as a dragstrip frequented by scofflaws cognizant of the county sheriff's jurisdiction and delays in response to complaints to law enforcement resulting from the distance sheriffs must travel to reach the area. Additionally, the word "Gaza" alludes to the area's unincorporated status, similar to that of the Gaza Strip of the Palestinian territories.

The mid-1990s witnessed an influx of Middle Eastern immigrants into west Anaheim, with many businesses serving the Arab American population established on a stretch of Brookhurst Street adjacent to the unincorporated areas. This migration has earned the commercial district the nickname Little Gaza, which conflates the unincorporated area's "Gaza Strip" nickname with the "Little (place name)" naming convention for ethnic enclaves. Although "Gaza Strip" is also occasionally used to describe the Brookhurst Street corridor, the term predates the arrival of significant numbers of Middle Eastern immigrants to the area.

A local urban legend has it that a fire once broke out in one of the unincorporated areas near an Anaheim city fire station, and that firemen on duty witnessed the fire but allowed the structure to burn since it was not within their jurisdiction. Although the story's veracity is questionable, its existence is generally indicative of the disputes that have often arisen between residents of unincorporated, marginalized neighborhoods in urbanized areas and the cities that surround them.

== Neighborhoods ==
Anaheim Island includes several discrete neighborhoods. Most of the homes in the area, except for those in La Colonia Independencia (see below), were built in the early 1950s, spurred by the construction and opening of Disneyland. A 2008 survey of residents found that approximately 25% of Anaheim Island homes are in need of rehabilitation. Low-income first-time homebuyers purchasing in the area are entitled to receive down payment assistance loans through the County of Orange Mortgage Assistance Program.

Demographic information cited below is drawn from the Orange County 2005-2010 Consolidated Plan, which cites 1990 United States Census statistics, gathered prior to the arrival of significant numbers of Middle Eastern immigrants.

=== La Colonia Independencia ===
La Colonia Independencia consists of approximately 30 acres (120,000 m^{2}) of residential land, 1.8 acres (7,300 m^{2}) of school maintenance yard, and less than 1 acre (4,000 m^{2}) of community center and parkland. The neighborhood is bounded by Katella Avenue on the south and Pacific Place (south of the Union Pacific Railroad tracks) on the north, between which run Garza, Berry and Harcourt Avenues. The neighborhood contains 101 single-family homes. La Colonia has approximately 1,700 residents, one-third of whom are children. 66% of its residents are Hispanic, 17% are white, 11% are of Asian/Pacific Island descent, and 4% are black. Many families have lived in the neighborhood for generations, and residents express a strong sense of ethnic and community pride.

Originally a "citrus camp" established by Mexican farm laborers at the edge of a now-defunct orange grove, La Colonia Independencia ranks with El Modena as one of the oldest surviving barrios in Orange County. The community was born after the United States' entry into World War I, when relaxation of immigration restrictions spurred by the citrus industry's demand for cheap labor drew thousands of Mexican men and their families to the United States, where they made their homes in segregated communities near the railroad tracks that ran through the groves. Misión del Sagrado Corazón, La Colonia's Catholic church, was built in 1926; Magnolia School No. 2 was established shortly thereafter on Garza Street, and was attended exclusively by Mexican students. In spite of the 1946 decision in Mendez v. Westminster outlawing racial and language-based segregation in California schools, and in spite of then-Governor Earl Warren's subsequent repeal of provisions of the California Education Code that allowed segregation in the state's public schools, Magnolia School No. 2 continued to operate until 1954, when community activist Gloria Lopez challenged the district to transfer white children into the barrio school rather than build a new one. In the face of protests from white parents, Magnolia School No. 2 was closed and replaced with a school bus warehouse. As late as the 1970s, the community had no paved streets, sidewalks or sewers. In 2001, the need to remedy public neglect of the area and address an increase in gang-related crime led county supervisors to secure federal funding for increased community services in La Colonia and the adjacent Southwest Anaheim neighborhood.

=== West Island ===
West Anaheim Island occupies approximately 187 acres (0.76 km^{2}) and contains 1,026 homes. Many of its streets bear Louisiana place-names (e.g., Bienville, Gravier, Antigua, and Perdido). The district is bounded by Ball Road to the north, by the Union Pacific Railroad tracks south of Pacific Avenue to the south, and by Brookhurst Street and Gilbert Street to the east and west. The district also includes a tract of homes at the southwest corner of Cerritos Avenue and Gilbert Street, as well as an adjacent row of homes along the south side of Pacific Avenue, immediately north of the tracks. 50% of West Anaheim Island's residents are Hispanic, 27% white, 16% Asian/Pacific Islanders (23%), and 4% black.

The West Island Neighbors Group was established after the city of Anaheim's announcement of its plans to annex the area (see below). The organization publishes a newsletter, the West Island Breeze, which is distributed to community residents.

=== Southwest Anaheim ===
Southwest Anaheim (identified as "Anaheim Island" on the Orange County Development Agency's map of the area) is an entirely residential neighborhood near the northeast corner of Katella Avenue and Gilbert Street, south of the tracks from West Anaheim and adjacent to La Colonia Independencia. The 171-home development (originally called "House and Garden Homes") was built by Tobin Developers in 1955 on approximately 29 acres (120,000 m^{2}) of residential land. 60% of Southwest Anaheim's residents are Hispanic, 23% are Asian/Pacific Islanders, and 17% are white.

=== Sherwood Forest and Thistle development ===
Sherwood Forest is a development of 406 homes built in 1955, occupying approximately 95 acres (380,000 m^{2}) of residential land bounded by Brookhurst Street and Gilbert Street to the east and west, and by Orange Avenue and Ball Road to the north and south. 39% of Sherwood Forest's residents are white, 31% Hispanic, 24% Asian/Pacific Islanders, and 4% black. Adjacent to Sherwood Forest and located between Orange Avenue and Broadway is the distinct, also unincorporated, 88-parcel Thistle development.

For purposes of community planning and needs assessment, the Orange County Board of Supervisors groups two additional, non-contiguous county islands bounded only by Stanton and Garden Grove with those adjacent to Anaheim, due to their proximity. These two islands are not, however, included in the city of Anaheim's annexation proposals (see below).

=== Rustic Lane ===
The Rustic Lane neighborhood is located north of Katella Avenue between Gilbert Street and Magnolia Avenue. The 9-acre (36,000 m^{2}) district houses 1,736 people in 347 housing units. 66% of Rustic Lane's residents are Hispanic, 17% white, 11% Asian/Pacific Islanders, and 4% black.

=== Mac Island ===
Mac Island contains 116 single-family homes occupying approximately eighteen acres of land near the northwest corner of Katella and Magnolia Avenues. 62% of the neighborhood's 441 residents are white, 17% are Hispanic, and 17% Asian/Pacific Islanders.

== Education ==
Anaheim Island students are served by the elementary schools of the Anaheim City School District and the Magnolia School District. The Anaheim Union High School District provides middle schools and high schools for the Anaheim Island.

The Anaheim Public Library and the Stanton branch of the Orange County Public Libraries system both serve Anaheim Island residents.

== Public safety ==
Police protection services in the Anaheim Island neighborhoods are provided by the North Operations Patrol Bureau of the Orange County Sheriff's Department. Traffic enforcement is the responsibility of the California Highway Patrol. Fire protection and emergency services are provided by the Anaheim Fire Department through a contractual agreement with the Orange County Fire Authority.

== Annexation controversy ==
In 1994, Orange County declared the greatest municipal bankruptcy in United States history, the result of a $1.7 billion loss sustained after Treasurer-Tax Collector Robert Citron invested county funds in various risky financial instruments. Since that time, county officials have sought to reduce and eventually eliminate county responsibility for provision of municipal services such as policing, street sweeping, trash removal and building code enforcement, in order to focus greatly diminished county resources on provision of regional services such as public health, social services, flood control, environmental protection and regional planning. One means of achieving this goal has been to encourage municipalities within the county to annex unincorporated areas within or adjacent to their boundaries.

Reduction of the number of unincorporated islands in California municipalities has been an express priority of the California state legislature since the passage of the Cortese-Knox-Hertzberg Local Government Reorganization Act of 2000. The Act establishes procedures for annexations and consolidations of cities or special districts, and delegates responsibility for the process to Local Agency Formation Commissions (LAFCOs). Among the purposes of LAFCOs are the encouragement of the orderly formation, development and consolidation of local agencies and the discouragement of urban sprawl. The Cortese-Knox-Hertzberg Act allows cities to annex areas up to 150 acres (0.61 km^{2}) without a vote by property owners; however, annexation can be blocked by a petition signed by over fifty percent of voters.

In April 2005 the Anaheim City Planning Commission reversed its historic opposition to proposals to annex the "Gaza Strip" and approved a plan newly developed by the Orange County LAFCO. City and county officials and Anaheim Island homeowners who supported the plan contended that annexation would result in increased efficiency in the provision of community services and decreased police response time; that more assiduous building code enforcement would improve residents' quality of life and slow neighborhood blight by reducing the number of illegal garage-to-apartment conversions and substandard repairs, and by motivating property owners - many of them absentee landlords - to adequately maintain deteriorating homes; and that grant-assisted upgrades from septic systems to sewer hookups would increase home values and lessen the potential for groundwater contamination.

After learning of the plan, a group of Anaheim Island residents formed the West Island Neighbors Group and circulated a petition opposing annexation. Opponents of the plan argued that annexation would result in increased taxes and public utility rates, and new municipal fees and permit requirements; that city zoning regulations would prevent residents from keeping farm animals and running kennels; that residents would be inconvenienced by the designation of new street addresses for their homes; that more stringent building code enforcement and requirements for sewer hookups would result in excessive expense to homeowners with limited incomes; and that property might be confiscated for redevelopment. Residents of La Colonia expressed particular concern that annexation would pave the way for the destruction of their neighborhood through gentrification, the fate of old county barrios such as La Conga, razed and replaced with a parking lot for Anaheim's Glover Stadium. Concerned with the prospect of a shrinking patrol area, the Association of Orange County Deputy Sheriffs mailed a flier opposing annexation to area residents. The anti-annexation petition eventually gathered 1,944 signatures, and the plan was defeated in October 2005.

The "Save Our Islands" petition was prepared by an Arlington, Virginia political consulting firm, and thousands of copies were distributed to Anaheim Island residents. However, although the petition included a contact telephone number and address, it lacked a statement regarding the source of financing for the anti-annexation campaign, and did not identify the organization or individuals that sponsored it. In withholding this information, opponents of annexation availed themselves of a loophole in the Cortese-Knox-Hertzberg Act. At the time of the campaign, the statute's campaign finance disclosure requirements specified their applicability to petitions for and against reorganization of municipal boundaries that have reached the ballot stage, but not to protests of proposals by a LAFCO functioning in its capacity as a "conducting authority" responsible for implementing boundary changes and considering citizen feedback.

In January 2006, the Orange County Planning Board resolved to introduce legislation to close the loophole. Following his election to the California State Assembly, former Orange County Supervisor Jim Silva introduced an amendment to the Cortese-Knox-Hertzberg Act mandating disclosure of sponsors, contributions and expenditures for campaigns for and against annexation proposals approved by LAFCOs at any stage of the process. The amendment was approved by unanimous vote of the California legislature, signed into law in July 2008, and further amended in March 2009.

In January 2009, the Orange County LAFCO began to encourage owners of unincorporated property whose lots abut Anaheim city limits to apply for annexation on an individual basis, offering a waiver of the usual $7,900 fee charged for changing a property's jurisdiction from the county to Anaheim. Between January 2009 and May 2010, over 100 Anaheim Island property owners filed annexation applications, 20 pertaining to parcels in the 88-parcel Thistle development. The Orange County LAFCO subsequently proposed to annex the entire Thistle neighborhood to the city of Anaheim; however, a new petition opposing annexation attracted enough signatures to require a special election, which was held August 31, 2010. The annexation measure received a total of 35 "yes" votes and 84 "no" votes, and was therefore defeated.
