= Carnegie Library (Anaheim, California) =

Building in California, United States

- U.S. National Register of Historic Places
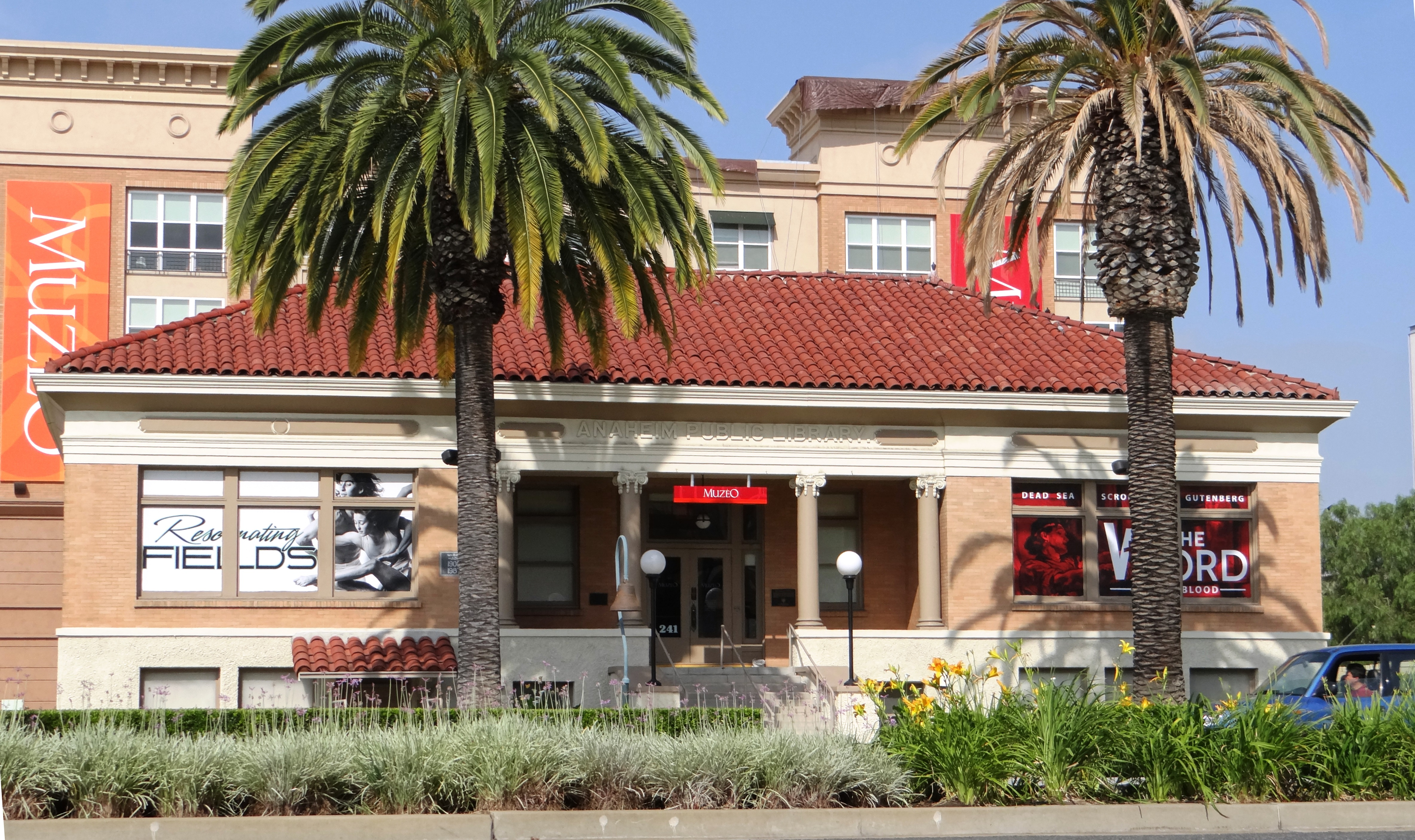

- Location within California Location within the United States
- Location: 241 S. Anaheim Blvd., Anaheim, California
- Coordinates: 33°50′0″N 117°54′45″W
- Area: 0.5 acres (0.20 ha)
- Built: 1908
- Architect: John C. Austin
- Architectural style: Classical Revival
- NRHP reference No.: 79000511
- Added to NRHP: October 22, 1979

The Carnegie Library is a Classical Revival style building in Anaheim, California, United States. A Carnegie library built in 1908, it was designed by John C. Austin, and opened in 1909.

It was a public library until 1963. During the 1970s it served as the personnel office for the City of Anaheim. It is now one of the buildings of the MUZEO, a museum of local culture, history and art.

The Anaheim Carnegie Library was listed on the National Register of Historic Places in 1979.

It is the only Carnegie library remaining in Orange County; others in Fullerton, Orange, Santa Ana, and Huntington Beach did not survive.

== See also ==
- National Register of Historic Places listings in Orange County, California
