= GOALS (nonprofit organization) =

American nonprofit organization

GOALS (Growth Opportunities through Athletics, Learning, and Service) is a nonprofit organization based in Anaheim, California, which offers programs to aid low income children in the Anaheim area. GOALS is currently headquartered in central Anaheim and has community partnerships organized in 12 greater Anaheim communities in the city of Anaheim, the city of Placentia, the city of Huntington Beach, and the city of Fullerton.

== Origins ==
GOALS was originally established in 1994 as an outgrowth of the Walt Disney Company's acquisition of the then named Mighty Ducks of Anaheim professional hockey franchise. Not Since then, this not-for-profit program has expanded into many low-income communities, fielding a combination of educational enrichment, team and fitness-oriented athletics, and community service activities where GOALS youth help others. While GOALS is the worldwide leader in providing ice hockey access for minority children, the program has taken major strides in other sports opportunities such as lacrosse, soccer, tennis and roller hockey. Currently, the program involves more than 2,000 youth ages six to nineteen each year. GOALS operates indoor and outdoor facilities and a bus fleet, and provides all necessary equipment, insurance, coaching, teaching, and supplies all at no charge to participating youth. GOALS organizes activities within designated under served communities and links those areas to central GOALS facilities with a community bus network. One of the hallmarks of the GOALS program is that youth are required to serve through a "Summer of Service" in an innovative arm of the program called GOALS Cadets. This initiative leads efforts to read storybooks to children in school, clean up parks, paint out graffiti, through a program called GOALS CityPride, coach disabled young people through GOALS Special Sports, visit veterans at local VA hospitals, and pack food for local food distribution centers that support the poor.

== Growth ==
In 2005, GOALS began a strategic expansion in close partnership with the city of Anaheim, with the opening of GOALS Gardens, an adaptive reuse of the indoor Martin Recreation Center in Anaheim's La Palma Park. This 8,000-square-foot (740 m^{2}) indoor center was renamed and renovated with an indoor rink and has become the home for roller hockey, indoor soccer, and some adaptive recreation utilizing ringette hockey as a feature sport. GOALS expanded a bus fleet to meet increased geographic growth into neighboring cities adjoining Anaheim and ferries hundreds of low income youth daily to and from GOALS facilities. In 2009, GOALS dropped the "Disney" from its name as a joint decision made by both organizations. The entertainment corporate giant still provides some support to the community-based organization with the hope that other regional entities will expand their level of support for the betterment of low income children and families.

GOALS operates a host of interrelated community based programs often partnering with regional school districts to do so. These include the Anaheim Elementary School District, Anaheim Union High School District, Magnolia School District, Placentia Yorba Linda Unified School District and Ocean View School District. GOALS has long had an effective partnership with multiple civic agencies including the City of Anaheim Community Services Department, Anaheim Police Department, Anaheim Public Works Department, and many others.

GOALS programs all revolve around (free) opportunities in athletics, learning and service. GOALS is the largest diversity program for ice hockey in America and also fields programs in lacrosse, soccer, basketball, tennis, Olympic handball, roller hockey, and skating. GOALS operates major after school enrichment programs in multiple communities, hosts a morning enrichment program for children who are not attending school, and operates a local (free) public school (see GOALS Academy below).

== Dreamscape development ==
In 2010, GOALS opened the 28,000-square-foot (2,600 m^{2}) Dreamscape, which features two championship tennis courts, circumferential track for jogging and fitness, a 6,000-square-foot (560 m^{2}) artificial turf arena for field sports, a small community garden, and a 1,400-square-foot (130 m^{2}) fitness gym with anaerobic fitness equipment. The McCarthy Construction Company led a group of 37 construction and design firms to create this mufti-million dollar facility as a massive community service project. In the summer of 2017 a major second phase: Dreamscape Too, with a basketball center, volleyball center and synthetic ice skating rink on a nearby 28,600-square-foot (2,660 m^{2}) land parcel in north central Anaheim opened and substantial community expansion followed. Multiple benefactors have stepped forward to support this innovative regional program, most prominently Disneyland, the Orange County Community Foundation through the ACT collaborative, LA 84 Foundation, The Ueberroth Family Foundation, Eisner Foundation, Ben's Asphalt, the Los Angeles Lakers among many others. The City of Anaheim, Tait & Associates, Berg Electric, McCarthy Construction Company, and RJ Noble have also stepped up on multiple occasions to assist GOALS especially with their landmark facility development to involve more underserved children free of charge.

GOALS has continued to support community needs in creative ways and in 2015 opened the first free public charter school in the City of Anaheim. GOALS Academy was founded by GOALS as a Kindergarten to 6th grade elementary school located in north central Anaheim. More than 230 youngsters attended this school daily, and a well attended after school program has been operated by GOALS daily from the same location.<Anaheim Bulletin, May, 2015>

In 2018 GOALS launched a major development initiative dubbed "A Better Community" or ABC for short. This model community project led to a major physical restoration of a clubhouse and large "common" area within a very deteriorated neighborhood in west Anaheim. Within 1 year this area was transformed with over 35,000 of activity improvements and daily free GOALS programs were installed. Among these were a recreation rink built by the Anaheim Ducks, small tennis court, tetherball court, amphitheatre, grass picnic and play zone, handball court, the ABC garden and a 1,000 square foot clubhouse. Hundreds of children and family members have benefited greatly and this initiative stands as an affordable and sustainable. urban model

In mid 2020 GOALS separated the charter school operation into a separate not for profit entity called "Anaheim Academy". GOALS has set a strategic focus on expansion of service projects to support municipal partners and anticipates adoption of further major service projects. In addition GOALS is pursuing efforts to restore and operate a youth mountain camp with a plan to create up to 1,000 free annual camping slots for "at-promise" youngsters. The plan simultaneously involves major service commitments to bolster environmental needs in southern California forests. The current expectation is that the "Camp GOALS" endeavor will be in development mode throughout 2021 and operating on a phased in basis by the summer of 2022.
