= Extron =

US audiovisual equipment manufacturer

- Type: Privately held company
- Industry: Commercial Audio Video System Automation and control
- Founded: 1983
- Headquarters: 1025 East Ball Road Anaheim, California, United States
- Key people: Andrew C. Edwards (Chairman); Brian Taraci (CEO); Casey Hall (CMO); Ed Ellingwood (CFO)
- Number of employees: 1001-5000 employees
- Website: www.extron.com

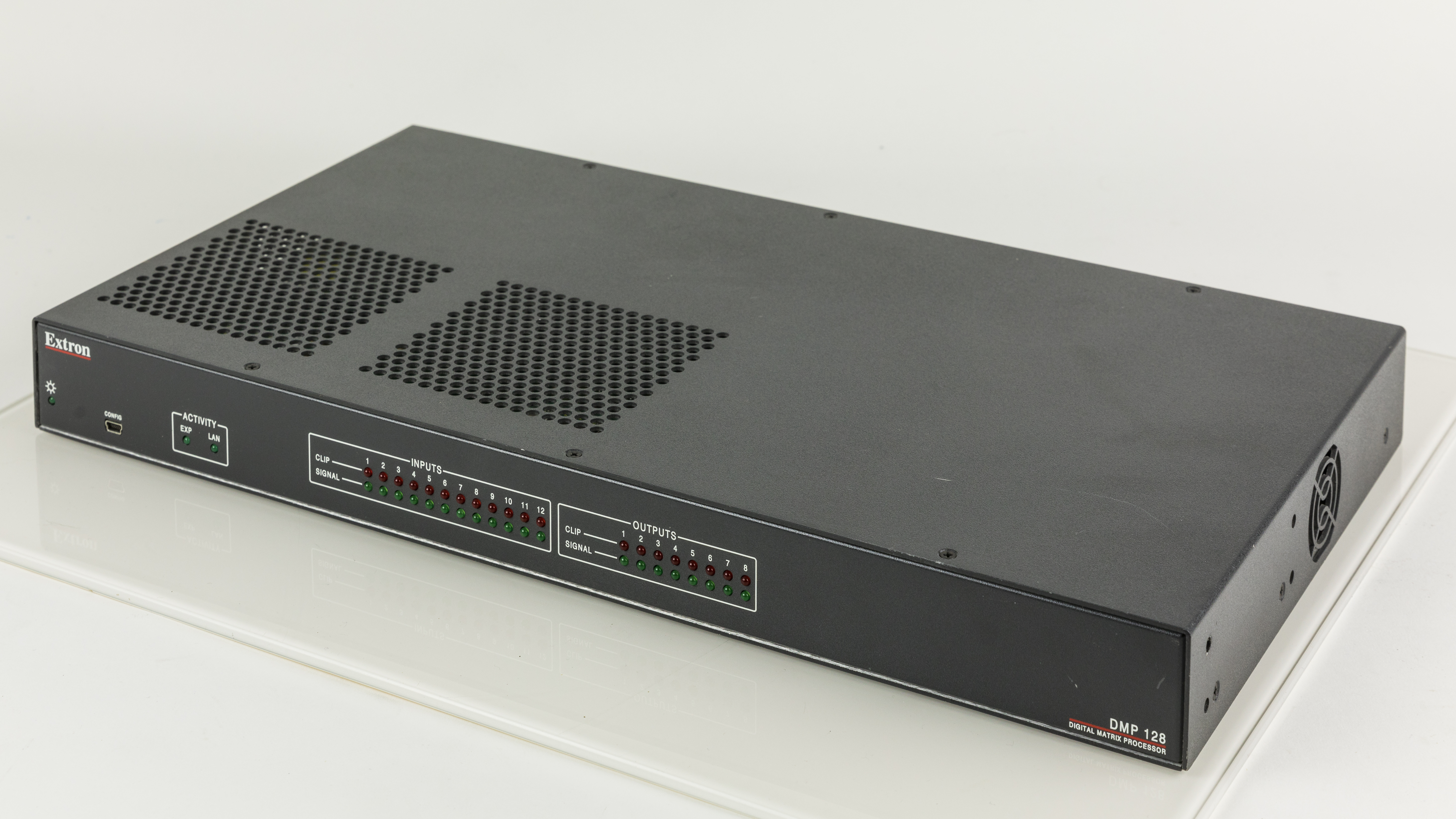
Extron DMP 128 - 12x8 ProDSP™ Digital Matrix Processor

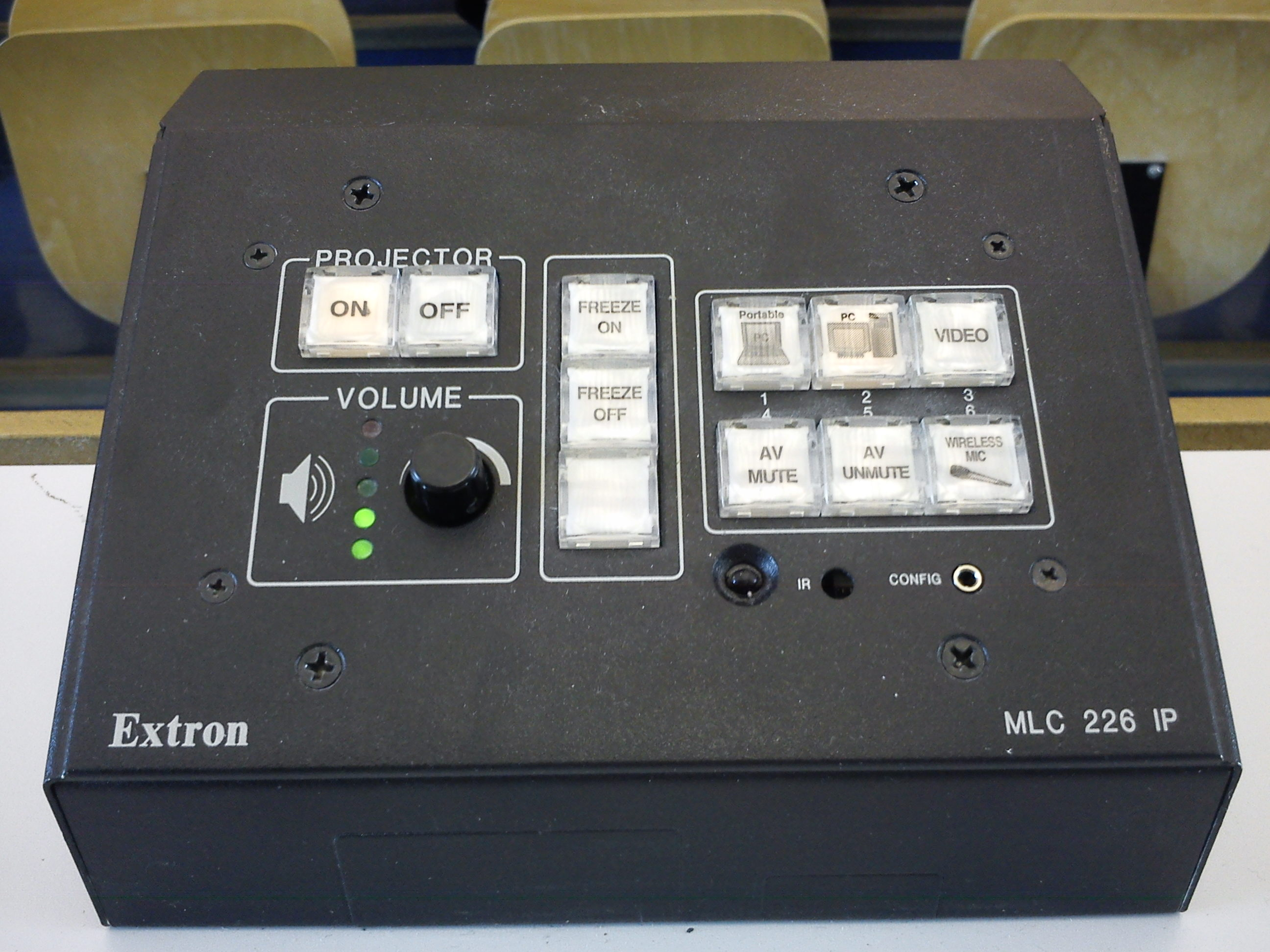
MLC 226 IP - Enhanced MediaLink Controller with Ethernet Control

Extron, formerly known as Extron Electronics, is a manufacturer of professional audiovisual equipment. It is headquartered in Anaheim, California. Extron operates over 30 offices and regional training and demonstration facilities around the globe.

== Overview ==
Extron products are used in video and computer interfacing, switching, and signal distribution to professional displays and projectors. The company is ISO 9001:2015 certified

In 2004, Extron entered the control systems marketplace. It now produces control processors, button panels, touch panels, and several software solutions. In 2010, Extron bought the products' division of Electrosonic.

In 2012 Extron opened its six-story, 200,000 square foot global headquarters building in Anaheim; including a training center, technical support and marketing offices, and a restaurant called The Ranch.

In 2014, Extron entered the lecture capture market with hardware devices for capturing video signals.
