= Anaheim GardenWalk =

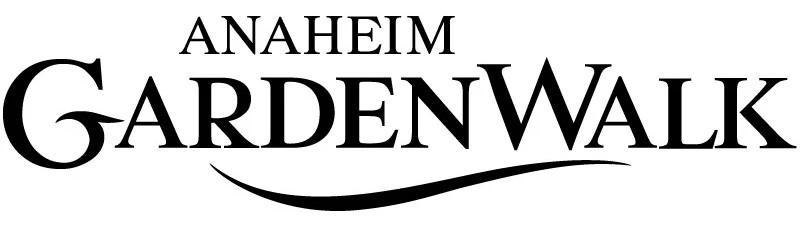

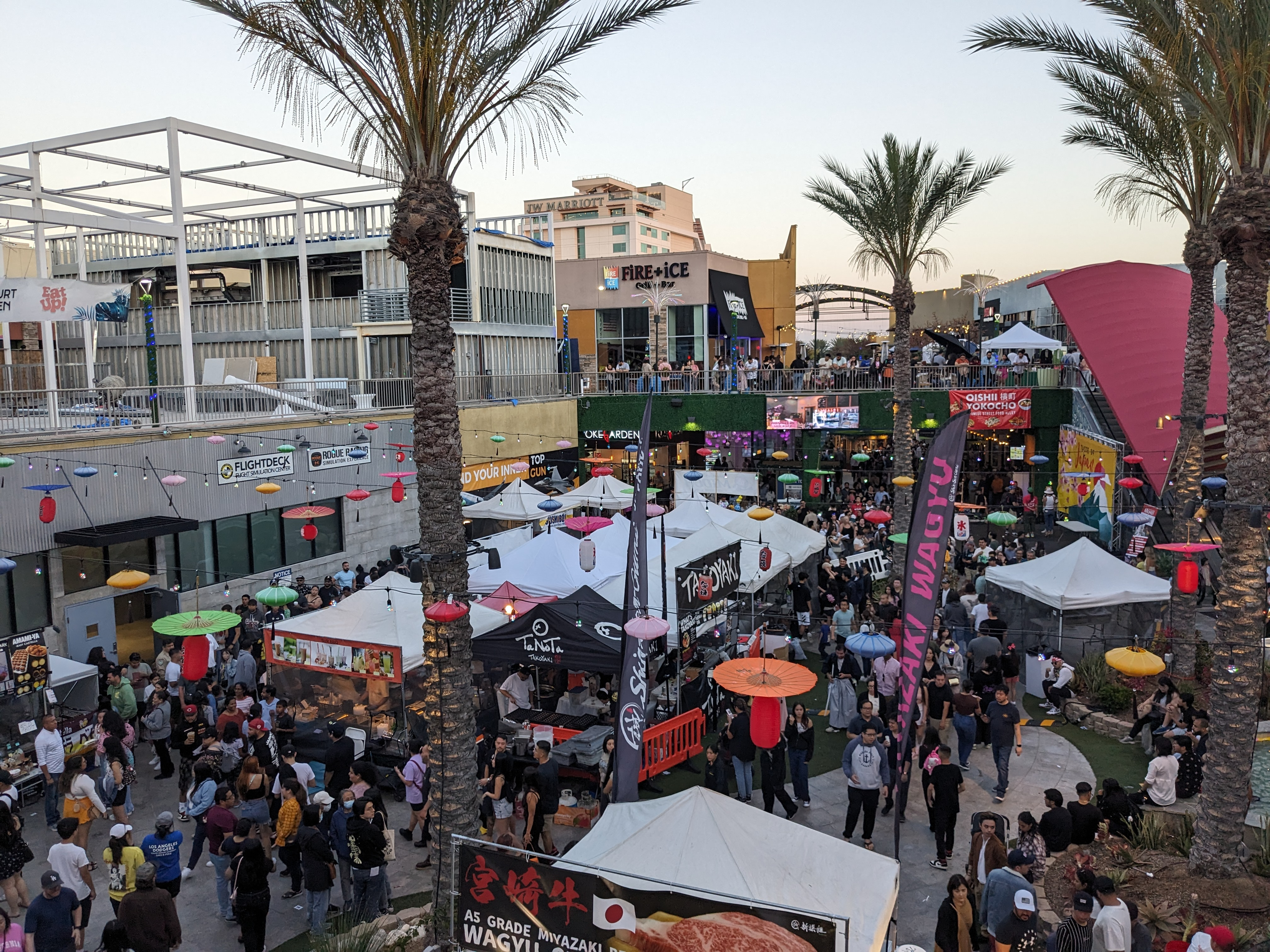
- Main courtyard of the Anaheim GardenWalk in June 2023
- Location: Anaheim, California
- Address: 321 West Katella Avenue and 400 West Disney Way
- Opened: June 14, 2008
- Developer: Avenue Capital Group
- Manager: STC Management
- Owner: STC Management
- Architect: WATG
- Floor area: 460,000 sq ft (43,000 m^{2})
- Floors: 2
- Parking: One parking garage
- Public transit: OC Bus
- Website: anaheimgardenwalk.com

Anaheim GardenWalk is a lifestyle center located a block east of the Disneyland Resort in the Anaheim Resort District of Anaheim, California. Opened in the middle of 2008 during the 2008 Great Recession, the center struggled with occupancy issues before undergoing a renaissance of success after undergoing new ownership.

Anaheim GardenWalk has the reputation as a "haven for artists" with its interchanging art murals painted or designed by local artists which allows for exposure on a larger scale.

== History ==
Although the site of the GardenWalk was zoned off for development, it would be until 2007 for work to start. The Anaheim GardenWalk opened on June 14, 2008 with a construction cost of $284 million. The mall experienced major financial troubles due to the Great Recession, with developers Citigroup Corporation defaulting on the $210 million loan taken to aid construction, and struggled with a low occupancy rate of 55% in 2011. Following a failure to recover costs of development and an inability to entice new tenants to the center, Citigroup listed and sold the GardenWalk in 2012 to Arcturus for an undisclosed amount.

A relocated, expanded House of Blues Anaheim, a major concert venue previously located at the nearby Downtown Disney from 2001 to 2016, opened at GardenWalk in March 2017, following the expiration of its lease with Disney, took over the space formerly occupied by UltraLuxe Cinemas.

In 2018, a deal was brokered between owners Arcturus and STC Management, a group of Californian and Taiwanese investors, to the tune of US$80 million to become sole owners of the property. Under new management, sustained growth post-pandemic of the center has allowed for continued development on the site to continue, with two more large-scale hotels connected to the GardenWalk property to start construction in November 2025 and open sometime in 2028. Additional proposed developments, such as a potential cat café and space pods, are under development.

== Tenants ==
Anaheim GardenWalk has a current directory featuring AMC, Bubba Gump Shrimp Company, Casa de Pancho, California Pizza Kitchen, The Cheesecake Factory, Huckleberry Breakfast and Lunch, McCormick and Schmick's, Roy's Restaurant, Paris Baguettes Starbucks, amongst others. JW Marriott, a 12-story 4-star hotel with 466 guest rooms, opened during the COVID-19 Pandemic, adjacent to the property.
