= Oak Canyon Nature Center =

Nature preserve in California, United States

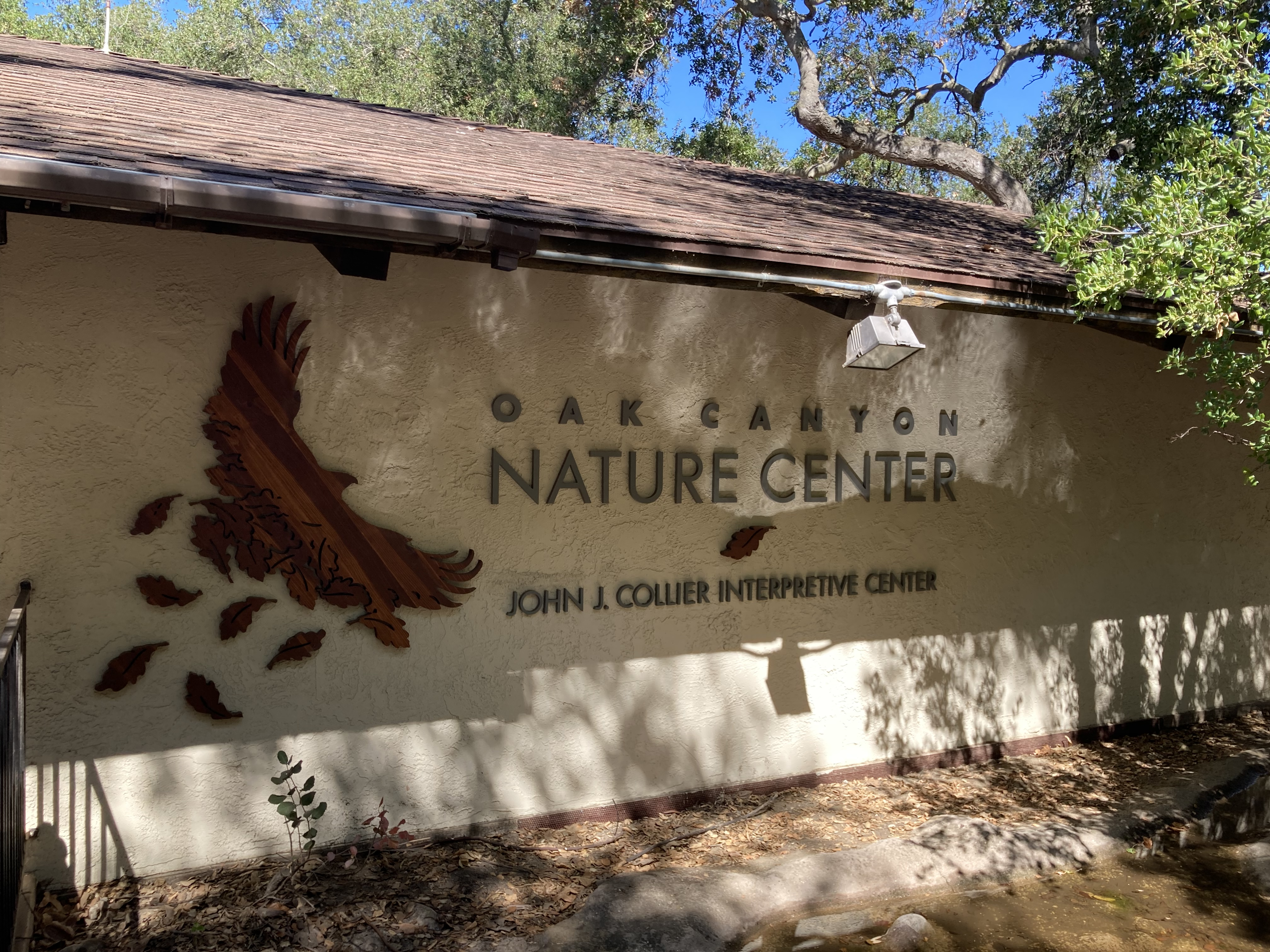
- The John J. Collier Interpretive Center
- Interactive map of Oak Canyon Nature Center
- Type: Nature center
- Location: Anaheim, California, USA
- Coordinates: 33.83742°N 117.75342°W
- Area: 58 acres (23 ha)
- Status: Open

Oak Canyon Nature Center is a nature preserve located in Anaheim, Southern California. Owned by the city, the park spans an area of 58-acres (23 hectares), comprising three adjoining canyons of the Santa Ana foothills. It has an elevation range from 525 to 825 feet (160 to 251 m)., and contains three major vegetation zones: coastal sage scrub, oak woodland and riparian. Open on weekends, the John J. Collier Interpretive Center features a museum with live animal and regional natural history exhibits.

The center offers nature education programs and summer camp programs.

== Ecology ==
=== Precipitation ===
The annual precipitation average 15 inches (38 cm) per rainfall year (July 1 to June 30) within a 20-year period between 1982 and 2002. Most of the precipitation occurs during the November–April rainy season.

=== Vegetation ===
The Oak Canyon ridge is covered in oak woodland on its northern side and coastal sage scrub habitat on its southern side. Due to the slope effect, the southern slope of the ridge is exposed to direct solar radiation. The consequent higher rate of evapotranspiration creates a dry, warm environment that favors drought-tolerant deciduous shrubs and herb. The exposed slope also favors low-growing plants with small leaves to avoid wind shear damage. Characteristic shrubs on the south slope include: California sagebrush (Artemisia californica), black sage (Salvia mellifera), and California buckwheat (Eriogonum fasciculatum).

The north-facing slope of the canyon is shaded from the Sun's direct impact. The cooler environment has enough moisture to support dense oak woodland. The most commonly encountered trees are California live oak (Quercus agrifolia), California black walnut (Juglans californica) and western poison oak (Toxicodendron diversilobum).

At the park's lower elevation, a year-round stream runs along the canyon foothill. The western sycamore (Platanus racemosa), cottonwood (Populus fremontii) and Wood duck (Aix sponsa) are restricted in range to this riparian habitat.

=== Soil characteristics ===
The soil on the southern slope consists of coarse sand and gravel. The poor water-retaining ability of this soil contributes to the dominance of drought-tolerant scrubs and pyrophyte plants. These xerophytes have shallow but extensive root network to rapidly absorb water from the soil.

The soil from the north-facing slope is covered by a thick layer of leaf litter. This organic layer allows water retention by the soil and supports the growth of larger trees species. As the result, oak and other broadleaf outcompete scrubs on the north-facing slope.

== Activities ==
Over 4 miles (6 km) of trails are available to hikers The trails range from flat to moderate incline. A typical trail is 0.3 mile (0.5 km) in length with partial shade at lower elevation and full sun along the ridge's top.
