= 2012 Anaheim, California police shooting and protests =

Protests of July 2012, in the US, that involved two fatal shootings by police officers

Anaheim killings by police and protests
- Location: Anaheim, California, U.S.
- Date: July 21, 2012
- Attack type: Shooting
- Deaths: 2
- Injuries: 6 (during protests)
- Victims: Manuel Diaz and Joel Acevedo
- Perpetrators: Nick Bennallack (shooter of Manuel Diaz); Kelly Phillips (shooter of Joel Acevedo)

The Anaheim police shootings and protests of July 2012 involve two fatal shootings by police officers in Anaheim, California, and subsequent public protests. On July 21, Manuel Diaz was shot and killed by Anaheim Police officer Nick Bennallack after he ran from the officers. Protests ensued after the shooting. On July 22, Joel Acevedo was shot and killed in an alleged exchange of gunfire with police officers, making the seventh fatal shooting involving the Anaheim Police in twelve months. Both shootings were ruled justified by the Orange County District Attorney's Office, but a federal jury later found Officer Bennallack guilty of excessive force.

== First shooting ==
On July 21, 2012, 25-year-old Manuel Diaz was shot and killed by Anaheim Police officer Nick Bennallack in Anaheim, California. According to police officials, officers were responding to a call about men congregating in an alley when they saw Diaz leaning into a car speaking to the driver. When approached, Diaz ran. The police pursued and shot him in front of a nearby apartment complex. Police stated that Diaz was known to be a gang member - but not known to Bennallack - and claimed at one point to have seen him throw an object onto a roof. The police's story changed over time, and no item was ever found. Eventually, Diaz was transported to a hospital, where he was pronounced dead around 7:00 p.m., about three hours after the shooting occurred.

== Protests and second shooting ==
After the shooting, a crowd of local residents gathered around the crime scene. According to the police, the crowd began to throw objects at the police officers. Police then fired non-lethal munitions at the crowd. At one point, a police dog attacked several individuals. Junior Lagunas, 19, suffered puncture wounds from the police dog attack. The Anaheim police chief stated that the dog accidentally got free from a police car and apologized for the attack. Witnesses at the scene told a local journalist that the police were offering to buy cell phone videos.

Further protests occurred in Anaheim, including protests at the police station and in the neighborhood where the shooting occurred.

The protests escalated the next day after police shot and killed another man, Joel Acevedo, during another foot chase, this one in the Guinida neighborhood of Anaheim. Officer Kelly Phillips, who killed Acevedo (and was previously one of the shooters of Caesar Cruz in 2009) claimed that Acevedo was shooting at him first, but Acevedo's family and witnesses claim he was unarmed and had a gun planted on him.

On July 29, two hundred protesters walked from the Anaheim police headquarters toward Disneyland. They were stopped at the intersection of Harbor Boulevard and Ball Road by a line of riot police and officers on horseback. Two reporters from the Orange County Register were injured — one was hit in the head with a rock, and the other was hit in the foot with a projectile.

== Background ==
Weekly protests outside the Anaheim Police Department had been occurring since early 2010, led by Placentia resident Theresa Smith. Smith's 35-year-old son, Caesar Cruz, was shot fatally by five Anaheim policemen on December 9, 2009. The number of participants in Smith's protests was typically small until early 2012, when she was joined by Orange County residents who had been protesting in Fullerton after the 2011 killing of Kelly Thomas, a 37-year-old homeless schizophrenic who was fatally beaten and suffocated by Fullerton policemen Manuel Ramos, Jay Cicinelli, and Joseph Wolfe.

After the March 2012 fatal shooting of Martin Hernandez, Hernandez' friends and family also joined in the weekly Anaheim protests. Tony Rackauckas, the district attorney for Fullerton, confirmed in an interview for PBS that during his term in office no police officers had been prosecuted for any of the shooting deaths that they were involved in.

The fatal shooting of Joel Acevedo on Sunday night, July 22, 2012, was the seventh fatal shooting in twelve months by officers of the Anaheim Police Department.

First, on August 16, 2011, fleeing unarmed David Raya was shot fatally, also in the Guinida neighborhood, by police investigator Bruce Linn, who was also one of the shooters of Caesar Cruz in 2009.

Second, on November 4, 2011, fleeing Marcel Ceja was shot fatally on Ball Road by Officer David Garcia; Garcia claimed that Ceja had "ditched a pistol."

Third, on January 7, 2012, Bernie "Chino" Villegas was shot fatally in the back as he sat in his parking lot shooting bottles with a B-B gun, by Officer Nick Bennallack, who would go on be charged with excessive force for killing Manuel Diaz six months later.

Fourth, on January 19, 2012, Roscoe Cambridge approached Sergeant Michael Bustamante while carrying a knife and a Bible, as Bustamante sat in his parked police car at the Anaheim Hills APD East Substation; Bustamante shot Cambridge fatally. Bustamante remained with the department until retirement.

Fifth, on March 6, 2012, Martin Hernandez was shot fatally by APD Officer Dan Hurtado after a pursuit in the Ponderosa neighborhood. This fifth fatal shooting in seven months led to 100 residents of the Ponderosa community confronting Police Chief John Welter. Anaheim Mayor Tom Tait, City Council members Lorri Galloway and Kris Murray were in attendance as residents complained angrily of police harassment and intimidation in their neighborhood.

The killings of Manuel Diaz and Joel Acevedo on July 21 and 22 were the sixth and seventh fatal APD shootings in a twelve-month period.

On July 24, Anaheim Mayor Tom Tait announced that he had arranged for the U.S. Attorney's Office to review the shootings, and that he would meet with representatives from that office, as well as with FBI agents, on Friday, July 27. Also on July 24, peaceful protests were led by Anaheim residents at Anaheim city hall at 4pm. By 6pm, the crowd started becoming unruly and Anaheim police called for riot gear and backup from surrounding cities. Many residents and police cite people from outside the city who turned the protest into a riot later in the day. Rioters were seen breaking windows of local businesses. Although there were no reports of major violence, some property damage was reported. Fifty to a hundred protesters roamed the streets, throwing rocks and bottles, causing damage to over twenty businesses, as well as the police headquarters and City Hall. A Starbucks store was attacked late in the night by a group of young men who used metal chairs and skateboards to break the windows.

The mayor of Anaheim called for outside investigations of the shooting by state and federal agencies, and the two officers involved in the shooting of Diaz were placed on paid leave. According to the Diaz family lawyer, they have not been arrested.

After Acevedo was shot by Anaheim police the day after the Diaz shooting, the city's police chief, John Welter, stated that he was "very concerned" about both the number of fatal shootings by Anaheim officers during the previous year and the controversy these shootings had caused.

== Aftermath ==
On March 21, 2013, Rackauckas' office announced no charges would be filed against Bennallack in Diaz' death.

On July 16, 2013, Rackauckas' office announced no charges would be filed against Phillips in Acevedo's death.

On March 6, 2014, a federal civil jury found the officers that killed Diaz not guilty of excessive force.

On August 24, 2016, the Ninth Circuit Court of Appeals overruled the 2014 decision, finding that the court had allowed the City of Anaheim irrelevant negative information, unknown to Bennallack at the time of the shooting, about Diaz, and ordered a new trial. The City of Anaheim appealed to the Supreme Court.

On May 2, 2017, the United States Supreme Court, in a decision with wide ramifications in all such future trials, let the Ninth Circuit's decision stand, and a new civil rights trial was scheduled for October.

And on November 2, 2017, a new federal jury determined that Bennallack did indeed use excessive force in killing Diaz, and awarded his mother $200,000 plus legal fees. Bennallack, however, remains on the Anaheim Police Force.
