= Anaheim, California =

- City
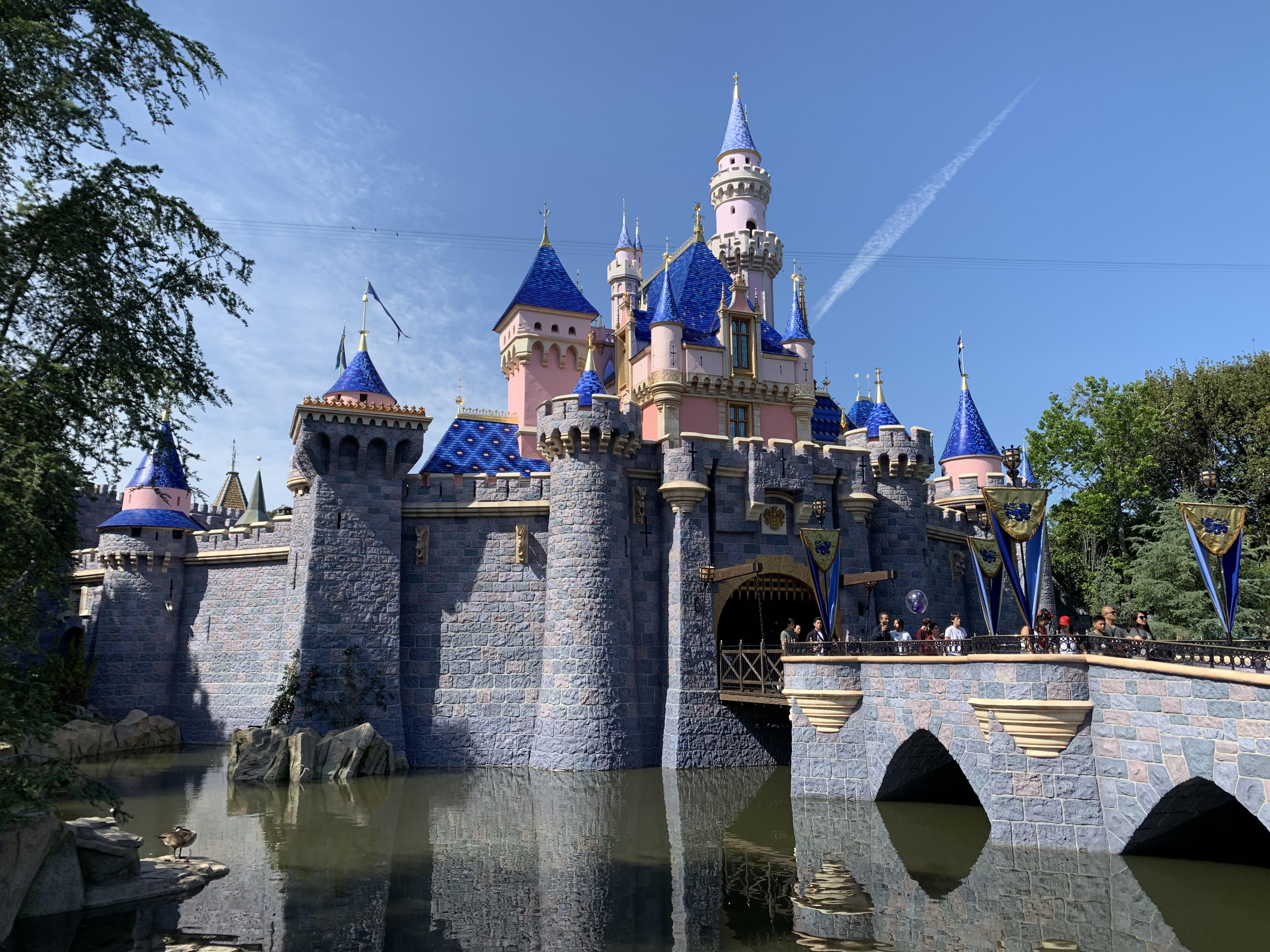
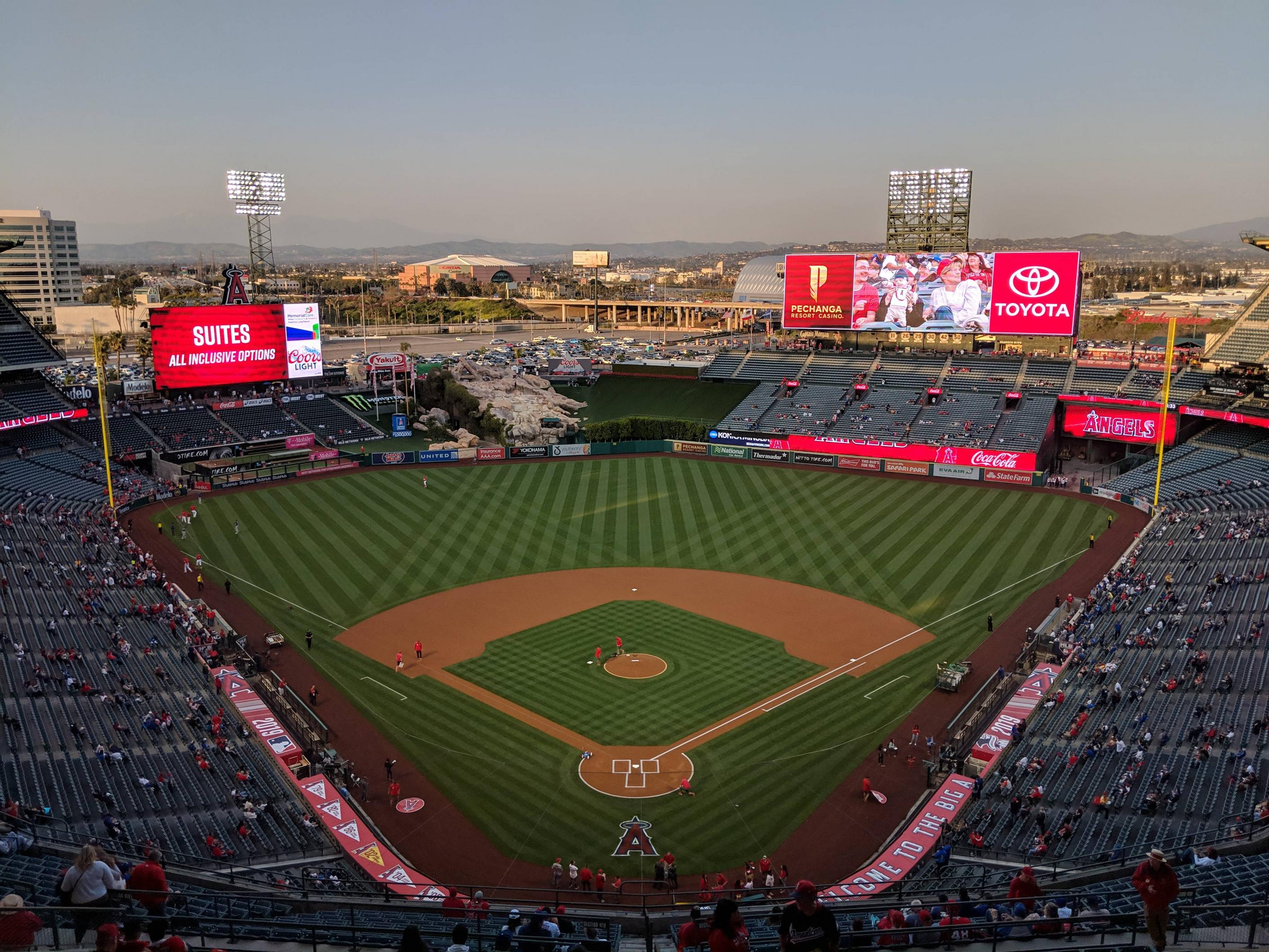
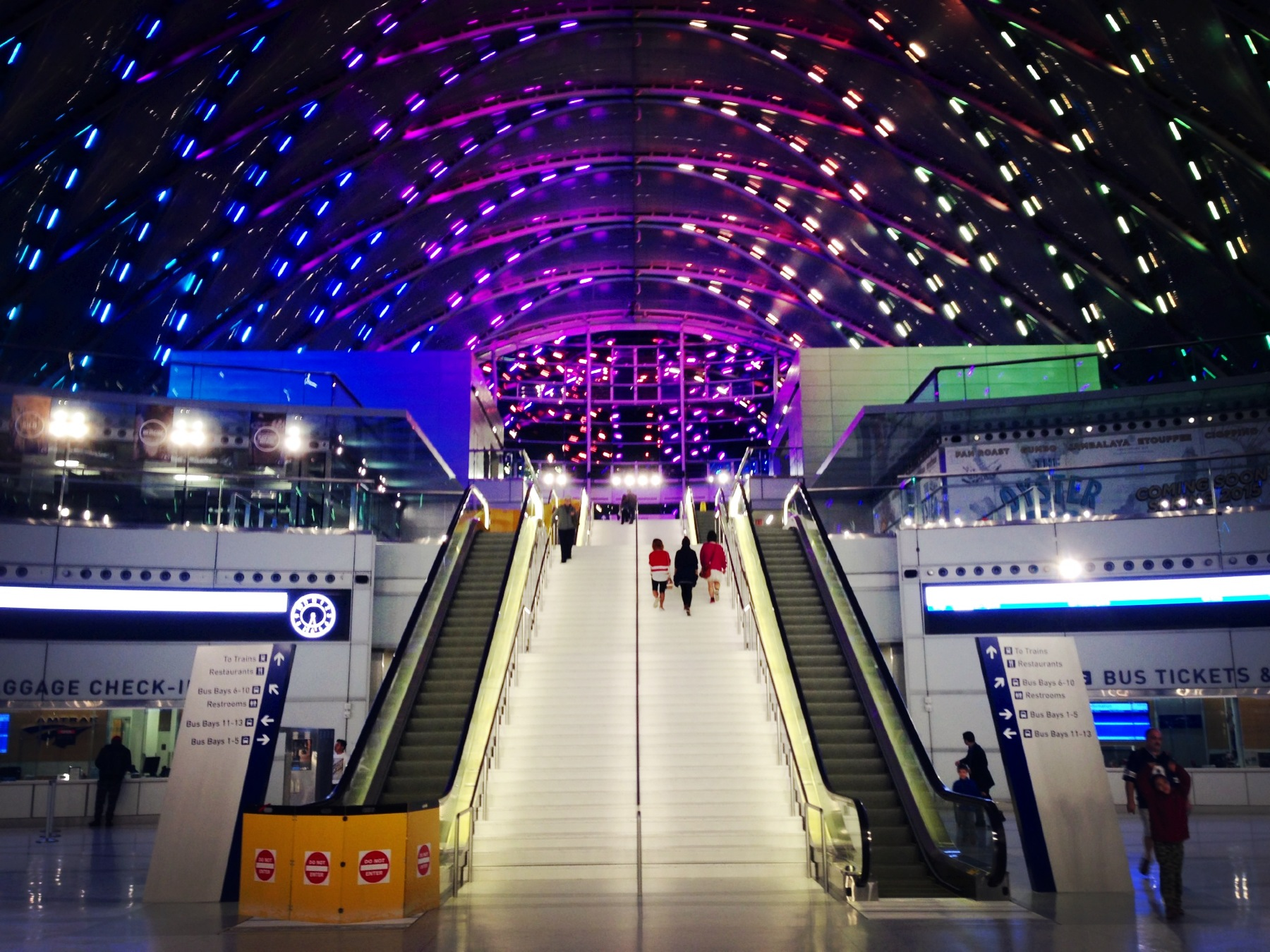
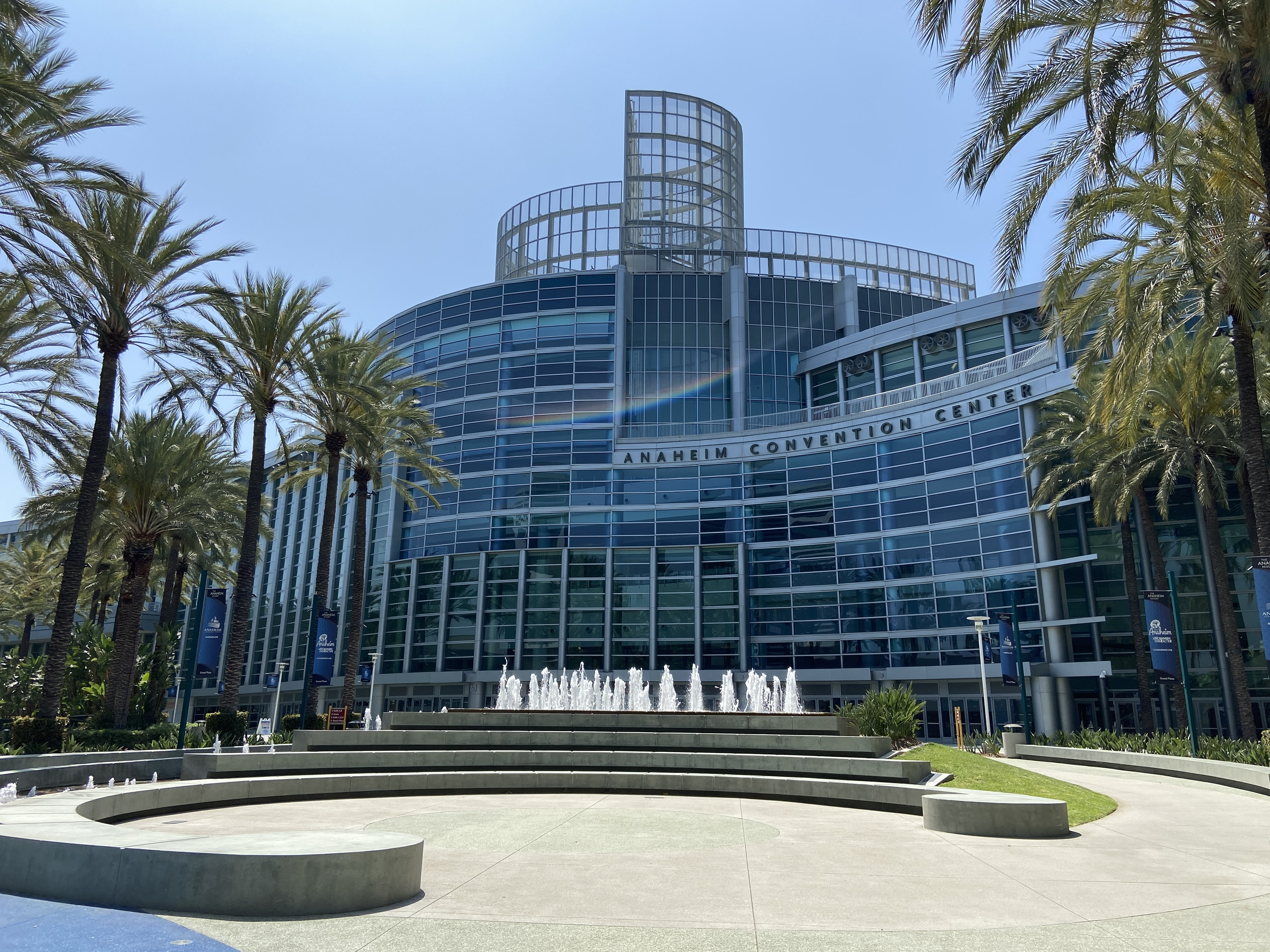
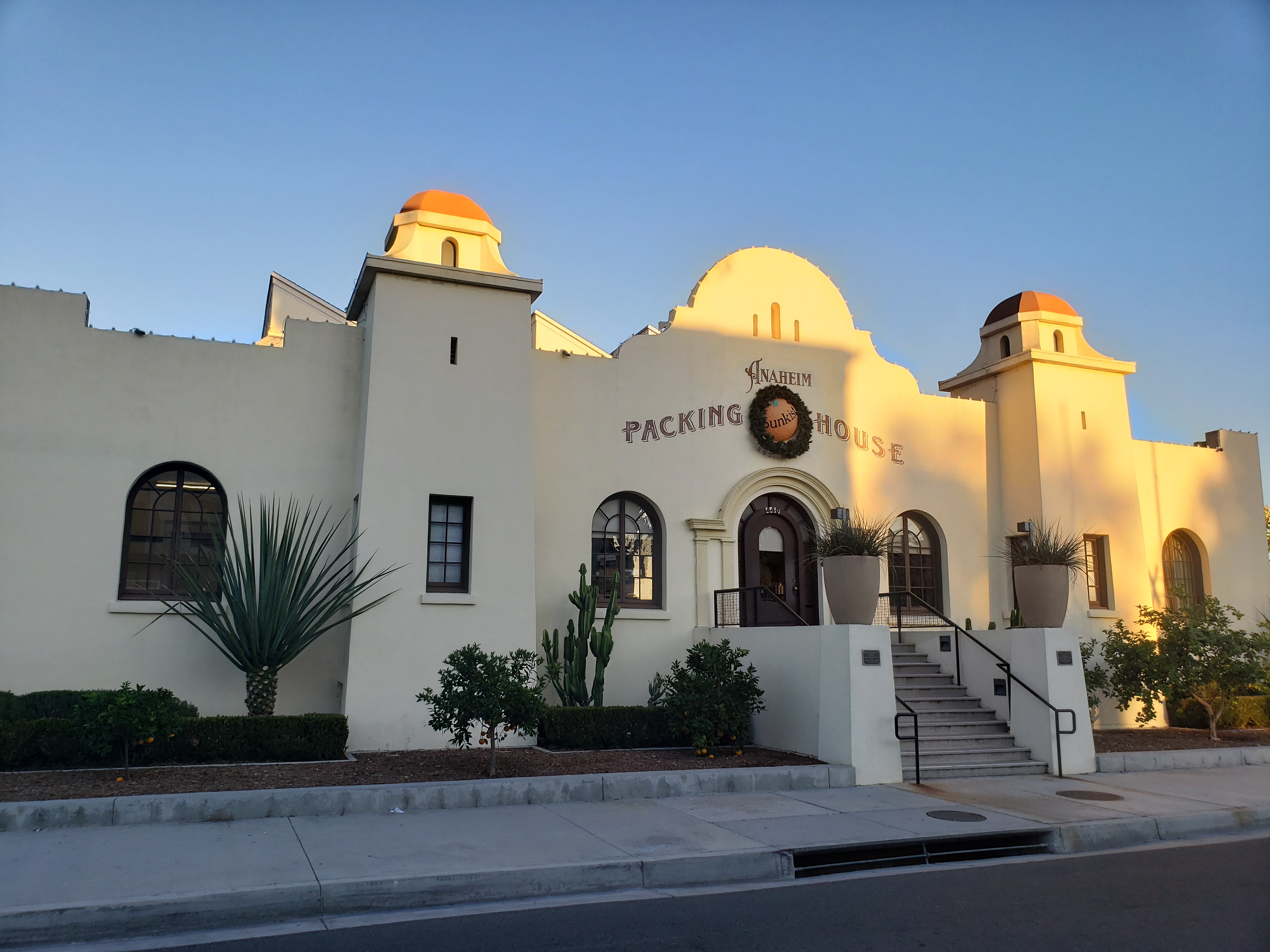
- Sleeping Beauty Castle at Disneyland Angel Stadium Anaheim Regional Transportation Intermodal Center Anaheim Convention Center Anaheim Packing House

- Flag Seal
- Etymology: "Ana", from the Santa Ana River, and from German Heim 'home'
- Nicknames: A-City
- Interactive map of Anaheim, California
- Location within California Location within the United States
- Coordinates: 33°50′10″N 117°53′23″W
- Country: United States
- State: California
- County: Orange
- Founded: 1857; 169 years ago
- Incorporated: March 18, 1876; 150 years ago
- Named for: Santa Ana River

Government
  - Type: Council–manager
  - Body: Anaheim City Council
  - Mayor: Ashleigh Aitken (D)
  - City Manager: Greg Garcia (interim)

Area
  - Total: 50.88 sq mi (131.78 km^{2})
  - Land: 50.27 sq mi (130.20 km^{2})
  - Water: 0.61 sq mi (1.58 km^{2})
- Elevation: 157 ft (48 m)

Population (2020)
  - Total: 346,824
  - Estimate (2025): 341,008 ▼
  - Rank: 1st in Orange County; 10th in California; 57th in the United States
  - Density: 6,899.2/sq mi (2,663.78/km^{2})
- Time zone: UTC−08:00 (PST)
  - Summer (DST): UTC−07:00 (PDT)
- ZIP codes: 92801–92809, 92812, 92814–92817, 92825, 92850, 92899
- Area codes: 657/714
- FIPS code: 06-02000
- GNIS feature IDs: 1652663, 2409704
- Website: anaheim.net

Anaheim (/ˈænəhaɪm/ AN-ə-hyme) is a city in northern Orange County, California, United States, part of the Greater Los Angeles area. As of the 2020 census, the city had a population of 346,824, making it the most populous city in Orange County, the tenth-most populous city in California, and the 57th-most populous city in the United States. The second largest city in Orange County in terms of land area, Anaheim is known for being the home of the Disneyland Resort, the Anaheim Convention Center, and two professional sports teams: the Los Angeles Angels of Major League Baseball (MLB) and the Anaheim Ducks of the National Hockey League (NHL). It also served as the home of the Los Angeles Rams of the National Football League (NFL) from 1980 through 1994.

Anaheim was founded by fifty German families in 1857 and incorporated as the second city in Los Angeles County on March 18, 1876; Orange County was split off from Los Angeles County in 1889. Anaheim remained largely an agricultural community until Disneyland opened on July 17, 1955. This led to the construction of several hotels and motels around the area, and residential districts in Anaheim soon followed. The city also developed into an industrial center, producing electronics, aircraft parts and canned fruit. Anaheim is a charter city.

Anaheim's city limits extend almost the full width of Orange County, from Cypress in the west, twenty miles east to the Riverside County line, encompassing a diverse range of neighborhoods. In the west, mid-20th-century tract houses predominate. Downtown Anaheim has three mixed-use historic districts, the largest of which is the Anaheim Colony. South of downtown, a center of commercial activity of regional importance begins, the Anaheim–Santa Ana edge city, which stretches east and south into the cities of Orange, Santa Ana, and Garden Grove. This edge city includes the Disneyland Resort, with two theme parks, multiple hotels, and its retail district; Disney is part of the larger Anaheim Resort district with numerous other hotels and retail complexes. The Platinum Triangle, a neo-urban redevelopment district surrounding Angel Stadium, is planned to be populated with mixed-use streets and high-rises. Further east, Anaheim Canyon is an industrial district north of the Riverside Freeway (SR 91) and east of the Orange Freeway (SR 57). The city's eastern third consists of Anaheim Hills, a community built to a master plan, and open land east of the Eastern Transportation Corridor (SR 241 toll road).

== Toponymy ==
Anaheim's name is a blend of Ana, after the nearby Santa Ana River, and German -heim meaning "home", which is also a common Germanic place name compound (compare Trondheim in Norway and many place names in Germany).

== History ==
=== Tongva era ===
Tongva people are indigenous to Anaheim's region of Southern California. Evidence suggests their presence since 3500 BCE. The Tongva village at Anaheim was called Hutuukuga. The village has been noted as one of the largest Tongva villages throughout Tovaangar. Native plants like oak trees and sage bushes were an important food source, as well as rabbit and mule deer for meat. The village had deep trade connections with coastal villages and those further inland.

=== Spanish and Mexican era ===
The area that makes up modern-day Anaheim, along with Placentia and Fullerton, were part of the Rancho San Juan Cajón de Santa Ana, a Mexican-era rancho grant, given to Juan Pacífico Ontiveros in 1837 by Juan Bautista Alvarado, then Governor of Alta California. Following the American Conquest of California, the rancho was patented to Ontiveros by Public Land Commission. In 1857, Ontiveros sold 1,160 acres (out of his more than 35,000 acre estate) to 50 German-American families for the founding of Anaheim.

=== Founding ===
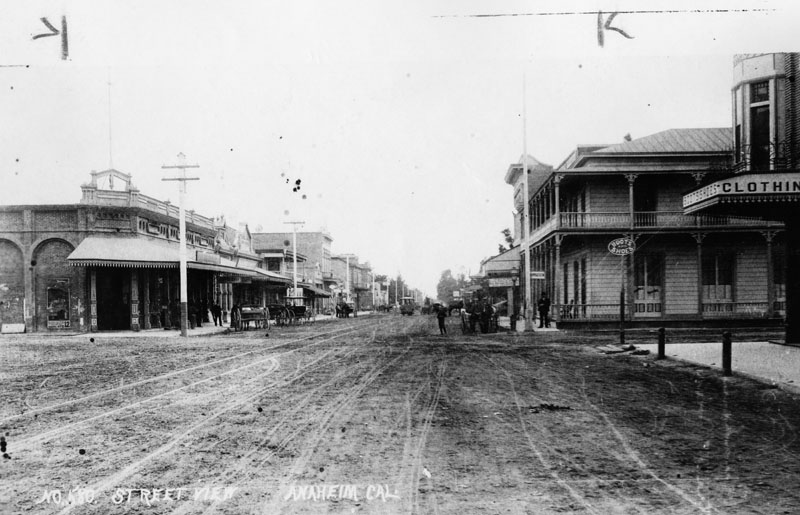
Anaheim in 1890

The city of Anaheim was founded in 1857 by 50 German-Americans who were residents of San Francisco and whose families had originated in Rothenburg ob der Tauber, Franconia in Bavaria. After traveling through the state looking for a suitable area to grow grapes, the group decided to purchase a 1,165 acres (4.71 km^{2}) parcel from Juan Pacífico Ontiveros' large Rancho San Juan Cajón de Santa Ana in present-day Orange County for $2 per acre. It's recorded as the oldest American founded city in Orange County.

For $750 a share, the group formed the Anaheim Vineyard Company headed by George Hansen. Their new community was named Annaheim, meaning "home by the Santa Ana River" in German. The name later was altered to Anaheim. To the Spanish-speaking neighbors, the settlement was known as Campo Alemán (English: German Field).

Although grape and wine-making was their primary objective, the majority of the 50 settlers were mechanics, carpenters and craftsmen with no experience in wine-making. The community set aside 40 acres (16 ha) for a town center and a school was the first building erected there. The first home was built in 1857, the Anaheim Gazette newspaper was established in 1870 and a hotel in 1871. The census of 1870 reported a population of 565 for the Anaheim district. For 25 years, the area was the largest wine producer in California. However, in 1884, a disease infected the grape vines and by the following year the entire industry was destroyed. Other crops – walnuts, lemons and oranges – soon filled the void. Fruits and vegetables had become viable cash crops when the Los Angeles – Orange County region was connected to the continental railroad network in 1887.

==== Anaheim's Chinatown ====
German settlers traveled to San Francisco to recruit thirty Chinese laborers. Each Chinese laborer was compensated with a town lot, and these parcels later formed the spatial foundation of Anaheim’s early Chinatown.

Over time, Anaheim’s Chinese population grew to become the second-largest ethnic group in the city, after the German community. Chinese immigrants planted hundreds of thousands of grapevines, excavated the sixteen-mile Cajon Canal from the Anaheim Union Reservoir (now located within Tri-City Regional Park in Placentia), constructed some of Orange County’s earliest railroads, and worked extensively in the region’s agricultural fields. Several Chinese physicians provided medical care within Anaheim’s Chinatown, while others operated vegetable businesses and laundries, contributing to the city’s early economic and social development.

Despite these contributions, Anaheim’s Chinese community began to decline following the implementation of the Chinese Exclusion Act of 1882. This decline was further accelerated by anti-Chinese violence in Orange County and racially motivated boycotts of Chinese-owned businesses. After 1910, Chinese residents gradually left the area, and by 1935, only one Chinese resident remained in Anaheim.

=== Helena Modjeska ===
Polish actress Helena Modjeska settled in Anaheim with her husband and various friends, among them Henryk Sienkiewicz, Julian Sypniewski and Łucjan Paprocki. While living in Anaheim, Helena Modjeska became good friends with Clementine Langenberger, the second wife of August Langenberger. Helena Street and Clementine Street are named after these two ladies, and the streets are located adjacent to each other as a symbol of the strong friendship which Helena Modjeska and Clementine Lagenberger shared. Modjeska Park in West Anaheim, is also named after Helena Modjeska.

=== Early 20th century ===
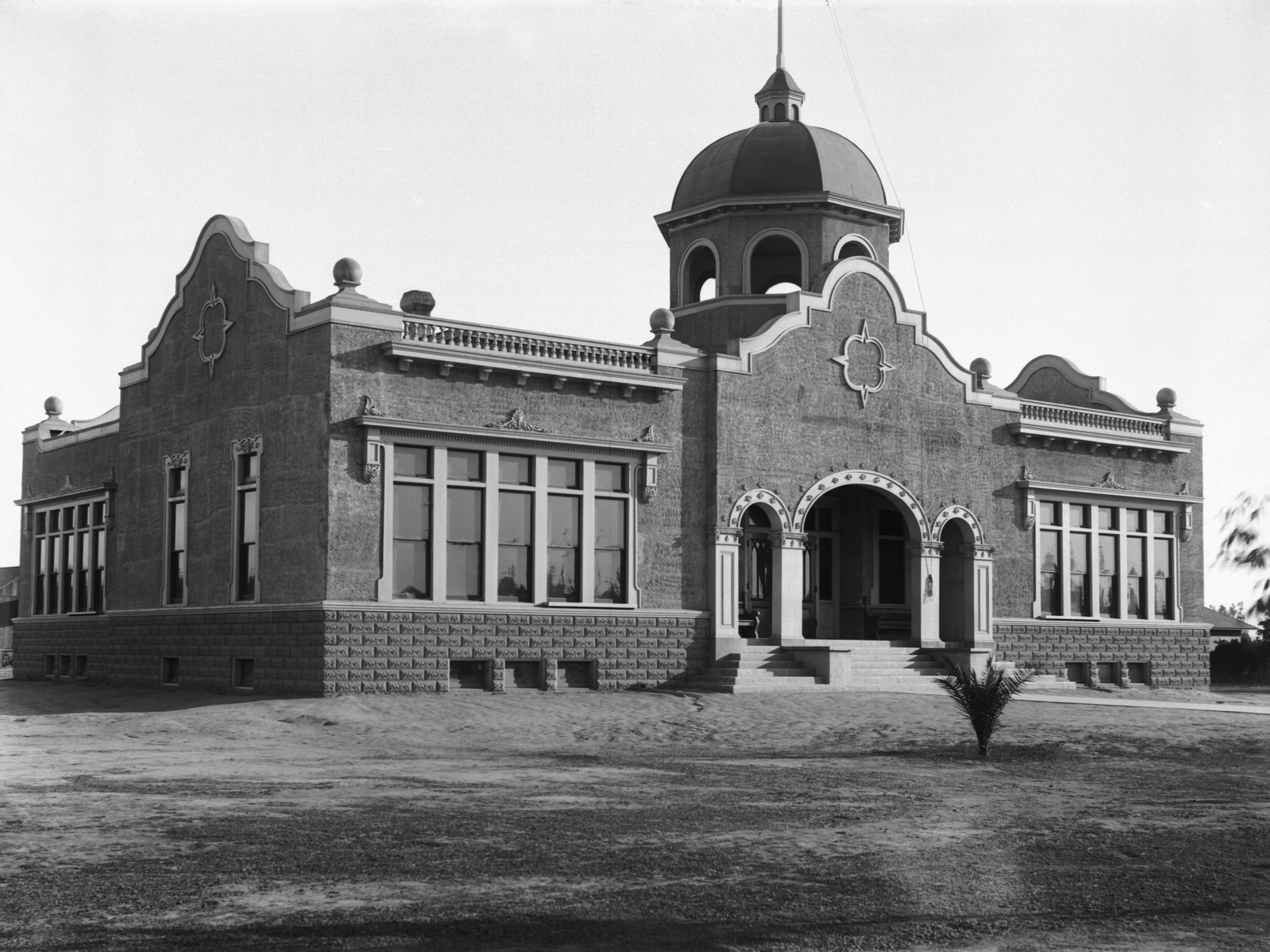
Anaheim High School, c. 1900

During the first half of the 20th century, Anaheim was a massive rural community dominated by orange groves and the landowners who farmed them. One of the landowners was Bennett Payne Baxter, who owned much land in northeast Anaheim that today is the location of Angel Stadium. He came up with many new ideas for irrigating orange groves and shared his ideas with other landowners. He was not only successful, he helped other landowners and businesspeople succeed as well. Ben Baxter and other landowners helped to make Anaheim a thriving rural community before the opening of Disneyland transformed the city. A street along Edison Park is named Baxter Street. Also during this time, Rudolph Boysen served as Anaheim's first Park Superintendent from 1921 to 1950. Boysen created a hybrid berry which Walter Knott later named the boysenberry, after Rudy Boysen. Boysen Park in East Anaheim was also named after him.

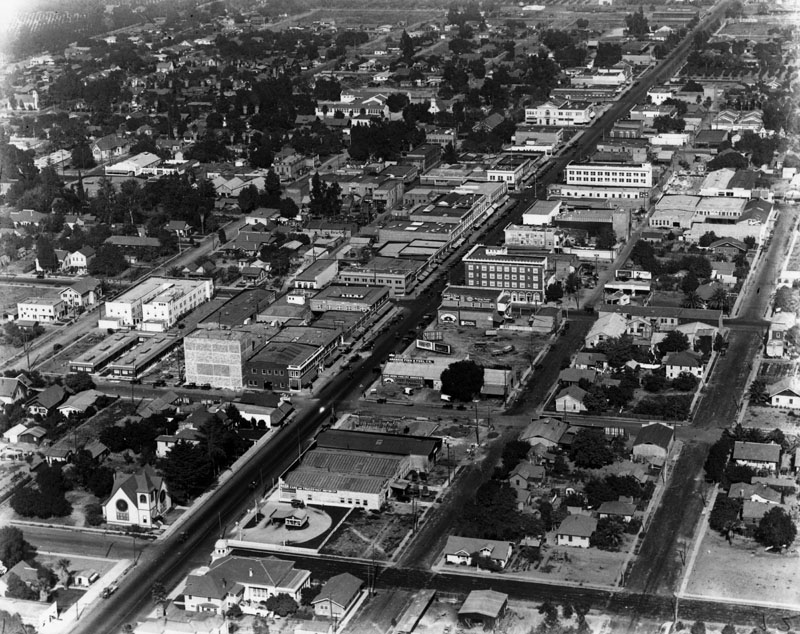
Anaheim in 1922

In 1924, Ku Klux Klan members were elected to the Anaheim City Council on a platform of political reform. Up until that point, the city had been controlled by a long-standing business and civic elite that was mostly German American. Given their tradition of moderate social drinking, the German Americans did not strongly support prohibition laws of the day. The mayor himself was a former saloon keeper. Led by the minister of the First Christian Church, the Klan represented a rising group of politically oriented non-ethnic Germans who denounced the elite as corrupt, undemocratic, and self-serving. The Klansmen aimed to create what they saw as a model, orderly community, one in which prohibition against alcohol would be strictly enforced. At the time, the KKK had about 1,200 members in Orange County. The economic and occupational profile of the pro and anti-Klan groups shows the two were similar and about equally prosperous. Klan members were Protestants, as were the majority of their opponents; however, the opposition to the Klan also included many Catholic Germans. Individuals who joined the Klan had earlier demonstrated a much higher rate of voting and civic activism than did their opponents, and many of the individuals in Orange County who joined the Klan did so out of a sense of civic activism. Upon easily winning the local Anaheim election in April 1924, the Klan representatives promptly fired city employees who were known to be Catholic and replaced them with Klan appointees. The new city council tried to enforce prohibition. After its victory, the Klan chapter held large rallies and initiation ceremonies over the summer.

The opposition to the KKK's hold on Anaheim politics organized, bribed a Klansman for their secret membership list, and exposed the Klansmen running in the state primaries, defeating most of the candidates. In 1925, Klan opponents took back local government, and succeeded in a special election in recalling the Klansmen who had been elected in April 1924. The Klan in Anaheim quickly collapsed; its newspaper closed after losing a libel suit, and the minister who led the local Klavern moved to Kansas.

=== Mid to late 20th century ===
Facilitation of new industries and suburban residents was possible due to the expansion of highways out of Los Angeles. Population dispersal efforts were made by the California's Division of Highways in order to subvert an easily targeted population cluster for atomic threats in the aftermath of World War II.

=== Fricker Fertilizer Factory Fire ===
The Fricker Fertilizer Factory fire on June 21, 1985 has been considered to be one of the worst environmental disasters in Orange County. A pesticide warehouse under the Larry Fricker Company was set ablaze, burning for four days due to the hazardous, highly toxic chemicals, such as methyl bromide gas and organophosphates, that were stored inside. The fire released more than 80 different chemicals into the air, which were carried by winds to surrounding neighborhoods.

The first round of evacuations took place 14 hours after the fire was reported and witnesses claimed that the air appeared "thick" and exposed skin began to intensely itch. Working-class neighborhoods within a 2-mile radius in the cities of Fullerton, Anaheim, and Placentia were evacuated, resulting in a conservative estimate more than 7,500 evacuees and the closure of the 57 freeway for two days.

Cleanup operations are recorded to have removed four tons of ammonium nitrate in order to avoid additional explosions. Twenty cases of hospitalization were linked to the toxic fumes emitted by the factory fire and lingering effects in the population included burning lungs, itching skin, boils, and rashes.

The $100-million class action lawsuit against the Fricker Company of Anaheim had been dropped a year later in exchange for several, smaller lawsuits as well as legal reform that mandated businesses in California report the type, quantity, and location of toxic chemicals on the premises.

=== Disneyland and the Anaheim Resort ===
Construction of the Disneyland theme park began on July 16, 1954, and it opened to the public on July 17, 1955. It has become one of the world's most visited tourist attractions, with over 650 million visitors since its opening. The location was formerly 160 acres (0.65 km^{2}) of orange and walnut trees. The opening of Disneyland created a tourism boom in the Anaheim area. Walt Disney had originally intended to purchase additional land to build accommodations for Disneyland visitors; however, the park's construction drained his financial resources and he was unable to acquire more land. Entrepreneurs eager to capitalize on Disney's success moved in and built hotels, restaurants, and shops around Disneyland and eventually boxed in the Disney property, and turned the area surrounding Disneyland into the boulevards of colorful neon signs that Walt Disney had tried to avoid. The city of Anaheim, eager for tax revenue these hotels would generate, did little to obstruct their construction.

By the mid-1960s, the city's explosive growth would attract a Major League Baseball team, with the California Angels relocating from Los Angeles to Anaheim in 1966, where they have remained since. In 1980, the National Football League's Los Angeles Rams relocated from the Los Angeles Memorial Coliseum to the Angels' home field, Anaheim Stadium, playing there until their relocation to St. Louis in 1995. In 1993, Anaheim gained its own National Hockey League team when The Walt Disney Company founded the Mighty Ducks of Anaheim.

In the 1990s, while Disneyland was undergoing a significant expansion project surrounding the construction of Disney California Adventure Park, the city of Anaheim rebranded the surrounding area as the Anaheim Resort. The Anaheim Resort district is roughly bounded by the Santa Ana River to the east, Ball Road to the north, Walnut Street to the west, and the Garden Grove city limits to the south at Chapman Avenue, and Orangewood Avenue to the southwest. Attractions within the Resort District include the Disneyland Resort, the Anaheim Convention Center, the Honda Center, Anaheim/Orange County Walk of Stars, and Angel Stadium of Anaheim.

Part of the project included removing the colorful neon signs and replacing them with shorter, more modest signs, as well as widening the arterial streets in the area into tree-lined boulevards. Further expansion included the purchase of the Fujishige Strawberry Farm in 1998 which sold for just under $100 million to Disney after nearly half a decade of financial proposals to the former owners. Today the former farm features a Hilton Hotel and is the site of the 'Toy Story' parking lot.

=== 21st century ===
In 2001, Disney's California Adventure (renamed Disney California Adventure Park in 2010), the most expansive project in Disneyland's history, opened to the public. In 2007, Anaheim celebrated its sesquicentennial.

In July 2012, political protests by Hispanic residents occurred following the fatal shooting of two men, the first of whom was unarmed. Protesting occurred in the area between State College and East Street, and was motivated by concerns over police brutality, gang activity, domination of the city by commercial interests, and a perceived lack of political representation of Hispanic residents in the city government. The protests were accompanied by looting of businesses and homes.

== Geography ==
Anaheim is approximately 25 miles (40 km) southeast of downtown Los Angeles. The city roughly follows the east-to-west route of the 91 Freeway from the Orange-Riverside county border to Buena Park.

=== Cityscape ===
The city recognizes several districts, including the Anaheim Resort (the area surrounding Disneyland), Anaheim Canyon (an industrial area north of California State Route 91 and east of California State Route 57), and the Platinum Triangle (the area surrounding Angel Stadium). Anaheim Hills also maintains a distinct identity. The contiguous commercial development from the Disney Resort through into the cities of Orange, Garden Grove and Santa Ana has collectively been termed the Anaheim–Santa Ana edge city.

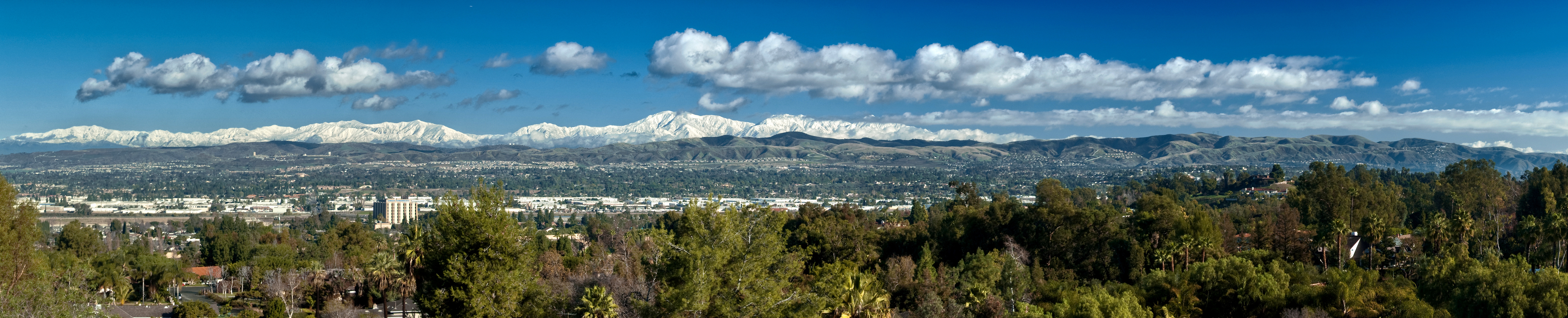
Panorama of part of East Anaheim in the Santa Ana Canyon

=== Climate ===
Anaheim, California

Climate chart (precipitation, max. and min. temperature)
| J | F | M | A | M | J | J | A | S | O | N | D |
| 3.3 71 49 | 3.5 71 49 | 1.9 74 51 | 0.8 77 53 | 0.5 78 58 | 0.2 82 62 | 0.1 87 66 | 0.1 89 66 | 0.1 88 64 | 0.7 83 59 | 1 77 53 | 2 71 48 |
- █ Average max. and min. temperatures in °F
- █ Precipitation totals in inches
Metric conversion
| J | F | M | A | M | J | J | A | S | O | N | D |
| 84 22 9 | 89 22 9 | 48 23 11 | 20 25 12 | 13 26 14 | 5.1 28 17 | 2.5 31 19 | 2.5 32 19 | 2.5 31 18 | 18 28 15 | 25 25 12 | 51 22 9 |
- █ Average max. and min. temperatures in °C
- █ Precipitation totals in mm

Like many other South Coast cities, Anaheim maintains a borderline hot semi-arid climate (Köppen BSh), a little short of a Mediterranean climate (Köppen Csa) characterized by warm winters with erratic heavy rainfalls, and hot, essentially rainless summers. The record high temperature in Anaheim is 115 °F (46 °C) on July 6, 2018 and the record low temperature is 30 °F (−1 °C) on February 15, 1990, and January 30, 2002.

Climate data for Anaheim, California (1991–2020 normals, extremes 1989–present)
| Month | Jan | Feb | Mar | Apr | May | Jun | Jul | Aug | Sep | Oct | Nov | Dec | Year |
|---|---|---|---|---|---|---|---|---|---|---|---|---|---|
| Record high °F (°C) | 95 (35) | 97 (36) | 98 (37) | 106 (41) | 106 (41) | 106 (41) | 115 (46) | 105 (41) | 112 (44) | 107 (42) | 102 (39) | 91 (33) | 115 (46) |
| Mean maximum °F (°C) | 84.5 (29.2) | 85.3 (29.6) | 88.0 (31.1) | 92.4 (33.6) | 91.7 (33.2) | 92.9 (33.8) | 96.0 (35.6) | 98.3 (36.8) | 101.6 (38.7) | 98.1 (36.7) | 91.1 (32.8) | 82.4 (28.0) | 103.6 (39.8) |
| Mean daily maximum °F (°C) | 71.0 (21.7) | 71.0 (21.7) | 73.7 (23.2) | 76.6 (24.8) | 78.0 (25.6) | 81.7 (27.6) | 86.8 (30.4) | 88.8 (31.6) | 87.8 (31.0) | 83.4 (28.6) | 76.8 (24.9) | 70.6 (21.4) | 78.8 (26.0) |
| Daily mean °F (°C) | 59.9 (15.5) | 60.2 (15.7) | 62.6 (17.0) | 65.3 (18.5) | 68.1 (20.1) | 71.7 (22.1) | 76.2 (24.6) | 77.4 (25.2) | 75.9 (24.4) | 71.3 (21.8) | 64.9 (18.3) | 59.4 (15.2) | 67.7 (19.8) |
| Mean daily minimum °F (°C) | 48.9 (9.4) | 49.3 (9.6) | 51.4 (10.8) | 52.8 (11.6) | 58.2 (14.6) | 61.7 (16.5) | 65.6 (18.7) | 66.0 (18.9) | 64.1 (17.8) | 59.3 (15.2) | 53.0 (11.7) | 48.2 (9.0) | 56.5 (13.6) |
| Mean minimum °F (°C) | 39.0 (3.9) | 39.7 (4.3) | 42.2 (5.7) | 45.9 (7.7) | 51.1 (10.6) | 55.4 (13.0) | 59.4 (15.2) | 59.8 (15.4) | 56.7 (13.7) | 50.8 (10.4) | 43.4 (6.3) | 38.0 (3.3) | 36.3 (2.4) |
| Record low °F (°C) | 30 (−1) | 30 (−1) | 37 (3) | 38 (3) | 45 (7) | 50 (10) | 54 (12) | 52 (11) | 51 (11) | 44 (7) | 33 (1) | 32 (0) | 30 (−1) |
| Average rainfall inches (mm) | 3.34 (85) | 3.47 (88) | 1.86 (47) | 0.83 (21) | 0.53 (13) | 0.15 (3.8) | 0.07 (1.8) | 0.01 (0.25) | 0.10 (2.5) | 0.72 (18) | 0.99 (25) | 2.02 (51) | 14.09 (356.35) |
| Average rainy days (≥ 0.01 in) | 6.1 | 6.3 | 4.9 | 2.7 | 1.8 | 0.8 | 0.8 | 0.1 | 0.7 | 2.1 | 2.7 | 5.7 | 34.7 |
Source: NOAA

== Demographics ==
Historical population
| Census | Pop. | Note | %± |
|---|---|---|---|
| 1870 | 881 | | — |
| 1880 | 833 | | −5.4% |
| 1890 | 1,273 | | 52.8% |
| 1900 | 1,456 | | 14.4% |
| 1910 | 2,628 | | 80.5% |
| 1920 | 5,526 | | 110.3% |
| 1930 | 10,995 | | 99.0% |
| 1940 | 11,031 | | 0.3% |
| 1950 | 14,556 | | 32.0% |
| 1960 | 104,184 | | 615.7% |
| 1970 | 166,408 | | 59.7% |
| 1980 | 219,494 | | 31.9% |
| 1990 | 266,406 | | 21.4% |
| 2000 | 328,014 | | 23.1% |
| 2010 | 336,265 | | 2.5% |
| 2020 | 346,824 | | 3.1% |
| 2025 (est.) | 341,008 | ▼ | −1.7% |
U.S. Decennial Census; 1850–1870 1880–1890; 1900 1910 1920; 1930 1940 1950; 1960 1970 1980; 1990 2000 2010

Anaheim first appeared as a city in Los Angeles County in the 1870 U.S. census; and then as part of the newly formed Orange County in the 1900 U.S. census.

Anaheim city, California – Racial and ethnic composition Note: the US Census treats Hispanic/Latino as an ethnic category. This table excludes Latinos from the racial categories and assigns them to a separate category. Hispanics/Latinos may be of any race.
| Race / Ethnicity (NH = Non-Hispanic) | Pop 1980 | Pop 1990 | Pop 2000 | Pop 2010 | Pop 2020 | % 1980 | % 1990 | % 2000 | % 2010 | % 2020 |
|---|---|---|---|---|---|---|---|---|---|---|
| White alone (NH) | 167,658 | 150,874 | 117,607 | 92,362 | 78,237 | 76.45% | 56.63% | 35.85% | 27.47% | 22.56% |
| Black or African American alone (NH) | 2,593 | 6,302 | 7,939 | 8,209 | 8,465 | 1.18% | 2.37% | 2.42% | 2.44% | 2.44% |
| Native American or Alaska Native alone (NH) | 1,971 | 996 | 1,049 | 743 | 646 | 0.90% | 0.37% | 0.32% | 0.22% | 0.19% |
| Asian alone (NH) | 8,910 | 24,083 | 38,919 | 49,210 | 60,632 | 4.06% | 9.04% | 11.87% | 14.63% | 17.48% |
| Native Hawaiian or Pacific Islander alone (NH) | 8,910 | 24,083 | 1,263 | 1,437 | 1,297 | 4.06% | 9.04% | 0.39% | 0.43% | 0.37% |
| Other race alone (NH) | 588 | 396 | 457 | 628 | 1,485 | 0.27% | 0.15% | 0.14% | 0.19% | 0.43% |
| Mixed race or Multiracial (NH) | x | x | 7,406 | 6,209 | 9,411 | x | x | 2.26% | 1.85% | 2.71% |
| Hispanic or Latino (any race) | 37,591 | 83,755 | 153,374 | 177,467 | 186,651 | 17.14% | 31.44% | 46.76% | 52.78% | 53.82% |
| Total | 219,311 | 266,406 | 328,014 | 336,467 | 346,824 | 100.00% | 100.00% | 100.00% | 100.00% | 100.00% |

=== 2020 ===
The 2020 United States census reported that Anaheim had a population of 346,824. The population density was 6,898.8 inhabitants per square mile (2,663.6/km^{2}). The racial makeup of Anaheim was 31.1% White, 2.7% African American, 1.8% Native American, 17.7% Asian, 0.4% Pacific Islander, 29.3% from other races, and 17.0% from two or more races. Hispanic or Latino residents of any race were 53.8% of the population.

The census reported that 98.6% of the population lived in households, 1.0% lived in non-institutionalized group quarters, and 0.4% were institutionalized.

There were 105,740 households, out of which 37.6% included children under the age of 18, 49.6% were married-couple households, 7.6% were cohabiting couple households, 25.7% had a female householder with no partner present, and 17.0% had a male householder with no partner present. 18.2% of households were one person, and 7.5% were one person aged 65 or older. The average household size was 3.23. There were 78,716 families (74.4% of all households).

The age distribution was 22.6% under the age of 18, 10.5% aged 18 to 24, 29.4% aged 25 to 44, 24.8% aged 45 to 64, and 12.7% who were 65 years of age or older. The median age was 35.6 years. For every 100 females, there were 97.3 males.

There were 110,388 housing units at an average density of 2,195.8 units per square mile (847.8 units/km^{2}), of which 105,740 (95.8%) were occupied. Of these, 45.1% were owner-occupied, and 54.9% were occupied by renters.

In 2023, the US Census Bureau estimated that 35.2% of the population was foreign-born. Of all people aged 5 or older, 39.8% spoke only English at home, 41.2% spoke Spanish, 4.1% spoke other Indo-European languages, 12.9% spoke Asian or Pacific Islander languages, and 2.0% spoke other languages. Of those aged 25 or older, 77.5% were high school graduates and 28.8% had a bachelor's degree.

The median household income in 2023 was $90,583, and the per capita income was $36,541. About 9.3% of families and 12.5% of the population were below the poverty line.

=== 2010 ===
The 2010 United States census reported that Anaheim had a population of 336,265. The population density was 6,618.0 inhabitants per square mile (2,555.2/km^{2}). The racial makeup of Anaheim was:

- 177,237 (52.7%) White (27.5% non-Hispanic White alone),
- 80,705 (24.0%) from other races
- 49,857 (14.8%) Asian (4.4% Vietnamese, 3.6% Filipino, 2.0% Korean, 1.4% Chinese, 1.3% Indian)
- 1,607 (0.5%) Pacific Islander
- 14,864 (4.4%) from two or more races (multiracial/mestizo)
- 9,347 (2.8%) African American
- 2,648 (0.8%) Native American

There were 177,467 Hispanic or Latino residents, of any race (52.8%); 46.0% of Anaheim's population was of Mexican descent, 1.2% Salvadoran, and 1.0% Guatemalan; the remainder of the Hispanic population came from smaller ancestral groups.

The census reported that 332,708 people (98.9% of the population) lived in households, 2,020 (0.6%) lived in non-institutionalized group quarters, and 1,537 (0.5%) were institutionalized.

There were 98,294 households, out of which 44,045 (44.8%) had children under the age of 18 living in them, 52,518 (53.4%) were opposite-sex married couples living together, 14,553 (14.8%) had a female householder with no husband present, 7,223 (7.3%) had a male householder with no wife present. There were 6,173 (6.3%) unmarried opposite-sex partnerships, and 733 (0.7%) same-sex married couples or partnerships. 17,448 households (17.8%) were made up of individuals, and 6,396 (6.5%) had someone living alone who was 65 years of age or older. The average household size was 3.38. There were 74,294 families (75.6% of all households); the average family size was 3.79.

The age distribution of the population was as follows: 91,917 people (27.3%) under the age of 18, 36,506 (10.9%) aged 18 to 24, 101,110 (30.1%) aged 25 to 44, 75,510 (22.5%) aged 45 to 64, and 31,222 (9.3%) who were 65 years of age or older. The median age was 32.4 years. For every 100 females, there were 99.0 males. For every 100 females age 18 and over, there were 97.1 males.

There were 104,237 housing units at an average density of 2,051.5 per square mile (792.1/km^{2}), of which 47,677 (48.5%) were owner-occupied, and 50,617 (51.5%) were occupied by renters. The homeowner vacancy rate was 1.7%; the rental vacancy rate was 7.2%. 160,843 people (47.8% of the population) lived in owner-occupied housing units and 171,865 people (51.1%) lived in rental housing units.

At the 2010 census, Anaheim had a median household income of $59,627, with 15.6% of the population living below the federal poverty line.

According to NeighborhoodScout, German, English, Irish, Italian and Polish are the most common ancestries. Spanish and Vietnamese are the most common spoken non-English languages.

== Economy ==
Sleeping Beauty Castle at Disneyland

Anaheim's income is based on a tourism economy. In addition to The Walt Disney Company being the city's largest employer, the Disneyland Resort itself contributes about $4.7 billion annually to Southern California's economy. It also produces $255 million in taxes every year. Another source of tourism is the Anaheim Convention Center, which is home to many important national conferences. Many hotels, especially in the city's Resort district, serve theme park tourists and conventiongoers. Continuous development of commercial, entertainment, and cultural facilities stretches from the Disney area east to the Santa Ana River, south into the cities of Garden Grove, Orange and Santa Ana – collectively, this area has been labeled the Anaheim–Santa Ana edge city and is one of the three largest such clusters in Orange County, together with the South Coast Plaza–John Wayne Airport edge city and Irvine Spectrum.

The Anaheim Canyon business park makes up 63% of Anaheim's industrial space and is the largest industrial district in Orange County. Anaheim Canyon is also home to the second-largest business park in Orange County.

Several notable companies have corporate offices and/or headquarters within Anaheim.

- Anaheim Memorial Medical Center
- AT&T
- Banco Popular, a bank based in Puerto Rico, has its mainland American headquarters in Anaheim
- CKE Restaurants, the parent company of the Carl's Jr., Hardee's, Green Burrito, and Red Burrito restaurant chains (formerly headquartered)
- Disneyland Resort, part of Disney Experiences, a subsidiary of the Walt Disney Company
- Extron Electronics, designs, manufactures, and services A/V electronics worldwide
- Fujitsu, computer
- General Dynamics
- Hewlett-Packard
- Isuzu North American headquarters
- Kaiser Foundation
- L-3 Communications
- Living Stream Ministry
- Pacific Sunwear
- Panasonic
- Pendarvis Manufacturing
- Raytheon
- Sunny Delight
- Targus, a computer peripheral manufacturer
- Tenet Healthcare
- Toyota Financial Services
- YKK, world's largest zipper manufacturing firm
- Yogurtland
- Zyxel, maker of routers, switches and other networking products

=== Top employers ===
According to the city's 2024 Annual Comprehensive Financial Report, the top employers in the city are:

| # | Employer | # of employees |
|---|---|---|
| 1 | Disneyland Resort | 36,000 |
| 2 | Kaiser Foundation Hospital | 4,500 |
| 3 | OC Sports & Entertainment | 2,000 |
| 4 | Northgate González Markets | 1,000 |
| 5 | Hilton Anaheim | 900 |
| 6 | Anaheim Regional Medical Center | 885 |
| 7 | L-3 Harris Technologies | 850 |
| 8 | West Anaheim Medical Center | 740 |
| 9 | Angels Baseball | 700 |
| 10 | Anaheim Marriott | 550 |

=== Retail ===
Larger retail centers include the Downtown Disney shopping area at the Disneyland Resort, the power centers Anaheim Plaza in western Anaheim (347,000 ft^{2}), and Anaheim Town Square in East Anaheim (374,000 ft^{2}), as well as the Anaheim GardenWalk lifestyle center (440,000 ft^{2} of retail, dining and entertainment located in the Anaheim Resort).

== Attractions ==
- Anaheim Convention Center
- Anaheim GardenWalk
- Anaheim Hills Golf Course
- Anaheim Founders' Park
- Anaheim Ice
- Anaheim Packing House
- Anaheim/OC Walk of Stars
- Angel Stadium of Anaheim
- Dad Miller Golf Course
- Disneyland Resort
  - Disneyland
  - Disney California Adventure
  - Downtown Disney
- Flightdeck Flight Simulation Center
- The Grove of Anaheim, formerly the Sun Theater, formerly Tinseltown Studios
- Honda Center, formerly the Arrowhead Pond of Anaheim
- La Palma Park
- MUZEO, Art Museum located in Downtown Anaheim
- Oak Canyon Nature Center

== Registered Historic Places ==
- Anaheim Orange and Lemon Association Packing House
- Carnegie Library
- Ferdinand Backs House
- George Hansen House
- John Woelke House
- Kroger-Melrose District
- Melrose-Backs Neighborhood Houses
- Old Backs House
- Phillip Ackley Stanton House
- Pickwick Hotel
- Samuel Kraemer Building (American Savings Bank/First National Bank)
- St. Michael’s Episcopal Church
- Truxaw-Gervais House

== Sports teams ==
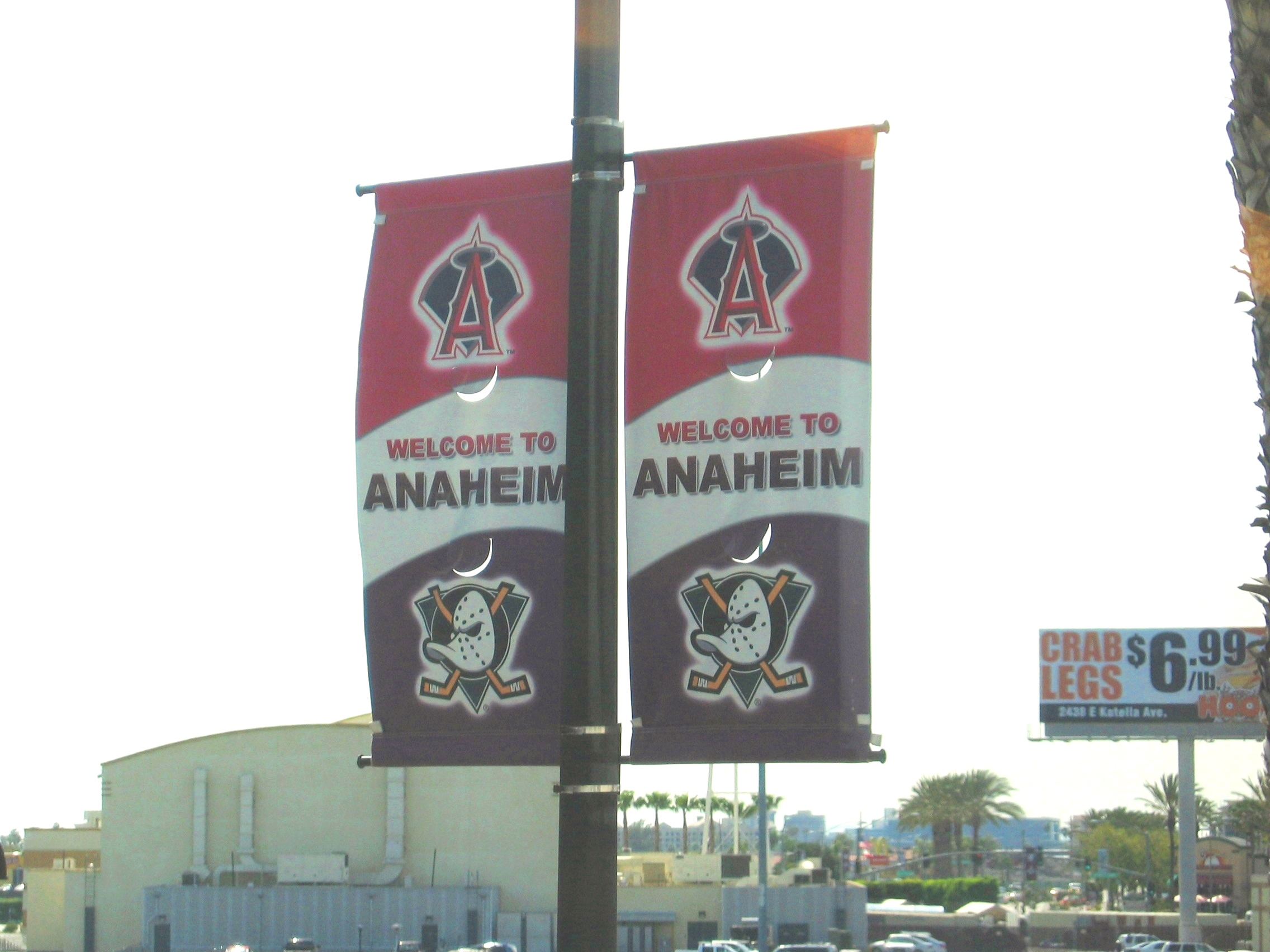
Street banners promoting the Anaheim Ducks and Los Angeles Angels

=== Current teams ===
- MLB team: Los Angeles Angels – 2002 World Series Champions under the name Anaheim Angels
- NHL team: Anaheim Ducks – 2007 Stanley Cup Champions

=== Defunct or relocated teams ===
- NLL team: Anaheim Storm (Folded after 2004–2005 season because of low attendance)
- NFL team: Los Angeles Rams played in Anaheim in Anaheim Stadium from 1980 through 1994 before moving to St. Louis, Missouri.
- NBA team: Los Angeles Clippers played select games in Anaheim at Arrowhead Pond of Anaheim from 1994 through 1999 before playing in Crypto.com Arena in Downtown Los Angeles from 1999 to 2024
- World Football League team: The Southern California Sun played at Anaheim Stadium from 1974 to 1975.
- Arena Football League team: Anaheim Piranhas played at the Arrowhead Pond from 1994 to 1997.
- AFL team: Los Angeles Kiss played at Honda Center from 2014 to 2016.
- Roller Hockey International team: Anaheim Bullfrogs played in the RHI from 1993 to 1997 and 1999, winning the Murphy Cup Championship twice.
- American Basketball Association team: Anaheim Amigos played at the Anaheim Convention Center during the 1967–68 Season, then moved to Los Angeles.
- ABA2000 team: Southern California Surf played at the Anaheim Convention Center from 2001 to 2002.
- NBADL team: Anaheim Arsenal played at the Anaheim Convention Center from 2006 to 2009. The team moved to Springfield, Massachusetts and was renamed for the 2009–2010 season.
- World Team Tennis: The Anaheim Oranges played in 1978.
- Continental Indoor Soccer League Team: The Anaheim Splash, played from 1994 to 1997.
- California Surf of the now defunct North American Soccer League played from 1978 to 1981.
- Anaheim Kingsmen Drum and Bugle Corps A part of Drum Corp International now defunct active from 1958 to 1991

=== Court battle against the Angels ===
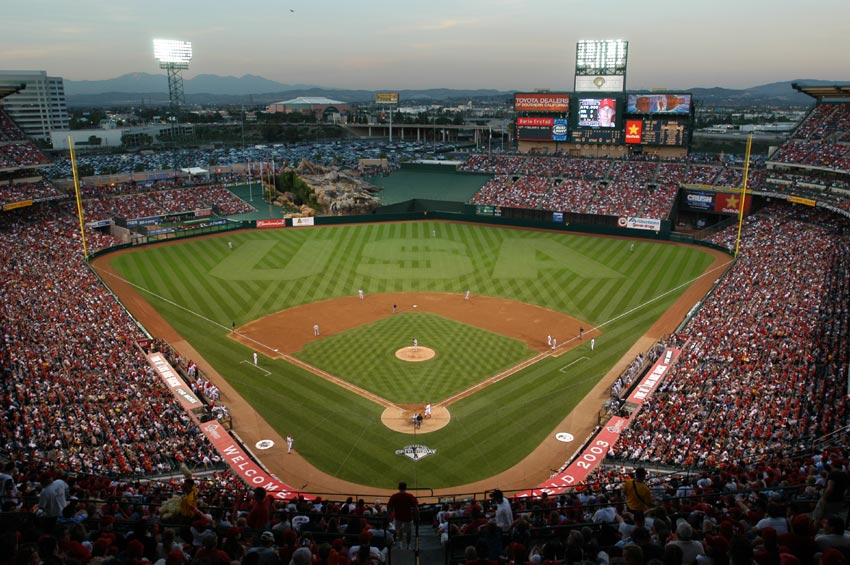
Angel Stadium of Anaheim in 2003

On January 3, 2005, Angels Baseball LP, the ownership group for the Anaheim Angels, announced that it would change the name of the club to the Los Angeles Angels of Anaheim. Team spokesmen pointed out that from its inception, the Angels had been granted territorial rights by Major League Baseball to the counties of Los Angeles, Ventura, Riverside, and San Bernardino in addition to Orange County. The new owner, Arturo Moreno, believed the name would help him market the team to the entire Southern California region rather than just Orange County. The "of Anaheim" was included in the official name to comply with a provision of the team's lease at Angel Stadium which requires that "Anaheim" be included in the team's name.

Mayor Curt Pringle and other city officials countered that the name change violated the spirit of the lease clause, even if it was in technical compliance. They argued that a name change was a major bargaining chip in negotiations between the city and Disney Baseball Enterprises, Inc., then the ownership group for the Angels. They further argued that the city would never have agreed to the new lease without the name change, because the new lease required that the city partially fund the stadium's renovation, but provided very little revenue for Anaheim. Anaheim sued Angels Baseball LP in Orange County Superior Court, and a jury trial was completed in early February 2006, resulting in a victory for the Angels franchise.

Anaheim appealed the court decision with the California Court of Appeal in May 2006. The case was tied up in the Appeals Court for over two years. In December 2008, the Appeals Court upheld the February 2006 Decision and ruled in favor of Angels Baseball. In January 2009, the Anaheim City Council voted not to appeal the court case any further, bringing an end to the four-year legal dispute.

== Government and politics ==
Anaheim was, at one point in time, one of the most politically conservative major cities in the United States. However, in recent years it has been moving leftward. According to the Orange County Registrar of Voters, as of May 5, 2025, Anaheim has 176,980 registered voters. Of those, 58,411 (41.27%) are registered Democrats, 39,885 (28.18%) are registered Republicans, and 37,877 (26.76%) have declined to state a political party.

Anaheim city vote by party in presidential elections
| Year | Democratic | Republican | Third parties |
|---|---|---|---|
| 2024 | 52.90% 61,086 | 43.80% 50,603 | 3.20% 3,744 |
| 2020 | 58.65% 77,895 | 39.25% 52,124 | 2.10% 2,794 |
| 2016 | 57.93% 59,566 | 35.44% 36,438 | 6.63% 6,812 |
| 2012 | 52.73% 47,662 | 44.83% 40,517 | 2.44% 2,206 |
| 2008 | 51.34% 47,433 | 46.46% 42,924 | 2.19% 2,025 |
| 2004 | 40.95% 34,598 | 57.89% 48,914 | 1.16% 982 |
| 2000 | 43.93% 34,787 | 52.28% 41,401 | 3.80% 3,006 |
| 1996 | 40.38% 28,924 | 48.86% 34,999 | 10.75% 7,703 |
| 1992 | 32.46% 27,211 | 43.39% 36,375 | 24.16% 20,255 |
| 1988 | 31.58% 24,881 | 67.21% 52,954 | 1.22% 959 |
| 1984 | 24.28% 19,266 | 74.66% 59,238 | 1.05% 836 |
| 1980 | 23.34% 17,816 | 68.08% 51,960 | 8.58% 6,546 |
| 1976 | 39.67% 26,464 | 58.10% 38,758 | 2.23% 1,484 |

=== City government ===
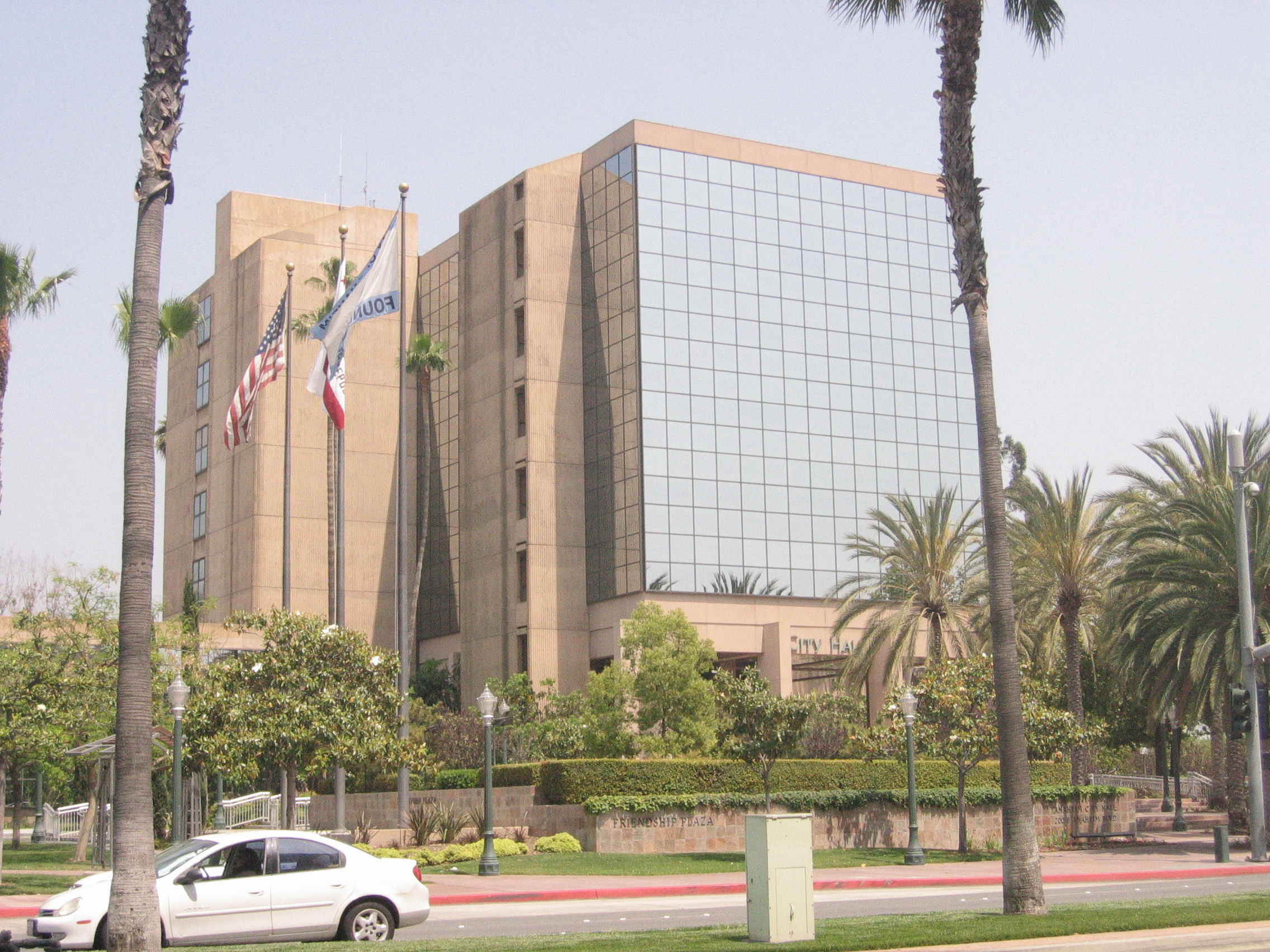
Anaheim City Hall

Under its city charter, Anaheim operates under a council–manager government. Legislative authority is vested in a city council of seven nonpartisan members, who hire a professional city manager to oversee day-to-day operations. The mayor serves as the presiding officer of the city council in a first among equals role. Under the city's term limits, an individual may serve a maximum of two terms as a city council member and two terms as the mayor.

Up until 2014, all council seats were elected at large. Voters elected the mayor and four other members of the city council to serve four-year staggered terms. Elections for two council seats were held in years divisible by four while elections for the mayor and the two other council seats were elected during the intervening even-numbered years.

In response to protests and a California Voting Rights Act lawsuit by the American Civil Liberties Union and several residents, the city placed two measures on the November 2014 ballot. Measure L proposed that council members be elected by district instead of at large. Measure M proposed to increase the number of council seats from five to seven. Both measures passed.

The current city council consists of:

- Mayor Ashleigh Aitken (since 2022)
- Mayor Pro Tem Natalie Meeks, District 6 (since 2022)
- Ryan Balius, District 1 (since 2024)
- Carlos A. Leon, District 2 (since 2022)
- Natalie Rubalcava District 3 (since 2022)
- Norma Campos Kurtz District 4 (since 2023)
- Kristen M. Maahs, District 5 (since 2024)

=== Federal, state and county representation ===
In the United States House of Representatives, Anaheim is split between two districts:

- California's 40th congressional district, represented by Republican Young Kim since 2021, and
- California's 46th congressional district, represented by Democrat Lou Correa since 2017.

In the California State Senate, Anaheim is split between two districts:

- the 34th senatorial district, represented by Democrat Tom Umberg since 2018, and
- the 37th senatorial district, represented by Republican Steven Choi since 2024.

In the California State Assembly, Anaheim is split among three districts:

- the 59th Assembly district, represented by Republican Phillip Chen since 2016,
- the 67th Assembly district, represented by Democrat Sharon Quirk-Silva since 2016, and
- the 68th Assembly district, represented by Democrat Avelino Valencia since 2022.

On the Orange County Board of Supervisors, Anaheim is split among three districts, with Anaheim Hills in the 3rd District, West Anaheim and northern Anaheim in the 4th District, and the remainder of Anaheim in the 2nd district:

- the 2nd supervisorial district, represented by Democrat Vicente Sarmiento since 2023,
- the 3rd supervisorial district, represented by Republican Donald P. Wagner since 2019, and
- the 4th supervisorial district, represented by Democrat Doug Chaffee since 2019.

== Infrastructure ==
=== Emergency services ===
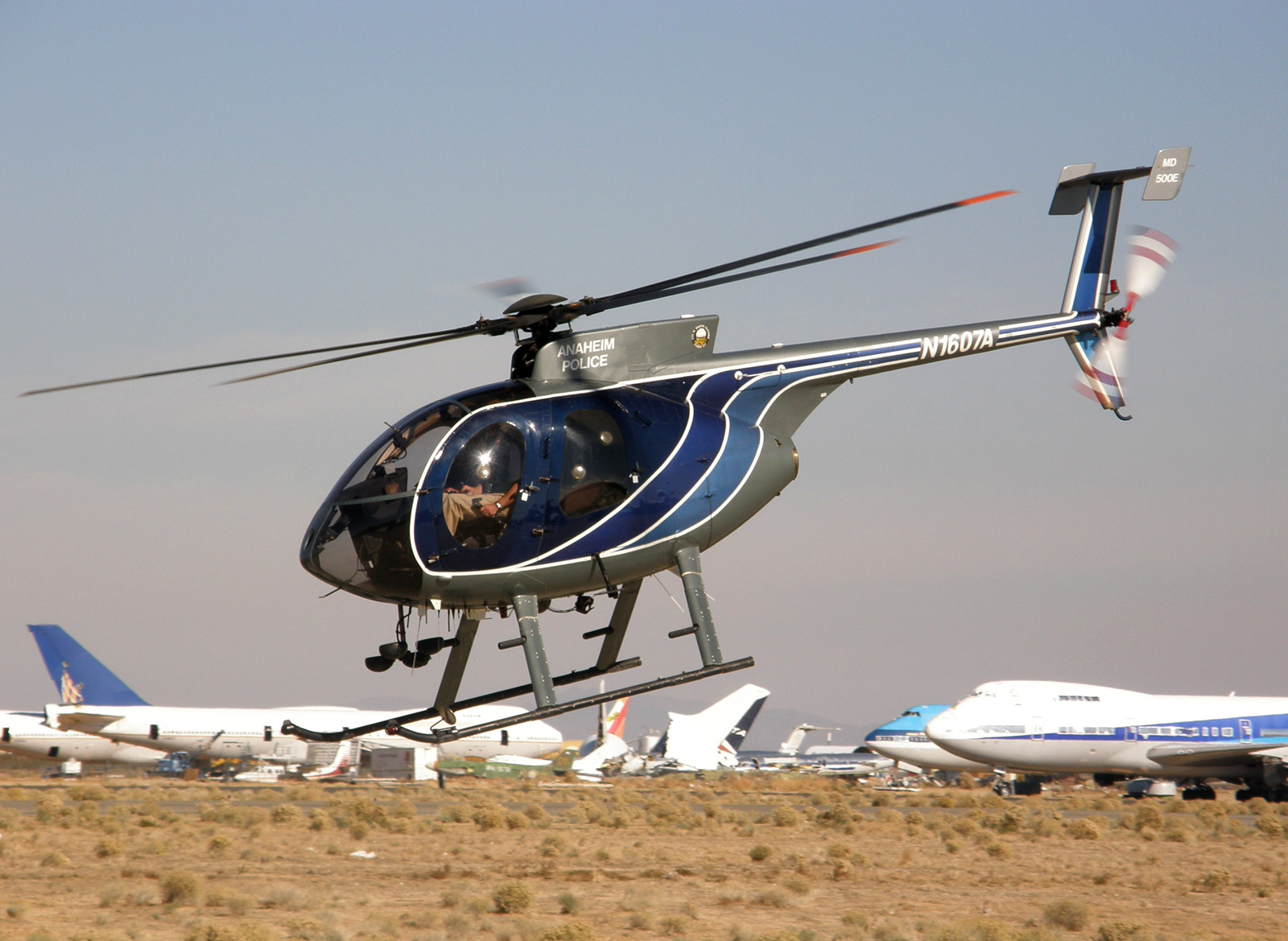
Anaheim Police Department's MD500E helicopter, ANGEL

Fire protection is provided by the Anaheim Fire Department, Disneyland Resort has its own Fire Department, though it does rely on the Anaheim Fire Department for support, and for Paramedic Services. Law enforcement is provided by the Anaheim Police Department. Ambulance service is provided by Care Ambulance Service.

=== Health Care ===
Anaheim is serviced by several medical facilities:

- Kaiser Permanente Orange County-Anaheim Medical Center (Hospital)
- Anaheim Global Medical Center (Acute-Care Hospital)
- AHMC Anaheim Regional Medical Center (Clinic)
- West Anaheim Medical Center (Acute-Care Hospital)

=== Anaheim Public Utilities ===
Anaheim Public Utilities is the only municipal owned water and electric utility in Orange County, providing residential and business customers with water and electric services. The utility is regulated and governed locally by the City Council. A Public Utilities Board, made up of Anaheim residents, advises the City Council on major utility issues. Water is sourced from the Metropolitan Water District of Southern California, importing water from Northern California and the Colorado River. Additionally, the Orange County Water District manages groundwater from the Santa Ana River, local rainfall, recycled water, and imported water.

Anaheim has decided to bury power lines along major transportation corridors, converting its electricity system for aesthetic and reliability purposes. To minimize the impact on customer bills, undergrounding is taking place slowly over a period of 50 years, funded by a 4% surcharge on electric bills.

== Crime ==
In 2019, Anaheim reported 8 murders; given its population, this rate was lower than the average national rate by 17%. Reported rapes in the city are relatively uncommon as well, but have been increasing, along with the national average. Robbery (396 reported incidents) and aggravated assault (575 incidents) rank among the most frequent violent crimes in the city, though robbery rates are slightly less than the national average. 1,123 burglaries were reported, as well as 5,904 thefts and 1,231 car thefts. All three types of crime were below average.

The Uniform Crime Report (UCR), collected annually by the FBI, compiles police statistics from local and state law enforcement agencies across the nation. The UCR records Part I and Part II crimes. Part I crimes become known to law enforcement and are considered the most serious crimes including homicide, rape, robbery, aggravated assault, burglary, larceny, motor vehicle theft, and arson. Part II crimes only include arrest data. The 2023 UCR Data for Anaheim is listed below:

2023 UCR Data
| | Aggravated Assault | Homicide | Rape | Robbery | Burglary | Larceny Theft | Motor Vehicle Theft | Arson |
|---|---|---|---|---|---|---|---|---|
| Anaheim | 1,770 | 8 | 132 | 349 | 1,518 | 5,298 | 1,610 | 39 |

== Education ==
=== Schools ===
Anaheim is served by seven public school districts:

- Anaheim Elementary School District
- Anaheim Union High School District (takes students from the mentioned elementary school districts)
- Buena Park School District
- Centralia School District (elementary school district)
- Magnolia School District (elementary school district)
- Orange Unified School District
- Placentia-Yorba Linda Unified School District
- Savanna School District (elementary school district)

Anaheim is home to 74 public schools, 47 of which serve elementary students, nine are junior high schools, fourteen are high schools and three offer alternative education.

Private schools in the city include Acaciawood Preparatory Academy, Cornelia Connelly High School, Fairmont Preparatory Academy, Servite High School and Zion Lutheran School (PS2-Grade 8).

=== Higher education ===
Anaheim has two private universities: Anaheim University and Southern California Institute of Technology (SCIT).

The North Orange County Community College District and Rancho Santiago Community College District serve the community.

=== Libraries ===
Anaheim has eight public library branches.

== Transportation ==
In the main portion of the city (not including Anaheim Hills), the major surface streets running west–east, starting with the northernmost, are Orangethorpe Avenue, La Palma Avenue, Lincoln Avenue, Ball Road, and Katella Avenue. The major surface streets running south–north, starting with the westernmost, are Knott Avenue, Beach Boulevard (SR 39), Magnolia Avenue, Brookhurst Street, Euclid Street, West Street/Disneyland Drive, Harbor Boulevard, Anaheim Boulevard, East Street, State College Boulevard, Kraemer Boulevard, and Tustin Avenue.

In Anaheim Hills, the major surface streets that run west–east include Orangethorpe Avenue, La Palma Avenue, Santa Ana Canyon Road, and Nohl Ranch Road. Major surface streets that run north–south include Lakeview Avenue and Fairmont Boulevard. Imperial Highway (SR 90) and Yorba Linda Boulevard/Weir Canyon Road run as south–north roads in the city of Anaheim, but north of Anaheim, Imperial Highway and Yorba Linda Boulevard become west–east arterials.

Seven Caltrans state-maintained highways (in addition to the aforementioned surface streets SR 39 and SR 90) run through the city of Anaheim, four of which are freeways and one being a toll road. They include the Santa Ana Freeway (I-5), the Orange Freeway (SR 57), and the Riverside Freeway (SR 91). The Costa Mesa Freeway (SR 55), and the Eastern Transportation Corridor (SR 241 toll road) also have short stretches within the city limits.

Anaheim is served by two major railroads, the Union Pacific Railroad and the BNSF Railway. In addition, the Anaheim Regional Transportation Intermodal Center (ARTIC), a major regional transit station near Honda Center and Angel Stadium, serves Amtrak, Metrolink, and several bus operators, and the Anaheim Canyon Metrolink station serves Metrolink's Inland Empire–Orange County Line. ARTIC is a proposed stop on the proposed California High-Speed Rail network.

The Orange County Transportation Authority (OCTA) provides bus service for Anaheim with local and county-wide routes, and both OCTA and the Los Angeles County Metropolitan Transportation Authority operate bus routes connecting Anaheim to Los Angeles County and Riverside Transit Agency operates one bus route to serve Riverside and San Bernardino. Also, Anaheim Resort Transit (ART) provides local shuttle service in and around the Anaheim Resort area, serving local hotels, tourist attractions, and the Disneyland Resort. Disney GOALS operates daily free bus service for low-income youth in the central Anaheim area. A proposal for streetcar service along Harbor Boulevard was rejected in 2018.

Anaheim is equidistant from John Wayne Airport and Long Beach Airport (15 miles), but is also accessible from nearby Los Angeles International (30 miles), and Ontario (35 miles) airports.

== Sister cities ==
Anaheim has the following sister cities:

- Mito, Japan
- Vitoria-Gasteiz, Spain

== See also ==
- History of California
- List of cities and towns in California
- List of museums in Orange County, California
- List of U.S. cities with large Hispanic populations
