= Anaheim Elementary School District =

School district in California, United States

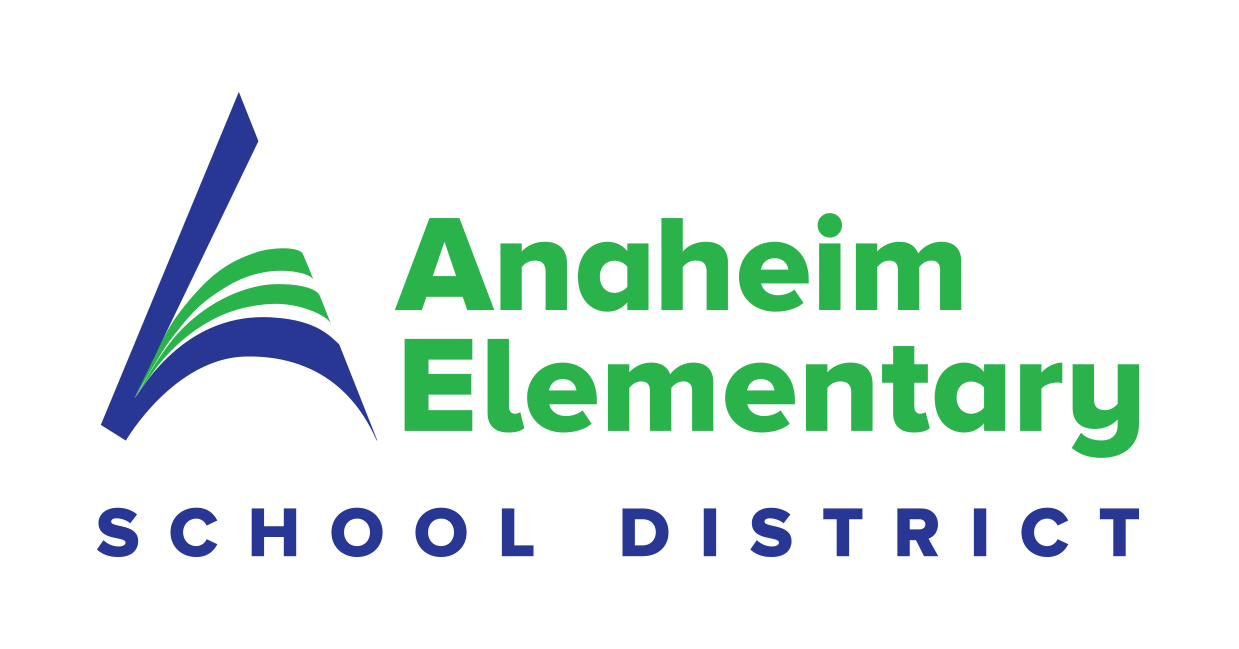

Address
- 1001 South East Street Anaheim, California, 92805; United States

District information
- Type: Public
- Grades: PreK-6th
- Superintendent: Jesse Chavarria
- Schools: 23
- NCES District ID: 0602610

Students and staff
- Students: 15,000 (2023–2024)
- Teachers: 658.93 (FTE)
- Staff: 1,071.95 (FTE)
- Student–teacher ratio: 23.69:1

Other information
- Website: anaheimelementary.org

The Anaheim Elementary School District (AESD), formerly the Anaheim City School District, is a public school district serving the City of Anaheim in Southern California, United States. It oversees 23 schools with an enrollment of approximately 15,000 Pre K-6 students. Anaheim Elementary Education Association (AEEA) is the voice of the educators in Anaheim Elementary since 1948 and is an affiliate of CTA/NEA.

== Schools ==
- Barton Elementary School
- Edison Elementary School
- Franklin Elementary School
- Gauer Elementary School
- Guinn Elementary School
- Henry Elementary School
- Jefferson Elementary School
- Juarez Elementary School
- Lincoln Elementary School
- Loara Elementary School
- Madison Elementary School
- Mann Elementary School
- Marshall Elementary School
- Olive Street Elementary School
- Orange Grove Elementary School
- Ponderosa Elementary School
- Price Elementary School
- Revere Elementary School
- Roosevelt Elementary School
- Ross Elementary School
- Stoddard Elementary School
- Sunkist Elementary School
- Westmont Elementary School
