= National Register of Historic Places listings in Orange County, California =

Location of Orange County in California

This is a list of the National Register of Historic Places listings in Orange County, California.

This is intended to be a complete list of the properties and districts on the National Register of Historic Places in Orange County, California, United States. Latitude and longitude coordinates are provided for many National Register properties and districts; these locations may be seen together in an online map. These historic sites reflect the region's Native American, Spanish and Mexican ethnic heritage. They include historic mansions from the eras of wealth created by citrus farming and oil discovery and reflect political leadership and scientific achievements, as well as other themes.

There are 134 properties and districts listed on the National Register in the county, including 2 National Historic Landmarks. Another property was once listed but has been removed.

This National Park Service list is complete through NPS recent listings posted September 4, 2026.

== Current listings ==
| | Name on the Register | Image | Date listed | Location | City or town | Description |
|---|---|---|---|---|---|---|
| 1 | Lewis Ainsworth House | Lewis Ainsworth House | March 13, 1981 (#81000163) | 414 E. Chapman Ave. 33°47′17″N 117°50′56″W | Orange | |
| 2 | Anaheim Orange and Lemon Association Packing House | Anaheim Orange and Lemon Association Packing House | July 7, 2015 (#15000379) | 440 S. Anaheim Blvd. 33°49′53″N 117°54′44″W | Anaheim | |
| 3 | Artz Building | Artz Building | April 18, 1994 (#94000364) | 150-158 W. Main St. 33°44′29″N 117°49′43″W | Tustin | |
| 4 | Ferdinand Backs House | Ferdinand Backs House | October 14, 1980 (#80000826) | 225 N. Claudina St. 33°50′15″N 117°54′46″W | Anaheim | |
| 5 | Balboa Inn | Balboa Inn | April 11, 1986 (#86000730) | 105 Main St. 33°36′05″N 117°53′56″W | Newport Beach | |
| 6 | Balboa Pavilion | Balboa Pavilion | May 17, 1984 (#84000914) | 400 Main St. 33°36′10″N 117°53′52″W | Newport Beach | |
| 7 | Bank of Balboa-Bank of America | | July 24, 1986 (#86001903) | 611 E. Balboa Blvd. 33°36′07″N 117°53′59″W | Newport Beach | demolished |
| 8 | Beckman Instruments Inc. Administration Building | | January 31, 2017 (#100000620) | 4300 N. Harbor Blvd. 33°55′22″N 117°55′57″W | Fullerton | demolished |
| 9 | Bixby-Bryant Ranch House | Bixby-Bryant Ranch House | January 16, 1997 (#96001537) | 5700 Susanna Bryant Dr. 33°52′30″N 117°42′28″W | Yorba Linda | |
| 10 | A. S. Bradford House | A. S. Bradford House | October 3, 1978 (#78000730) | 136 Palm Circle; 33°53′18″N 117°51′49″W | Placentia | |
| 11 | Brea City Hall and Park | Brea City Hall and Park | May 24, 1984 (#84000917) | 401 S. Brea Blvd. 33°54′51″N 117°54′05″W | Brea | |
| 12 | Builders Exchange Building | Builders Exchange Building | April 29, 1982 (#82002223) | 202-208 N. Main St. 33°44′47″N 117°52′01″W | Santa Ana | |
| 13 | Carnegie Library | Carnegie Library | October 22, 1979 (#79000511) | 241 S. Anaheim Blvd. 33°50′00″N 117°54′45″W | Anaheim | |
| 14 | Casa de Esperanza | Casa de Esperanza | October 1, 1990 (#90001484) | 31806 El Camino Real; 33°30′04″N 117°39′38″W | San Juan Capistrano | |
| 15 | Casa Romantica | Casa Romantica | December 27, 1991 (#91001900) | 415 Avenida Granada; 33°25′16″N 117°37′13″W | San Clemente | |
| 16 | Chapman Building | Chapman Building | September 22, 1983 (#83001212) | 110 E. Wilshire Ave. 33°52′20″N 117°55′23″W | Fullerton | |
| 17 | Christ College Site | | April 16, 1993 (#93000300) | Northeastern corner of the Concordia University (formerly Christ College, from which the name is derived) campus, off University Dr. 33°39′24″N 117°48′27″W | Irvine | |
| 18 | Dr. George C. Clark House | Dr. George C. Clark House | December 12, 1976 (#76000506) | California State University campus 33°53′14″N 117°52′59″W | Fullerton | |
| 19 | Joel R. Congdon House | Joel R. Congdon House | July 22, 2002 (#02000801) | 32701 Alipaz St. 33°29′19″N 117°40′23″W | San Juan Capistrano | Home to The Ecology Center. |
| 20 | Consolidated Orange Growers Precooling & Ice Plant | Consolidated Orange Growers Precooling & Ice Plant | September 20, 2021 (#100006912) | 160 South Cypress St. 33°47′12″N 117°51′23″W | Orange | |
| 21 | Crystal Cove Historic District | Crystal Cove Historic District | June 15, 1979 (#79000514) | Northwest of Laguna Beach; 33°34′29″N 117°50′26″W | Laguna Beach | |
| 22 | C. Z. Culver House | C. Z. Culver House | March 20, 1986 (#86000458) | 205 E. Palmyra; 33°47′04″N 117°51′03″W | Orange | |
| 23 | Cypress Street Schoolhouse | Cypress Street Schoolhouse | July 7, 2015 (#15000380) | 544 N. Cypress St. 33°47′47″N 117°51′23″W | Orange | |
| 24 | Dewella Apartments | Dewella Apartments | February 2, 2009 (#08001406) | 234-236 E. Wilshire Ave. 33°52′21″N 117°55′14″W | Fullerton | |
| 25 | Downtown Santa Ana Historic Districts (North, Government/Institutional and South, Retail) | Downtown Santa Ana Historic Districts (North, Government/Institutional and South, Retail) | December 19, 1984 (#84000438) | Roughly bounded by Civic Center Dr., First, Ross, and Spurgeon Sts. 33°44′54″N 117°52′05″W | Santa Ana | |
| 26 | Oscar Easley Block | Oscar Easley Block | February 17, 1983 (#83001213) | 101 El Camino Real; 33°25′40″N 117°36′42″W | San Clemente | |
| 27 | Ebell Society of Santa Ana Valley | Ebell Society of Santa Ana Valley | July 2, 2001 (#01000682) | 625 N. French St. 33°45′03″N 117°51′49″W | Santa Ana | |
| 28 | Richard Egan House | Richard Egan House | January 17, 2017 (#100000460) | 31829 Camino Capistrano; 33°30′02″N 117°39′45″W | San Juan Capistrano | |
| 29 | Electra (motor yacht) | | May 1, 2023 (#100008894) | Huntington Harbor at 16591 Ensign Ct. 33°43′16″N 118°03′37″W | Huntington Beach | |
| 30 | Elephant Packing House | Elephant Packing House | September 21, 1983 (#83001214) | 201 W. Truslow Ave. 33°52′03″N 117°55′32″W | Fullerton | |
| 31 | Esslinger Building | Esslinger Building | May 16, 1988 (#88000557) | 31866 Camino Capistrano; 33°30′00″N 117°39′40″W | San Juan Capistrano | |
| 32 | Fairview Indian Site | | June 27, 1972 (#72000243) | Address Restricted | Costa Mesa | |
| 33 | Farmers and Merchants Bank of Fullerton | Farmers and Merchants Bank of Fullerton | April 19, 1994 (#94000360) | 122 N. Harbor Blvd. 33°52′16″N 117°55′24″W | Fullerton | |
| 34 | Fender's Radio Service | Fender's Radio Service | July 23, 2013 (#13000511) | 107 S. Harbor Blvd. 33°52′12″N 117°55′28″W | Fullerton | Leo Fender's radio repair shop |
| 35 | First Baptist Church of Orange | First Baptist Church of Orange | March 28, 1996 (#96000327) | 192 S. Orange St. 33°47′11″N 117°51′05″W | Orange | |
| 36 | Floral Park Historic District | Floral Park Historic District | February 2, 2023 (#100007287) | Roughly bounded by Santiago Cr., Broadway, 17th, and Flower Sts. 33°46′01″N 117°52′17″W | Santa Ana | |
| 37 | Frank A. Forster House | Frank A. Forster House | September 11, 1986 (#86002405) | 27182 Ortega Hwy. 33°30′09″N 117°39′19″W | San Juan Capistrano | |
| 38 | Fox Fullerton Theatre Complex | Fox Fullerton Theatre Complex | October 25, 2006 (#06000948) | 500-512 N. Harbor Blvd. 33°52′34″N 117°55′26″W | Fullerton | |
| 39 | Frances Packing House | Frances Packing House | August 2, 1977 (#77000319) | Northeast of Irvine; 33°42′39″N 117°45′48″W | Irvine | This building was demolished. |
| 40 | French Park Historic District | French Park Historic District | May 12, 1999 (#99000551) | Roughly bounded by N. Bush, E. Washington, and N. Garfield Sts., and Civic Center Dr. E. 33°45′12″N 117°51′47″W | Santa Ana | |
| 41 | Fullerton City Hall | Fullerton City Hall | May 22, 2003 (#03000424) | 237 W. Commonwealth Ave. 33°52′21″N 117°55′46″W | Fullerton | Mission Revival complex designed by G. Stanley Wilson, now the police headquarters. |
| 42 | Fullerton College Historic District | | March 10, 2023 (#100008709) | 321 East Chapman Ave. 33°52′34″N 117°55′08″W | Fullerton | |
| 43 | Fullerton First Methodist Episcopal Church | Fullerton First Methodist Episcopal Church | February 13, 2001 (#01000076) | 117 N. Pomona Ave. 33°52′17″N 117°55′18″W | Fullerton | |
| 44 | Fullerton Odd Fellows Temple | Fullerton Odd Fellows Temple | April 26, 2002 (#02000383) | 112 E. Commonwealth Ave. 33°52′13″N 117°55′25″W | Fullerton | |
| 45 | Fullerton Post Office | Fullerton Post Office | August 28, 2012 (#12000549) | 202 E. Commonwealth Ave. 33°52′13″N 117°55′18″W | Fullerton | |
| 46 | Fullerton Union Pacific Depot | Fullerton Union Pacific Depot | October 12, 1983 (#83003551) | 100 E. Santa Fe Ave. 33°52′09″N 117°55′22″W | Fullerton | |
| 47 | Goldschmidt House | Goldschmidt House | October 14, 2004 (#04001136) | 243 Avenida La Cuesta; 33°26′03″N 117°36′37″W | San Clemente | |
| 48 | Greystone Villa-Cabin 18 | Greystone Villa-Cabin 18 | March 15, 2002 (#02000151) | Sievers Canyon, Trabuco Ranger District; 33°35′25″N 117°30′15″W | Cleveland National Forest | |
| 49 | Edward and America Griffith House | | March 11, 2021 (#100006296) | 40 North La Senda Dr. 33°29′32″N 117°44′17″W | Laguna Beach | |
| 50 | George Hansen House | George Hansen House | July 10, 2013 (#13000473) | 400B N. West St. 33°50′10″N 117°55′41″W | Anaheim | |
| 51 | Harmon-McNeil House | Harmon-McNeil House | November 7, 1985 (#85002764) | 322 E. Chestnut St. 33°44′32″N 117°51′48″W | Santa Ana | Site redeveloped. House possibly moved to 817 N Lacy St. |
| 52 | Harrison House | Harrison House | August 21, 1979 (#79000515) | 27832 Ortega Hwy. 33°30′34″N 117°38′42″W | San Juan Capistrano | |
| 53 | Helme-Worthy Store and Residence | Helme-Worthy Store and Residence | March 31, 1987 (#86003668) | 513-519 Walnut St. and 128 Sixth St. 33°39′32″N 118°00′06″W | Huntington Beach | |
| 54 | Hetebrink House | Hetebrink House | July 1, 1993 (#93000597) | 515 E. Chapman; 33°52′32″N 117°54′50″W | Fullerton | |
| 55 | David Hewes House | David Hewes House | September 18, 2017 (#100001605) | 350 S. B St. 33°44′33″N 117°49′34″W | Tustin | |
| 56 | Hillcrest Park | Hillcrest Park | August 11, 2004 (#04000812) | 200 Brea Blvd. 33°52′58″N 117°55′14″W | Fullerton | |
| 57 | Hotel San Clemente | Hotel San Clemente | August 31, 1989 (#89001149) | 114 Avenida Del Mar; 33°25′37″N 117°36′46″W | San Clemente | |
| 58 | Howe-Waffle House and Carriage House | Howe-Waffle House and Carriage House | April 13, 1977 (#77000320) | Sycamore and Civic Center Dr. 33°45′02″N 117°51′56″W | Santa Ana | |
| 59 | Hunt Center and Library | Hunt Center and Library | March 29, 2019 (#100003550) | 1645 W. Valencia Dr. & 201 S. Basque Ave. 33°52′07″N 117°57′18″W | Fullerton | |
| 60 | Huntington Beach Elementary School Gymnasium and Plunge | Huntington Beach Elementary School Gymnasium and Plunge | December 29, 1994 (#94001499) | 1600 Palm Ave. 33°40′10″N 118°00′18″W | Huntington Beach | |
| 61 | Huntington Beach Municipal Pier | Huntington Beach Municipal Pier | August 24, 1989 (#89001203) | Main St. and Pacific Coast Highway; 33°39′12″N 118°00′17″W | Huntington Beach | |
| 62 | Huntington Beach Public Library on Triangle Park | Huntington Beach Public Library on Triangle Park | April 16, 2013 (#13000157) | 525 Main St. 33°39′44″N 117°59′57″W | Huntington Beach | |
| 63 | Irvine Bean and Growers Association Building | Irvine Bean and Growers Association Building | January 13, 1986 (#86000068) | 14972 Sand Canyon Ave. 33°40′29″N 117°45′25″W | Irvine | |
| 64 | Irvine Blacksmith Shop | Irvine Blacksmith Shop | March 20, 1986 (#86000452) | 14952 Sand Canyon Ave. 33°40′34″N 117°45′29″W | Irvine | |
| 65 | Irvine Park | Irvine Park | April 7, 1983 (#83001215) | 21401 Chapman Ave. 33°47′43″N 117°44′54″W | Orange | |
| 66 | Hugh Edgar Johnson House | Hugh Edgar Johnson House | February 4, 2021 (#100006089) | 444 W. Brookdale Pl. 33°52′35″N 117°55′59″W | Fullerton | |
| 67 | George Key Ranch | George Key Ranch | April 21, 1975 (#75000449) | 625 Bastanchury Rd. 33°53′49″N 117°52′03″W | Placentia | |
| 68 | Lydia D. Killefer School | Lydia D. Killefer School | April 7, 2015 (#15000123) | 541 N. Lemon St. 33°47′46″N 117°51′18″W | Orange | |
| 69 | Samuel Kraemer Building (American Savings Bank/First National Bank) | Samuel Kraemer Building (American Savings Bank/First National Bank) | June 16, 1983 (#83001217) | 76 S. Claudina St; 33°50′09″N 117°54′46″W | Anaheim | |
| 70 | Kroger-Melrose District | Kroger-Melrose District | June 19, 1985 (#85001326) | Roughly bounded by Lincoln Ave., S. Kroger, W. Broadway and S. Philadelphia; 33°50′06″N 117°54′29″W | Anaheim | |
| 71 | Lighter-than-Air Ship Hangars | Lighter-than-Air Ship Hangars | April 3, 1975 (#75000451) | Valencia and Redhill Aves. 33°42′13″N 117°49′23″W | Tustin | |
| 72 | Los Rios Street Historic District | Los Rios Street Historic District | April 4, 1983 (#83001216) | 31600-31921 Los Rios St. 33°30′06″N 117°39′49″W | San Juan Capistrano | |
| 73 | Lovell Beach House | Lovell Beach House | February 5, 1974 (#74000545) | 1242 W. Ocean Front; 33°36′21″N 117°55′04″W | Newport Beach | |
| 74 | Mariona | Mariona | March 29, 1984 (#84000922) | 2529 S. Coast Hwy. 33°31′25″N 117°45′53″W | Laguna Beach | |
| 75 | Masonic Temple | Masonic Temple | March 31, 1995 (#95000355) | 501 N. Harbor Blvd. 33°52′27″N 117°55′25″W | Fullerton | |
| 76 | Melrose-Backs Neighborhood Houses | Melrose-Backs Neighborhood Houses | April 3, 1986 (#86000783) | 226 and 228 E. Adele and 303, 307, 317, 321 N. Philadelphia; 33°50′19″N 117°54′40″W | Anaheim | |
| 77 | George W. Minter House | George W. Minter House | June 9, 1980 (#80000830) | 322 W. 3rd St. 33°44′49″N 117°52′12″W | Santa Ana | |
| 78 | Mission San Juan Capistrano | Mission San Juan Capistrano | September 3, 1971 (#71000170) | Camino Capistrano and Ortega Hwy. 33°30′10″N 117°39′42″W | San Juan Capistrano | |
| 79 | Modjeska House | Modjeska House | December 11, 1972 (#72000244) | Modjeska Canyon Rd. 33°43′05″N 117°37′26″W | Modjeska Canyon | |
| 80 | Montanez Adobe | Montanez Adobe | April 21, 1975 (#75000450) | 31745 Los Rios St. 33°30′06″N 117°39′49″W | San Juan Capistrano | |
| 81 | Muckenthaler House | Muckenthaler House | May 31, 1980 (#80000829) | 1201 W. Malvern Ave. 33°52′33″N 117°56′35″W | Fullerton | |
| 82 | New Lynn Theater | New Lynn Theater | March 10, 2023 (#100008710) | 154-162 South Coast Hwy. 33°32′33″N 117°47′05″W | Laguna Beach | |
| 83 | Newland House | Newland House | October 24, 1985 (#85003374) | 19820 Beach Blvd. 33°40′35″N 117°59′14″W | Huntington Beach | |
| 84 | Richard Nixon Birthplace | Richard Nixon Birthplace | December 17, 1971 (#71000171) | 18061 Yorba Linda Blvd. 33°53′21″N 117°46′33″W | Yorba Linda | |
| 85 | North Beach Historic District | North Beach Historic District | December 15, 2020 (#100005943) | Roughly bounded by North El Camino Real, Avenida Estacion, and Boca De La Playa; 33°25′56″N 117°37′58″W | San Clemente | |
| 86 | Odd Fellows Hall | Odd Fellows Hall | August 18, 1983 (#83001218) | 309-311 N. Main St. 33°44′51″N 117°51′59″W | Santa Ana | |
| 87 | Old Backs House | | October 14, 1980 (#80000827) | 215 N. Claudina St. 33°50′21″N 117°54′49″W | Anaheim | Site redeveloped, house disposition unknown. |
| 88 | Old Towne Orange Historic District | Old Towne Orange Historic District | July 11, 1997 (#97000617) | Roughly bounded by Walnut Ave., Waverly St., W.O. Hart Park, La Veta Ave., Clark St., and Atchison Topeka Railroad Track; 33°47′02″N 117°51′02″W | Orange | |
| 89 | Olive Civic Center | Olive Civic Center | October 7, 1993 (#93001038) | 3030 N. Magnolia Ave. 33°50′21″N 117°50′35″W | Orange | |
| 90 | Orange County Courthouse | Orange County Courthouse | August 29, 1977 (#77000321) | 211 W. Santa Ana Blvd. 33°45′03″N 117°52′09″W | Santa Ana | |
| 91 | Orange Intermediate School-Central Grammar School | Orange Intermediate School-Central Grammar School | April 13, 1993 (#93000282) | 370 N. Glassell St. 33°47′35″N 117°51′10″W | Orange | |
| 92 | Orange Union High School | Orange Union High School | April 14, 1975 (#75000448) | 333 N. Glassell St. 33°47′32″N 117°51′05″W | Orange | |
| 93 | Pacific Electric Railway Company Depot | Pacific Electric Railway Company Depot | October 25, 1979 (#79000517) | 18132 Imperial Hwy. 33°53′28″N 117°48′58″W | Yorba Linda | |
| 94 | Pacific Electric Sub-Station No. 14 | Pacific Electric Sub-Station No. 14 | September 22, 1983 (#83001219) | 802 E. 5th St. 33°44′55″N 117°51′44″W | Santa Ana | |
| 95 | Parker House | Parker House | August 10, 1989 (#89000975) | 163 S. Cypress St. 33°47′12″N 117°51′22″W | Orange | |
| 96 | Miguel Parra Adobe | Miguel Parra Adobe | September 11, 1978 (#78000731) | 27832 Ortega Hwy. 33°30′35″N 117°38′42″W | San Juan Capistrano | |
| 97 | Pickwick Hotel | | December 31, 1979 (#79000513) | 225 S. Anaheim Blvd. 33°50′03″N 117°54′47″W | Anaheim | Demolished in 1988. |
| 98 | Attlio and Jane Pierotti House | Attlio and Jane Pierotti House | September 2, 1993 (#93000907) | 1731 N. Bradford Ave. 33°53′12″N 117°51′57″W | Fullerton | |
| 99 | Plaza Historic District | Plaza Historic District | March 19, 1982 (#82002221) | Roughly bounded by Maple and Almond Aves., Orange and Olive Sts. 33°47′16″N 117°51′08″W | Orange | |
| 100 | The Plaza | The Plaza | December 20, 1978 (#78000729) | Chapman Ave. and Glassell St. 33°47′16″N 117°51′08″W | Orange | |
| 101 | Louis Plummer Auditorium | Louis Plummer Auditorium | September 30, 1993 (#93001019) | 201 E. Chapman Ave. 33°52′28″N 117°55′09″W | Fullerton | |
| 102 | Pomona Court and Apartments | Pomona Court and Apartments | December 14, 2017 (#100001891) | 314-320 N Pomona & 200-204 E Whiting Aves. 33°52′24″N 117°55′20″W | Fullerton | |
| 103 | Porter-French House | Porter-French House | August 5, 1994 (#94000818) | 248 S. Batavia St. 33°47′06″N 117°51′41″W | Orange | |
| 104 | Rankin Building | Rankin Building | February 24, 1983 (#83001220) | 117 W. 4th St. 33°44′53″N 117°52′03″W | Santa Ana | |
| 105 | St. Isidore Catholic Church | St. Isidore Catholic Church | February 11, 2022 (#100007440) | 10961 Reagan St. 33°48′12″N 118°04′10″W | Los Alamitos | |
| 106 | San Clemente Beach Club | San Clemente Beach Club | April 9, 1981 (#81000164) | Avenida Boca De La Playa; 33°25′55″N 117°37′51″W | San Clemente | |
| 107 | Santa Ana City Hall | Santa Ana City Hall | November 10, 1982 (#82000975) | 217 N. Main St. 33°44′49″N 117°51′59″W | Santa Ana | |
| 108 | Santa Ana Fire Station Headquarters No. 1 | Santa Ana Fire Station Headquarters No. 1 | July 10, 1986 (#86001549) | 1322 N. Sycamore St. 33°45′23″N 117°52′05″W | Santa Ana | |
| 109 | Santa Fe Railway Passenger and Freight Depot | Santa Fe Railway Passenger and Freight Depot | February 5, 1992 (#91002031) | 140 E. Santa Fe Ave. 33°52′08″N 117°55′16″W | Fullerton | |
| 110 | Santiago Orange Growers Association Packing House | Santiago Orange Growers Association Packing House | March 11, 2022 (#100007485) | 350 North Cypress St. 33°47′33″N 117°51′23″W | Orange | |
| 111 | Santora Building | Santora Building | December 27, 1982 (#82000976) | 207 N. Broadway; 33°44′47″N 117°52′08″W | Santa Ana | |
| 112 | Seal Beach City Hall | Seal Beach City Hall | August 11, 1983 (#83001221) | 201 8th St. 33°44′31″N 118°06′20″W | Seal Beach | |
| 113 | Jose Serrano Adobe | Jose Serrano Adobe | May 24, 1976 (#76000505) | 21802 Serrano Rd. 33°38′49″N 117°41′20″W | Lake Forest | |
| 114 | Smith and Clark Brothers Ranch and Grounds | Smith and Clark Brothers Ranch and Grounds | September 22, 1983 (#83001222) | 18922 Santiago Blvd. 33°48′51″N 117°48′02″W | Villa Park | |
| 115 | Smith-Tuthill Funeral Parlors | Smith-Tuthill Funeral Parlors | May 19, 1978 (#78000732) | 518 N. Broadway; 33°44′58″N 117°52′09″W | Santa Ana | |
| 116 | Southern Counties Gas Co. | Southern Counties Gas Co. | July 28, 1983 (#83001223) | 207 W. 2nd St. 33°44′48″N 117°52′06″W | Santa Ana | |
| 117 | Spurgeon Block | Spurgeon Block | August 31, 1979 (#79000516) | 206 W. 4th St; 33°44′51″N 117°52′06″W | Santa Ana | |
| 118 | St. Francis by-the-Sea American Catholic Church | St. Francis by-the-Sea American Catholic Church | June 30, 1988 (#88000978) | 430 Park Ave. 33°32′31″N 117°46′55″W | Laguna Beach | |
| 119 | St. John's Lutheran Church | St. John's Lutheran Church | October 16, 1991 (#91001520) | 185 S. Center St. 33°47′10″N 117°50′56″W | Orange | |
| 120 | St. Michael's Episcopal Church | St. Michael's Episcopal Church | February 11, 2004 (#04000017) | 311 West South St. 33°49′36″N 117°54′47″W | Anaheim | |
| 121 | Phillip Ackley Stanton House | Phillip Ackley Stanton House | November 21, 1980 (#80000828) | 2200 W. Sequoia Ave. 33°50′38″N 117°57′33″W | Anaheim | House built in 1929, on the grounds of what is now Fairmont Preparatory Academy |
| 122 | Sherman Stevens House | Sherman Stevens House | January 5, 1984 (#84000926) | 228 W. Main St. 33°44′30″N 117°49′30″W | Tustin | |
| 123 | Carl Stroschein House | Carl Stroschein House | October 14, 2009 (#09000823) | 31682 El Camino Real; 33°30′10″N 117°39′42″W | San Juan Capistrano | |
| 124 | Truxaw-Gervais House | Truxaw-Gervais House | October 29, 1982 (#82000977) | 887 S. Anaheim Blvd. 33°49′25″N 117°54′34″W | Anaheim | |
| 125 | US Post Office Station-Spurgeon Station | US Post Office Station-Spurgeon Station | January 11, 1985 (#85000134) | 605 Bush St. 33°45′05″N 117°51′56″W | Santa Ana | part of the US Post Office in California 1900–1941 Thematic Resource (TR) |
| 126 | Villa Park School | Villa Park School | March 27, 2003 (#02001725) | 10551 Center Dr. 33°48′30″N 117°48′49″W | Villa Park | |
| 127 | VIRGINIA (sloop) | | April 2, 1991 (#91000337) | Dana Point Youth & Group Facility, W. basin, Dana Point Harbor; 33°27′42″N 117°42′10″W | Dana Point | |
| 128 | Walker's Orange County Theater | Walker's Orange County Theater | February 19, 1982 (#82002224) | 308 N. Main St. 33°44′51″N 117°52′01″W | Santa Ana | |
| 129 | WILD GOOSE (yacht) | WILD GOOSE (yacht) | July 19, 2011 (#11000431) | 2431 West Coast Hwy. 33°37′09″N 117°55′19″W | Newport Beach | |
| 130 | Roger Y. Williams House | Roger Y. Williams House | January 10, 2007 (#06001237) | 29991 Camino Capistrano; 33°31′43″N 117°40′19″W | San Juan Capistrano | |
| 131 | John Woelke House | John Woelke House | July 8, 2013 (#13000474) | 400B N. West St. 33°50′11″N 117°55′41″W | Anaheim | |
| 132 | George L. Wright House | George L. Wright House | November 12, 1982 (#82000978) | 831 N. Minter St. 33°45′10″N 117°51′46″W | Santa Ana | |
| 133 | Domingo Yorba Adobe and Casa Manuel García | Domingo Yorba Adobe and Casa Manuel García | February 4, 1982 (#82002222) | 31781 Camino Capistrano; 33°30′01″N 117°39′44″W | San Juan Capistrano | |
| 134 | Yost Theater-Ritz Hotel | Yost Theater-Ritz Hotel | January 23, 1986 (#86000107) | 301-307 N. Spurgeon St. 33°44′50″N 117°51′52″W | Santa Ana | |
| 135 | Young Men's Christian Association-Santa Ana-Tustin Chapter | Young Men's Christian Association-Santa Ana-Tustin Chapter | March 25, 1993 (#93000237) | 205 W. Civic Center Dr. 33°45′05″N 117°52′05″W | Santa Ana | |

== Former listing ==
| | Name on the Register | Image | Date listed | Date removed | Location | City or town | Description |
|---|---|---|---|---|---|---|---|
| 1 | Kraemer Garage | | December 18, 1979 (#79000512) | August 15, 1980 | 252 N. Anaheim Blvd. | Anaheim | |

== See also ==
- List of National Historic Landmarks in California
- National Register of Historic Places listings in California
- California Historical Landmarks in Orange County, California
