= First Baptist Church of Orange =

Historic church in California, United States

- U.S. National Register of Historic Places
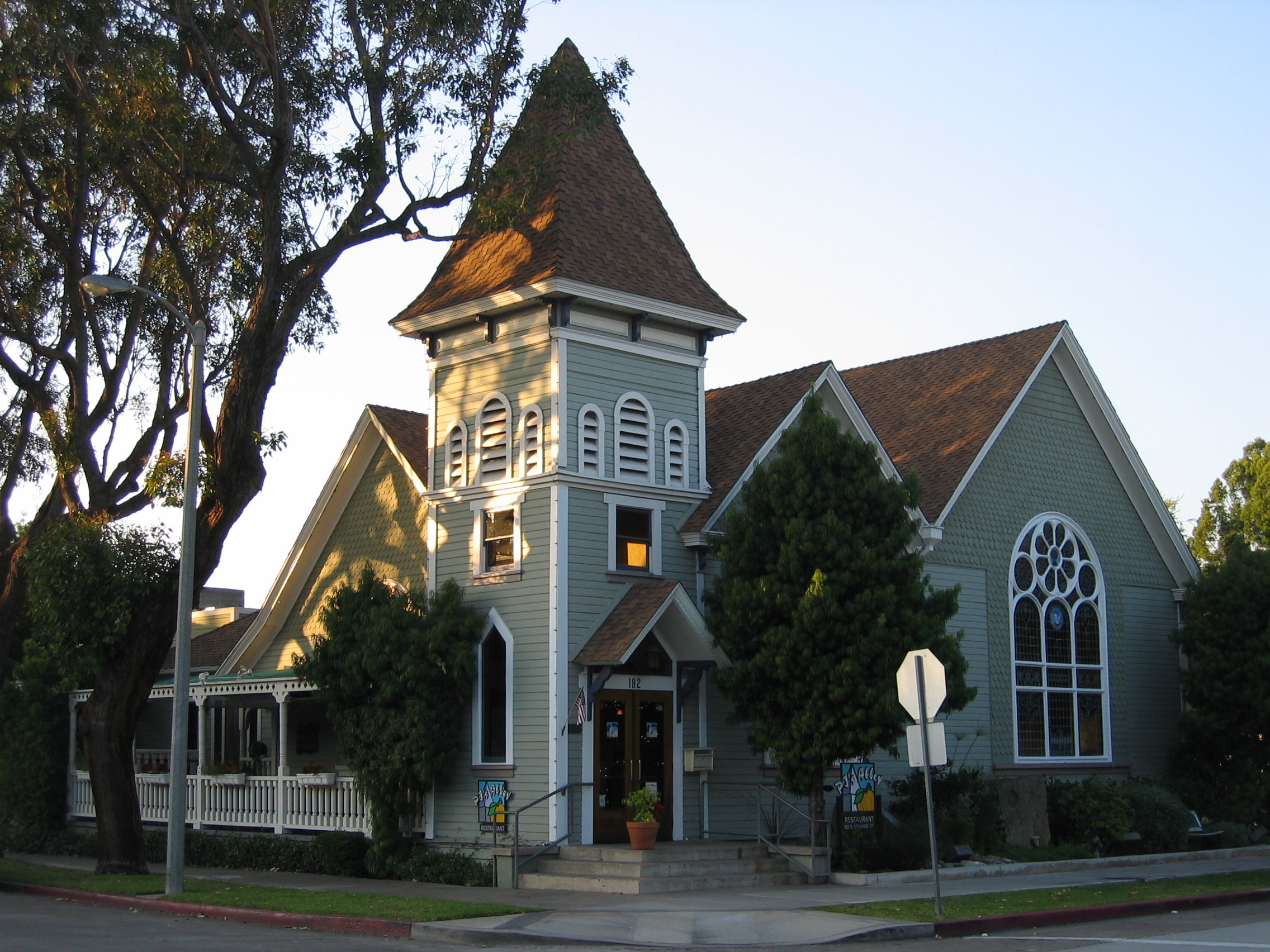

- Location within California Location within the United States
- Location: 192 S. Orange St., Orange, California
- Coordinates: 33°47′11″N 117°51′5″W
- Area: less than one acre
- Built: 1893, 1912
- Architectural style: Queen Anne—Carpenter Gothic
- NRHP reference No.: 96000327
- Added to NRHP: March 28, 1996

The First Baptist Church of Orange (also known as First Missionary Baptist Church; Antioch Baptist Church) is a historic Baptist church building at 192 S. Orange Street in Orange, California. The building is currently owned by Avila's El Ranchito, a Mexican restaurant chain based in Orange County.

The church was built in 1893 and modified in 1912 in a Queen Anne—Carpenter Gothic style. The building stopped operating as a church in 1992. It was added to the National Register of Historic Places in 1996.

== See also ==
- National Register of Historic Places listings in Orange County, California
