= Fullerton Odd Fellows Temple =

- U.S. National Register of Historic Places
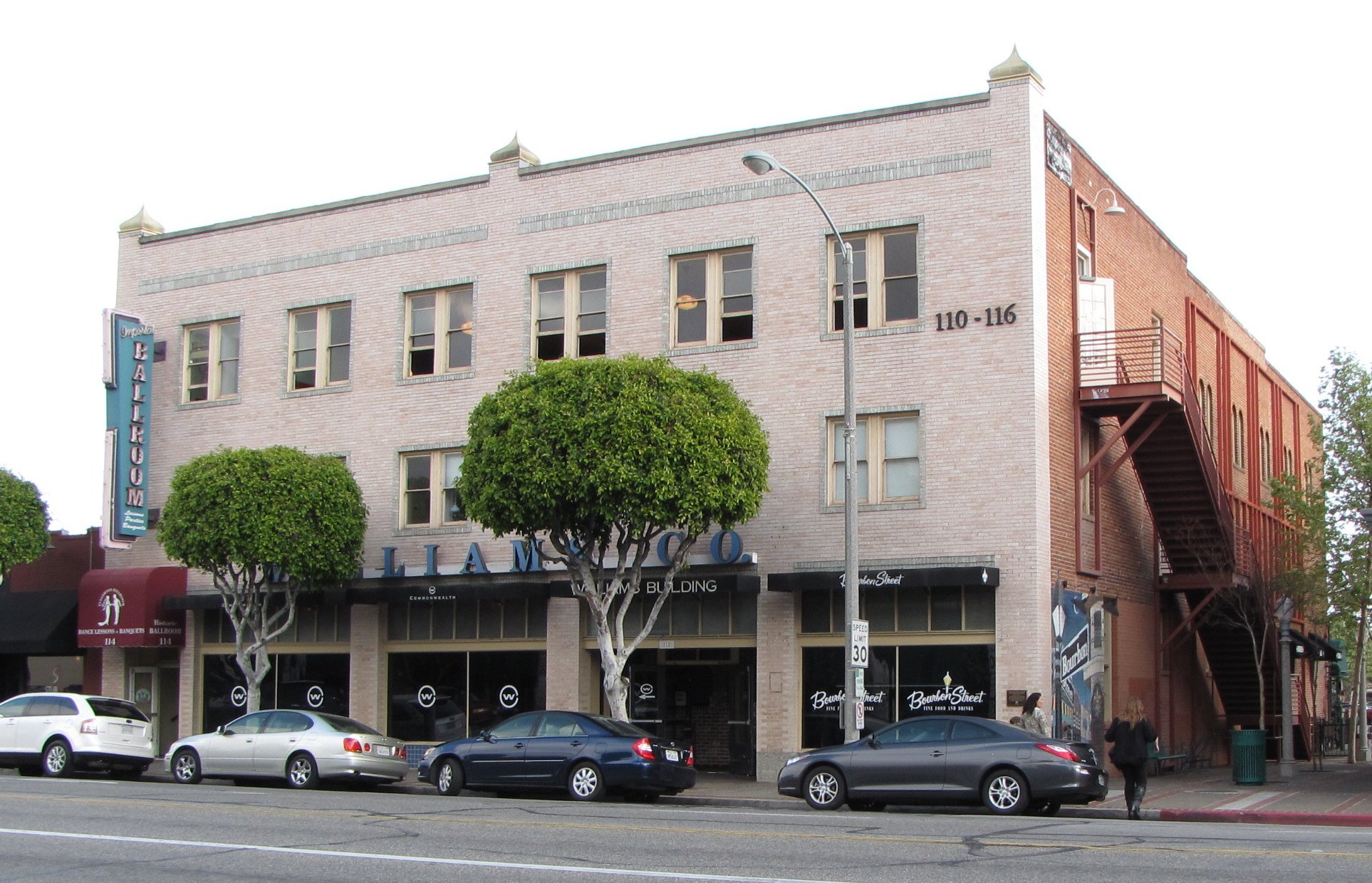

- Location within California Location within the United States
- Location: 112 E. Commonwealth Ave., Fullerton, California
- Coordinates: 33°52′13″N 117°55′25″W
- Area: 0.2 acres (0.081 ha)
- Built: 1927-28
- Architect: Compton, Oliver Summerbell
- Architectural style: Early Commercial
- NRHP reference No.: 02000383
- Added to NRHP: April 26, 2002

The Fullerton Odd Fellows Temple, also known as IOOF Building or Independent Order of Odd Fellows Lodge No.103 or Williams Building, is located in Fullerton, Orange County, California. It was designed by Oliver S. Compton-Hall and built during 1927-28 for the Independent Order of Odd Fellows Lodge Number 103, which existed from 1901 to 1981.

It is located in the historic downtown area of Fullerton, facing the Santa Fe Railway line.

It served historically as an Independent Order of Odd Fellows—IOOF Temple, a Moose Lodge, a meeting hall, a specialty store, a post office, and a music facility. It was built in Early Commercial style.

The Fullerton Odd Fellows Temple was listed on the National Register of Historic Places in 2002.

It is a three-story building 75 feet (23 m) by 110 feet (34 m) in dimension that is made of dark red brick with pale pink and blue terra-cotta tile. Its first floor was designed to be leased out as commercial space; its second floor was reserved for the Odd Fellows group; its third floor was available to other organizations. It was deemed by the city of Fullerton's 1978-79 historic survey to be "one of the most outstanding of Fullerton's brick buildings" and was designated Local Historic Landmark #15 by the Fullerton City Council in November 1980.

== See also ==
- National Register of Historic Places listings in Orange County, California
