= St. Michael's Episcopal Church (Anaheim, California) =

Historic church in California, United States

- U.S. National Register of Historic Places
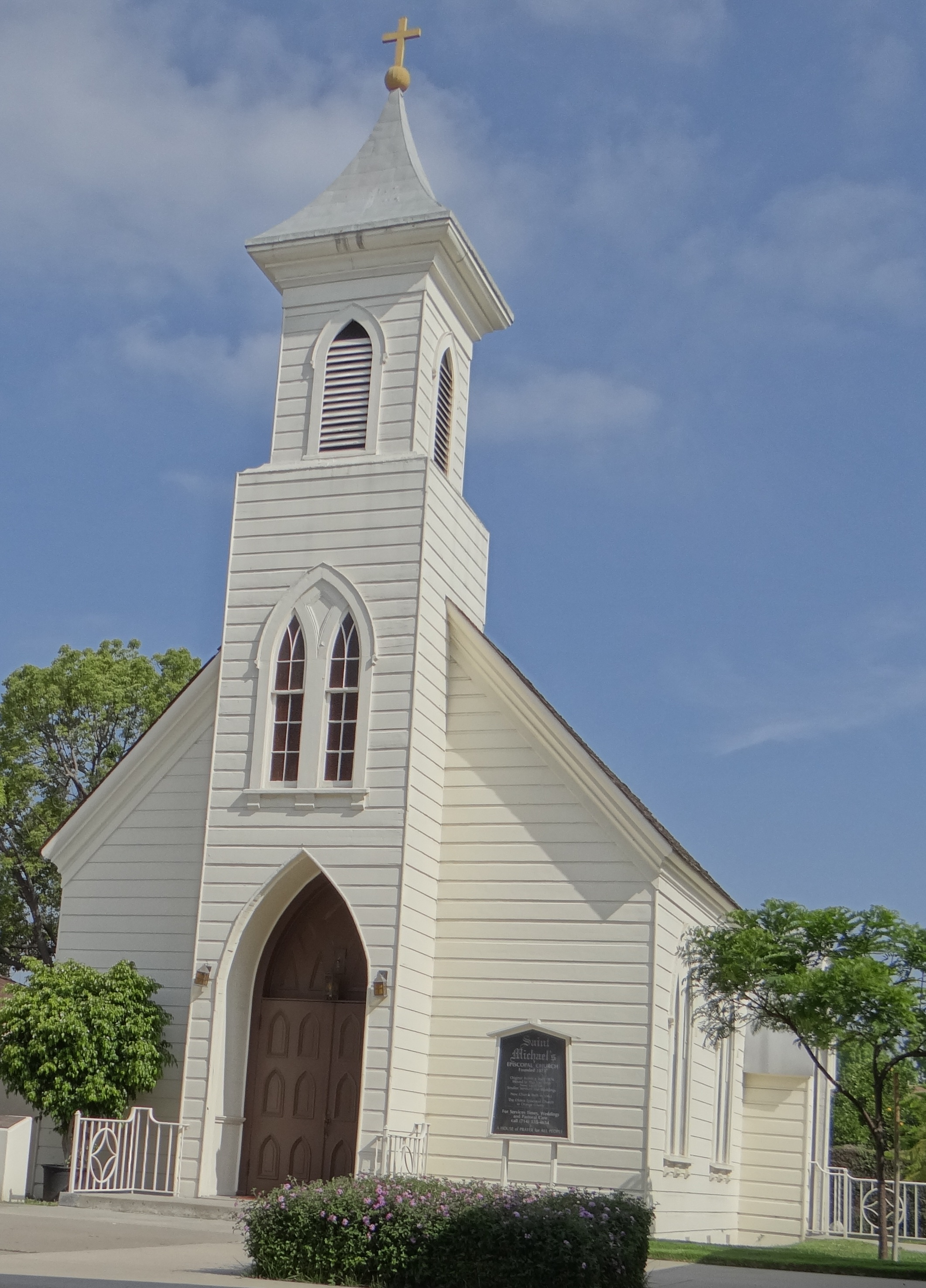

- Location within California Location within the United States
- Location: 311 West South St., Anaheim, California
- Coordinates: 33°49′36″N 117°54′47″W
- Area: less than one acre
- Built: 1876
- Architect: McKinney, C.P.
- Architectural style: Gothic Revival
- NRHP reference No.: 04000017
- Added to NRHP: February 11, 2004

The St. Michael's Episcopal Church in Anaheim, California, also known as The Chapel at St. Michael's Episcopal Church, is a historic church at 311 West South Street. It was built in 1876 and was added to the National Register of Historic Places in 2004.

It is a wood-frame building which is "a modest vernacular example of the Gothic Revival style popular in the mid to late nineteenth century." It has a gable front with a bell tower topped by a pyramidal roof. It has a Gothic arch entryway and double-lancet windows.

The church was built at the corner of Emily and Adele Streets in Anaheim, and was moved within that site in 1914, and then moved in 1955 to its present location, about 1 mile (1.6 km) away.

== See also ==
- National Register of Historic Places listings in Orange County, California
