= Ferdinand Backs House =

Historic home in Anaheim, California

- U.S. National Register of Historic Places
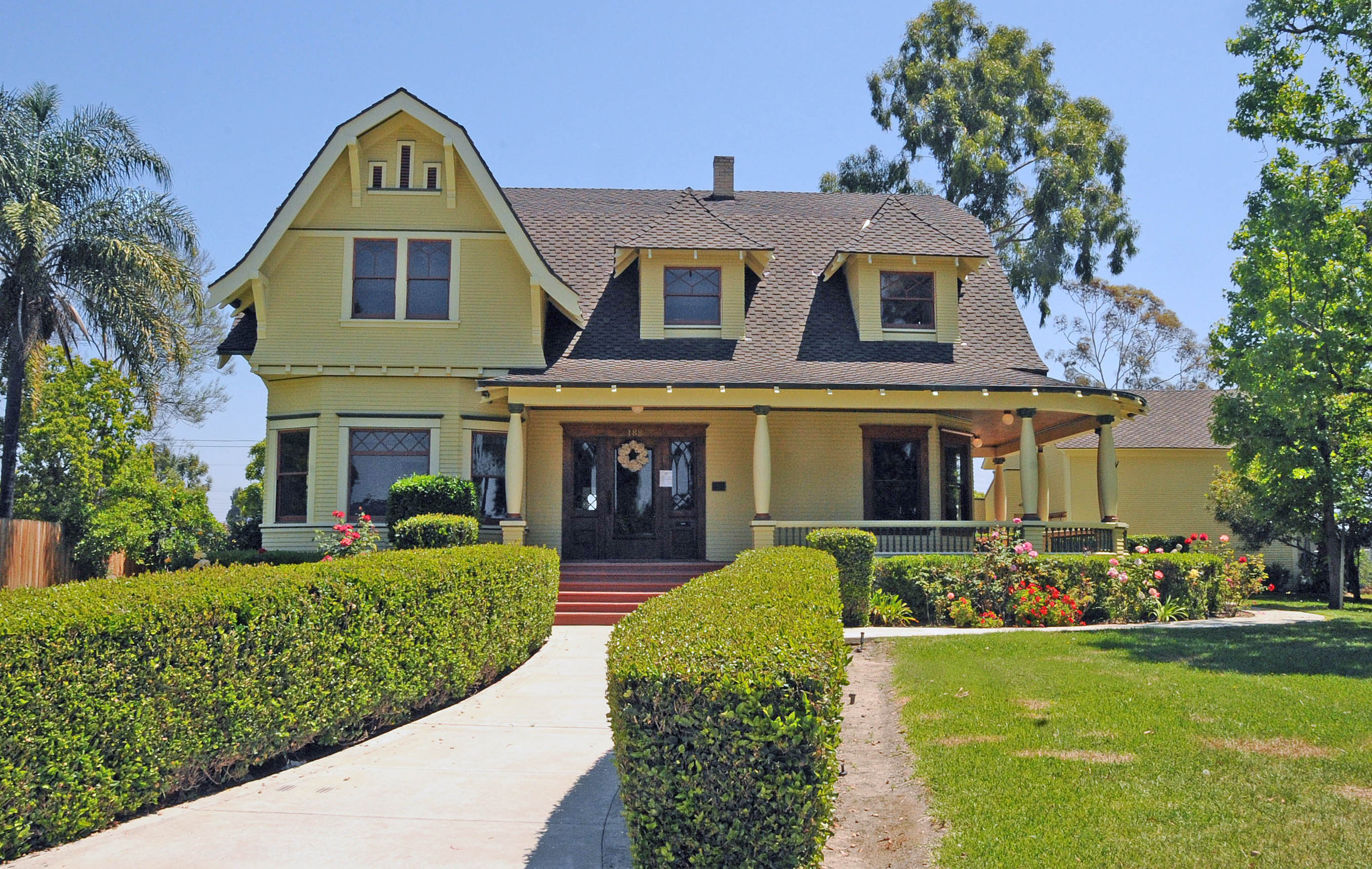
- The house in 2020
- Location: 188 N. Vintage Lane; Anaheim, California; United States
- Coordinates: 33°50′17″N 117°54′22″W
- Built: 1902
- Architect: Edward Niehaus
- Architectural style: Colonial Revival
- NRHP reference No.: 80000826
- Added to NRHP: October 14, 1980

The Ferdinand Backs House is a historic home in Anaheim, California, United States. Ferdinand and Louise Backs, early residents in Anaheim, commissioned the construction of the home in 1902 and Edward Niehaus designed it in the Colonial Revival style.

== History ==
German settlers Ferdinand and Louise Backs moved to Anaheim in the 1870s, some of the earliest residents of the region. In 1902, the Backs began construction on a new home where their previous house stood. Architect Edward Niehaus designed it in the Colonial Revival style at 3,713 square feet (344.9 m^{2}). The home cost US$11,000 to construct (equivalent to $409,000 in 2025) at a time when houses typically cost around $600 to build.

In 1973, preservation consultant Andrew Deneau purchased the home from Frances Backs, daughter of Ferdinand and Louise, for $45,000 (equivalent to $326,000 in 2025).

In 1980, the house received designation in the National Register of Historic Places. In 1986, Deneau listed the house for sale due to high upkeep costs. In 1987, a new owner moved it from its original location at 225 North Claudina Street to its current location at 188 North Vintage Lane. In the process, the home received various renovations.

In 2019, the home's owner listed the property for sale at US$1,200,000.

== See also ==
- National Register of Historic Places listings in Orange County, California
