= Fullerton First Methodist Episcopal Church =

Historic church in California, United States

- U.S. National Register of Historic Places
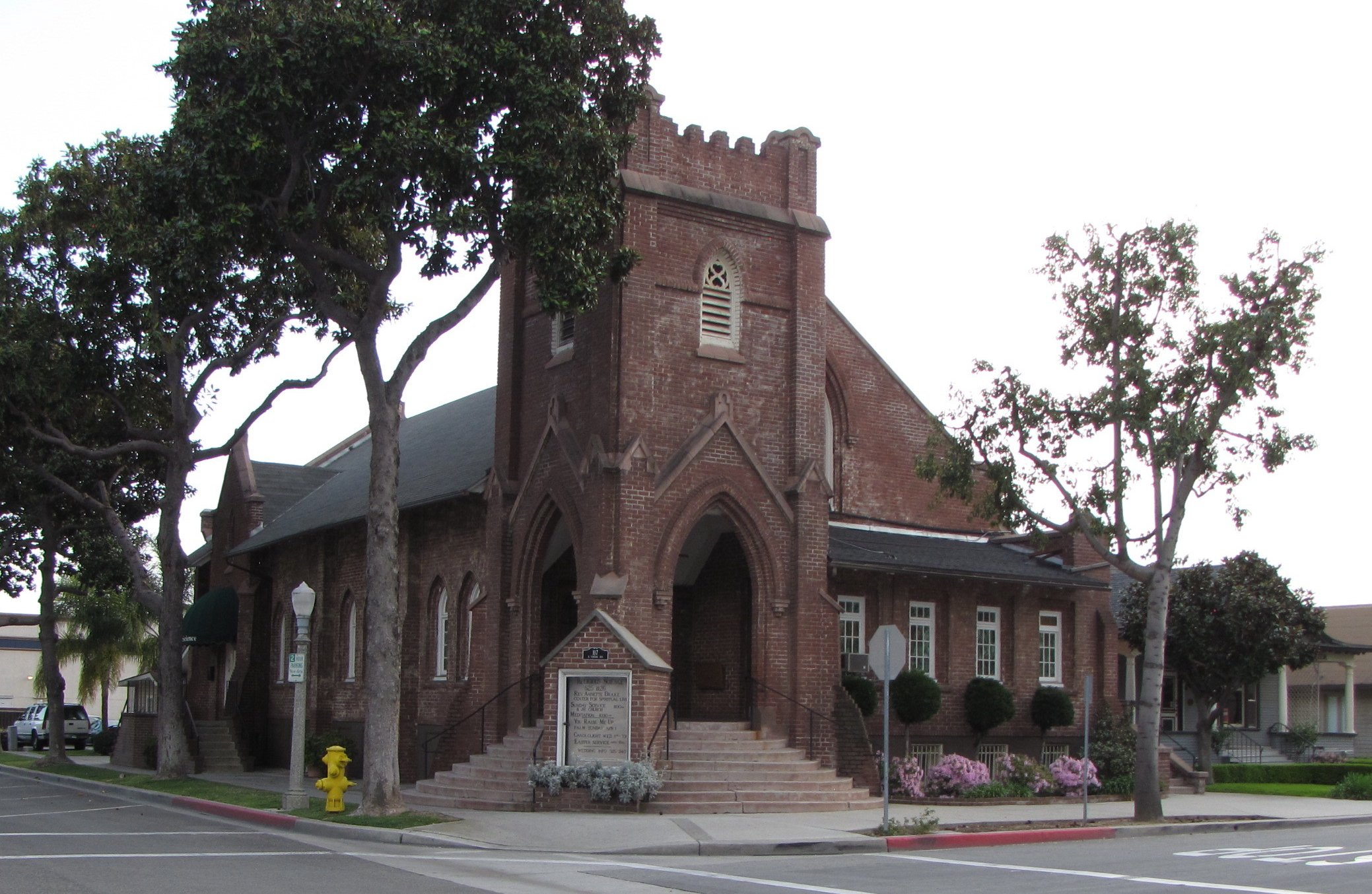

- Location within California Location within the United States
- Location: 117 N. Pomona Ave., Fullerton, California
- Coordinates: 33°52′17″N 117°55′18″W
- Area: less than one acre
- Built: 1909
- Architect: Albert R. Walker; Conner & McCann
- Architectural style: Late Gothic Revival
- NRHP reference No.: 01000076
- Added to NRHP: February 13, 2001

Fullerton First Methodist Episcopal Church (also known as Seventh Day Adventist Church; Church of Religious Science) is a historic church building at 117 N. Pomona Avenue in Fullerton, California. By 2000 it was a Centers for Spiritual Living church.

It was built in 1909 in the Late Gothic Revival style.

The church was added to the National Register of Historic Places in 2001 as "Fullerton First Methodist Episcopal Church".

It is about 40 by 82 feet (12 m × 25 m) in plan and has a square bell tower with a crenellated parapet.

== See also ==
- National Register of Historic Places listings in Orange County, California
