= George Key Ranch =

- Key, George, Ranch
- U.S. National Register of Historic Places
- U.S. Historic district
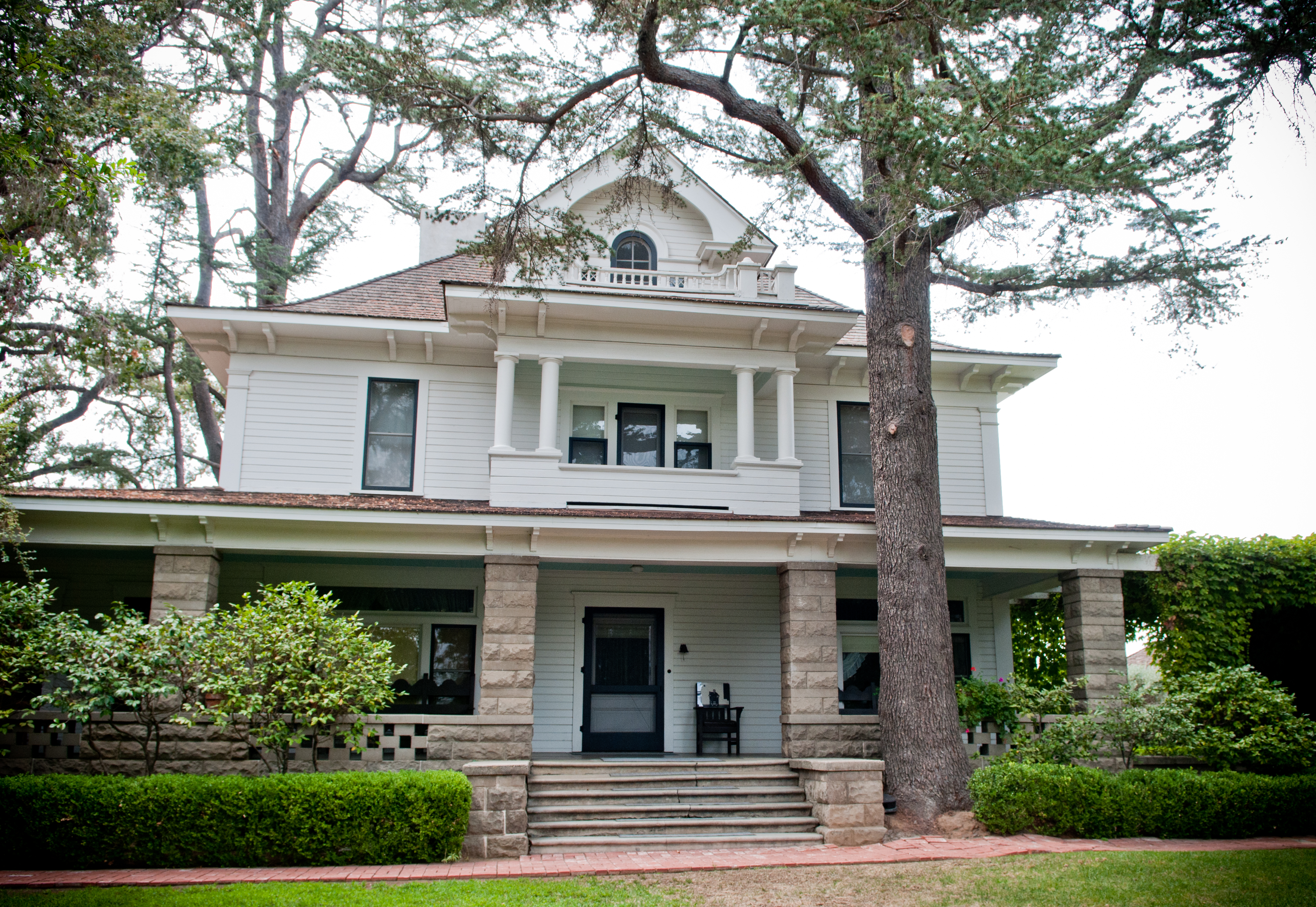

- Location within California Location within the United States
- Location: 625 Bastanchury Rd., Placentia, California
- Coordinates: 33°53′49″N 117°52′3″W
- Built: 1898
- Architect: George Benn Key
- Architectural style: Late Victorian
- NRHP reference No.: 75000449
- Added to NRHP: April 21, 1975

The George Key Ranch Historic District, also known simply as Key Ranch, is a historic ranch and Victorian ranch house located in Placentia, Orange County, California

Two acres of the former ranch is now the George Key Ranch Historic Park operated by Orange County Parks. It includes the historic house museum, a collection of farm equipment and hand tools, a one-acre orange grove, and 3/4-acre verse garden.

The George Key Ranch Historic District was listed on the National Register of Historic Places in 1975.

== See also ==
- National Register of Historic Places listings in Orange County, California
- Ranches on the National Register of Historic Places
