= St. John's Lutheran Church (Orange, California) =

Historic church in California, United States

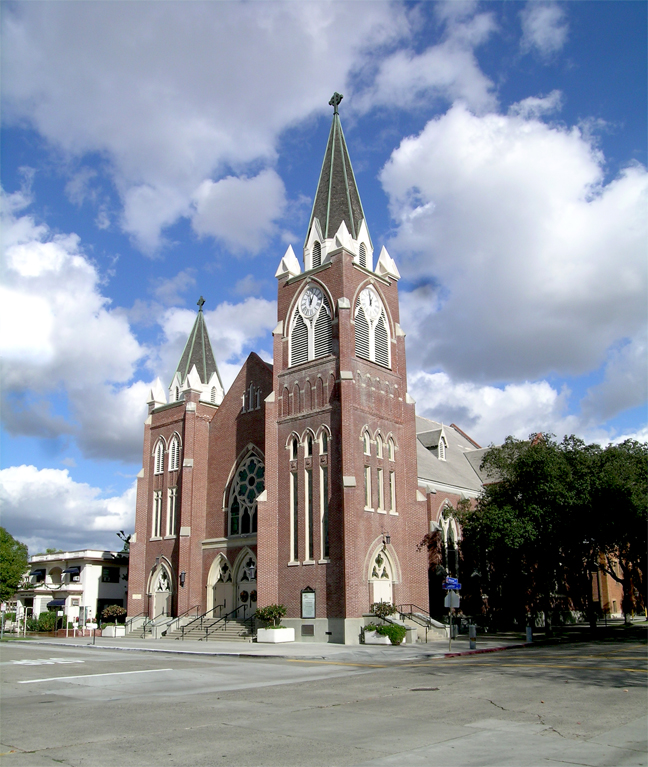
- St. John's Lutheran Church in 2009

- St. John in Orange, CA St. John's Lutheran Church (the United States)
- 33.786274°N 117.849698°W
- Location: 154 South Shaffer Street, Orange, CA 92866
- Country: United States
- Denomination: Lutheran Church–Missouri Synod
- Website: link

History
- Founded: February 19, 1882
- Founder: Reverend Jacob Kogler

Architecture
- Heritage designation: National Register of Historic Places
- Designated: 1991
- Architect: Frederick Harry Ely
- Style: Gothic Revival
- Completed: 1914
- Construction cost: $51,250

- St. John's Lutheran Church
- U.S. National Register of Historic Places
- Location within California Location within the United States
- Location: 185 S. Center St., Orange, California
- Coordinates: 33°47′10″N 117°50′56″W
- Area: less than one acre
- Built: 1914
- Built by: Duker, Miller & Loesher Co.
- Architect: Frederick Eley
- Architectural style: Late Gothic Revival
- NRHP reference No.: 91001520
- Added to NRHP: October 16, 1991

The St. John's Lutheran Church of Orange, California is a Lutheran Church–Missouri Synod church. The church was founded in 1882, and its sanctuary was built in 1913-14. The building was renovated and rededicated in 1990.

The congregation now has more than 4,000 members and a school with 800 students.

== Architecture ==
The church was designed by architect Frederick Eley in the Gothic Revival style. Among the church's distinctive features are sixteen stained glass panels, depicting biblical scenes. The church also has a statue of Jesus in front of the church, behind the altar.

St. John's Lutheran Church was entered in the National Register of Historic Places on October 16, 1991.

== See also ==
- National Register of Historic Places listings in Orange County, California
