= Frederick Eley (architect) =

American architect

Frederick Eley (1884 in Colchester, England – 1979) was an American architect.

He was the first registered architect of Santa Ana, California and is regarded as the area's most prolific and finest early architect. He designed more than 30 schools and many other buildings.

A number of his works are listed on the National Register of Historic Places.

Works include (with spelling variations):

- Ebell Society of Santa Ana Valley, 625 N. French St., Santa Ana, CA (Eley, Frederick), NRHP-listed
- Irvine Park, 21401 Chapman Ave., Orange, CA (Eley, Frederick), NRHP-listed
- Santa Ana Fire Station Headquarters No. 1, 1322 N. Sycamore St., Santa Ana, CA (Eley, Frederick), NRHP-listed
- St. John's Lutheran Church, 185 S. Center St., Orange, CA (Fley, Frederick), NRHP-listed
- Yost Theater-Ritz Hotel, 301-307 N. Spurgeon St., Santa Ana, CA (Eley, Fred), NRHP-listed
- YMCA Santa Ana-Tustin, 205 W. Civic Center Dr., Santa Ana, CA (Eley, Frederick Harry), NRHP-listed
- Masonic Lodge Building (Anaheim, California) (1913)
- Knights of Pythias Building (Anaheim, California) (1913)
