= Brea City Hall and Park =

Historic place in California, United States

- U.S. National Register of Historic Places
- U.S. Historic district
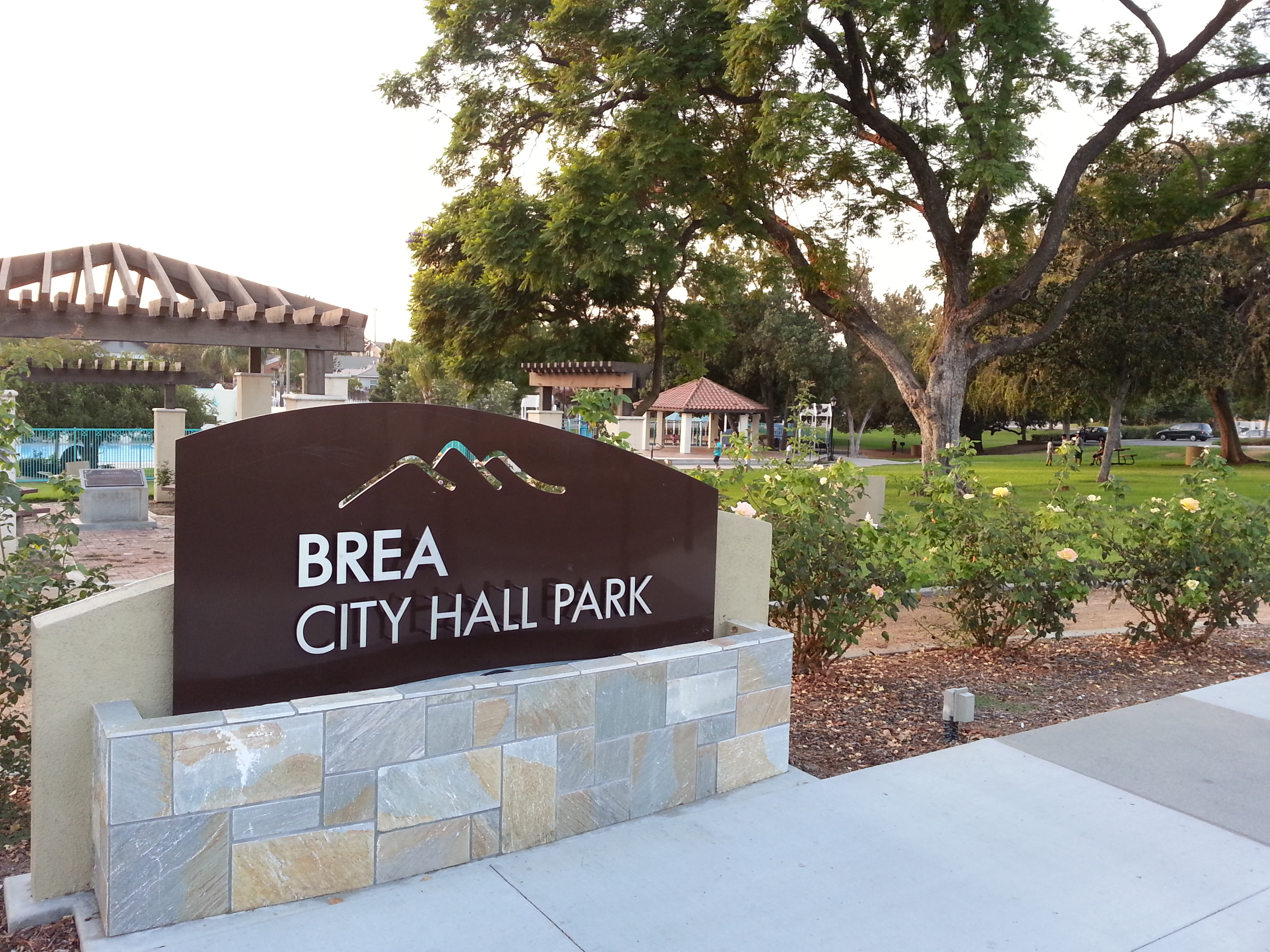

- Location within California Location within the United States
- Location: 401 S. Brea Blvd., Brea, California
- Coordinates: 33°54′51″N 117°54′5″W
- Built: 1928
- Architect: Allen Ruott
- Architectural style: Art Deco, Mission/Spanish Revival
- NRHP reference No.: 84000917
- Added to NRHP: May 24, 1984

Brea City Hall Park, in Brea, California, was listed on the National Register of Historic Places in 1984.

The Brea City Hall, designed by architect Allen Ruott, is combination of Art Deco and Spanish Colonial Revival in styling and was built in 1928.

It included a public library as well as the site for the Brea Police Department and jail.

The site is located near the original Downtown Brea and is one of the city's oldest remaining structures.

An American Legion Hall, built in 1931, is another contributing building in the listing.

The building has been restored and is now home to the Brea Lions Scout Center. The agreement was approved by the City Council in 1994. The City of Brea provided $200,000 and the Brea Lion Scout Foundation added $168,000 for the first phase.

== Amenities ==
A bathhouse and swimming pool and the surrounding park were also all designed by Ruott, as a unit. According to the NRHP nomination, the "use by Ruott in the 1920s of Art Deco/Spanish Revival styling for civic architecture constitutes a major landmark in the small-scale urban environment of Brea and Orange County."

The site has been altered slightly since but much of the structure is still in its original state.

The park, pool and city hall were funded by a $60,000 bond approved by the municipality in an October 1927 special election.

The pool, called the "plunge", is a 25-meter municipal pool and is one of the oldest swimming pools in California still in operation.

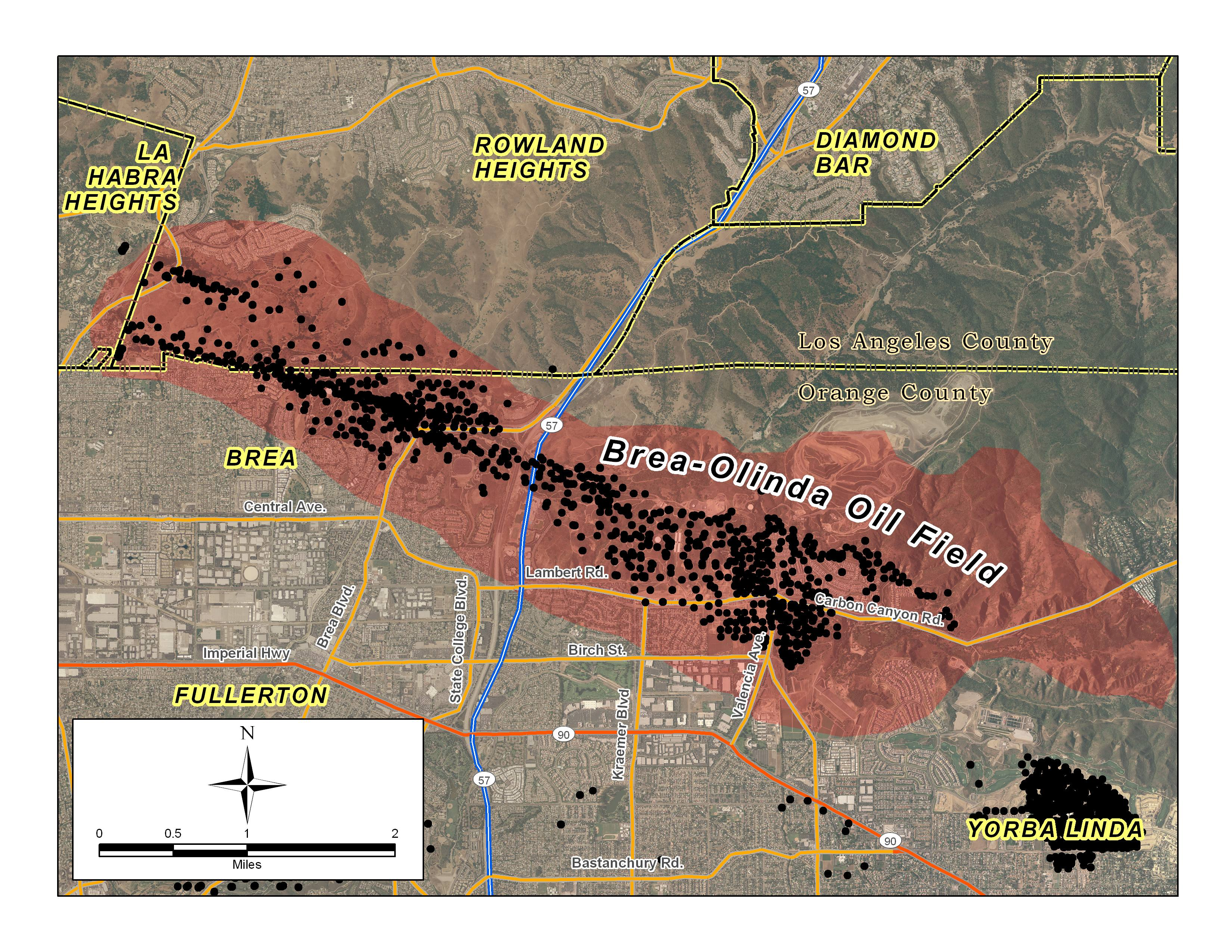
Brea Oil Fields which allowed much of the region to grow under the Union Oil Company in the early 1920s

New additions have been made since the construction of the original park which include a basketball court, rose garden, and a playground which have been constructed since the 1970s.

== History ==
The Union Oil company purchased 1,200 acred of land in 1894 for the purpose of searching for oil. In 1898 the first oil well was installed and lead to the beginning of the oil boom in the hills of the Brea.

Brea was incorporated in 1917 and then had 732 citizens.

The facilities served, among others, oil field workers and their families who lived in an adjacent neighborhood developed in the 1920s by the Union Oil Company. These home are located to the West of the park and some homes still remain.

The site was intended to be the center of local government in the city until the recent opening of a new City Hall and Community Center along with other civic buildings. The planning and construction of the City Hall and Park took place during the time period of the Chicago World's Fair and influenced city leaders in pushing for civic pride through architecture influenced by the City Beautiful Movement.

== Events ==
The City of Brea hosts the Country Fair every year at City Hall Park and provides a variety of games, food, rides, and live entertainment

A pancake breakfast is held in the morning followed by the fair. Events include a car show, parade, dog show, as well as swimming at the Plunge.

== See also ==
- National Register of Historic Places listings in Orange County, California
