= Spring Field Banquet Center =

- Masonic Temple
- U.S. National Register of Historic Places
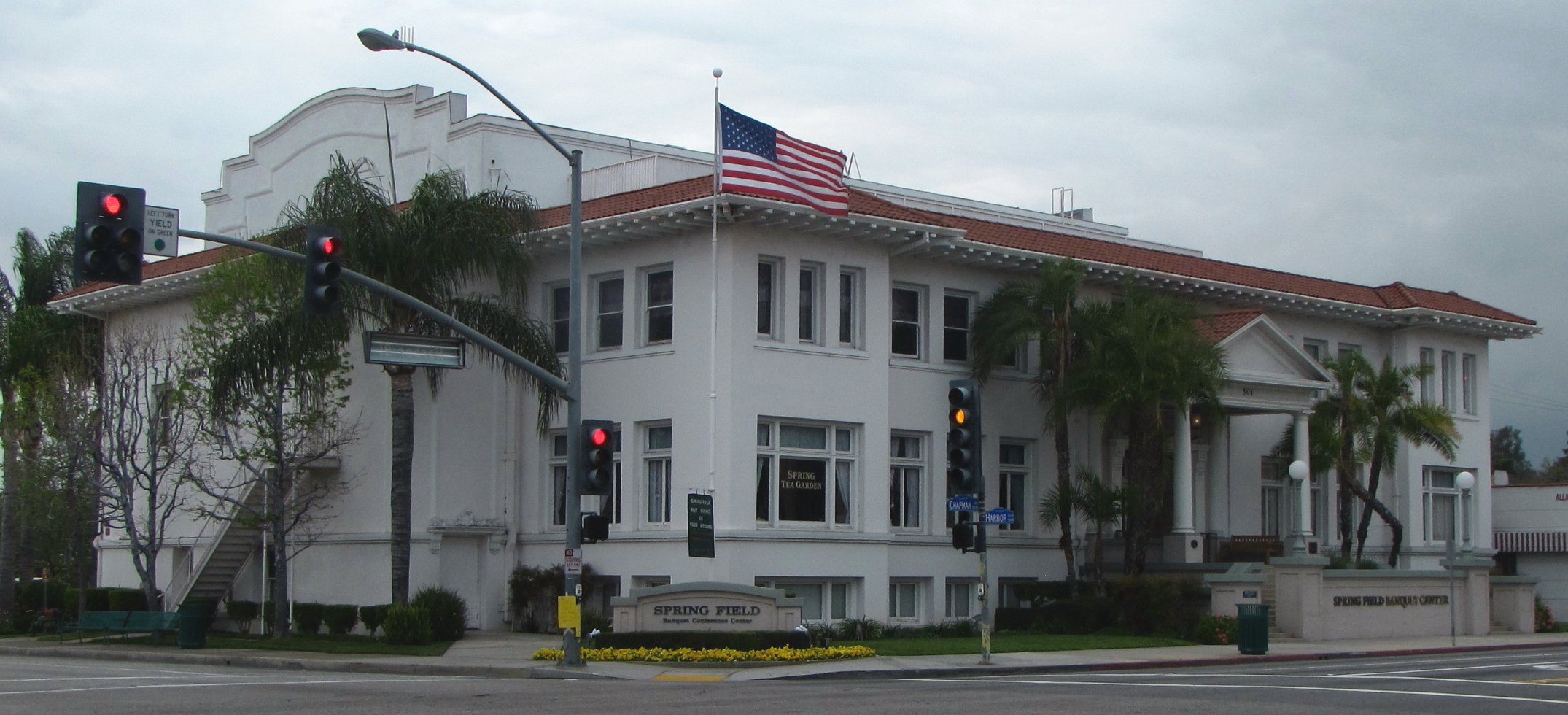

- Location within California Location within the United States
- Location: 501 N. Harbor Blvd., Fullerton, California
- Coordinates: 33°52′27″N 117°55′25″W
- Area: less than one acre
- Architect: Benchley, Frank
- Architectural style: Mission/Spanish Revival
- NRHP reference No.: 95000355
- Added to NRHP: March 31, 1995

The Spring Field Banquet Center in Fullerton, California is a historic building built in Mission/Spanish Revival style. It was listed in the National Register of Historic Places in 1995. Originally constructed in 1920 as a Masonic meeting hall, the Freemasons sold the building in 1993, due to declining membership and funds. The current owner completely rehabilitated the building in 1995. The building now houses the Spring Field Banquet Center, a commercial banquet hall and reception center.

== See also ==
- National Register of Historic Places listings in Orange County, California
