= South Coast Theatre =

Historic former movie theater in Laguna Beach, California

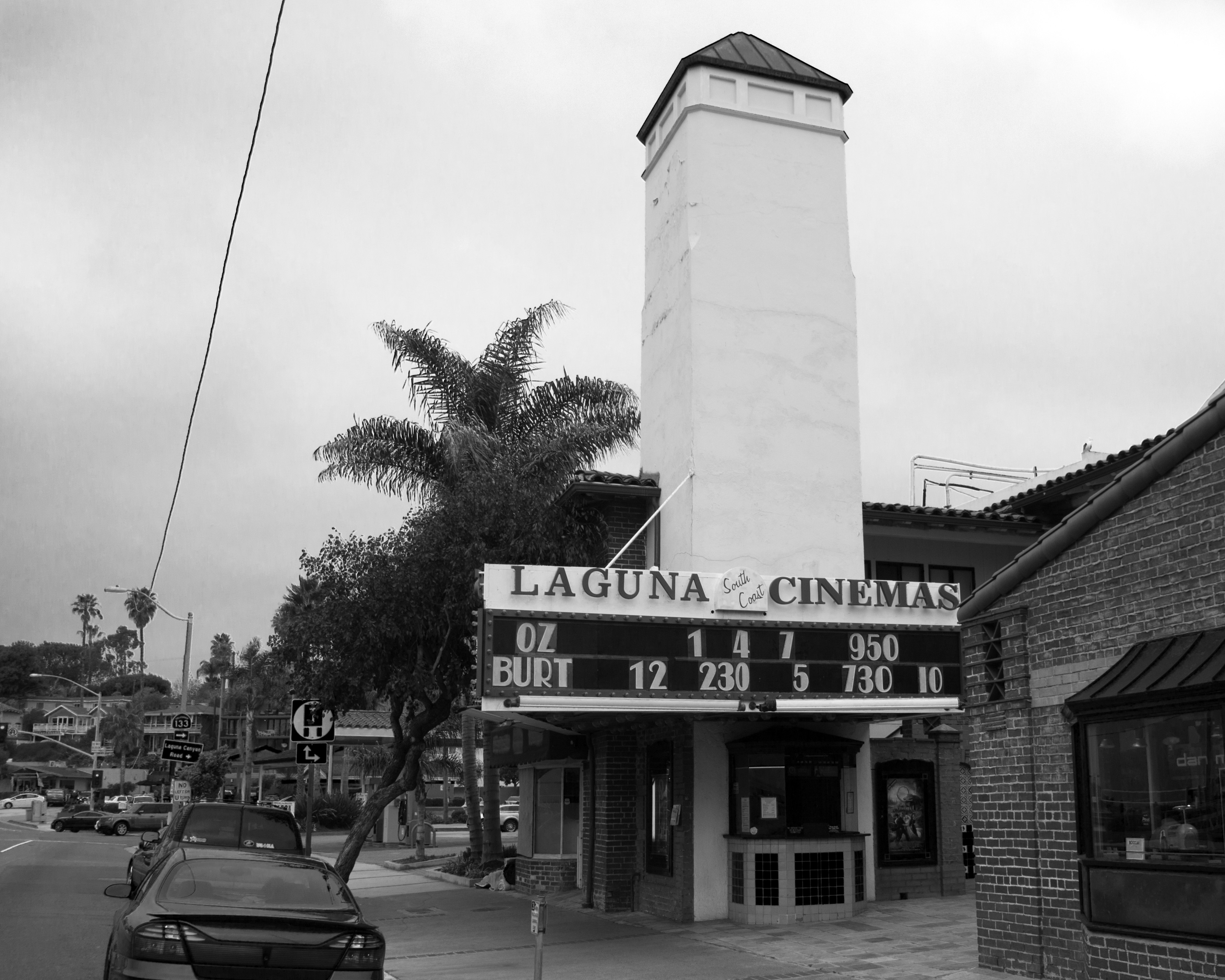
- The theater in 2013
- Interactive map of South Coast Theatre
- Former names: Lynn Theatre (1922-1937); Laguna South Coast Cinemas (1982-2023)
- Address: 162 South Coast Highway; Laguna Beach, California; United States
- Coordinates: 33°32′33″N 117°47′04″W
- Current use: Rivian showroom

Construction
- Opened: 1922; 104 years ago
- Renovated: 1935
- Closed: August 30, 2015; 11 years ago
- Architects: Walter J. Saunders (1922); James Neil Conway (1935)
- New Lynn Theatre
- U.S. National Register of Historic Places
- NRHP reference No.: 100008710
- Added to NRHP: March 10, 2023

The South Coast Theatre is a historic former movie theater on Pacific Coast Highway in Laguna Beach, California, United States. Walter J. Saunders of W. J. Saunders & Son designed the original structure. The theater opened in 1922 as the Lynn Theatre, a replacement for a former venue of the same name. An extensive renovation in 1935 introduced a new Mediterranean Revival style facade designed by James Neil Conway. The theater remained in operation under the founding family until the 1970s when Pacific Theatres acquired it. In 1976, the venue's single auditorium was split into two. Edwards Theatres and Regency Theatres later operated it until its closure in 2015. At the time, it was the only remaining movie theater in Laguna Beach. In 2023, the theater was listed on the National Register of Historic Places and acquired by car manufacturer Rivian to be converted into a showroom.

== History ==
=== 1915–1935: Original two venues ===
The Aufdenkamp family founded and operated the South Coast Theatre. Fred Aufdenkamp was born in 1876 in Hanover, Germany, before immigrating to Nebraska in the 19th century and eventually the Greater Los Angeles region with his family. Aufdenkamp previously operated various entertainment venues, including a hippodrome in Redondo Beach and a makeshift bowling alley in Laguna Beach.

In 1915, Aufdenkamp founded the original Lynn Theatre at 255 Forest Avenue in Laguna Beach, the first movie theater in the city. According to a later account from a former patron, admission was between 5 and 10 cents and the venue hosted approximately three showtimes per week during the summer. Fred's son, Lynndon "Lynn" Aufdenkamp, operated a hand-cranked projector that screened silent films. A generator provided electricity and theatergoers sometimes brought portable stoves for warmth on cold nights.

In 1921, Fred Aufdenkamp announced his plans for a new 500-seat replacement venue that included a second-floor apartment for the family at a cost of US$10,000. The New Lynn Theatre opened in 1922 with a screening of the Robert Z. Leonard silent film Fascination. The New Lynn was dedicated by Mary Pickford and Douglas Fairbanks. The venue also served as a theatre and vaudeville house, staging monthly productions made by the Aufdenkamp family.

On January 11, 1930, a rainstorm flooded Laguna Beach, causing extensive damage to the New Lynn Theatre. The water, which reached as high as four feet, damaged the organ and the woodworking. Theater owner Fred Aufdenkamp later sued the municipal government for its alleged mismanagement of stormwater diversion, seeking $3,700 in damages. The Orange County Superior Court awarded Aufdenkamp $1,300 in the case.

=== 1935–present: Current venue ===
In 1932, Aufdenkamp purchased a lot adjacent to the second Lynn's north side, creating speculation that a third venue could be constructed. In 1934, he moved the second venue to a new location at 240 Ocean Avenue, where it would continue operation as the Lynn Ocean Avenue.

With the original lot cleared, construction began on a larger venue for $50,000. The site would include office space for Southern California Edison and a retail unit. It opened on June 26, 1935, with an early screening of the Lewis Seiler film Ginger. In 1937, it was renamed to the South Coast Theatre and came under new management with the Aufdenkamps retaining ownership of the property.

In 1959, the Lynn Ocean Avenue was demolished, leaving the newer South Coast Theatre as the sole Aufdenkamp operation in town.

Ownership of the venue changed hands for the first time in the 1970s when Pacific Theatres acquired the property. In 1976, the company divided the lone auditorium into two smaller auditoriums. Renovations also included new seats and refurbished bathrooms. In 1982, Edwards Theatres signed a lease to operate the venue, renaming it Laguna South Coast Cinemas.

On August 30, 2015, the theater had its last day of operation with two showings each of the Joel Edgerton film The Gift and the Guy Ritchie film The Man from U.N.C.L.E. The operator at the time, Regency Theatres, said that the outdated technology in the venue made screening films expensive and difficult. At the time of closure, it was the only operating movie theater in Laguna Beach.

On March 10, 2023, the South Coast Theatre was added to the National Register of Historic Places as the New Lynn Theater. The same year, electric vehicle manufacturer Rivian, headquartered in neighboring Irvine, began work on renovating and reopening the theater building as its first car showroom. The space opened on December 8, 2023, and includes a movie screen at the back of the building with programming selected by the Coast Film Foundation.

== Architecture ==
Walter J. Saunders of W. J. Saunders & Son designed the theater, which opened in 1922. The facade was mostly undistinguished with two sets of French doors and balconies on its second floor. Los Angeles–based architect James Neil Conway designed the third and final iteration of the theater, a Mediterranean Revival–style building with a distinctive tower and courtyard. The third building was constructed with concrete, brick, stucco, terra cotta, and ceramic tile.

== See also ==
- National Register of Historic Places listings in Orange County, California
