= Greystone Villa, Cabin 18 =

Historic house in California, United States

- U.S. National Register of Historic Places
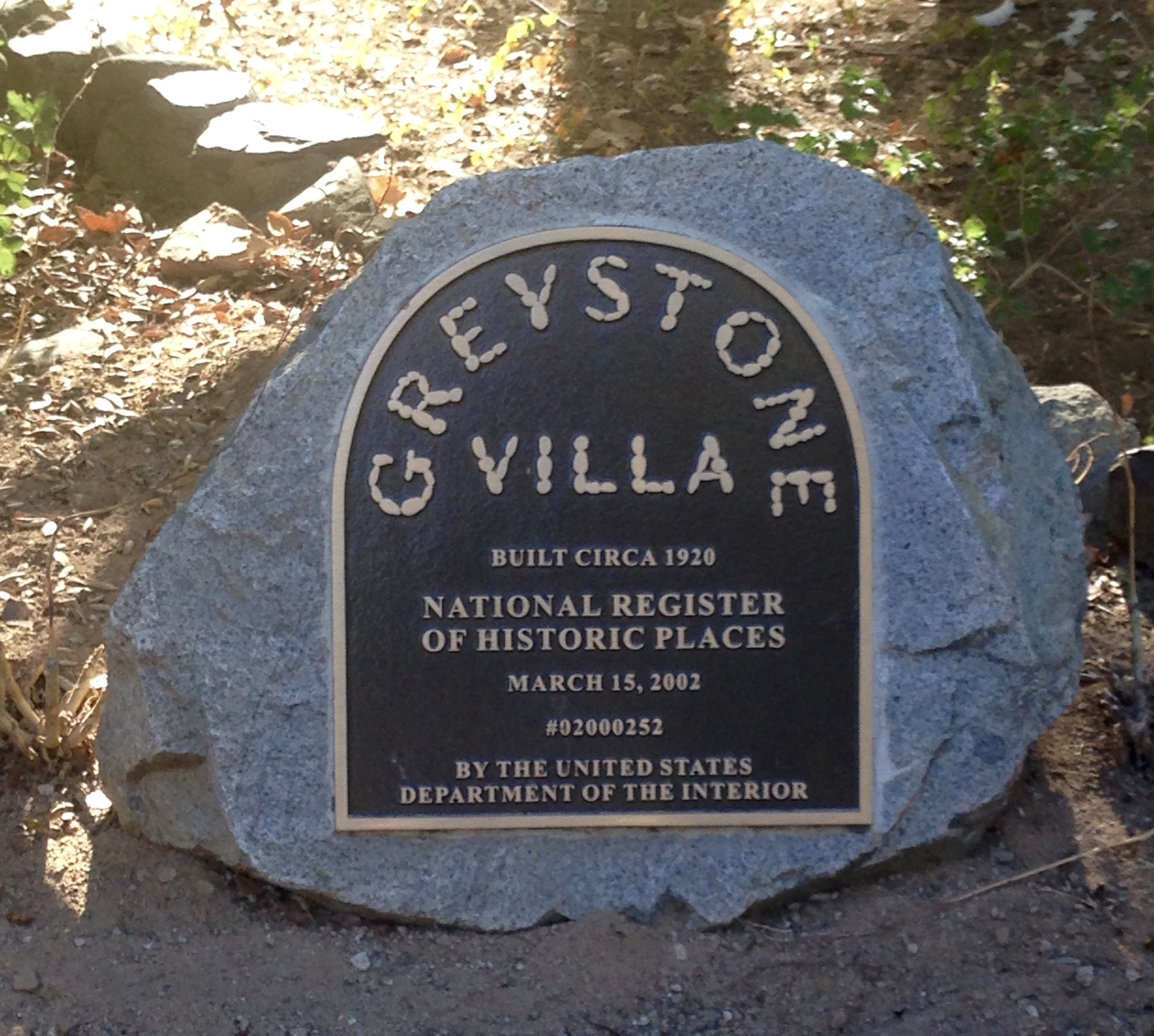
- Plaque naming the Greystone Villa to the NRHP

- Location within California Location within the United States
- Nearest city: Santa Ana Mountains, Cleveland National Forest, Orange County, California
- Coordinates: 33°35′25″N 117°30′15″W
- Area: 0.1 acres (0.040 ha)
- Built by: Franklyn Z. Phillips
- Architectural style: Rustic/Folk Art/Craftsman
- NRHP reference No.: 02000151
- Added to NRHP: March 15, 2002

Greystone Villa, Cabin 18, is a historic building located in the Santa Ana Mountains within Cleveland National Forest, in Orange County, Southern California. It is listed in the National Register of Historic Places.

It is located near Hot Spring Canyon on the Ortega Highway (California Route 74).

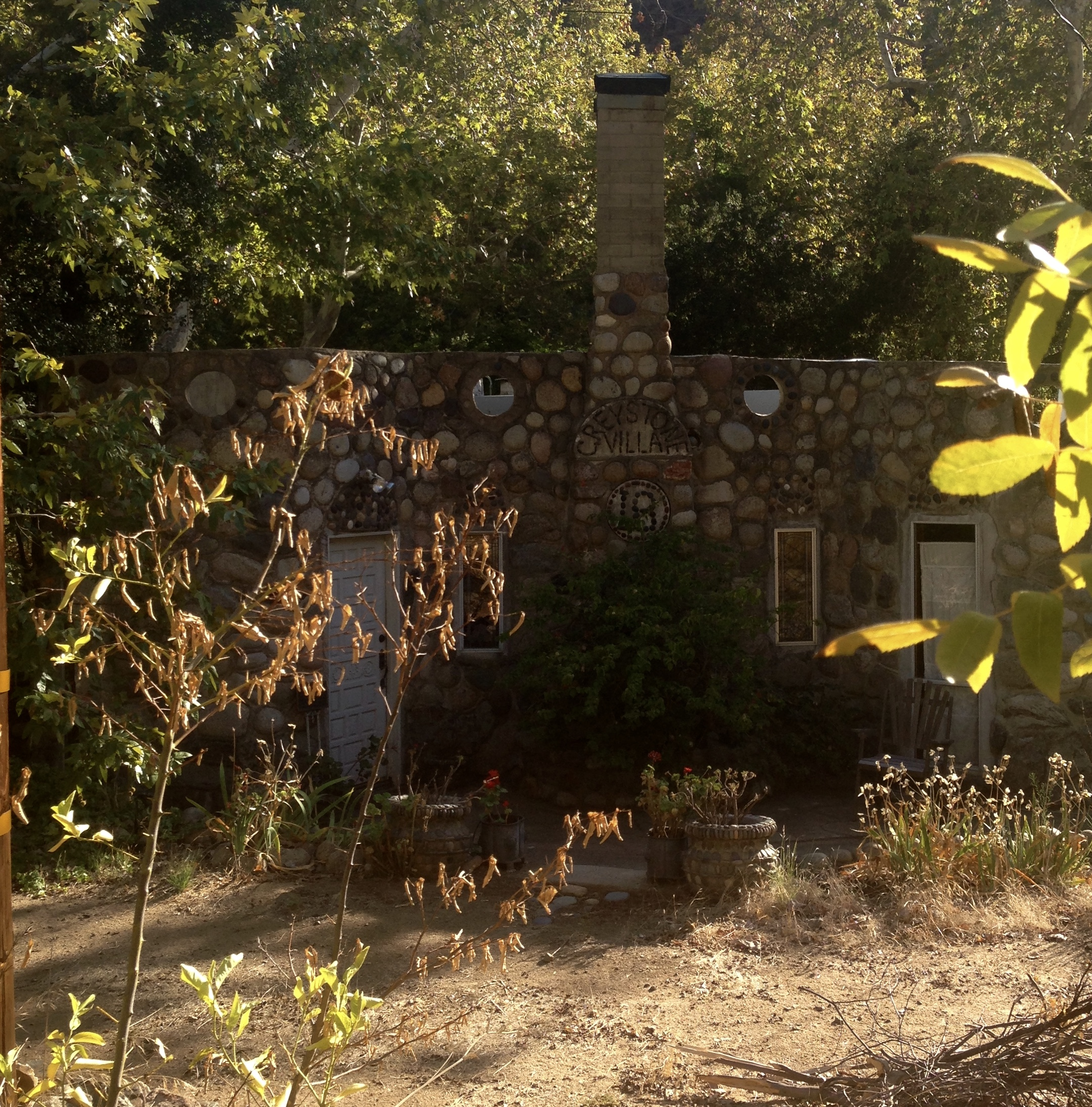
Greystone Villa-Cabin 18

== History ==
The cabin was built between 1929 and 1930 by Frank Z. Phillips, a contractor from Los Angeles. Its NRHP Architectural Classification lists the building under "Rustic/Folk Art/Twentieth Century with Craftsman Features." On Cabin 18, small stones have been used to label the cabin with its number. In addition, the castle inspired stone and mortar structure is a well maintained example of southern Californian rustic vernacular of the early twentieth century.

The collection of cabins built along the Ortega Highway is a result of the Term Occupancy Act, approved by Congress in 1915. The purpose was to encourage residents to build second homes within the boundaries of national forests in order to boost the role of the Forest Service. The homes built at this time utilized natural materials found surrounding the construction sites such as cleared trees and rocks. Large rocks were used in the foundations and walls, while smaller ones decorated the outside walls enhancing the architecture.

According to the National Register of Historic Places, "Having recreation residences on national forests is a significant chapter in the history of federal management of public lands, as well as in the history of outdoor recreation. California was probably the state where the Forest Service first issued permits, and it certainly has become the state where the idea reached fullest expression."

== See also ==
- National Register of Historic Places listings in Orange County, California
