= Phillip Ackley Stanton House =

Historic house in California, United States

- U.S. National Register of Historic Places
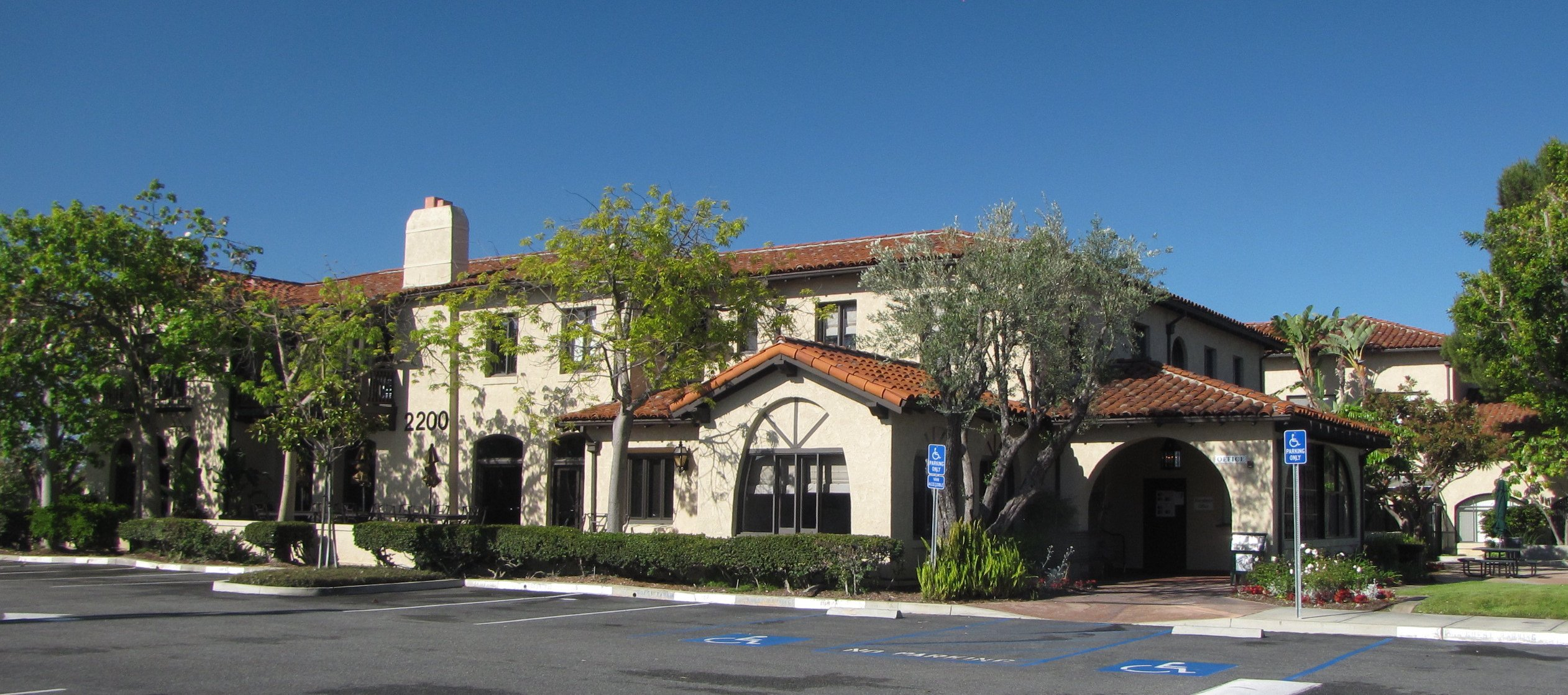

- Location within California Location within the United States
- Location: 2200 W. Sequoia Ave., Anaheim, California
- Coordinates: 33°50′38″N 117°57′33″W
- Area: 0.3 acres (0.12 ha)
- Built: 1928
- Architect: Stanton, Phillip Ackley
- Architectural style: Mission Revival—Spanish Colonial Revival
- NRHP reference No.: 80000828
- Added to NRHP: November 21, 1980

The Phillip Ackley Stanton House is a Mission Revival—Spanish Colonial Revival style house in Anaheim, California, United States. It is now within the Fairmont Preparatory Academy.

The Spanish Colonial hacienda-style house was built in 1929 by Col. Phillip A. Stanton.

Fairmont Middle and High School (later renamed Fairmont Preparatory Academy) opened in September 1994 on the site of the Stanton estate, which includes the Phillip Ackley Stanton House.

The building was listed on the National Register of Historic Places on November 21, 1980.

== See also ==
- National Register of Historic Places listings in Orange County, California
