= A. S. Bradford House =

Historic house in California, United States

- U.S. National Register of Historic Places
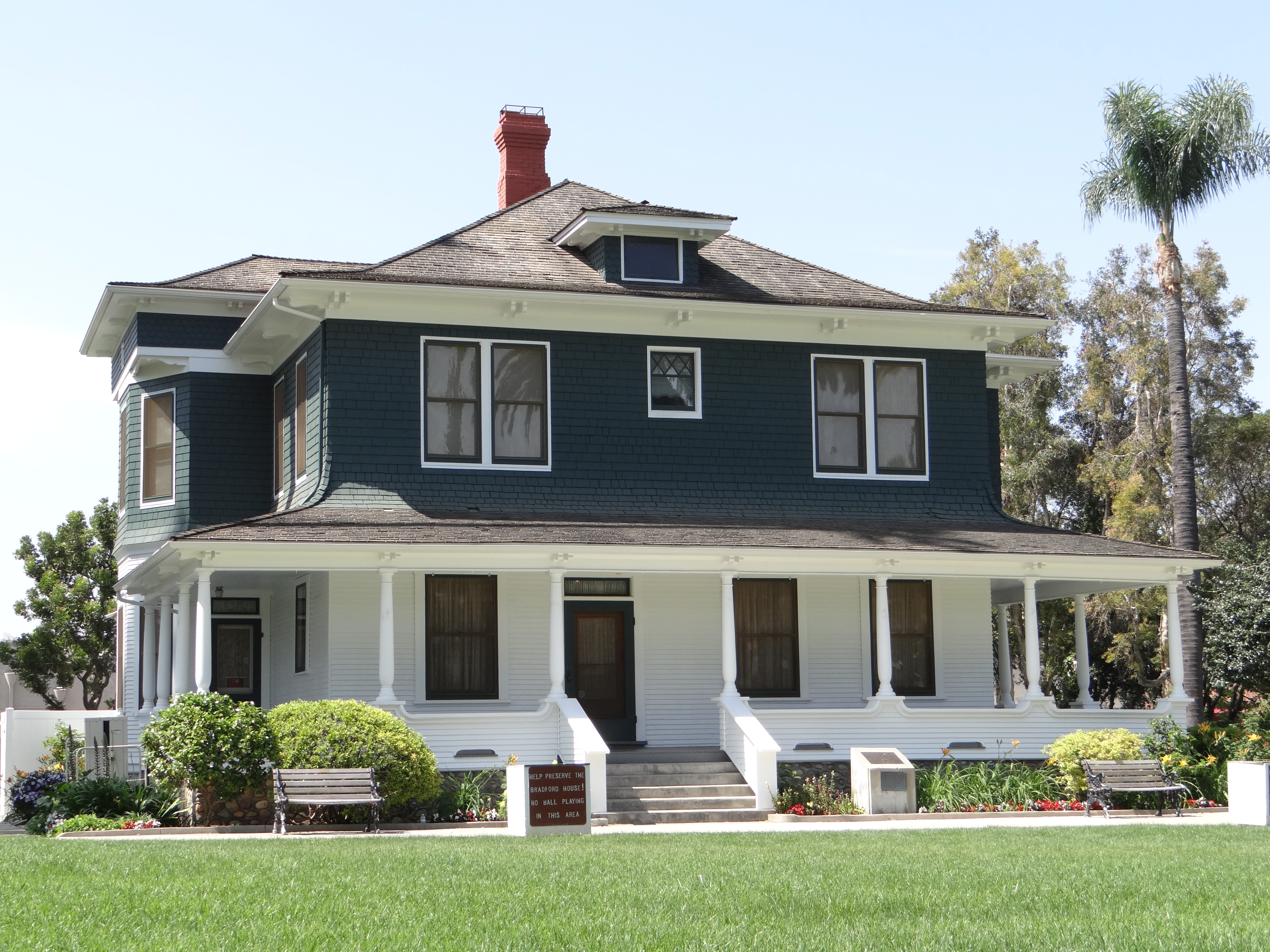
- A. S. Bradford House, May 2012

- Location within California Location within the United States
- Location: 136 Palm Circle, Placentia, California
- Coordinates: 33°53′18″N 117°51′49″W
- Built: 1902
- Architect: James Stafford
- Architectural style: Colonial Revival
- NRHP reference No.: 78000730
- Added to NRHP: October 3, 1978

The A. S. Bradford House, also known as The Bradford House, is a historic home in Placentia, California. It was the home of Albert Sumner Bradford, who founded Placentia by arranging for establishment of a water tank along the railway. Homes and businesses within a one-mile radius could get water.

Designed by James Stafford, the Colonial Revival, 15-room house was built in 1902, in an orange grove.

It was listed on the National Register of Historic Places in 1978, and operated as a house museum at one point.

Albert Sumner Bradford (August 18, 1860—March 30, 1933), originally from Shapleigh, Maine, bought 20 acres land in 1890 in what would become his Tesoro Ranch Placentia. He did much to support growth of the citrus industry.

== See also ==
- National Register of Historic Places listings in Orange County, California
- List of Ranchos of California
