= Roger Y. Williams House =

- Roger Y. Williams House; Swanner House
- U.S. National Register of Historic Places
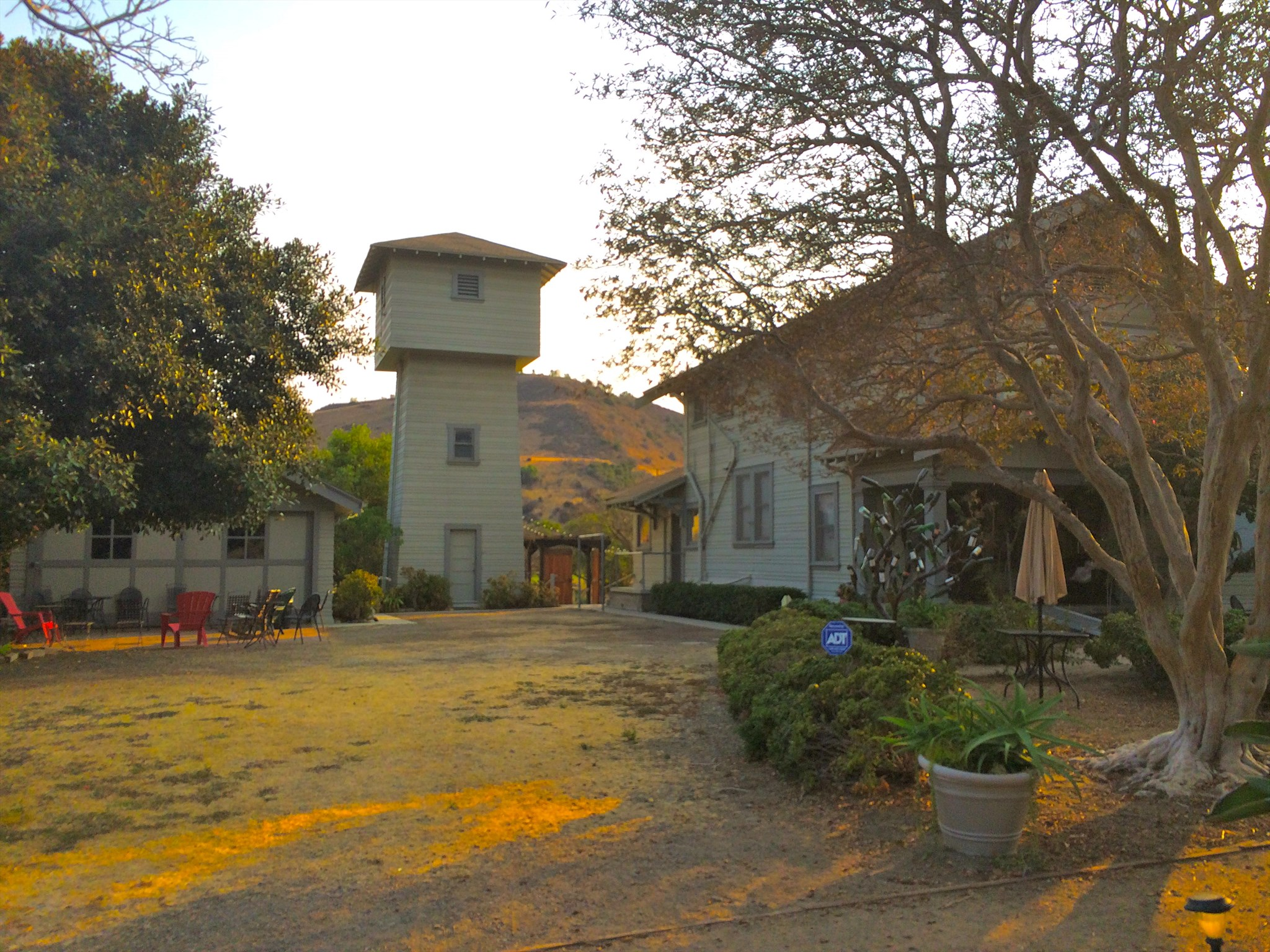

- Location within California
- Location: 29991 Camino Capistrano, San Juan Capistrano, California
- Coordinates: 33°31′43″N 117°40′19″W
- Area: less than one acre
- Built: 1923
- Architectural style: Craftsman
- NRHP reference No.: 06001237
- Added to NRHP: January 10, 2007

The Roger Y. Williams House (also known as the Swanner House) is a home in San Juan Capistrano, California. Built in 1923, it was listed on the National Register of Historic Places in 2007. The listing included two contributing buildings and a contributing structure, plus agricultural fields.

The property includes a two-story Craftsman house, a matching watertower and a matching garage, all built in 1923.
