= C. Z. Culver House =

- U.S. National Register of Historic Places
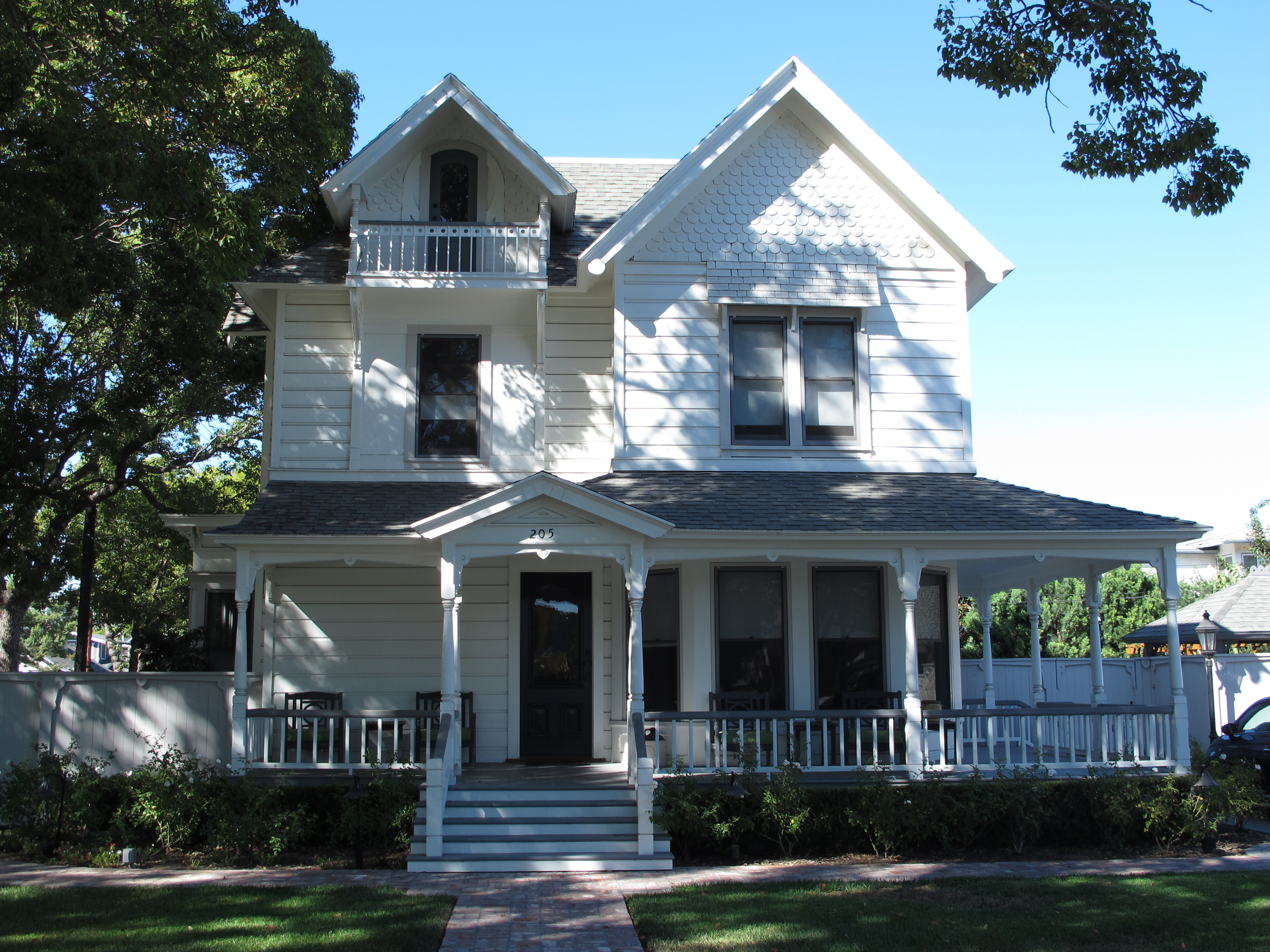
- Queen Anne style entrance facade.

- Location within California Location within the United States
- Location: 205 E. Palmyra, Orange, California
- Coordinates: 33°47′04.00″N 117°51′03.00″W
- Area: 0.1 acres (0.040 ha)
- Built: 1887-1888
- Architectural style: Queen Anne — Victorian architecture
- NRHP reference No.: 86000458
- Added to NRHP: March 20, 1986

The C. Z. Culver House is a historic home within Old Towne Orange, California.

It is part of the Old Towne Historic District. The home is a two-story building, with a large grass filled front yard built in the Victorian architectural style.

A historical marker placed by the United States Department of the Interior is at the south-west corner of the home, or the north-east corner of the intersection of East Palmyra and South Orange Street.

The plaque is to notify visitors that the home was officially placed on the National Register of Historic Places on March 20, 1986. The home is currently unavailable to tour.
