= Richard Egan House =

- U.S. National Register of Historic Places
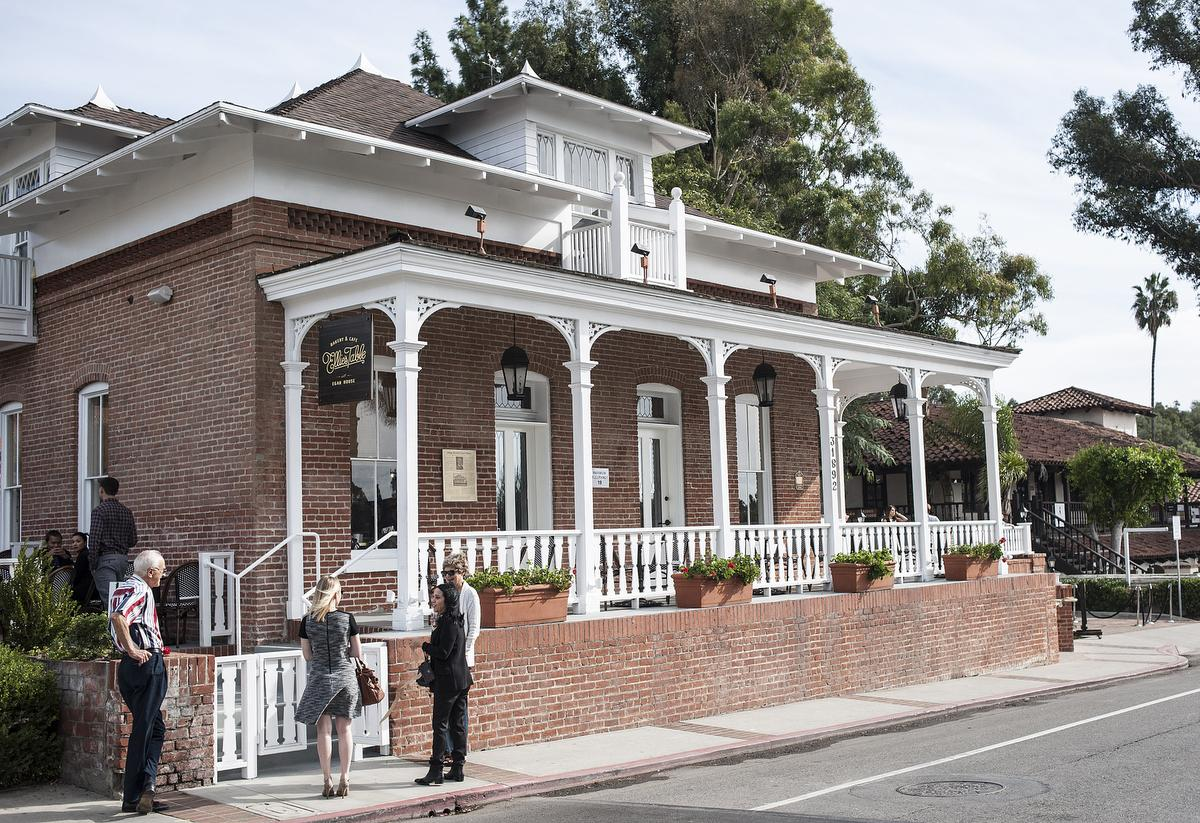
- Richard Egan House in Downtown San Juan Capistrano, California.

- Location within California Location within the United States
- Location: 31829 Camino Capistrano, San Juan Capistrano, California
- Coordinates: 33°30′02.00″N 117°39′45.00″W
- Area: .22 acres (0.089 ha)
- Built: 1883 or 1898
- Architectural style: Victorian Architecture
- NRHP reference No.: 100000460
- Added to NRHP: January 17, 2017

The Richard Egan House, also known as Egan House or Judge Richard Egan House, is a historic home located in downtown San Juan Capistrano, California. It was listed on the National Register of Historic Places in 2017.

== Overview ==
=== Construction ===
It was built by San Juan Capistrano contractor William English in 1883 for Richard Egan. It is the only Renaissance Revival-style house in San Juan Capistrano.

It was designed and constructed by Richard Egan who later became the city's judge. Egan, born in Ireland and studied in New York fell in love with San Juan Capistrano and decided to settle down and build a home.

=== History ===
The house is a one-story structure built originally built in 1883. The upper part of the building was destroyed by fire in 1897, and the current home was rebuilt in 1898. It has classic Victorian Architecture with brick walls and a white wooden patio porch. The building once served as courtroom for the town until Egan's death in 1923.

=== Present day ===
Since 2017, the building is home to Ellie's Table. The bakery is an independent breakfast restaurant with a few other locations within southern Orange County. Inside the building are many artifacts from the town's late 19th and early 20th century history. Outside the building, facing west, are three historical markers. One indicating the property is listed on the National Register, another indicating it is a San Juan Capistrano historic site, and one with a few paragraphs of information regarding Richard Egan and his home.
