= Santa Ana Fire Station Headquarters No. 1 =

- U.S. National Register of Historic Places
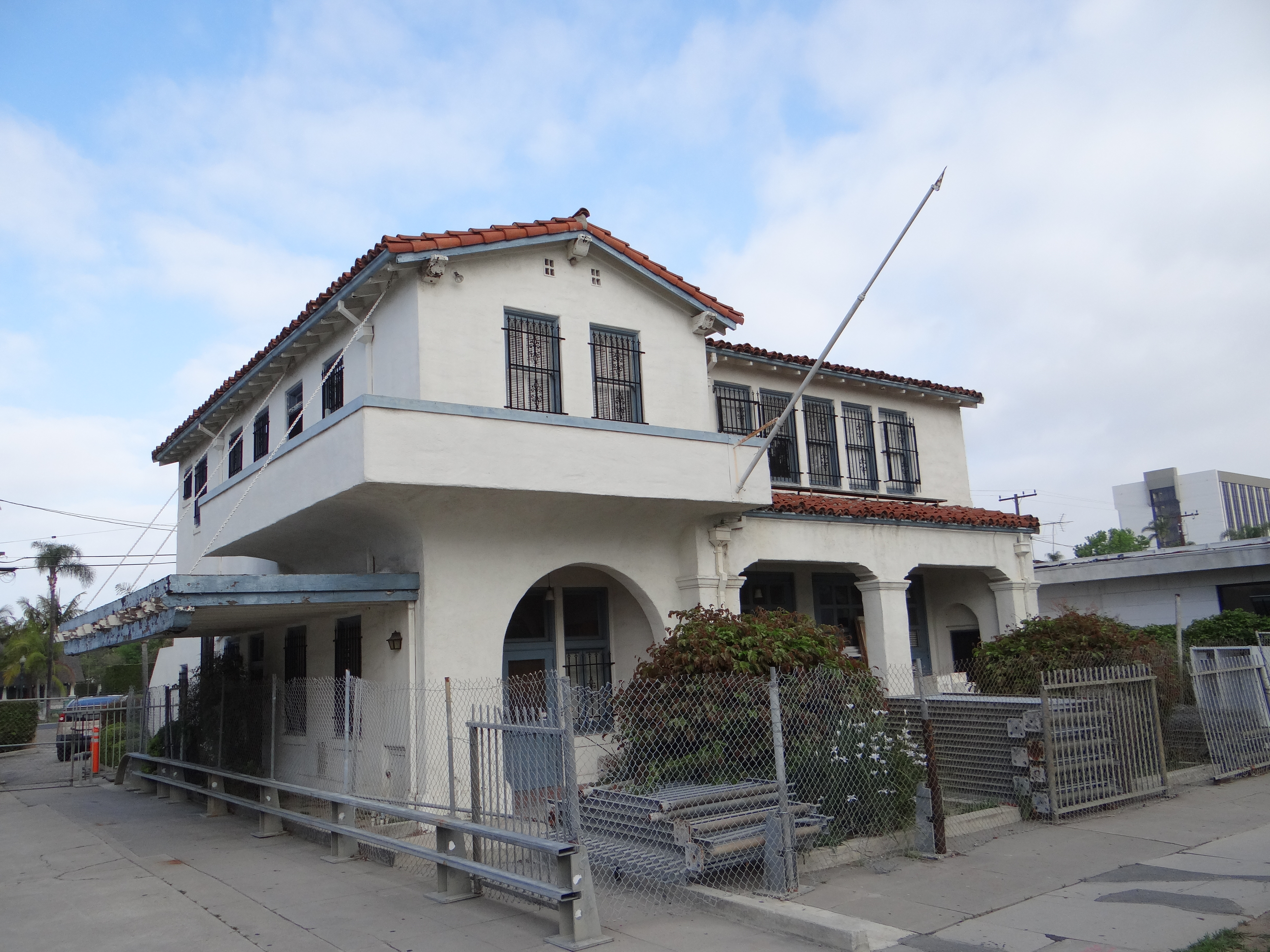

- Location within California
- Location: 1322 N. Sycamore St., Santa Ana, California
- Coordinates: 33°45′23″N 117°52′05″W
- Area: 0.1 acres (0.040 ha)
- Built: 1929
- Architect: Frederick Eley
- Architectural style: Mission/spanish Revival
- NRHP reference No.: 86001549
- Added to NRHP: July 10, 1986

Santa Ana Fire Station Headquarters No. 1, at 1322 N. Sycamore St. in Santa Ana, California, is a fire station which was built in 1929. It was listed on the National Register of Historic Places in 1986.

It was designed by Santa Ana architect Frederick Eley. It is a two-story Spanish Colonial Revival-style, stuccoed building.
