= Fairmont Preparatory Academy =

Location
- Anaheim, California; 33°50′38″N 117°57′36″W

Information
- Type: Private
- Motto: Inspiring minds. Empowering dreams
- Established: 1953
- School district: Anaheim, California
- Grades: 9-12
- Enrollment: approximately 650
- Website: www.fairmontschools.com/preparatory-academy

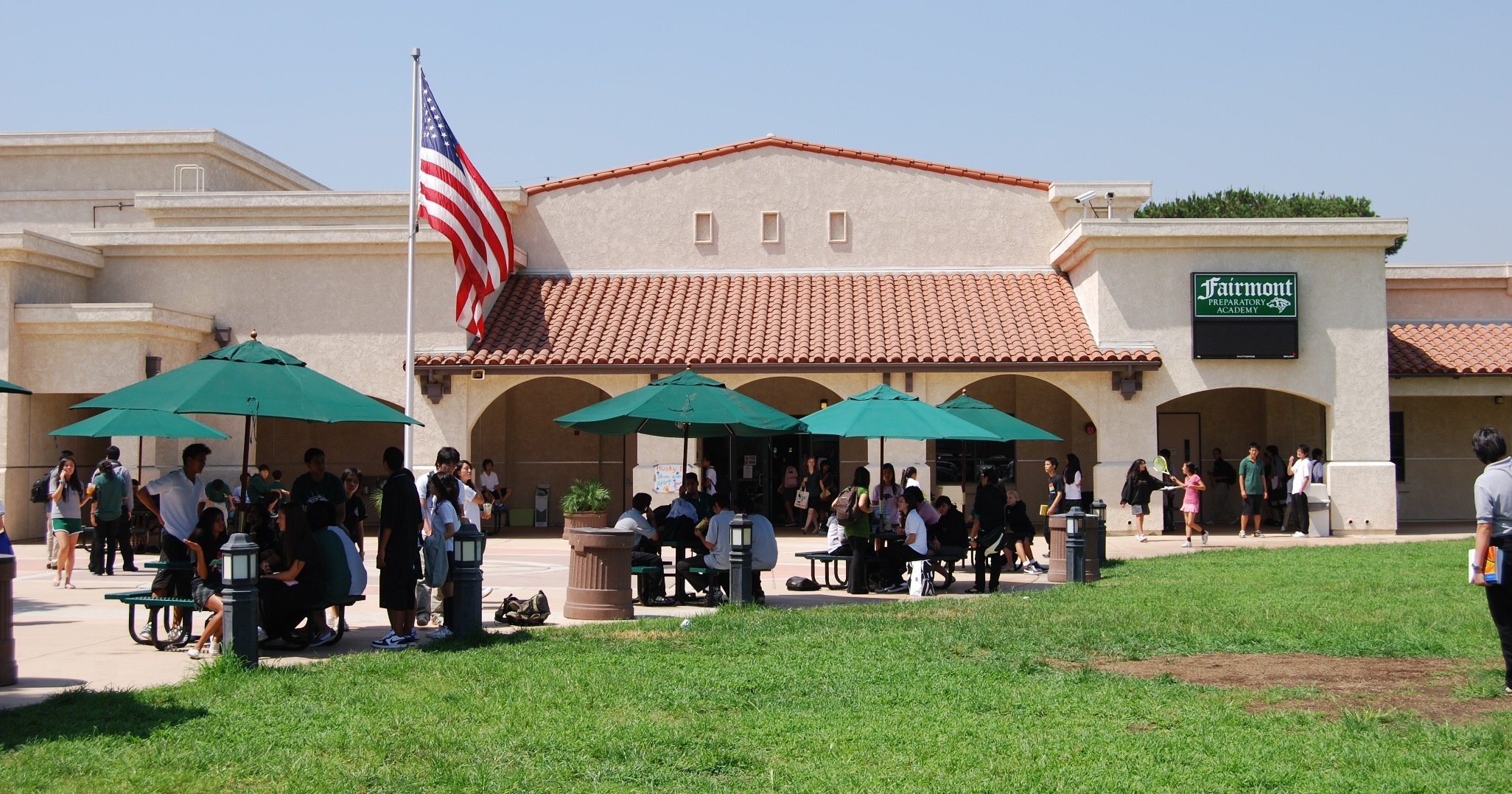
The front of Fairmont Preparatory Academy during session.

Fairmont Preparatory Academy is a private college preparatory high school located in Anaheim, California. It is one of the campuses of the Fairmont Private Schools system. It has been an IB World School since August 1995.

== Awards and recognition ==
For the 1990-91 school year, Fairmont Private Junior High School was recognized with the Blue Ribbon Award from the United States Department of Education, the highest honor that an American school can achieve. School officials were presented with a Blue Ribbon School of Excellence award at a White House event held on March 25, 1991, at a ceremony hosted by President of the United States George H. W. Bush and United States Secretary of Education Lamar Alexander.

In 2008, the College Board recognized Fairmont Preparatory Academy as having one of the strongest Advanced Placement calculus programs in California.

== History ==
Fairmont Middle and High School (later renamed Fairmont Preparatory Academy) opened for the 1993-1994 school year on the site of the Stanton estate, which includes a hacienda-style house built in 1929 by Col. Philip A. Stanton. The Phillip Ackley Stanton House building was entered into the National Register of Historic Places on November 21, 1980.

== Class sizes ==
Fairmont Preparatory Academy has comparatively small class sizes. For example, its Anaheim, CA campus has a student/teacher ratio of 13.26.

== Fairmont Private Schools ==
Founded in 1953, Fairmont Private Schools is the largest and oldest non-sectarian private school in Orange County. The Fairmont Schools consists of five campuses: Fairmont Preparatory Academy (9 - 12th grade), Anaheim Hills (pre-kindergarten - 8th grade), North Tustin (pre-kindergarten - 8th grade), Historic Anaheim (preschool - 8th grade), and San Juan Capistrano (preschool - 8th grade) which together aim to teach a consistent program from preschool through 12th grade.

== Images ==
The courtyard inside the school.

The school gym.
