= Cypress Street Schoolhouse =

- U.S. National Register of Historic Places
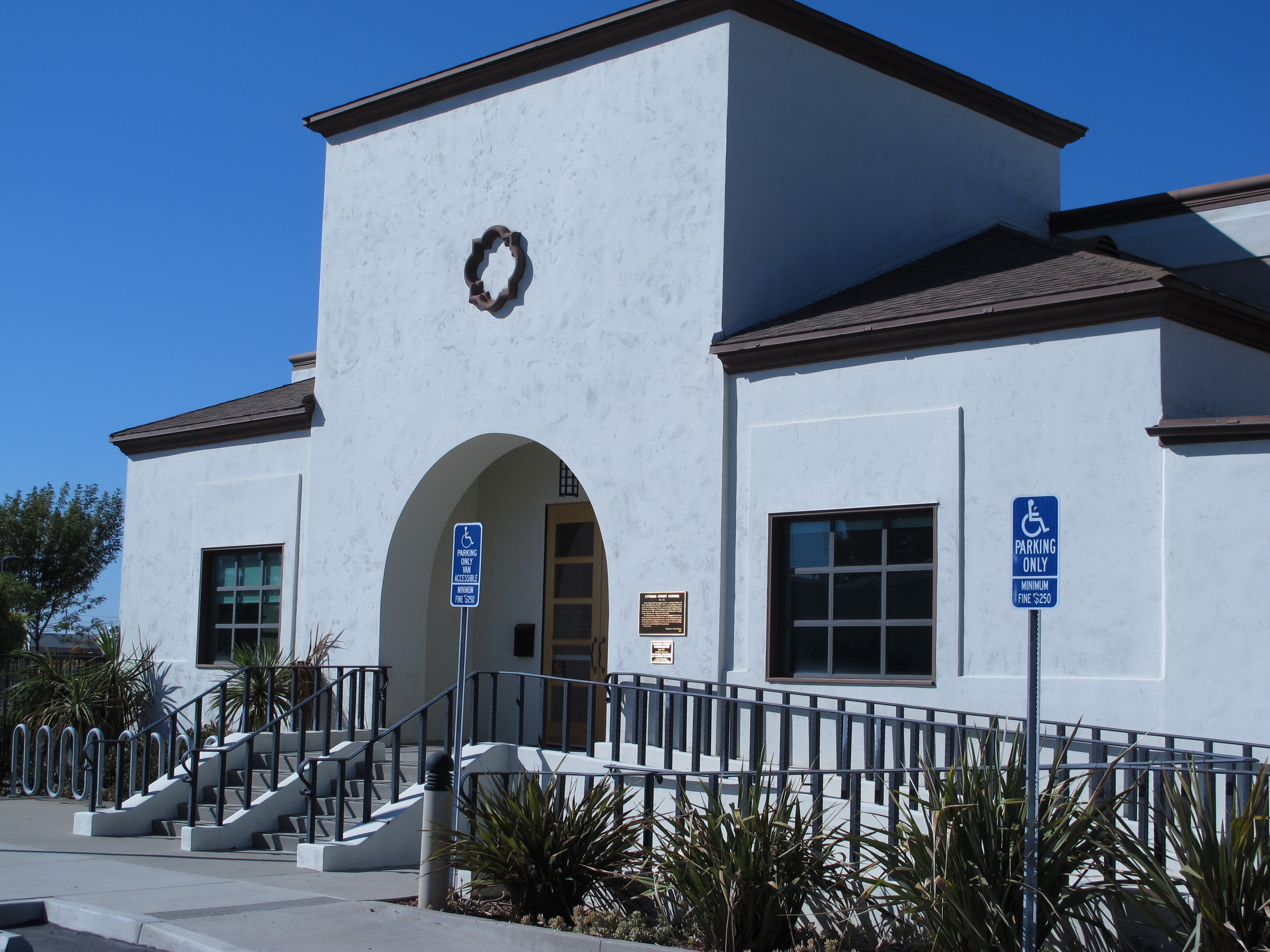
- Cypress Street Schoolhouse

- Location within California Location within the United States
- Location: 544 N. Cypress St., Orange, California
- Coordinates: 33°47′04.00″N 117°51′03.00″W
- Area: 0.1 acres (0.040 ha)
- Built: 1931
- Architectural style: Spanish Colonial Revival
- NRHP reference No.: 15000380
- Added to NRHP: July 7, 2015

The Cypress Street Schoolhouse, also known simply as Cypress Schoolhouse, is a historic former elementary school building in Orange, California built in 1931. It is a one story structure built in classic Spanish Colonial Revival architecture with stucco walls and a clay tile roof. The building hosted educational classes ranging from kindergarten to fifth grade. It is one of the last remaining public school buildings in Southern California that was used as a segregated school for Mexican American students. The school officially closed in 1944, just three years shy of the landmark California Supreme Court decision Mendez, et al v. Westminster School District which desegregated public schools in California. The school house is owned by Chapman University. Cypress Street Schoolhouse was added to the National Register of Historic Places on July 7, 2015.
