= Esslinger Building =

- U.S. National Register of Historic Places
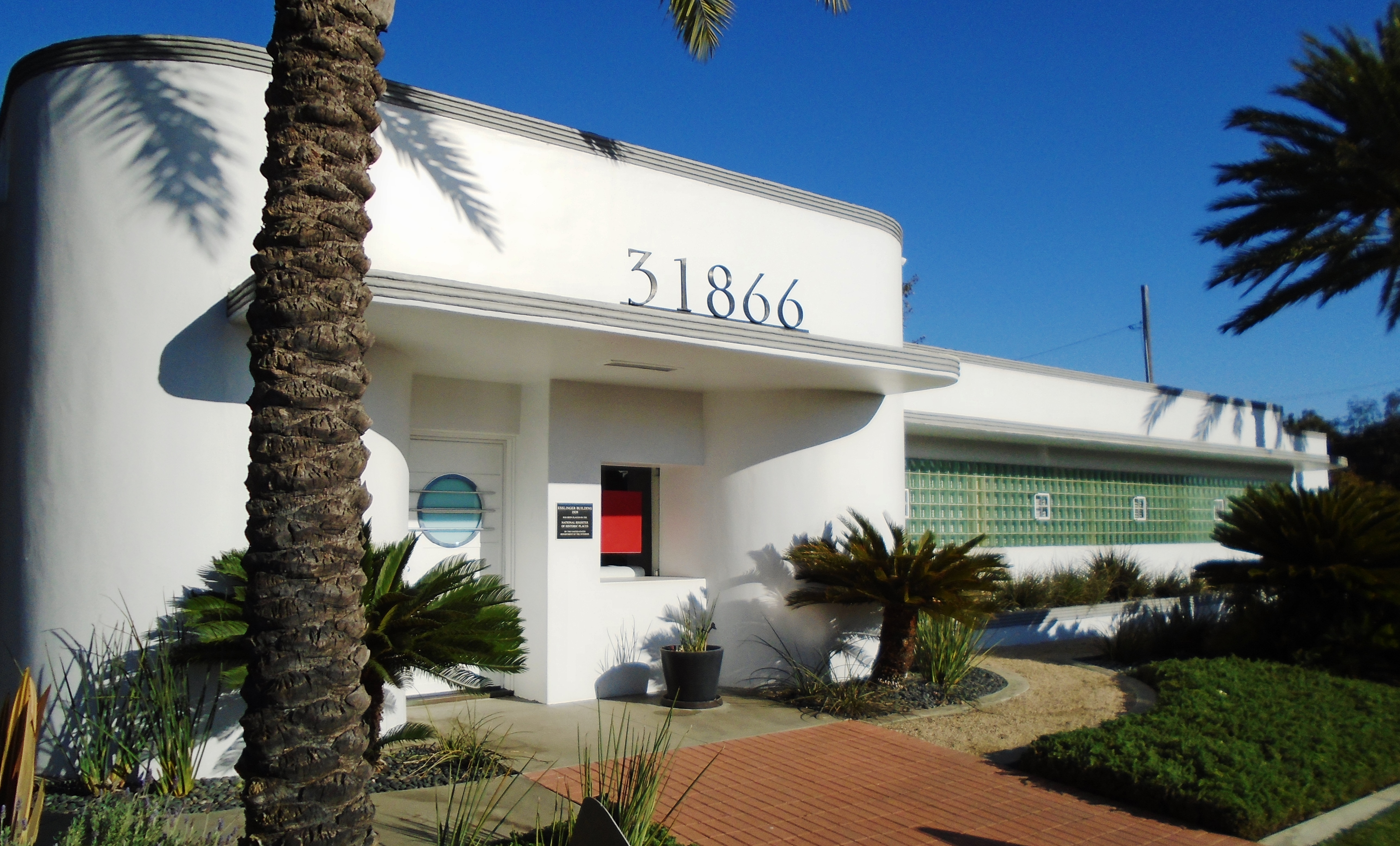
- (2019)

- Location within California
- Location: 31866 Camino Capistrano, San Juan Capistrano, California
- Coordinates: 33°30′00″N 117°39′40″W
- Area: less than one acre
- Built: 1938
- Architect: Alexander Law
- Architectural style: Moderne, Streamline
- NRHP reference No.: 88000557
- Added to NRHP: May 16, 1988

The Esslinger Building, at 31866 Camino Capistrano in San Juan Capistrano, California, was built in 1938. It was listed on the National Register of Historic Places in 1988.

It is a one-story streamline moderne style office building. It was designed by the architect Alexander Law for Dr. Paul H. Esslinger to serve as a medical clinic. A second contributing building is a garage behind, with an upstairs apartment unit, which was connected to the main building by a roof added in 1982.
