= Hugh Edgar Johnson House =

- U.S. National Register of Historic Places
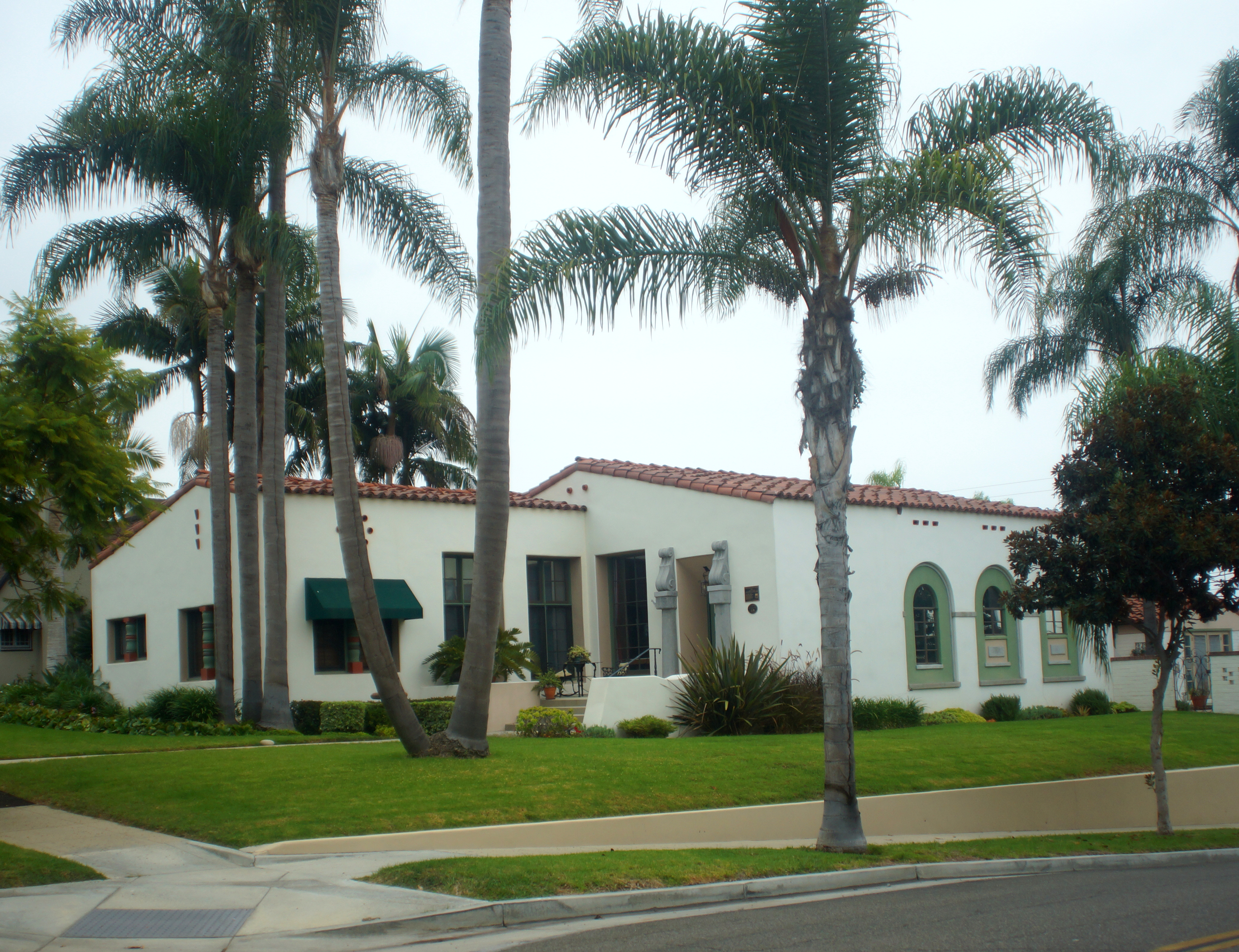
- Hugh Edgar Johnson House
- Location: 444 W. Brookdale Place Fullerton, California
- Built: 1928
- Architectural style: Spanish Colonial Revival
- NRHP reference No.: 100006089
- Added to NRHP: February 4, 2021

The Hugh Edgar Johnson House is a Spanish Colonial Revival style home in Fullerton, California. It was built for newspaper editor Hugh Edgar Johnson by Evan J. Herbert in 1928. The home was listed on the National Register of Historic Places on February 4, 2021.
