= Odd Fellows Hall (Santa Ana, California) =

- U.S. National Register of Historic Places
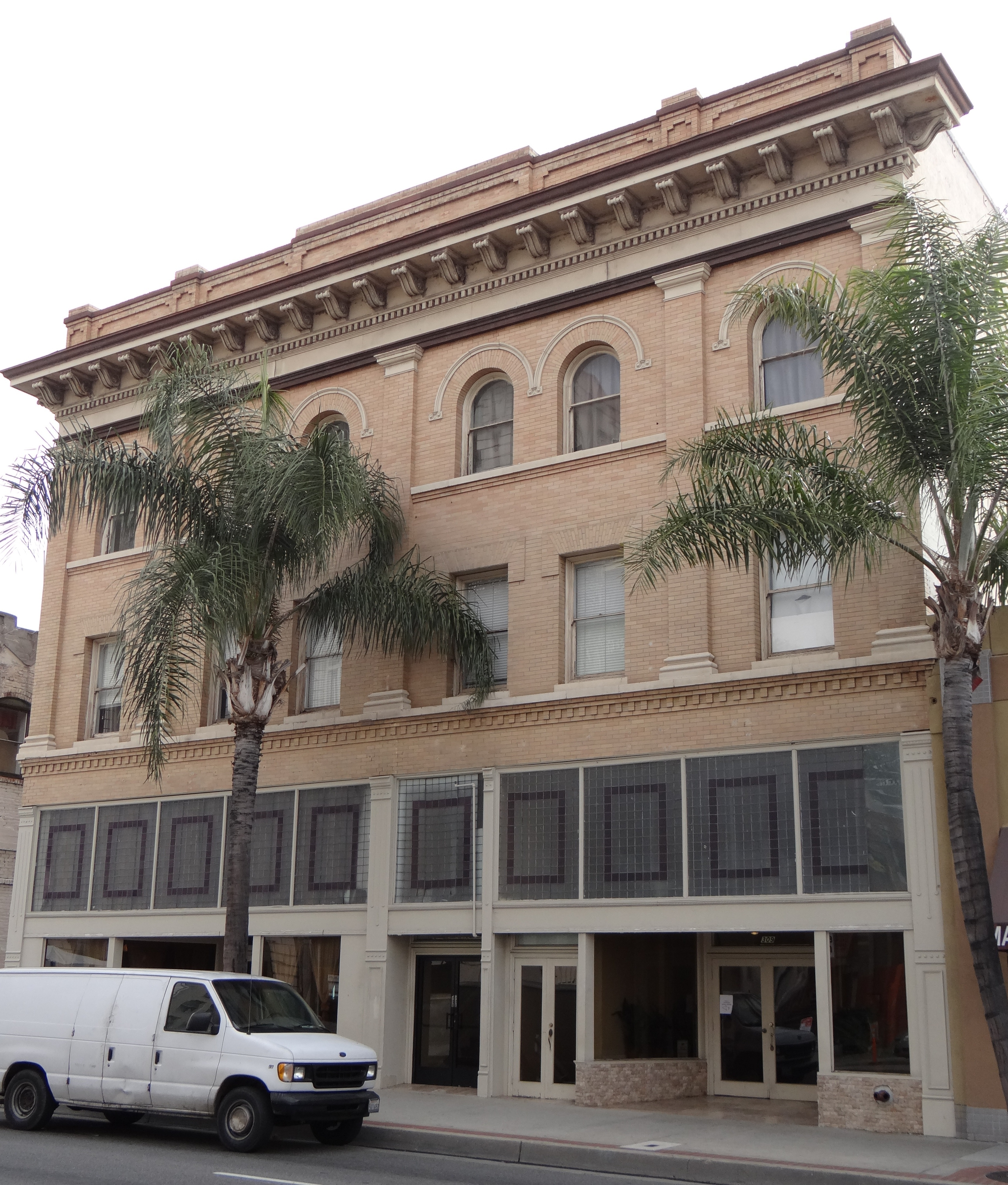

- Location within California Location within the United States
- Location: 309-311 N. Main St., Santa Ana, California
- Coordinates: 33°44′51″N 117°51′59″W
- Area: 0.2 acres (0.081 ha)
- Built: 1906
- Architect: Funk & Bird; Bradshaw, C. B.
- NRHP reference No.: 83001218
- Added to NRHP: August 18, 1983

The Odd Fellows Hall in Santa Ana, California, United States, also known as Odd Fellows Building, was built in 1906. It has served both as a clubhouse and as a commercial building.

It was built by the Santa Ana Lodge No. 236, Independent Order of Odd Fellows. The Santa Ana Register, which became the Orange County Register, was the first tenant, on in its ground floor, and stayed until moving to larger quarters in 1913.

In 1982, before a planned rehabilitation of the building, all of the "elaborate classical woodwork" in the Odd Fellows' lodge room on the second floor had survived and the building was one of the last remaining Late Victorian commercial buildings in the city.

It was listed on the National Register of Historic Places in 1983.

Its NRHP nomination states: "The Odd Fellows' building is a fine building with much character and fine architectural design, unique in Santa Ana's large commercial district."
