= SQR (disambiguation) =

SQR may refer to:

== Biochemistry ==
- Succinate-Q reductase, an enzyme complex
- sulfide:quinone oxidorreductase pathway, see Microbial oxidation of sulfur

== Computing ==
- SQR, a programming language
- SQR codes, Secure Quick Response codes

== Linguistics ==
- Siculo-Arabic (ISO 639 language code: sqr)
- Smiting-blade symbol (hieroglyph)

== Mathematics ==
- square (algebra) (sqr, sq)
- square root (sqr, sqrt)

== Transportation ==
- Soroako Airport (IATA airport code SQR) Soroako, South Sulawesi, Indonesia
- Alsaqer Aviation (ICAO airline code SQR) defunct Libyan airline, see List of airline codes (A)
- Sultanpur Lodi (Indian rail code SQR), see List of railway stations in India

== Other uses ==
- The SQR Store, originally "S.Q.R.", department store in Anaheim, California, 1907–1978

== See also ==
- Square (disambiguation)
