= Disneyland feral cats =

A feral cat at Disneyland

A population of approximately 200 feral cats exist at the Disneyland Resort in Anaheim, California. The cats, which are used for pest control and sometimes adopted by employees, have garnered a significant fanbase. Although some are also known to exist in the Walt Disney World resort in Orlando, Florida, a comparable population is not known to reside there.
