= Downtown Anaheim =

- Neighborhood
- Location within Anaheim and Northern Orange County Location within California
- Coordinates: 33.833914°N 117.915446°W
- Country: United States
- State: California
- County: Orange
- City: Anaheim

Downtown Anaheim, also known as Anaheim Colony Historic District, and as Anaheim Historic Center, is a neighborhood that serves as the administrative and historic center of the city of Anaheim, California. It is delimited by East, West, North, and South streets, and the main roads within it are Anaheim Boulevard (formerly named Los Angeles Street), and Center Street.

== Buildings and attractions ==
Some of the structures that stand out in Anaheim's downtown skyline are the Bank of America and Wells Fargo buildings, which are both over ten stories high. Other high-rise buildings in Downtown Anaheim include City Hall, West City Hall, the AT&T Building, the Anaheim Memorial Manor, and the Kraemer Building. The Anaheim Police Department's headquarters, Anaheim's public Central Library, and the Anaheim Chamber of Commerce are also located in the downtown area.

Downtown Anaheim's Farmers Market can be found alongside other retail and dining establishments along Center Street Promenade. Other attractions in or around the downtown area include: the Mother Colony House, the oldest museum in Orange County; Anaheim's "Art in Public Places" Artwalk; the Muzeo museum (hosted in the old building of Carnegie Library), which opened in the Fall of 2007; the Anaheim Packing House, which is a gourmet food hall that opened in 2014 in a former Sunkist packing house; Anaheim Ice, an ice skating rink open to the public that also serves as the practice arena for the NHL professional hockey team, the Anaheim Ducks; Pearson Park, named after former mayor Charles Pearson; the Pearson Park Amphitheatre, an outdoor theater; and Anaheim's History Walk, which was unveiled on June 20, 2007.

== History ==
=== Central business district ===
When Anaheim was a rural community surrounded by orange groves, the geographic center of town was at the intersection of Center Street and Los Angeles Street (now Center Street and Anaheim Blvd.) and the central business district was built around the center of town anchored by the likes of the SQR Department Store, Chung King Restaurant, and Pickwick Hotel.

==== Major businesses ====
- The SQR Store became Anaheim's major department store and operated from 1907–1978.
  - Its first location was at the northeast corner of Center and Los Angeles. Charles "Sam" Federman operated a store here since 1883 and in 1907 messrs. Schumacher, Quenton and Renner bought it, changing its name to "The S. Q. R. Store" after their initials.
  - In 1913, it moved to a new building at the southwest corner replacing the building where the Ahlborn & Raymond department store had operated and Stern Bros. before that.
  - In 1926, SQR built a new store at the SW corner of Center and Lemon, where it would operate until the late 1970s.
- The Falkenstein department store was located in the Mitchell block at the northwest corner of Center and Los Angeles, which moved to new quarters at the new Casou Building in 1916, which replaced the oldest building in town at that time, the Langenberger adobe.
- J. C. Penney opened in 1920 at the Roberts Building, 225 W. Center, moved in 1923 to a new store at 236 W. Center, and again on July 11, 1934, reopening in a space twice the size in the former Falkenstein's at 124 W. Center, closing in 1961 after having opened suburban locations nearby, such as at Buena Park Mall.
- F. W. Woolworth variety stores moved into the new Mitchell Building at the northwest corner of Center and Los Angeles in 1917.

==== Major hotels ====
- Pickwick Hotel (orig. El Torre Hotel), 225 S. Los Angeles Av. (Anaheim Bl.) opened December 6, 1926, Spanish Colonial Revival architecture, architect M. Eugene Durfee NHRP listed, yet demolished 1978
- Planters Hotel, burned down in 1890 and not rebuilt
- Commercial Hotel, site of Valencia Hotel, SE corner Center and Lemon
- Valencia Hotel, 182 W. Center SE corner of Lemon

==== Other major commercial buildings ====
- Anaheim Theatre, orig. Fairyland Theatre (cinema), opened 1917, M. Eugene Durfee, architect, 1933 bought by Fox West Coast Theatres and renamed "Anaheim Theatre", closed 1951, later operated as Pussycat Theaters (adult films), closed 1983, demolished
- Samuel Kraemer Building, 76 S. Claudina, NE corner of Center, 1924 M. Eugene Durfee, architect, Renaissance Revival architecture, still standing

==== Major civic buildings ====
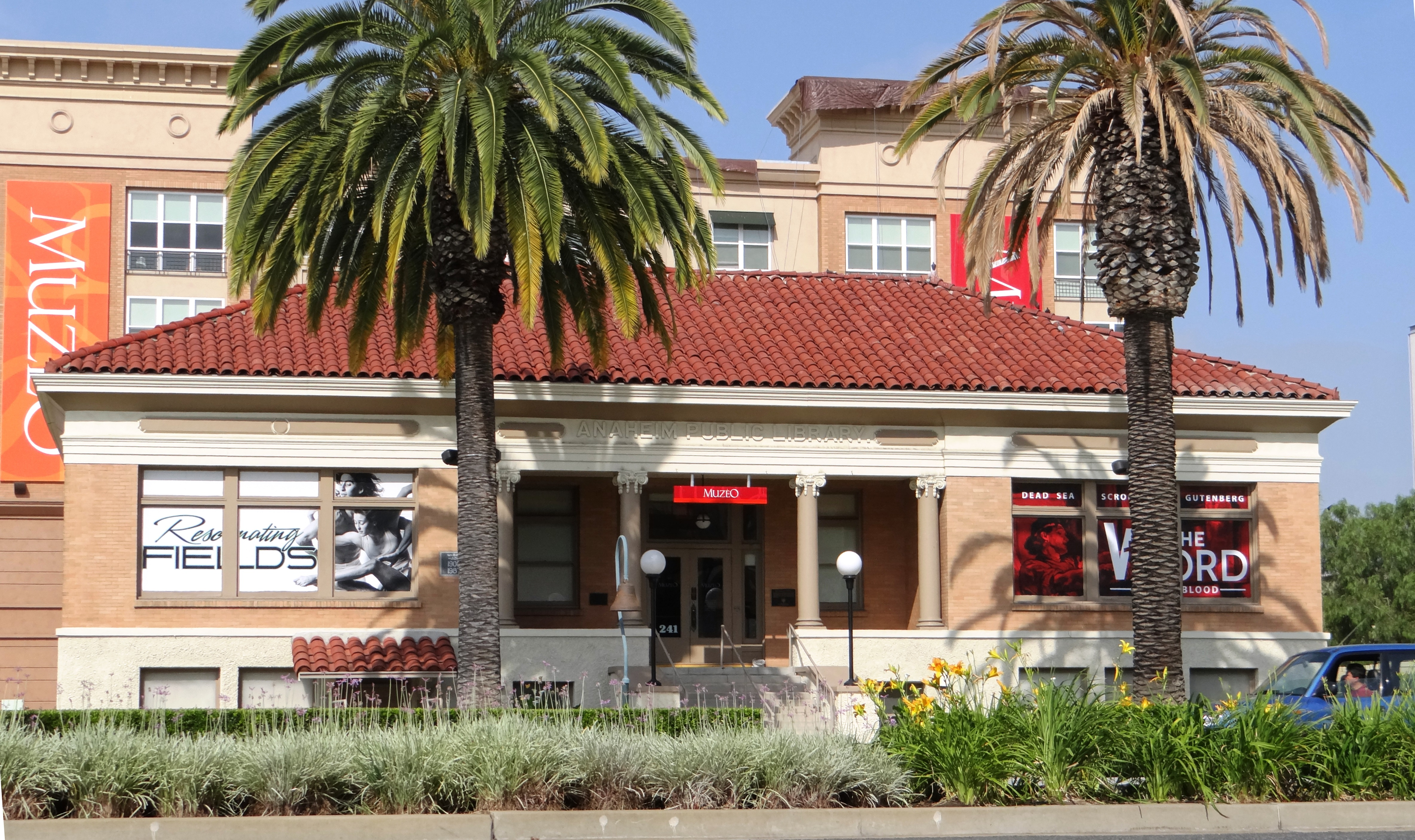
Former Carnegie Library, now Muzeo

- First school, E. Chartres at Emily, b. 1879, demolished to build George Washington School on site.
- Third City Hall, 204 E. Center at Claudina, 1923–1980, demolished
- Carnegie Library (former Anaheim Public Library), 241 S. Los Angeles, NW corner of Broadway, now MUZEO museum

=== Decline and destruction of historic downtown ===
Disneyland brought the need for expansion of the Heart of Anaheim. Prior to Walt Disney's death in 1966, the city of Anaheim had plans to construct a forty-story office tower on the other side of Ball Road from Disneyland. Walt Disney knew that the skyscraper would be seen from inside Disneyland, thus altering the theme park's atmosphere. Disney met with Anaheim city officials and an "anti-skyline ordinance" was passed, which stated that no high rise in Anaheim could be built which could be seen from inside Disneyland. This forced the city to expand outward, instead of upward.

Today, the commercial heart of Anaheim consists of three districts: Downtown Anaheim, the Anaheim Resort, and the Platinum Triangle. Anaheim experienced rapid suburban growth in the 1960s, and many regional shopping malls opened in and around Anaheim, taking business from Downtown Anaheim and causing it to deteriorate. By the mid-1970s, Downtown Anaheim had experienced severe urban blight.

While many American cities tried to revitalize and save their historic downtowns, Anaheim chose to demolish it. While at first, downtown merchants tried to attract shoppers by renovating their properties and the city provided off-street parking, it was not enough. In 1973, the city adopted a Redevelopment Plan "Alpha" which called for the demolition of nearly all the buildings in the 200-acre (81 ha) historic downtown and replacing them with a new downtown with a new civic center, the Anaheim Towne Center strip mall and office buildings. This process took a little more than fifteen years.

In August, 1978, Diann Marsh tried but failed to get 24 buildings listed on the National Register of Historic Places, including:

- Martinet Hardware, 323 W. Center/Lincoln
- SQR Store, SW corner Center (Old Lincoln) & Lemon
- Rosemarie Apartments
- California Building
- Cassou Building
- Marietta Court Apartments
- Fox Theater block, Center Street (Old Lincoln)
- Old Zion Lutheran Church (1922), Chartres at Emily
- Kraemer Garage
- Carnegie Library
- Pickwick Hotel
- Masonic Temple, 104 N. Emily
- Angelina Kraemer Hotel (1924), Center at Philadelphia
- City Hall
- Samuel Kraemer building
- German Methodist Church
- Church of His Holy Presence, 325 W. Broadway
- First Presbyterian Church, 310 W. Broadway
- Ferdinand Backs house (Baxhaus, 1902), 225 N. Claudina
- Richard Melrose house
- Union Pacific Depot, 625 E. Center

For years, Downtown Anaheim remained a series of dusty vacant lots. But in 1991, it came to life with the opening of two new office buildings, small retailers and hundreds of new homes. However, Pacific Bell relocated 200 workers and closed its office in Fall 1995, causing Downtown retailers to lose traffic. In 2002, Anaheim approved a $65 million project for a new library, retail, 500 apartments, and parking, including the revitalization of Anaheim Towne Center. However Anaheim cancelled the library plans and put the Towne Center improvements on hold in 2003. The Anaheim Packing House food hall did later open.

=== Anaheim Towne Center strip mall ===
In 1978, the city gave W&D Commercial Properties Inc. permission to develop the 10.83-acre (4.38 ha) Anaheim Towne Center site. The city had spent $8.8 million to acquire the site, move the merchants and make site improvements, but W&D paid just over $1 million. The center replaced the buildings that were located south side of the 100 and 200 blocks of West Lincoln Av. (orig. Center Street), and its parking lot and outbuildings replaced the buildings on the north side. Safeway, Sav-On and Anaheim Savings & Loan were the initial anchor stores. Developer Don C. Bode was critical of what he called the "cheap" construction and plain design of the Anaheim Towne Center strip mall, which opened in October 1980, developed by Watt Commercial Development Co. of Santa Monica. Some of the merchants there did business in the old downtown, such as Olsons Barber and Beauty Supply.

Lincoln Avenue was diverted one block north from Harbor Boulevard to East Street. The old Lincoln Avenue disappeared from Harbor to Lemon and became part of the parking lot of Anaheim Towne Center. From Lemon to East Lincoln was renamed Center Street, its original name.

=== Remaining pre-1978 buildings ===
The only structures from the old business district which still stand today are the old Carnegie Library, now the Muzeo, and the Kraemer Building (the old Bank of America Building)-the tallest building in Anaheim prior to Disneyland's opening in 1955. The tallest building in Downtown Anaheim today is West City Hall at fourteen stories high.

== See also ==
- Platinum Triangle District
