= Samuel Kraemer =

Samuel Kraemer (July 9, 1857 – 1937) was an American rancher, farmer and businessman who is credited with much of the development of Anaheim, California during the 1920s.

== Life ==
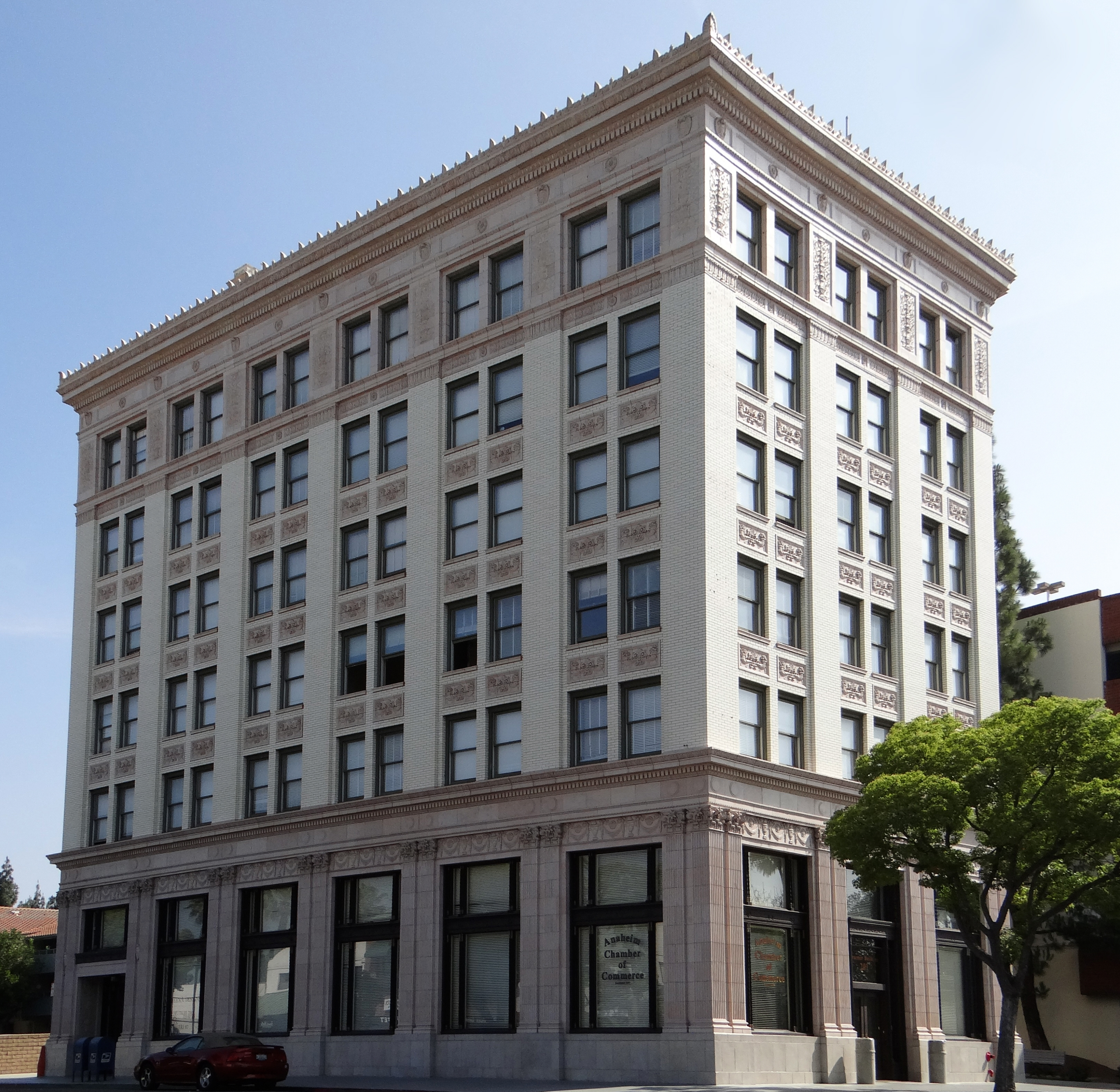
Later known as the Kraemer Building, the American Savings Bank of Anaheim was constructed by Kraemer in 1923 from a design by the architect M. Eugene Durfee.

Kraemer was born July 9, 1857, in Illinois, the son of Elenora Schrag and Daniel Kraemer. His father moved the family to Orange County in 1867, becoming the first English-speaking settlers in Placentia, California.

He married Angelina Yorba, a descendant of Jose Antonio Yorba, in 1886, joining parts of the old Yorba lands to his own tracts. He eventually would inherit a piece of his father's sizable land holdings too.

When Union Oil Company discovered oil on his property around 1919, Kraemer became one of the richest men in Southern California. In 1925, he built the first high-rise building in Anaheim, the Kraemer Building. Later, he developed the Angelina Hotel, also in Anaheim. He and his wife had eight children: Samuel Peter, Arnold Ruperto, Angelina, Adelia, Gilbert Ulysses, Lawrence Prudencio, Geraldine, and Louis Thomas.

== Legacy ==
Kraemer Avenue running through the cities of Anaheim, Brea, Placentia, and Orange is named in his honor.
