= Daniel Kraemer =

Daniel Kraemer (1816–1882) was the first English-speaking pioneer to settle Placentia, California.

Born in Kingdom of Bavaria on November 16, 1816, Kraemer emigrated to the United States in 1838 and settled near Belleville, Illinois. In 1865, he traveled to Southern California and purchased a 3,900 acres (16 km^{2}) parcel of land and an adobe house from Juan Pacifico Ontiveros' Rancho San Juan Cajon de Santa Ana. Two years later, he traveled to Illinois and returned with his family. He operated the ranch until his death on February 6, 1882. In addition, Kraemer donated the land for a school and established the Cajon School District in 1875.

Daniel Kraemer and his wife, Magdalena Shrag, had nine children. His son, Samuel Kraemer, is credited with the development of the downtown of Anaheim during the 1920s.
