= Disneyland Resort =

Entertainment resort in Anaheim, California, US

Coordinates: 33.8091°N 117.9190°W

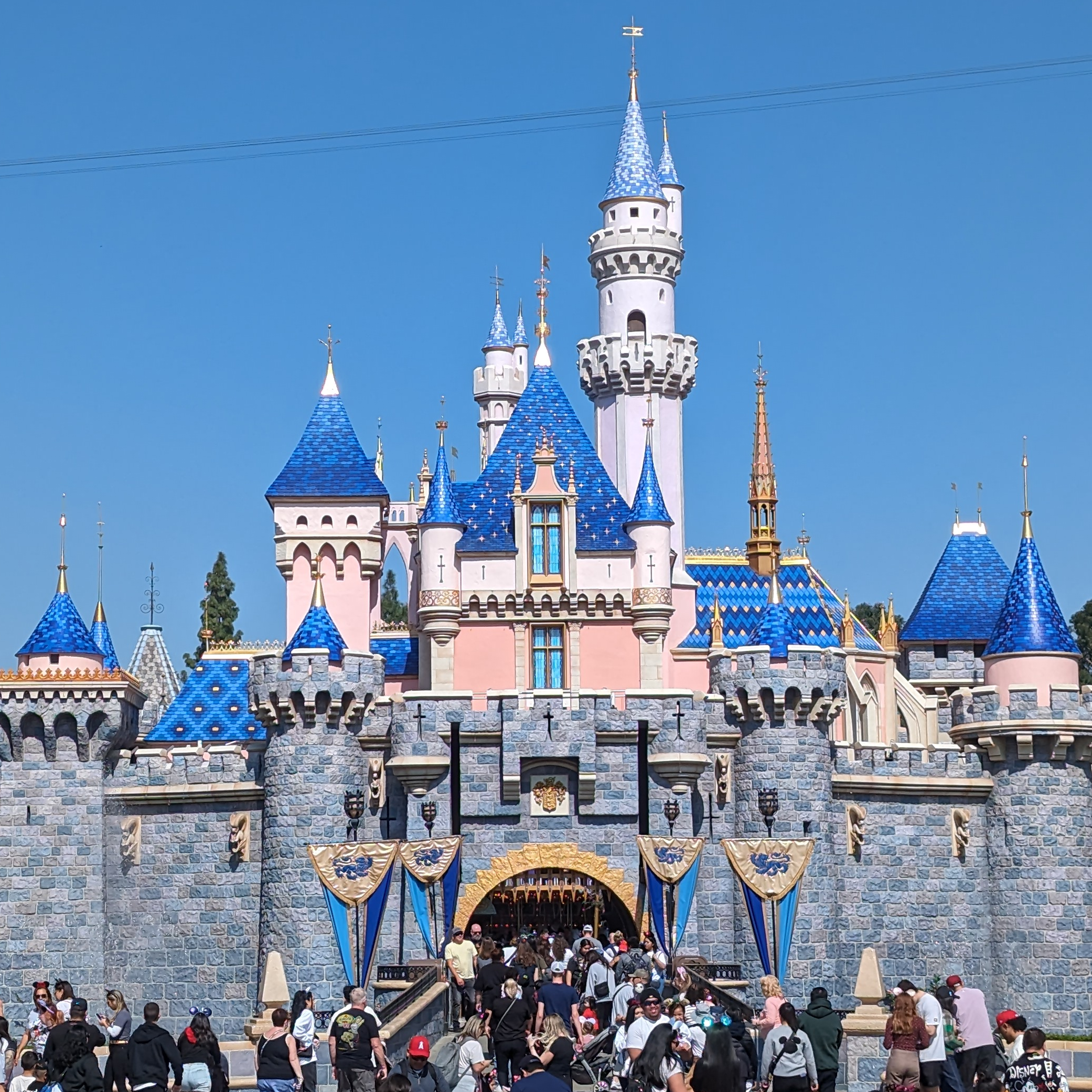
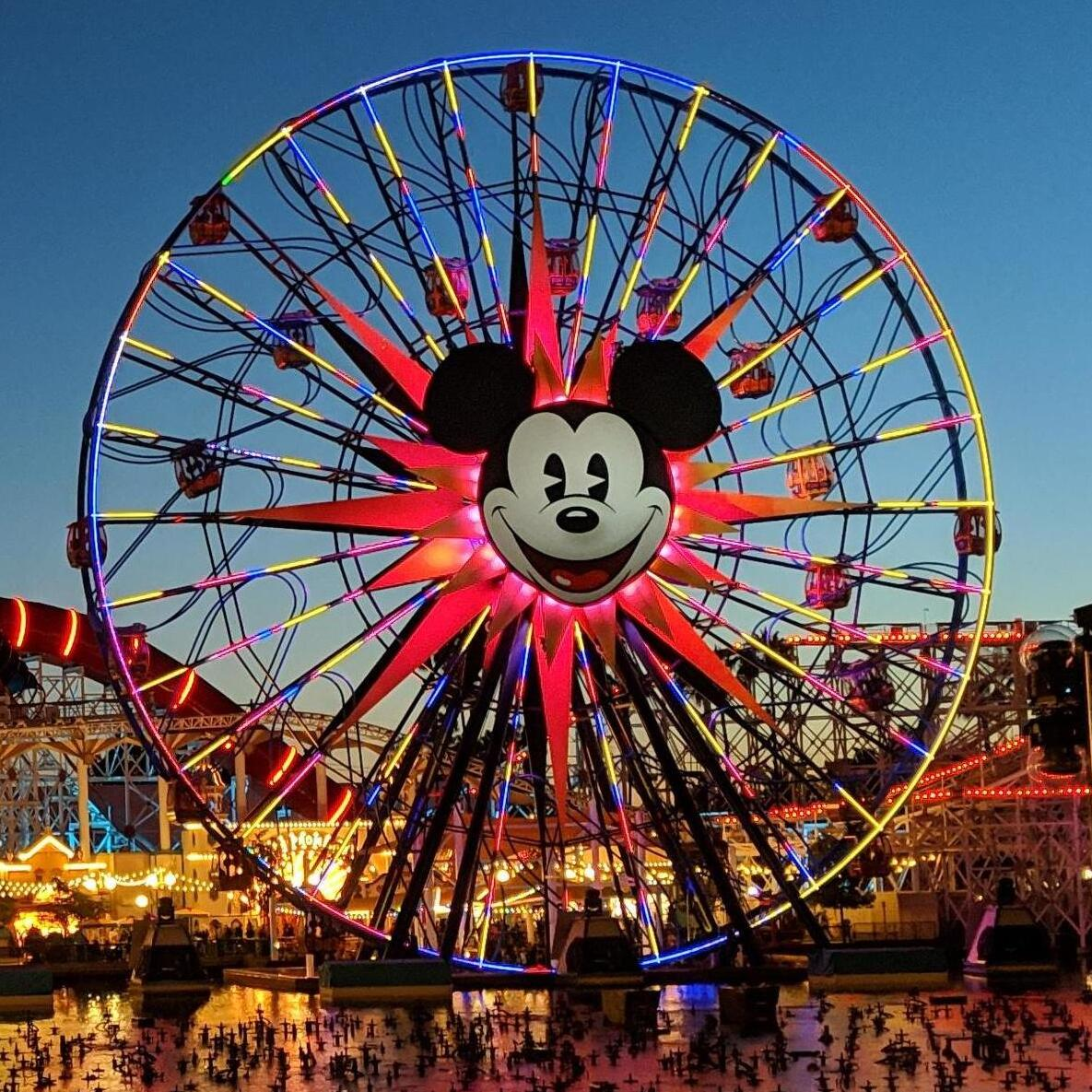
- Two icons of the Disneyland Resort: Sleeping Beauty Castle at Disneyland Park and the Pixar Pal-A-Round at Disney California Adventure.
- Industry: Amusement parks and resorts
- Founded: July 17, 1955; 71 years ago
- Founder: Walt Disney
- Headquarters: Anaheim, California, United States
- Key people: Jill Estorino (president)
- Parent: Disney Experiences
- Website: Official website

The Disneyland Resort is an entertainment resort in Anaheim, California, United States. It is owned and operated by the Walt Disney Company through its Experiences division and is home to two theme parks (Disneyland and Disney California Adventure), three hotels, and the Downtown Disney shopping, dining, and entertainment district.

The resort was developed by Walt Disney in the 1950s. When it opened to guests on July 17, 1955, the property consisted of Disneyland, its 100-acre (40 ha) parking lot, and the Disneyland Hotel, owned and operated by Disney's business partner Jack Wrather.

After the success with the multi-park, multi-hotel business model at Walt Disney World in Florida, Disney acquired large parcels of land adjacent to Disneyland to apply the same business model in Anaheim. The company purchased the Disneyland Hotel from Wrather in 1988 and in 1995 purchased the Pan Pacific Hotel from the Tokyu Group to become today's Pixar Place Hotel. Land purchases continued through the 1990s and the company now owns 489 acres (198 ha) and has long-term lease rights to develop an additional 52 acres (21 ha). A major expansion came in 2001 when the property saw the addition of the Grand Californian Hotel, Disney California Adventure Park, and Downtown Disney.

== History ==
=== Concept and construction ===
Walt Disney's early concepts for an amusement park called for a "Mickey Mouse Park" located adjacent to the Walt Disney Studios in Burbank (presently the site of the West Coast headquarters of ABC). As new ideas emerged, Walt and his brother Roy realized that the Burbank location would be too small for the project, and hired a consultant from Stanford Research Institute to provide them with information on locations and economic feasibility. The consultant recommended a remote location in Anaheim, adjacent to the then-under-construction Santa Ana Freeway. The consultant correctly predicted that the location – covered by orange groves at the time – would become the population center of Southern California.

Since the location was far from Southern California population centers in the 1950s, Walt Disney wanted to build a hotel so that Disneyland visitors traveling long distances could stay overnight. However, the park had depleted his financial resources, so he negotiated a deal with Hollywood producer Jack Wrather in which he would build and operate a hotel called the Disneyland Hotel across the street from Disneyland.

In 1963, city planner James Rouse, in a commencement speech at the Harvard Graduate School of Design, called Disneyland "the greatest piece of urban design in the United States today."

=== 1955–1998: One park, one hotel ===
Disneyland opened on July 17, 1955, with a televised press preview event on ABC, and the inauguration drew nearly 30,000 guests on the first day. Despite the disastrous event, later dubbed "Black Sunday", during which several rides broke down, and other mishaps occurred, Disneyland became a huge success in its first year of operation. The hotel, which opened three months after the park, enjoyed similar success. Walt Disney wanted to build more facilities for Disneyland visitors to stay in Anaheim, but since his financial resources were drained, entrepreneurs established their own independent hotels in the area surrounding the park and hotel to capitalize on Disneyland's success.

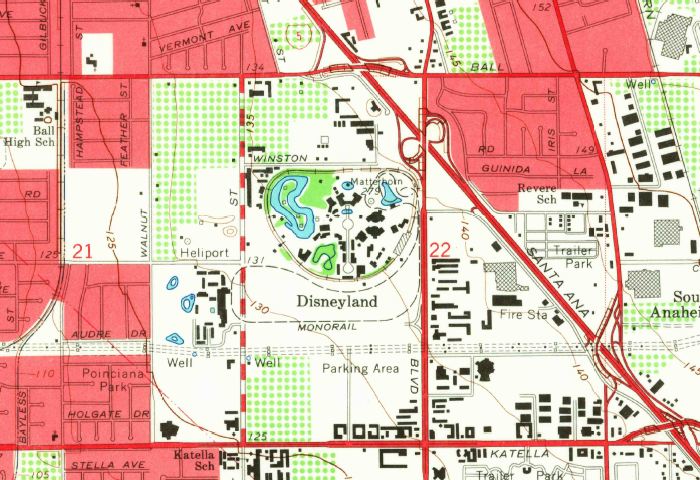
Topographical map of Disneyland from 1965

To Walt Disney's dismay, the city of Anaheim was lax in restricting their construction, eager for the tax revenue generated by more hotels in the city. The area surrounding Disneyland became suffused with the kind of tacky atmosphere of colorful lights, flashy neon signs, and then-popular Googie architecture which he had wanted to avoid (and which years earlier had caused the city of Burbank to deny his initial request to build his project in Burbank). The Anaheim Convention Center was built across the street from Disneyland's original parking lot, and residences were constructed in the area as part of the city's growth in the late 20th century. Eventually, Disneyland was "boxed in", a factor which would later lead Walt Disney to acquire a significantly larger parcel of land for the construction of Walt Disney World. The Walt Disney Company gradually acquired the land west of the park, notably the Disneyland Hotel in 1988 following Jack Wrather's death in 1984, the Pan Pacific Hotel (known today as Pixar Place Hotel) in 1995, and several properties north of the Disneyland Hotel in the mid to late 1990s.

=== 1998–2001: Planning an expansion ===
After Walt's and Roy's deaths in 1966 and 1971, respectively, the Walt Disney Company would go on to achieve success with the multi-park, multi-hotel resort complex business model of Walt Disney World in Florida, which opened in 1971. In the 1990s, Disney decided to turn Disneyland into a similar multi-park, multi-hotel resort destination. In 1991, Disney announced plans to build WestCOT, a theme park based on Walt Disney World's EPCOT Center, mostly on the site of the 15,167-space 100-acre (40 ha) parking lot. Its estimated cost was US$3 billion, largely due to the cost of land that Disney would need to acquire.

However, the Euro Disney Resort, which opened in 1992, was a financial and public relations burden for the company and Disney was unable to finance the WestCOT project, and it was cancelled in 1995. That summer, Disney executives gathered in Aspen, Colorado for a 3-day retreat, where they came up with the idea for a California-themed park, dubbed Disney's California Adventure Park, a retail district, and hotels. The budget for the project would be $1.4 billion, less than half of WestCOT, achieved by building a smaller theme park only on land Disney owned, focused on shopping and dining and using many off-the-shelf rides, avoiding costly research and development. The parking lot closed on January 21, 1998 to make way for construction. To replace the lost spaces, Disney opened a seven-story, 10,250-space parking structure on July 24, 2000.

California Adventure opened on February 8, 2001 and was widely panned by critics and early visitors, leading to substantially less attendance than expected. One area of significant criticism was that the park was aimed at adults, rather than children and families. Disney executives later acknowledged that the park offered less value to visitors, with one-third as many attractions and fewer characters than Disneyland, leaving many families to choose to visit the older park instead.

=== 2001–present: Disneyland Resort complex ===
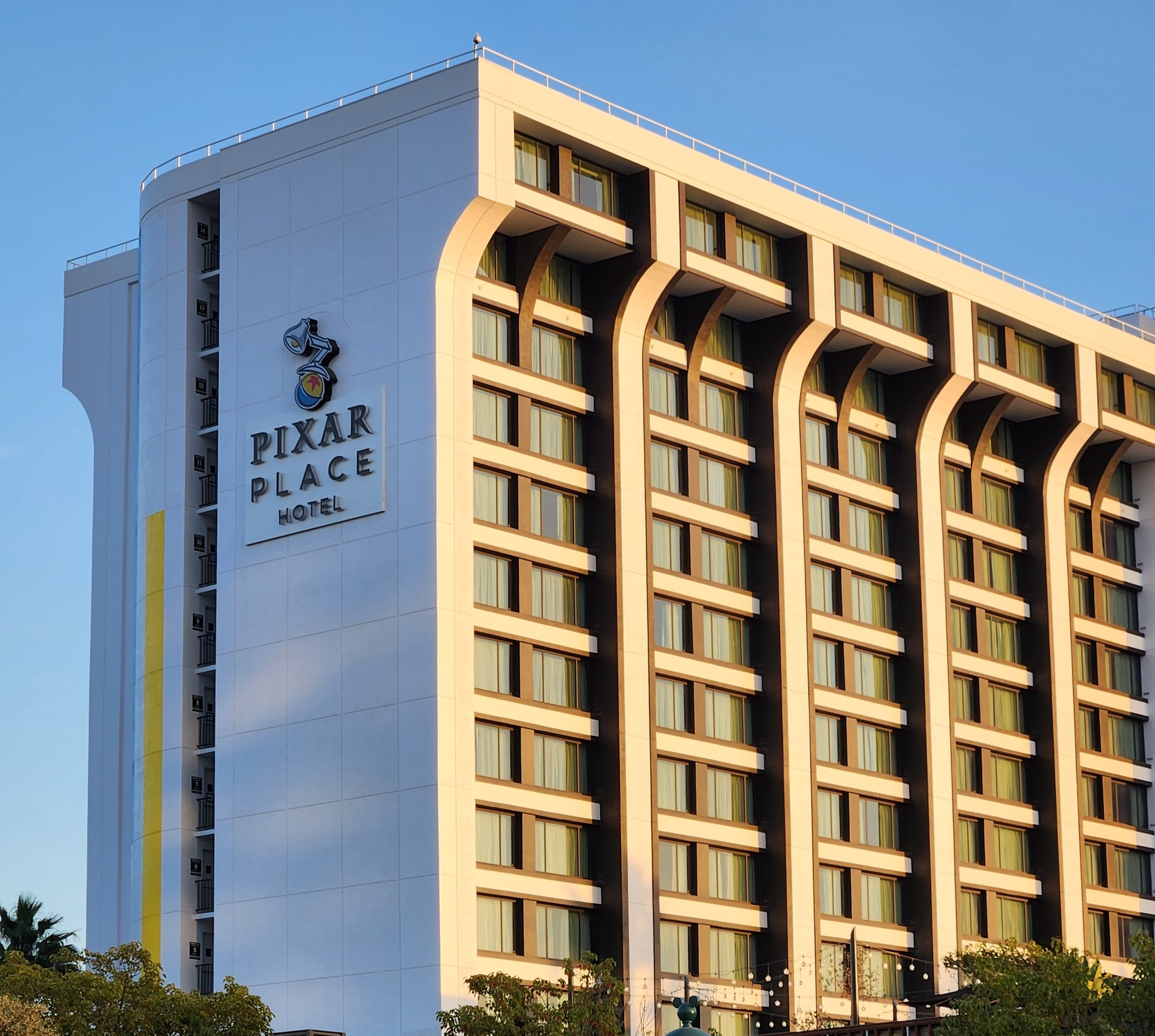
Pixar Place Hotel is themed to artwork created by Pixar Animation Studios

Disney began to quickly make changes to California Adventure, adding A Bug's Land to appeal to families and The Twilight Zone Tower of Terror thrill ride for older guests. In late 2007, the company began a multi-year, $1.1 billion redesign and expansion plan for California Adventure (against its initial $600 million cost to build). The most drastic changes to the park included a complete overhaul of the main entrance, the construction of a new Cars Land and the addition of the World of Color nighttime show. Additionally, many of the park's off-the-shelf rides were either removed outright or re-themed to have more of a focus on Disney and Pixar characters. Construction was completed in 2012. The redesign and expansion of the park saw attendance rates increase dramatically.

In August 2015, it was announced that Disneyland Park would receive a 14-acre Star Wars-themed land scheduled to open in 2019. It opened on May 31, 2019. Star Wars: Galaxy's Edge is home of two attractions, Millennium Falcon – Smugglers Run, and Star Wars: Rise of the Resistance.

In January 2017, The Twilight Zone Tower of Terror closed and was replaced with Guardians of the Galaxy – Mission: Breakout!, which opened that summer. In October 2017, Disney announced a new Pixar Pals parking structure for the resort, which includes a 6,500-space parking structure, and a new transportation hub, which opened in July 2019.

In March 2018, it was announced that A Bug's Land would close in September 2018. It was replaced by Avengers Campus on June 4, 2021.

In April 2019, Disneyland announced that Mickey & Minnie's Runaway Railway would be coming to Disneyland in 2023. The attraction was built behind Mickey's Toontown in a former backstage area and opened on January 27, 2023.

In January 2024, Disney's Paradise Pier Hotel officially reopened as Pixar Place Hotel.

=== Future expansion and proposed DisneylandForward project ===
Disney announced plans to build a fourth hotel at the resort in 2016, slated for an opening in 2021. In August 2018, the hotel was placed on hold indefinitely because of a dispute with the city of Anaheim. The project was cancelled in October 2018 when the Anaheim City Council removed tax incentives.

In March 2021, Disney announced a new project for the resort called DisneylandForward. This proposal is designed to change the city of Anaheim's zoning rules so that Disney can build more theme park space for both Disneyland and Disney California Adventure. Proposals have included building more space where Pixar Place Hotel and the surrounding parking lots on the west-side of the resort currently reside. Rumors have surfaced that a new version of a mixed-use Disney Springs would be built near the Toy Story parking lot. In May 2024, DisneylandForward received final approval from the Anaheim City Council.

In June 2025, it was announced that the east side of the resort will receive a new transportation hub, which will include a 6,000-space parking structure and pedestrian bridge. Construction began in August 2026.

== Location ==
Resort property owned or controlled by Disney

The Disneyland Resort is located several miles south of downtown Anaheim, in an area branded by the city as the Anaheim Resort near the border of neighboring Garden Grove. The resort is generally bounded by Harbor Boulevard to the east, Katella Avenue to the south, Walnut Street to the west and Ball Road to the north. Interstate 5 borders the resort at an angle on the northeastern corner.

Not all land bordered by these streets is part of the Disneyland Resort, particularly near the intersection of Harbor Boulevard and Katella Avenue, and along Ball Road between Disneyland Drive and Walnut Street. Disneyland Drive cuts through the resort on a north–south route and provides access to the Mickey & Friends Parking Structure, Downtown Disney, and the three hotels. Magic Way connects Walnut Street to Disneyland Drive just south of the Mickey & Friends Parking Structure and provides access to the parking structure, Disneyland Hotel, and Downtown Disney.

Special off-ramps from Interstate 5 combined with a reversible flyover over the intersection of Ball Road and Disneyland Drive permit access into and out of the Mickey & Friends and Pixar Pals parking garages during peak morning and evening traffic times.

Public transportation is provided by Anaheim Resort Transportation with services to Anaheim's ARTIC Station which offers connections to Greater L.A.'s Metrolink regional rail.

== Facilities ==
The Disneyland Resort includes two theme parks, three hotels owned by Disney, along with a shopping, dining and entertainment complex.

=== Theme parks ===
- Disneyland, the company's first theme park and the only one built by Walt Disney, which opened on July 17, 1955.
- Disney California Adventure, a theme park based on Disney's interpretation of California, which opened on February 8, 2001.

=== Shopping, dining, and entertainment ===
- Downtown Disney, a 15-acre (6.1 ha) outdoor shopping, dining, and entertainment district with approximately 30 venues, mostly operated by third parties that pay rent to Disney.

=== Hotels ===
The Disneyland Resort includes three company owned and operated hotels with approximately 2,400 rooms, 180 Disney Vacation Club villas, and 180,000 square feet (17,000 m^{2}) of conference meeting space.

- Disneyland Hotel, the resort's original hotel built by Jack Wrather which opened on October 5, 1955, and was purchased by Disney in 1988.
- Pixar Place Hotel, a hotel themed to artwork created by Pixar Animation Studios. Opened in 1984 as the Emerald of Anaheim, operated by the Tokyu Group and later named The Pan Pacific Hotel Anaheim, the hotel was purchased by Disney in December 1995, for a reported US$36 million, and renamed the Disneyland Pacific Hotel. As part of the 1998–2001 expansion of the resort, it was re-branded as Disney's Paradise Pier Hotel. The lobby and convention/banquet facilities had undergone several renovations since the re-branding, most notably in 2004 and 2005. It officially reopened as Pixar Place Hotel on January 30, 2024.
- Disney's Grand Californian Hotel & Spa, based on the Craftsman style of architecture of the early 1900s, which opened on January 2, 2001.

== Ticket prices ==
Approximately 60,000 people visited the park on Disneyland's opening day, July 17, 1955, when park admission was priced at $1 for adults and 50¢ for children. This did not include access to rides and other individual attractions; attraction tickets could be purchased separately for 10¢ to 35¢. Single attraction tickets were permanently eliminated in June 1982; access to all the park's attractions were included in the price of park admission.

Admission prices have greatly increased since the gates first opened, due in part to inflation, the continuing construction and renovation of attractions, and the addition of a second theme park, Disney California Adventure. As of January 17, 2020, one-day "Park Hopper" tickets, allowing entry to both Disneyland and Disney California Adventure, are priced from $154 to $199 for adults, and from $148 to $191 for children. Now in the year 2025, Disneyland ticket prices start at $104 for a one park ticket. Visitors can also purchase one-park tickets and multi-day tickets.

In addition to daily tickets, in 1984 an annual pass (called an "Annual Premium Passport") was introduced granting daily entry for a year at a time for $65 for adults and $49 for children. As of October 2025, annual passes (now called the "Magic Key") range in price from $599 to $1,889.

== See also ==
- List of Disney theme park attractions
- List of incidents at Disneyland Resort
- Large amusement railways
- List of Disney attractions that were never built
- Rail transport in Walt Disney Parks and Resorts
- Walt Disney Travel Company
- Legoland California
- Universal Studios Hollywood
