= Pixar Place Hotel =

Hotel at Disneyland Resort

Coordinates: 33.8063°N 117.9245°W

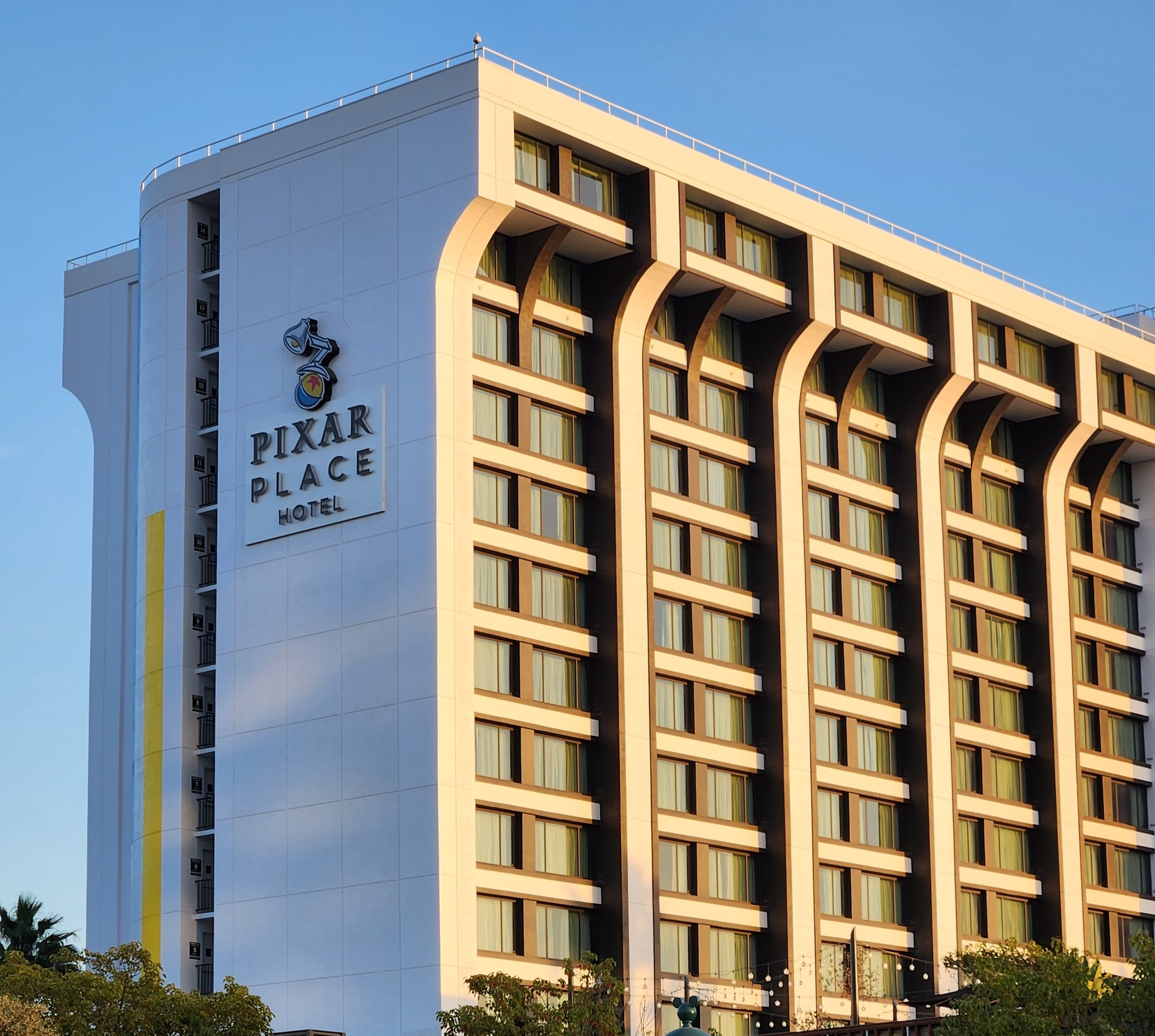
- The upper portion of the building
- Former names: The Emerald of Anaheim (1984–1989); Pan Pacific Hotel (1989–1995); Disneyland Pacific Hotel (1995–2000); Paradise Pier Hotel

General information
- Type: Hotel
- Landlord: Disney Experiences

Technical details
- Floor count: 15

The Pixar Place Hotel is a hotel at the Disneyland Resort in Anaheim, California, United States. It is owned by the Walt Disney Company and operated through their Disney Experiences division. Hence the name, the hotel is themed after the artwork of Disney's subsidiary, Pixar.

The hotel was formerly known as the Paradise Pier Hotel, having been purchased from the Tokyu Group in 1995 while it was still part of their Pan Pacific brand.

During this period, the hotel had a California boardwalk theme. In 2022, Disney announced that it would be renovated into a Pixar-themed hotel. The renovations were completed in January 2024 when the hotel opened in its current state.

== History ==
The building was opened in 1984 as the Emerald of Anaheim, part of the larger Emerald Group of hotels. The hotel, owned by the Tokyu Group, was rebranded to The Pan Pacific Hotel in 1989, before undergoing a $4.5 million renovation in 1994. The property had been leased for it by businessman P.C. Chao.

Around this time, Disney began to acquire land in the area as part of a planned expansion to the Disneyland Resort, and hoped to acquire the hotel, which was reportedly inside the proposed area of expansion. However, negotiations failed due to the owners disagreeing over the proposed sale price.

=== Paradise Pier Hotel ===
The Walt Disney Company eventually purchased the hotel in December 1995 and renamed it to the Disneyland Pacific Hotel. While the price was undisclosed, it was reportedly around $36 million. At the time the hotel had around 350 employees, most of whom remained employed at the hotel after the change of ownership. The hotel underwent a major renovation the next year.

The building was renamed to the Paradise Pier Hotel in 2000, Paradise Pier being the name of a themed land in Disney California Adventure. During this time period, the hotel was themed after the boardwalks of California.

=== Pixar Place Hotel ===
In April 2022, it was announced that the Paradise Pier Hotel would be redesigned into an artistic hotel themed after the work of Pixar Animation Studios. The original Paradise Pier area at Disney California Adventure had previously been rethemed into Pixar Pier in 2018. The hotel underwent renovation while still open. An area in the swimming pool themed after the Finding Nemo franchise was opened in August 2023. The completion reopening date was announced in October.

The completed Pixar Place Hotel was fully opened on January 31, 2024. The hotel features a statue of Luxo Jr. in the lobby, and includes production artwork from every feature film produced by Pixar at the time it opened, including Toy Story, Monsters, Inc., Cars, Ratatouille, Luca, Elemental, and more. Each floor of the hotel is themed after a different film. The hotel now contains the 6,500-square-foot (600 m^{2}) Great Maple restaurant. It is the first restaurant not owned by Disney to open in the resort, and is part of a larger chain. The lobby is also home to the Sketch Pad Cafe, an eatery which sells coffee and baked goods, and STOR-E, a gift shop whose name is a pun on the film title WALL-E.
