= Anaheim Packing House =

- Anaheim Orange and Lemon Association Packing House
- U.S. National Register of Historic Places
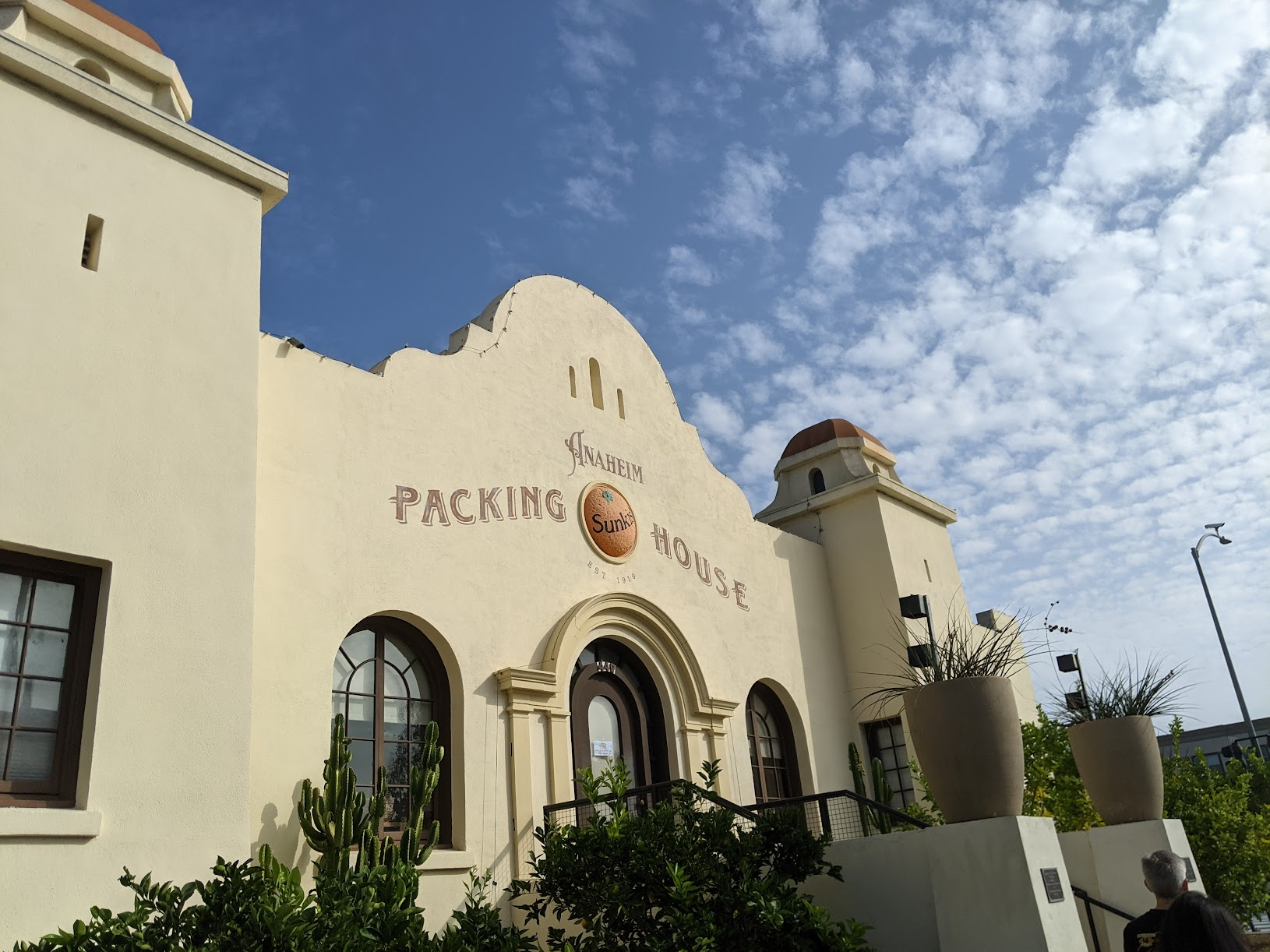
- The exterior of the Packing House in 2021. Though the façade has been preserved, the interior has been converted to a food hall.

- Location within Anaheim, California Location within California
- Location: Anaheim, California
- Coordinates: 33.831457°N 117.912104°W
- Built: 1919
- Architectural style: Spanish Colonial Revival
- Restored: 2014
- NRHP reference No.: 15000379
- Added to NRHP: July 7, 2015

The Anaheim Packing House is a 42,000-square-foot (3,900 m^{2}) gourmet food hall in Downtown Anaheim, California, United States. Along with the Packard Building, a renovated 1925 Mission Revival style building, and a farmer's market, it makes up a shopping center called the Anaheim Packing District. The Packing House opened on May 31, 2014, and is located in a renovated 1919 former Sunkist citrus packing house built in Spanish Colonial Revival style. It is one of the few remaining packing houses in Orange County, and the only one in Anaheim. The packing house was added to the National Register of Historic Places as the Anaheim Orange and Lemon Association Packing House in 2015.

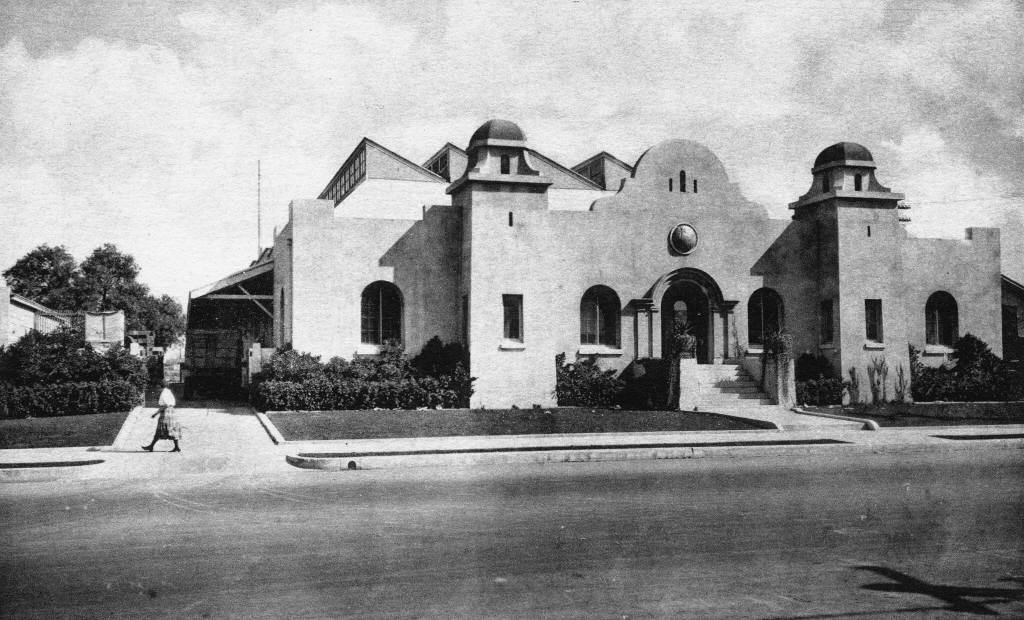
The packing house circa 1936.
