= Grand Theatre (Douglas, Arizona) =

- U.S. National Register of Historic Places
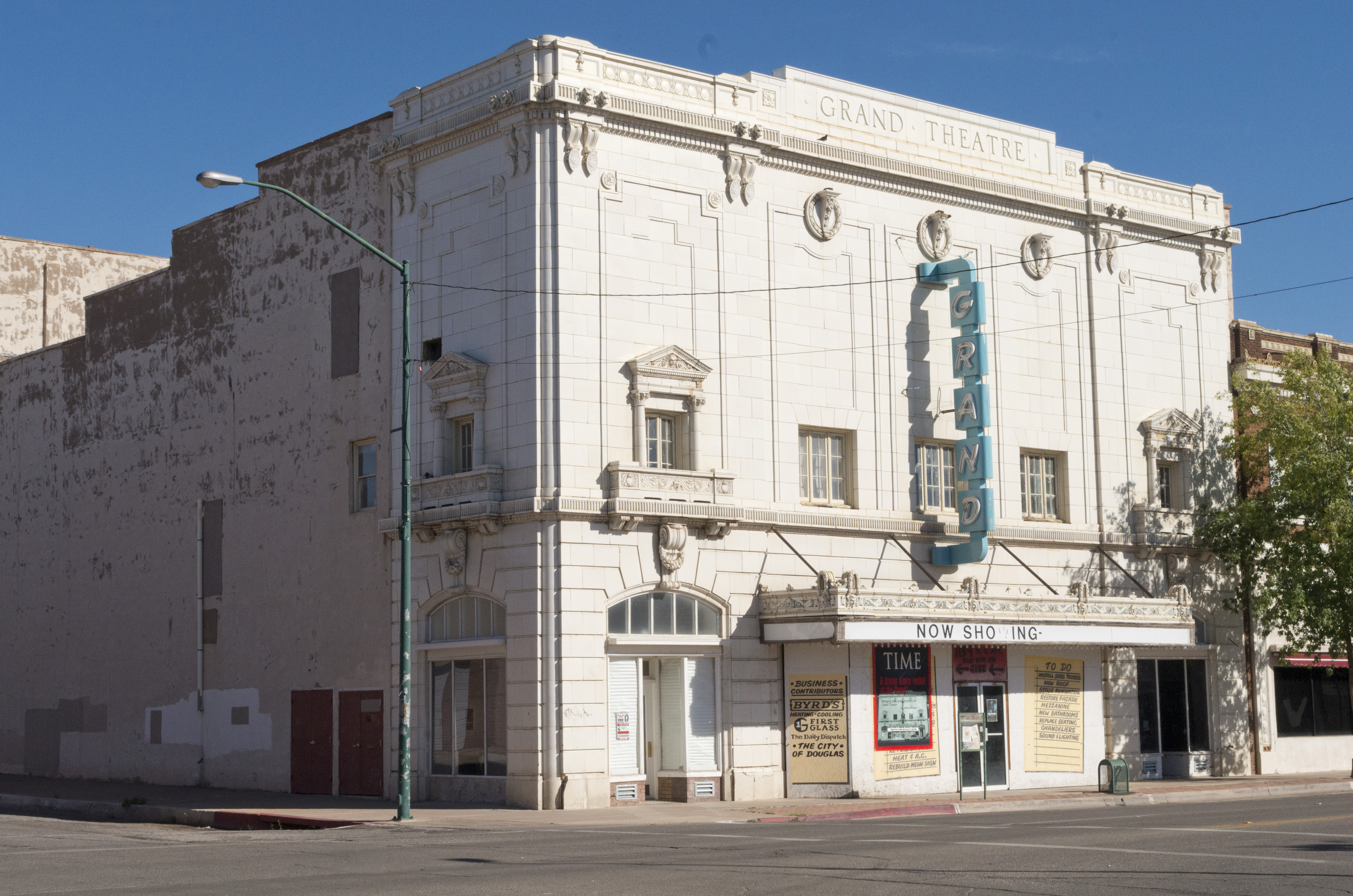

- Location within Arizona Location within the United States
- Location: 1139-1149 G. Ave., Douglas, Arizona
- Coordinates: 31°20′43″N 109°33′35″W
- Built: 1919
- Architect: M. Eugene Durfee
- Architectural style: Classical Revival
- NRHP reference No.: 76000372
- Added to NRHP: July 30, 1976

The Grand Theatre in Douglas, Arizona, designed by M. Eugene Durfee, opened in 1919. Ginger Rogers, Pavlova and John Philip Sousa to mention just a few performed on stage at the Grand Theatre. Originally, it also housed a Tea Room, a candy store and a barbershop. It was the site of many live stage productions, movies, and Douglas High School graduations.

The theater has fallen on hard times over the years, having endured a collapsed roof due to plugged rain gutters and massive interior damage from the infiltrating water. However, the Grand is in the process of being restored to its original condition.

It was listed on the National Register of Historic Places in 1976.

In addition to being listed in the National Register of Historic Places, the Grand is also on the "Endangered List" of Historical Buildings that need immediate attention.
