= SQR Store =

Former department store in Anaheim, California, United States

The S.Q.R. Store
- Founded: 1907
- Founders: August E. Schumacher, Wesley P. Quarton, Oscar H. Renner

SQR Store
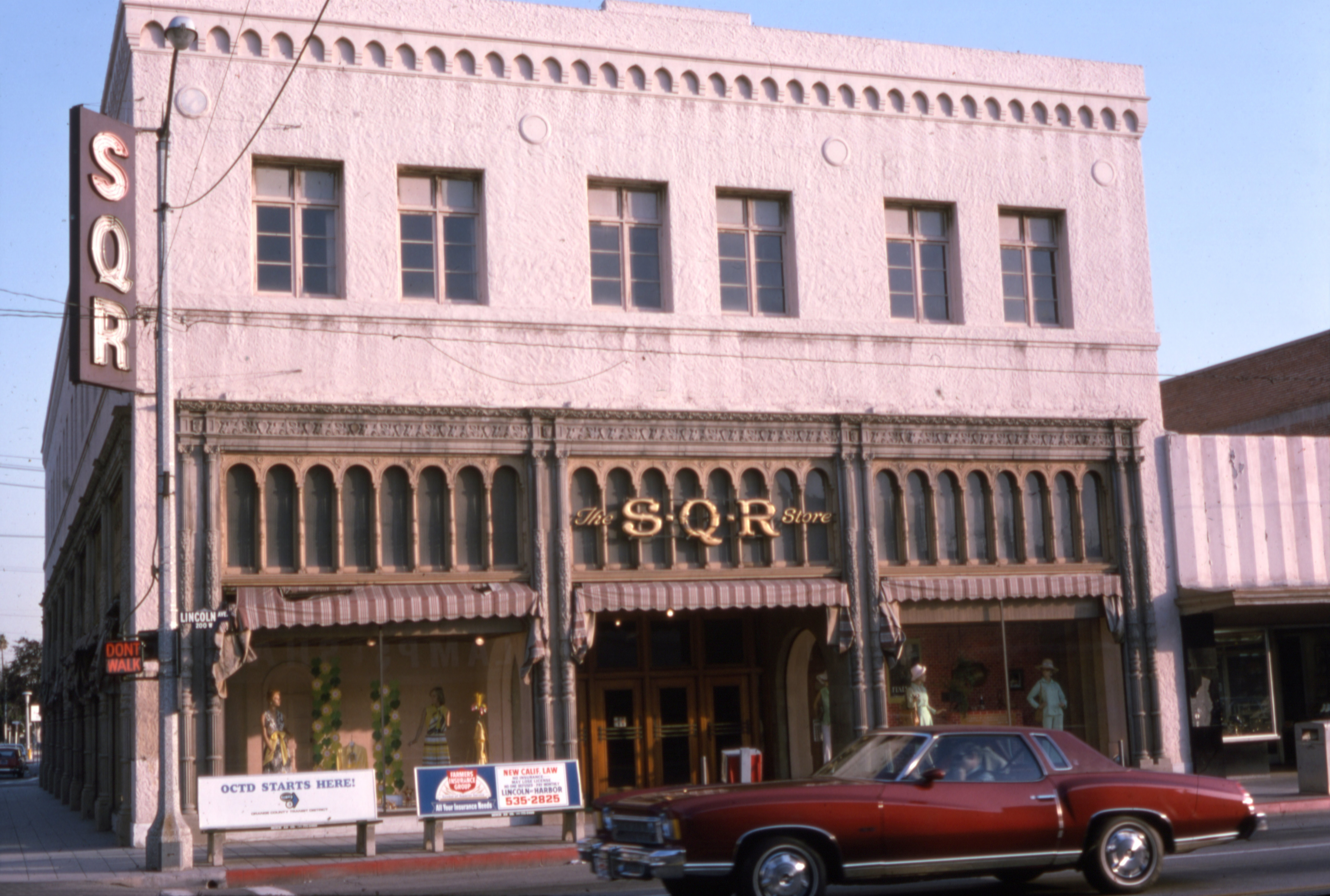
- SQR Store, Downtown Anaheim, May 1975

General information
- Status: Demolished
- Location: (1926–1978) 202 West Center ("old" Lincoln) Street, Anaheim, California
- Coordinates: 33.835420°N 117.916073°W
- Demolished: 1978

The SQR Store, a.k.a. S.Q.R. Store, later simply SQR, was a department store in Downtown Anaheim, California, one of the largest in Orange County of its time. SQR stood for August E. Schumacher (1881–1948), Wesley P. Quarton and Oscar H. Renner.

== First location (1907–1915) ==
The store's original location was at the old Kroeger (Schumacher) Building, northeast corner of Center St. and Los Angeles St. (now Anaheim Blvd.). On March 14, 1907, Schumacher, Quenton and Renner bought the "Pioneer Store" from Charles "Sam" Federman who had already been operating it for 25 years since 1883. Schumacher and Renner were clerks in the store at the time, which the Anaheim Gazette characterized as a "small country store". The three men were the only staff serving customers at that time, but by 1928 the store had grown to a staff of twenty. Competition in these early days included the Falkenstein department store in the Mitchell block at the northwest corner of Center and Los Angeles, which moved to new quarters at the new Casou Building in 1916, which replaced the oldest building in town at that time, the Langenberger adobe.

== Second location (1915–1926) ==
In 1913, the SQR Store moved into a new building that Emil Dreyfus erected at 102 W. Center, southwest corner of Los Angeles, who tore down the existing building there that the Ahlborn & Raymond department store had vacated and which Stern Bros. had occupied before that. where it would remain until 1926.

== Third location (1926–1978) ==
Continuing to grow, in 1926, SQR bought the building at the southwest corner of Center and Lemon streets from the Knights of Pythias, tore down the Herman Dickel grocery and hardware building there, and built a new SQR Store, which would be its final location.

Quarton left the business that year, but the store name remained "S.Q.R."

By 1953 the store staff had grown to 80 strong.

== Decline of Downtown Anaheim ==
In 1954 SQR started to face competition from new, modern and car-friendly shopping centers nearby, including:

- East Anaheim Shopping Center, 1.6 miles east, in March 1954 and expanding in include an 80,000 sq ft (7,400 m^{2}) W. T. Grant and Boston Stores
- the Broadway-anchored Anaheim Plaza, 1.5 miles west, on the 5 freeway at Euclid, opening in 1955
- Orangefair Center in 1956, 1.5 miles north
- Bullock's Fashion Square-Santa Ana in 1958, 5 miles southeast
- The City 4.5 miles south, and the Mall of Orange, 4.5 miles east, both in 1970.

While many American cities tried to revitalize and save their historic downtowns, Anaheim chose to demolish it. While at first, downtown merchants tried to attract shoppers by renovating their properties and the city provided off-street parking, it was not enough. In 1973, the city adopted a Redevelopment Plan "Alpha" which called for the demolition of nearly all the buildings in the 200-acre (81 ha) historic downtown and replacing them with a new downtown with a new civic center, the Anaheim Towne Center strip mall and office buildings. This process took a little more than fifteen years.

The store advertised its imminent closing in September 1973, but Val Renner (widow of Oscar Renner's son Russell) reopened the first floor with her sons. However, in 1978 the Anaheim Redevelopment Agency condemned the building and many other surrounding properties, and the store was razed in mid-1978. In place of the buildings that once formed the retail heart of Downtown Anaheim were built a strip mall anchored by a grocery store, a large parking area even larger than the strip mall, and a rerouted Lincoln Street. As Lincoln has been rerouted, the southwest corner of old Center/Lincoln and Lemon is in the parking lot.

== Gallery ==
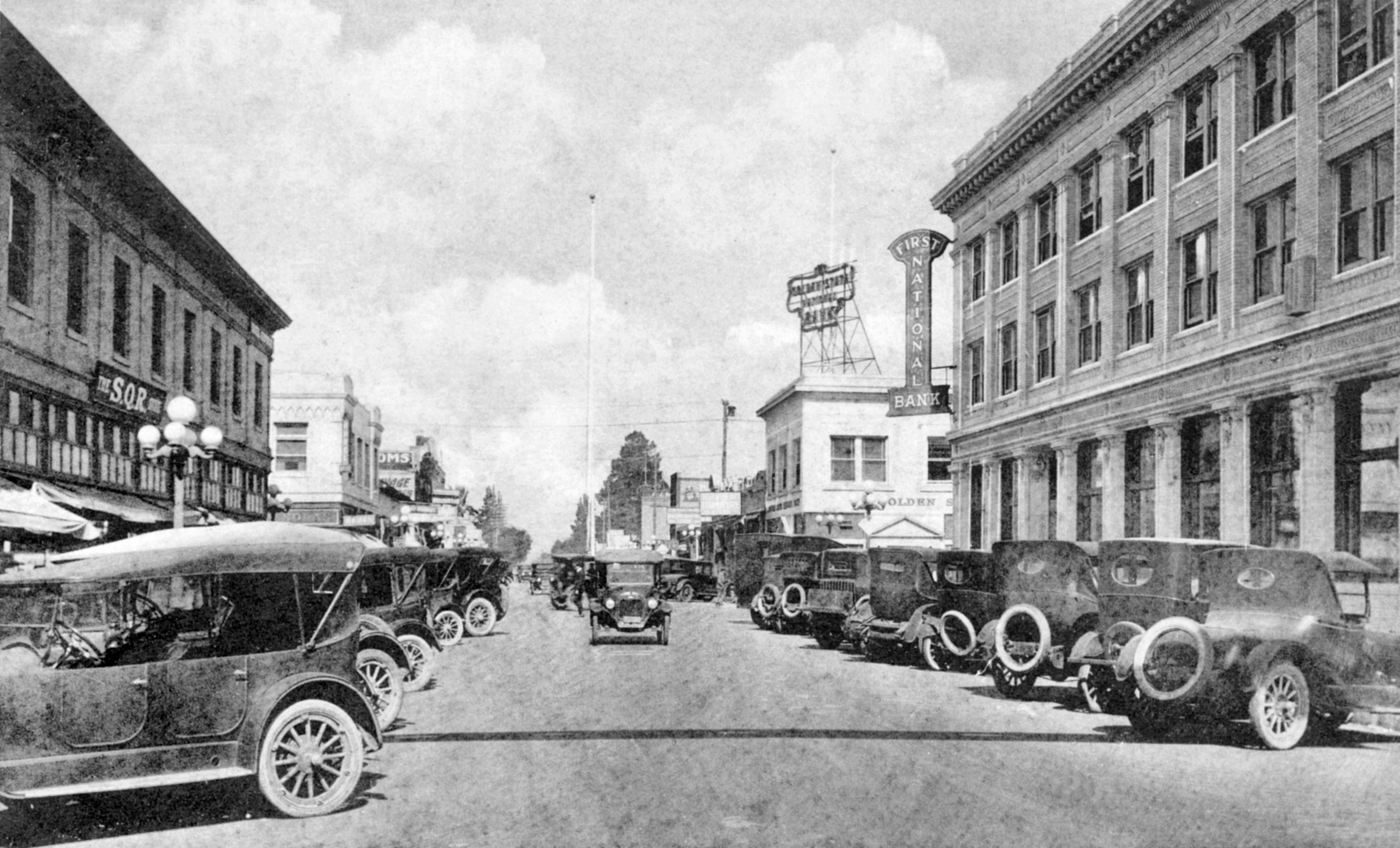
Downtown Anaheim, undated. SQR Store visible at left.

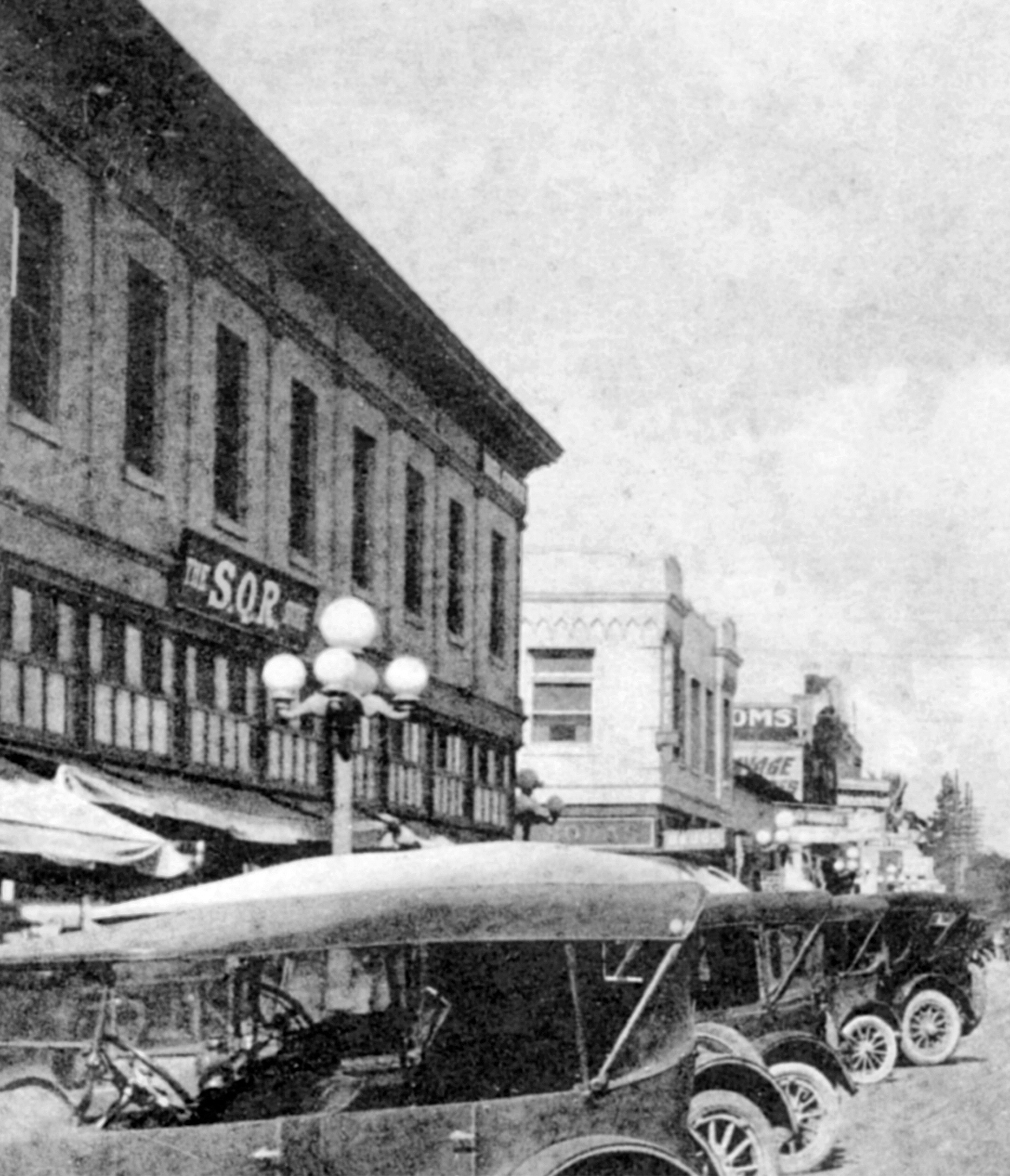
Closeup of SQR Store

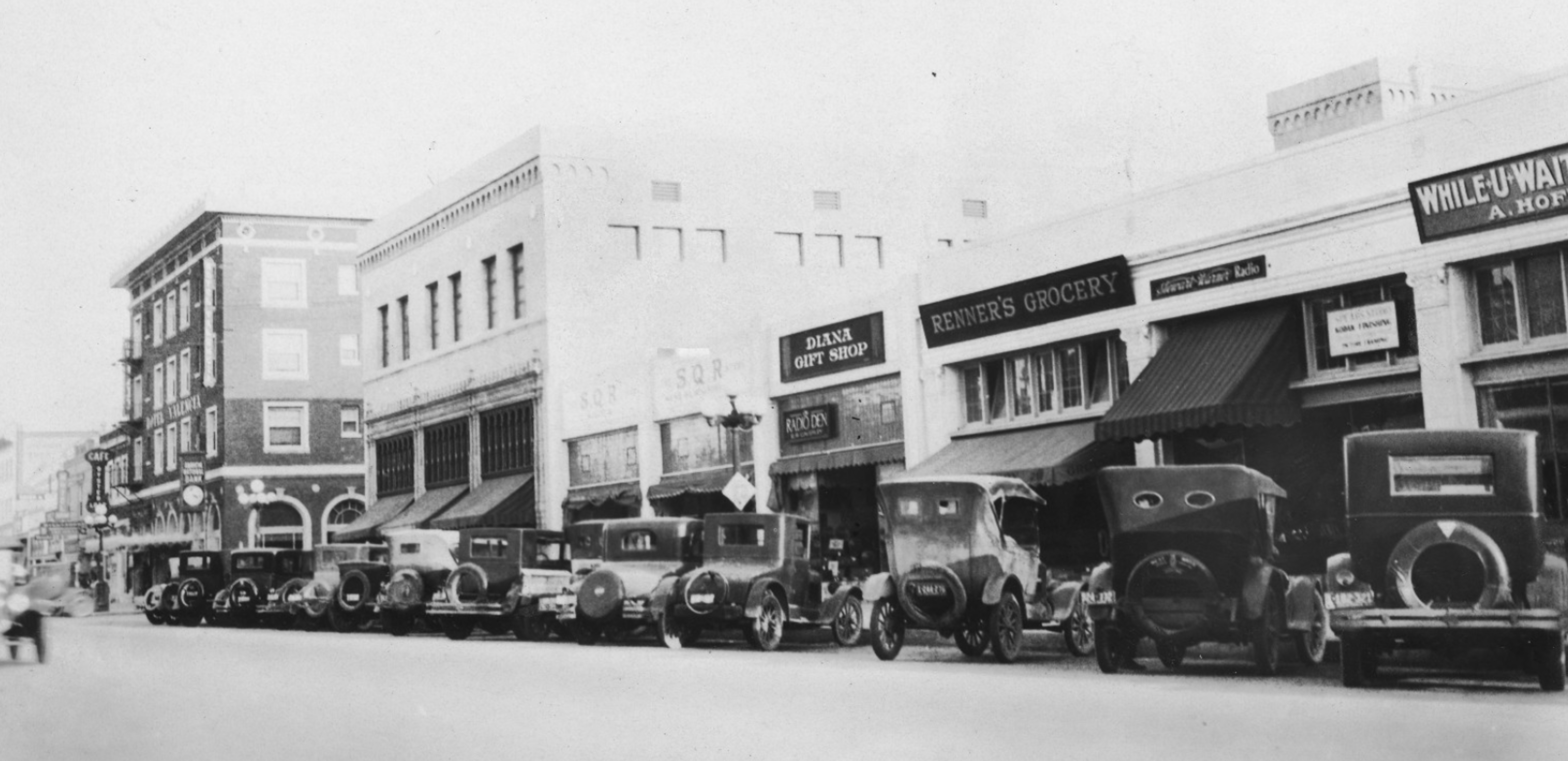
South side of the 200 block of West Center Street, Anaheim, California, c.1924–1926, Valencia Hotel, intersection of Lemon Street, and S.Q.R. department store at left

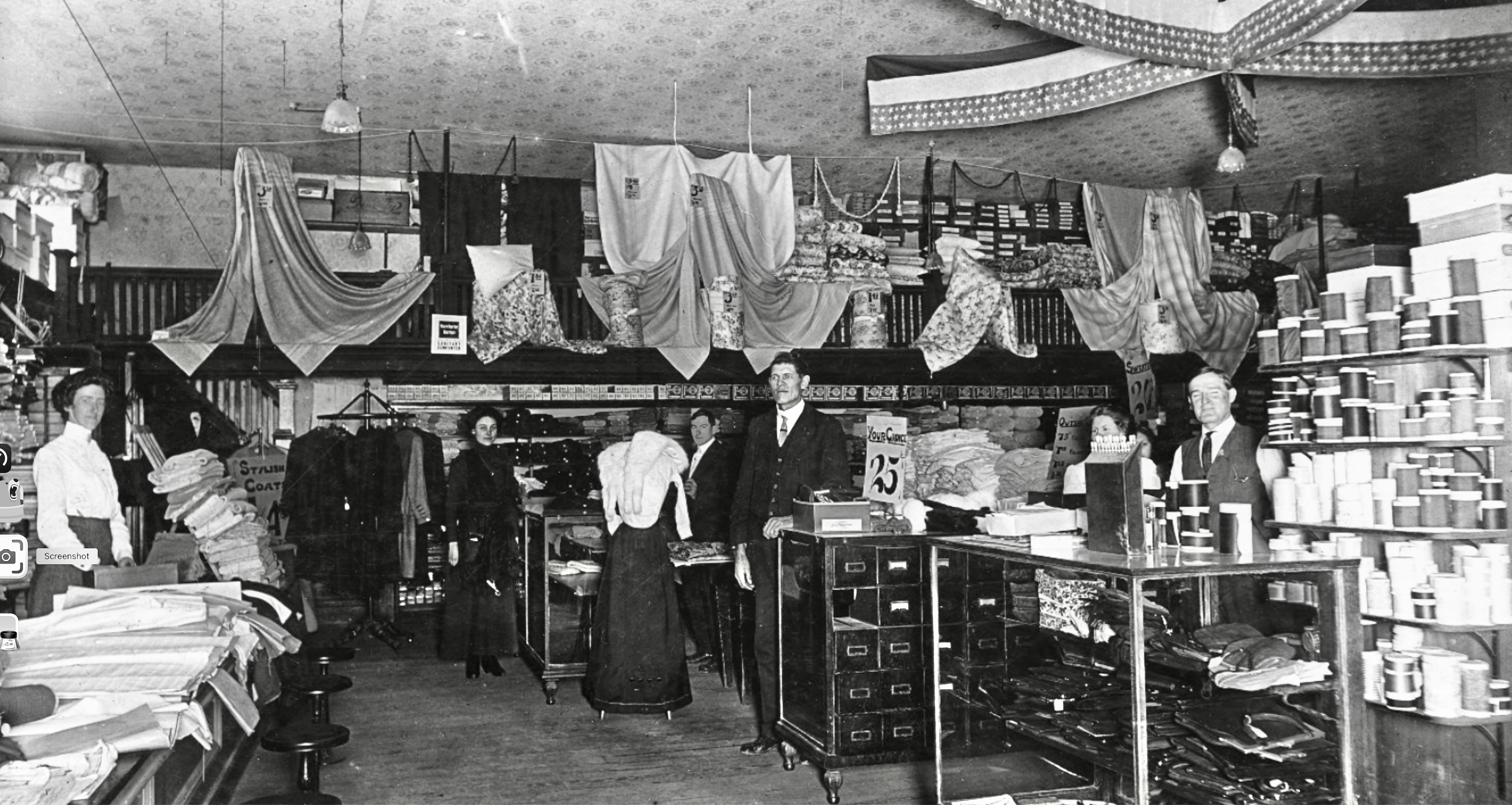
Interior of the S.Q.R. department store, Anaheim, California, c.1900

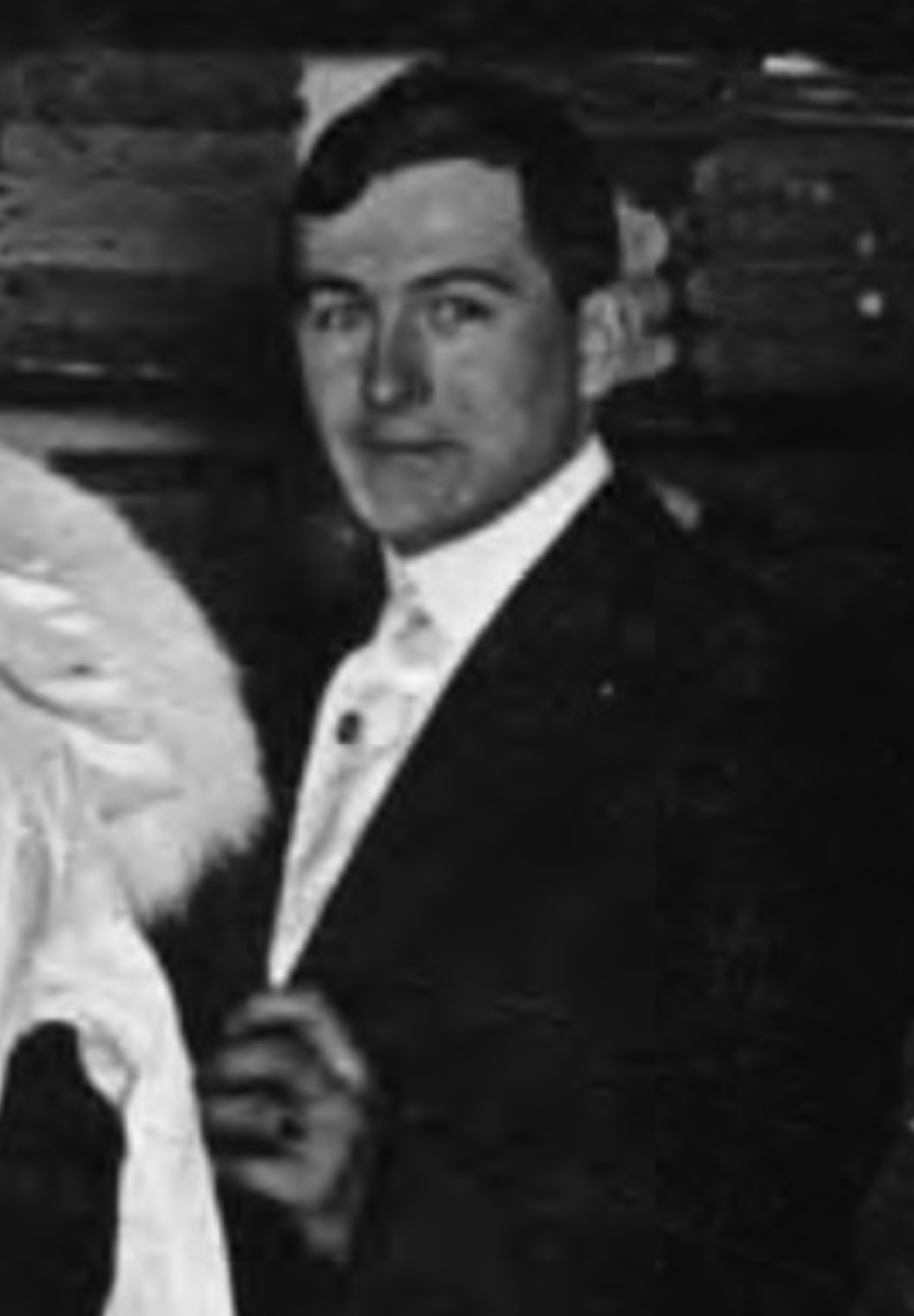
Oscar H. Renner at S.Q.R., 1911

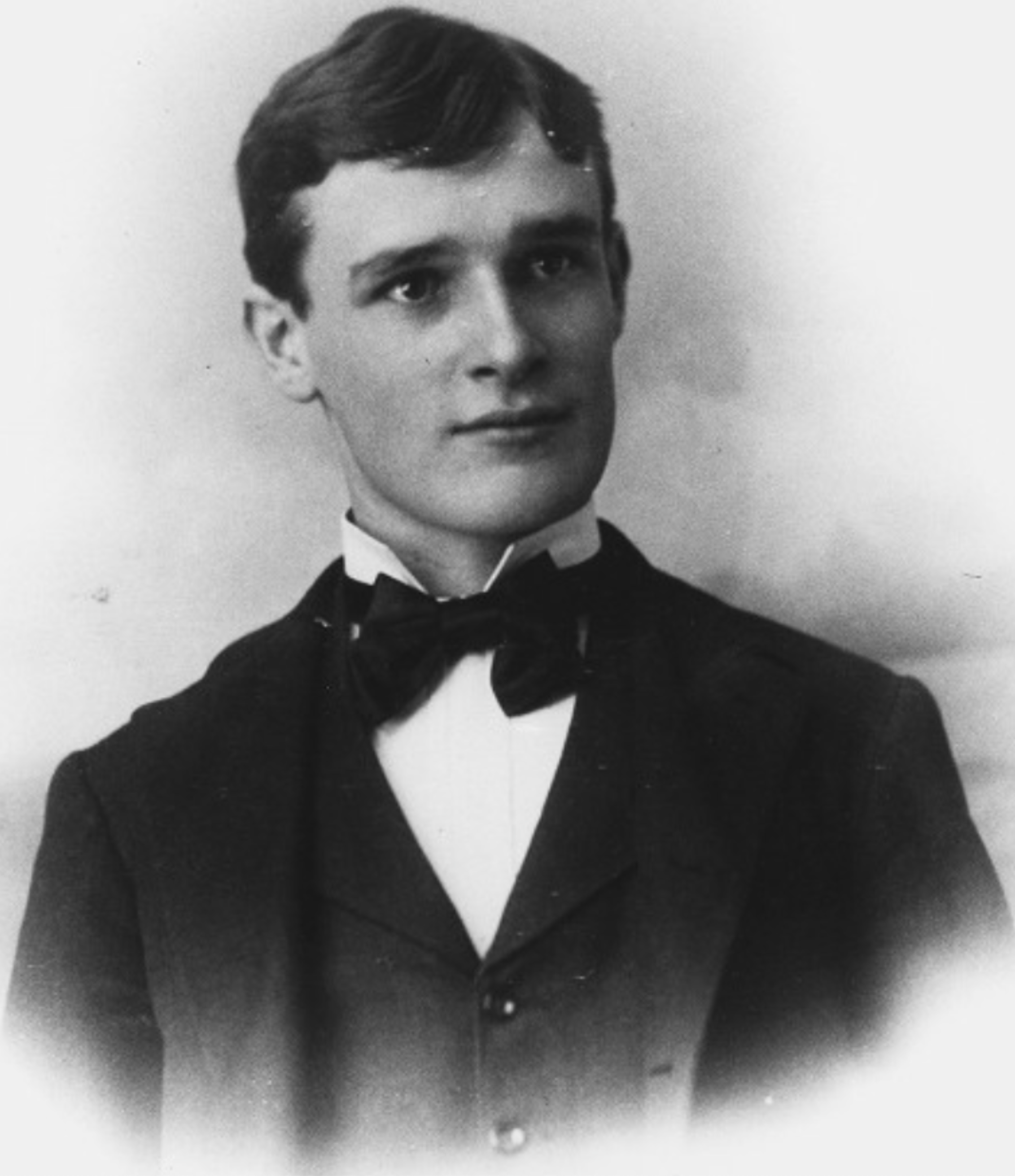
Oscar H. Renner c.1900

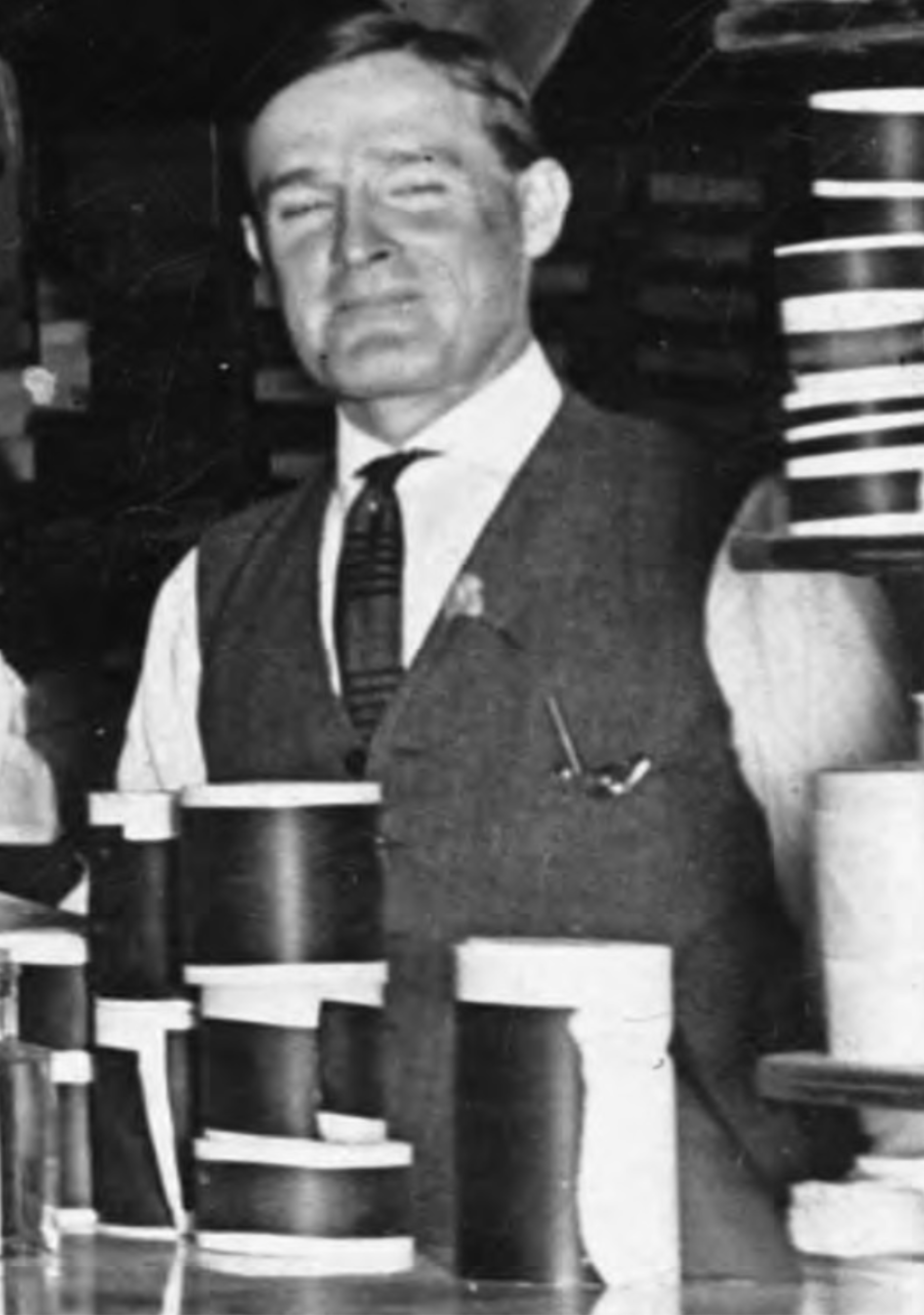
August Schumacher at S.Q.R., 1911
