= M. Eugene Durfee =

American architect

Morien Eugene Durfee
- Born: 1885; Chippewa Falls, Wisconsin, US
- Died: 1941 (aged 55–56); Long Beach, California, US
- Occupation: Architect
- Practice: Bresemann & Durfee; M. Eugene Durfee
- Buildings: Grand Theatre; Chapman Building; Kraemer Building, Georgian Hotel

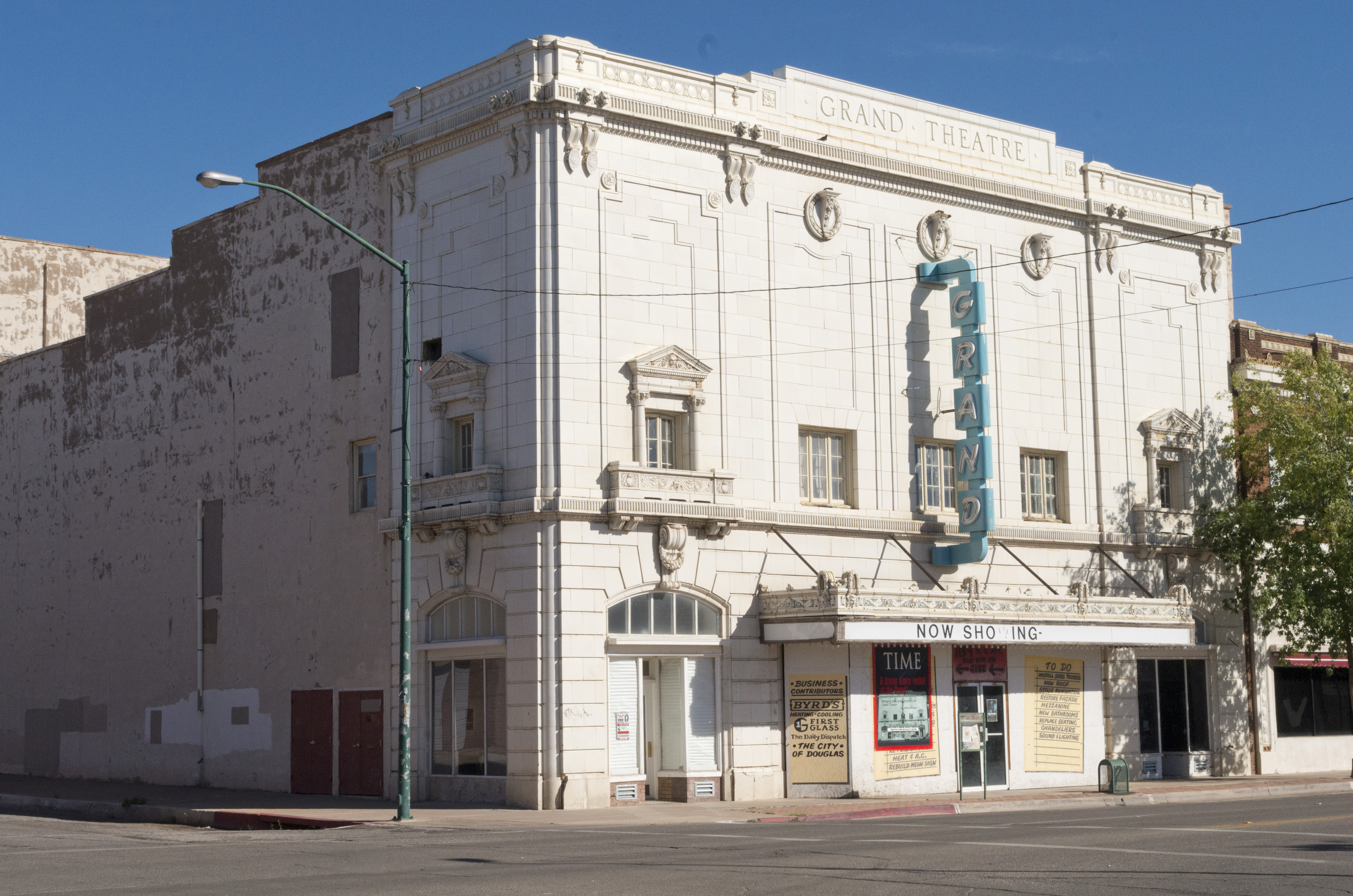
Grand Theatre, Douglas, Arizona, 1918.

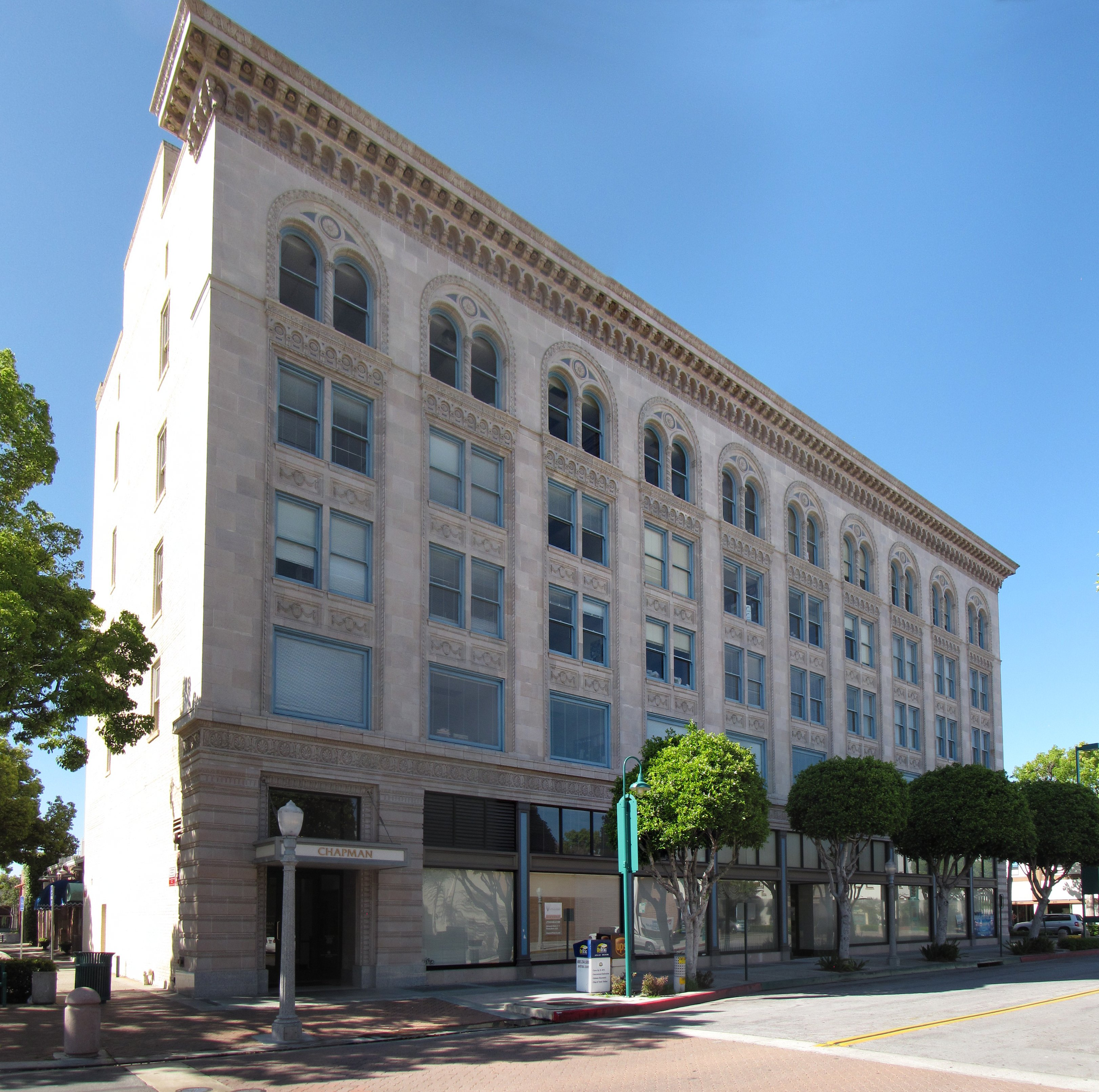
Chapman Building, Fullerton, 1923.

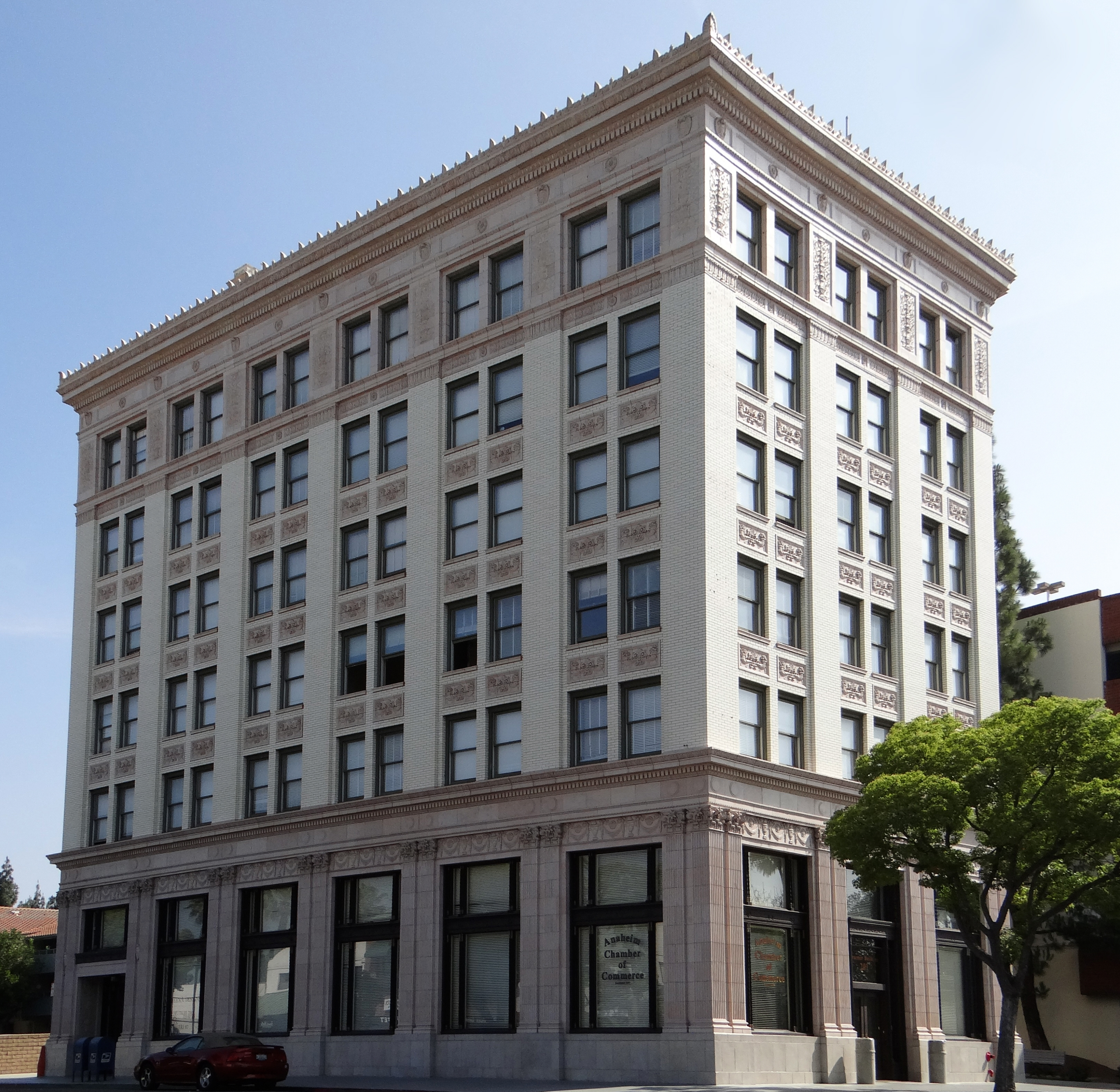
Kraemer Building, Anaheim. 1923.

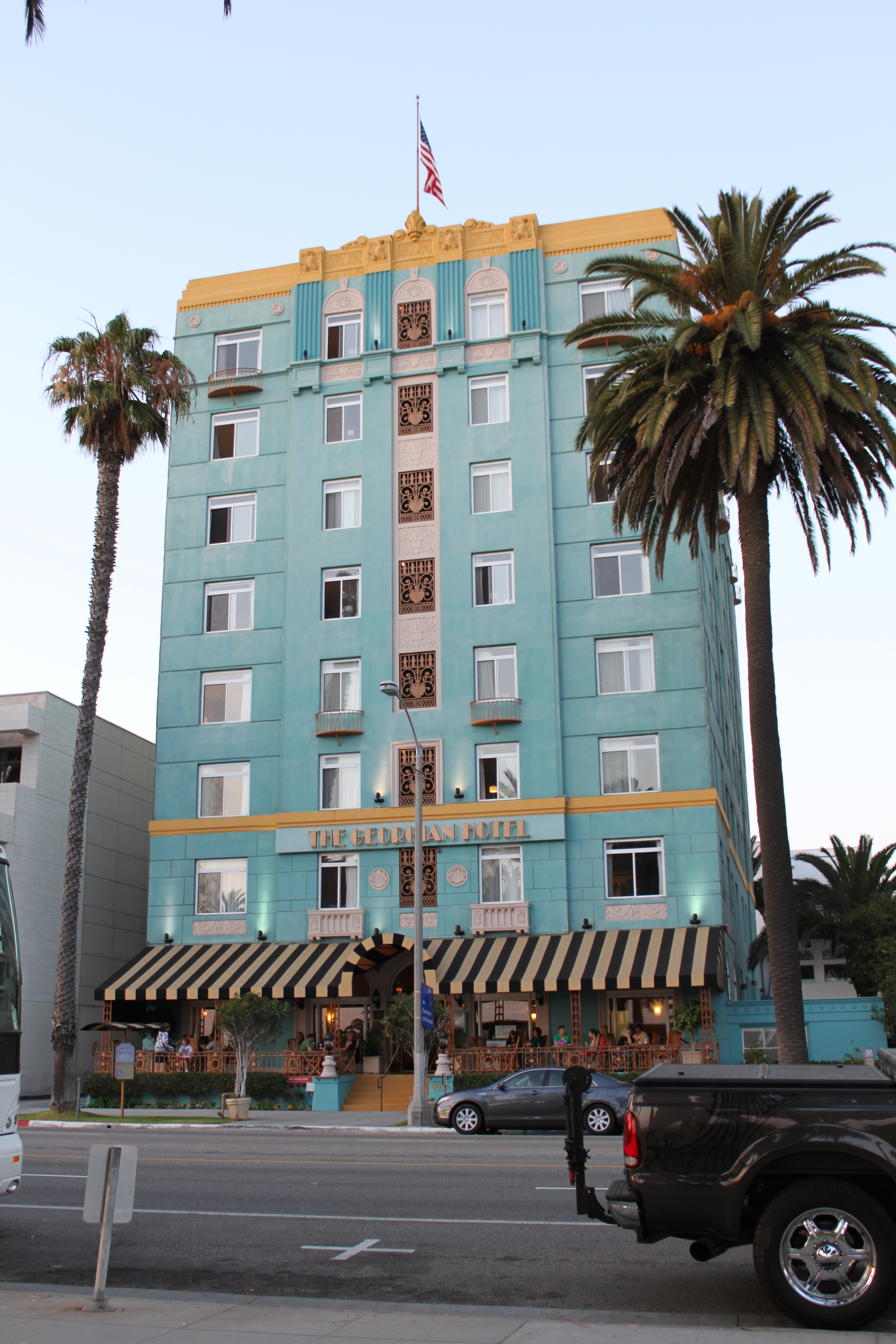
Georgian Hotel, Santa Monica, 1930.

M. Eugene Durfee (1885-1941) was an American architect prominent in Orange County, California.

== Life and career ==
Morien Eugene Durfee was born in Chippewa Falls, Wisconsin in 1885. In 1897 his family moved to Seattle, Washington, where Durfee was educated. Around 1903, at the age of 18, Durfee went to San Francisco to work for architects Shea & Shea, who were known for their commercial buildings. Three years later he returned to Seattle. In 1909 he formed a partnership in Seattle with Emmanuel J. Bresemann, whom he had known in San Francisco. In late 1913, Durfee took an extended trip to Southern California to visit his wife's family. Interested in the opportunities that it offered, Bresemann & Durfee was dissolved and Durfee moved south to Los Angeles. By early 1914 he was living and practicing in Anaheim.

As an architect, Durfee had a major impact on the physical character of Anaheim, plus the nearby cities of Fullerton and Santa Ana. However, most of downtown Anaheim (and thus Durfee's buildings) was destroyed by urban renewal in the 1980s.

Durfee relocated to Tucson, Arizona in 1921, but returned only a few months later. Other than that, he remained in Anaheim until 1927, when he moved to Los Angeles, with offices in the Commercial Exchange Building. By the time of his death on December 26, 1941, he was working in Long Beach, California.

== Selected works ==
=== Bresemann & Durfee, 1909-1913 ===
- 1909 - Pemberton Bros. Houses, 4711-4715-4719 Whitman Ave N and 917 N 48th St, Seattle, Washington
- 1910 - Nemias B. Beck Houses, 5800-5804 15th Ave, Seattle, Washington
- 1910 - Westlake Hotel, 2008 Westlake Ave, Seattle, Washington
- 1911 - St. James Hotel, 640 Johnson St, Victoria, British Columbia
- 1912 - First Congregational (Central Presbyterian) Church, 1170 Thurlow St, Vancouver, British Columbia
- 1913 - Commercial Hotel, 121 Bastion St, Nanaimo, British Columbia
- 1913 - First Congregational Church, 1600 Quadra St, Victoria, British Columbia

=== M. Eugene Durfee, 1914-1941 ===
- 1914 - Yungbluth Building, 145 W Center St, Anaheim, California
  - Demolished.
- 1915 - Hotel Valencia, 182 W Center St, Anaheim, California
  - Burned in 1977.
- 1916 - First National Bank Building, Center St, Anaheim, California
  - Demolished.
- 1918 - Grand Theatre, 1139 N G Ave, Douglas, Arizona
- 1918 - Liberty Theatre, 110 Jerome Ave, Jerome, Arizona
  - Facade altered beyond recognition.
- 1922 - Anaheim City Hall, 204 E Center St, Anaheim, California
  - With Theodore C. Kistner of San Diego. Demolished.
- 1922 - California Hotel (Villa del Sol), 305 N Harbor Blvd, Fullerton, California
  - With Frank K. Benchley of Fullerton.
- 1923 - Chapman Building, 110 E Wilshire Blvd, Fullerton, California
- 1923 - Kraemer Building, 76 S Claudina St, Anaheim, California
- 1926 - Pickwick Hotel (orig. El Torre Hotel), 225 S Los Angeles St (now Anaheim Blvd), Anaheim, California
  - Demolished in 1988.
- 1927 - Amphitheatre, Pearson Park, Anaheim, California
- 1927 - Builder's Exchange Building, 1505 4th St, Santa Monica, California
- 1928 - El Cortez Apartments, 475 S New Hampshire Ave, Los Angeles, California
- 1929 - Central Tower Building, 1424 4th St, Santa Monica, California
- 1929 - Fox Tucson Theatre, 17 W Congress St, Tucson, Arizona
- 1930 - Georgian Hotel, 1415 Ocean Ave, Santa Monica, California
