= Commercial Exchange Building =

Building in Los Angeles, California

Coordinates: 34°2′40″N 118°15′23″W

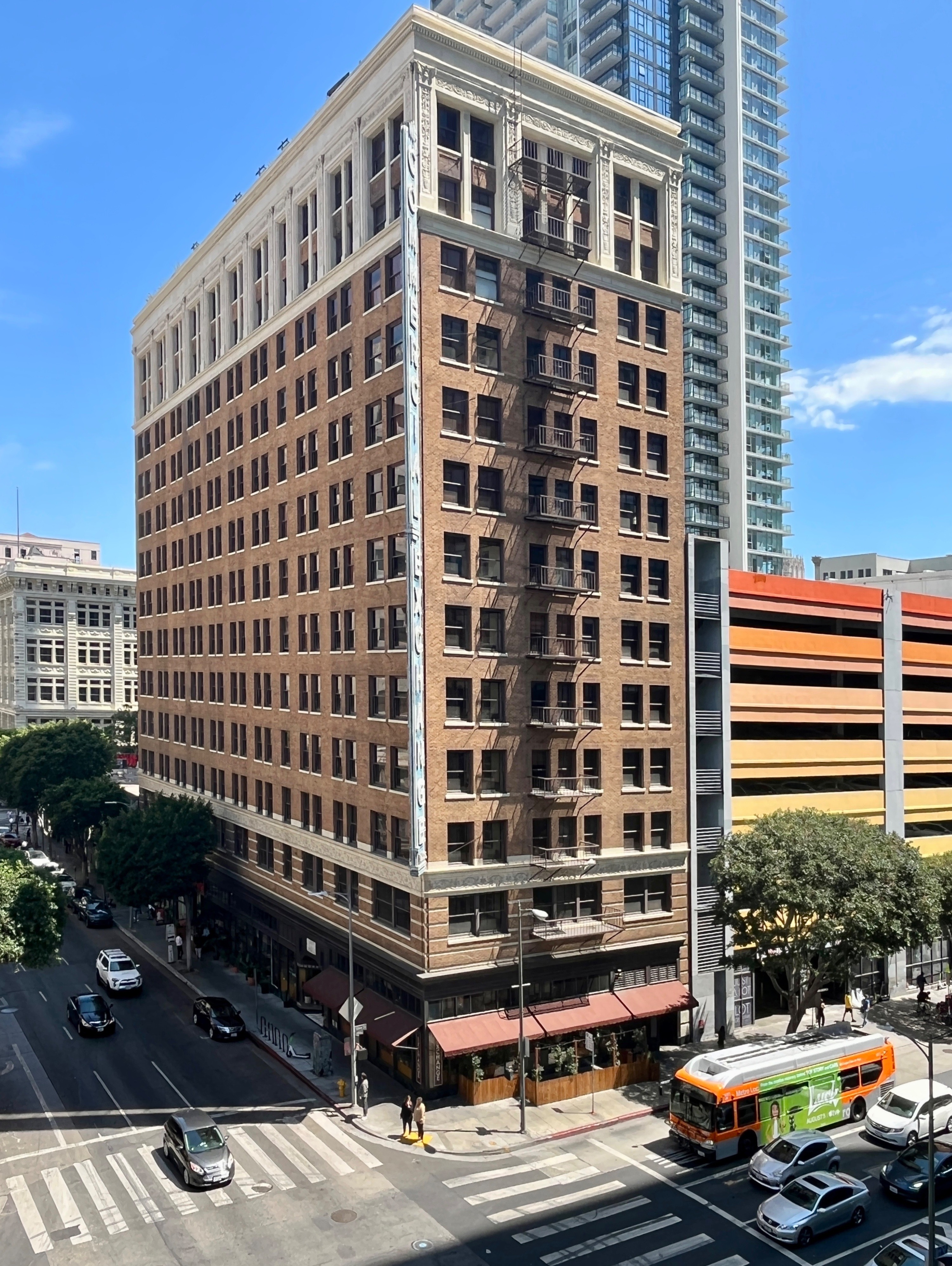

General information
- Location: 416 West 8th Street, Los Angeles, California, United States
- Completed: 1924
- Owner: Sydell Group

Design and construction
- Architect: Walker and Eisen
- Commercial Exchange Building
- U.S. National Register of Historic Places
- Area: less than one acre
- NRHP reference No.: 100004117
- Added to NRHP: June 26, 2019

The Freehand Los Angeles Hotel, formerly the Commercial Exchange Building, is a historic structure in Los Angeles, California, United States.

== Location ==
The building is located on the corner of Olive Street and 8th Street in Downtown Los Angeles, California.

== History ==
The 13-story building was completed in 1924. It was designed by the architecture firm of Walker and Eisen. The building has the distinction of having been vertically split to permit widening of Olive Street. The building's exterior also holds one of the tallest neon signs in Los Angeles.

To allow the widening of Olive Street in the mid-1930s, a "10-foot slice" was removed from the center of the Commercial Exchange Building and engineers rejoined the remaining halves by sliding the western portion eastward. Total cost of the removal and realignment was $60,000, the Los Angeles Times reported in 1935.

Edgar Rice Burroughs operated his publishing company from offices in the Commercial Exchange Building. The structure also once housed the offices of Owl Drug Company.

In early 2013 the building, which had been vacant for two decades, was put on the market for $14 million. A year later, in 2014, it was acquired by the Sydell Group, with financial backing from AllianceBernstein and Yucaipa Companies, an investment firm owned by billionaire Ronald Burkle. The owners remodeled it into the Freehand Los Angeles Hotel, which opened in June 2017. The building was listed on the National Register of Historic Places in 2019.
