= Samuel Kraemer Building =

- Samuel Kraemer Building (American Savings Bank/First National Bank)
- U.S. National Register of Historic Places
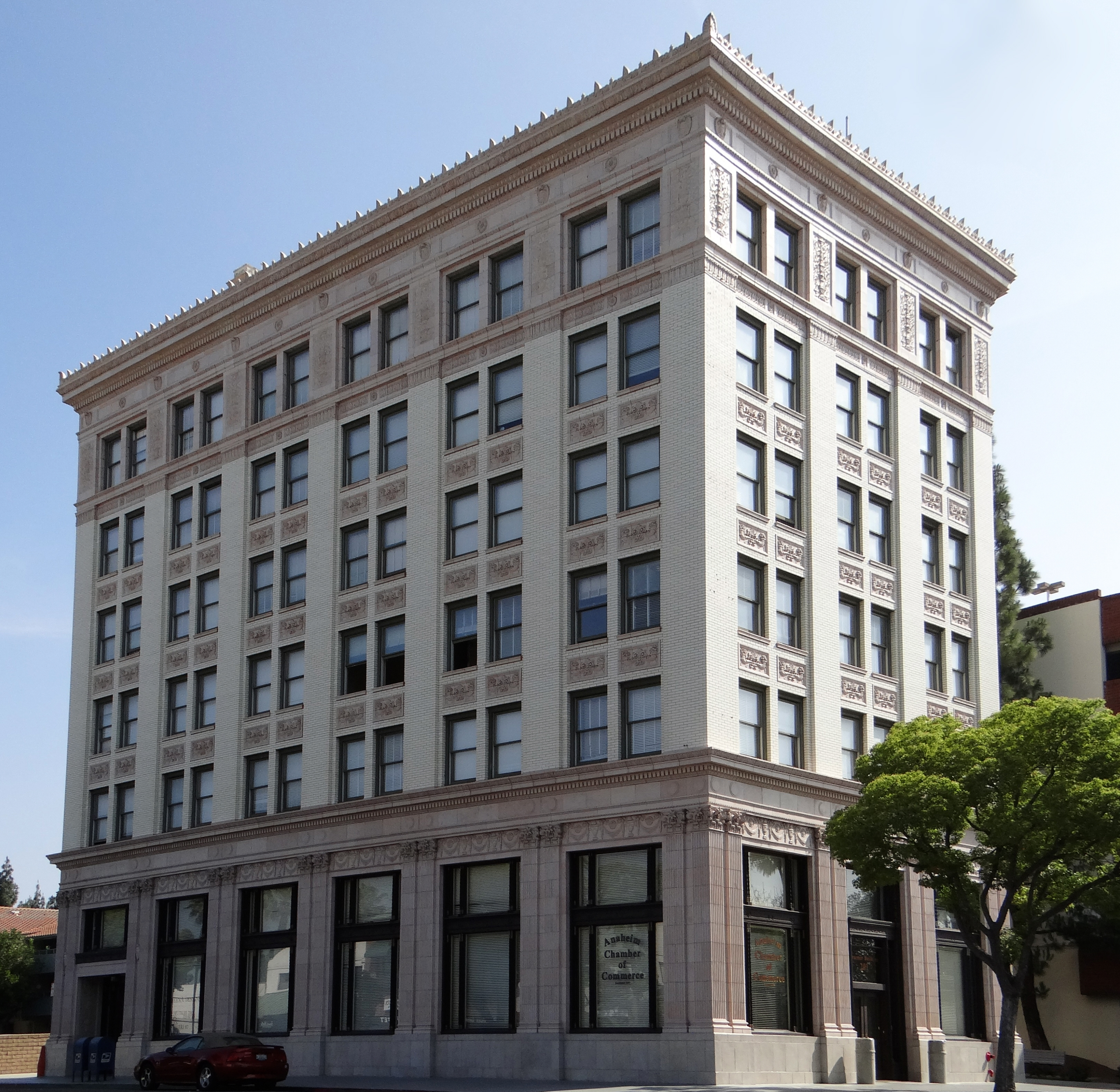

- Location within California Location within the United States
- Nearest city: 76 S. Claudina Street, Anaheim, California
- Coordinates: 33°50′9″N 117°54′46″W
- Built: 1924
- Built by: Wilson & Bever
- Architect: M. Eugene Durfee
- Architectural style: Late 19th And 20th Century Revivals
- NRHP reference No.: 83001217
- Added to NRHP: June 16, 1983

The Samuel Kraemer Building, in Anaheim, California, United States, was built in 1924-1925 by Samuel Kraemer.

It was the first high-rise building in Orange County. Samuel Kraemer 'made a fortune' from oil being discovered on his land. Kraemer invested his wealth in developing much of downtown Anaheim during the 1920s, including this six-story building for the American Savings Bank of Anaheim. The rich use of Gladding-McBean tile on the entire south and west facades arguably made it the most outstanding building in North Orange County when it was built.

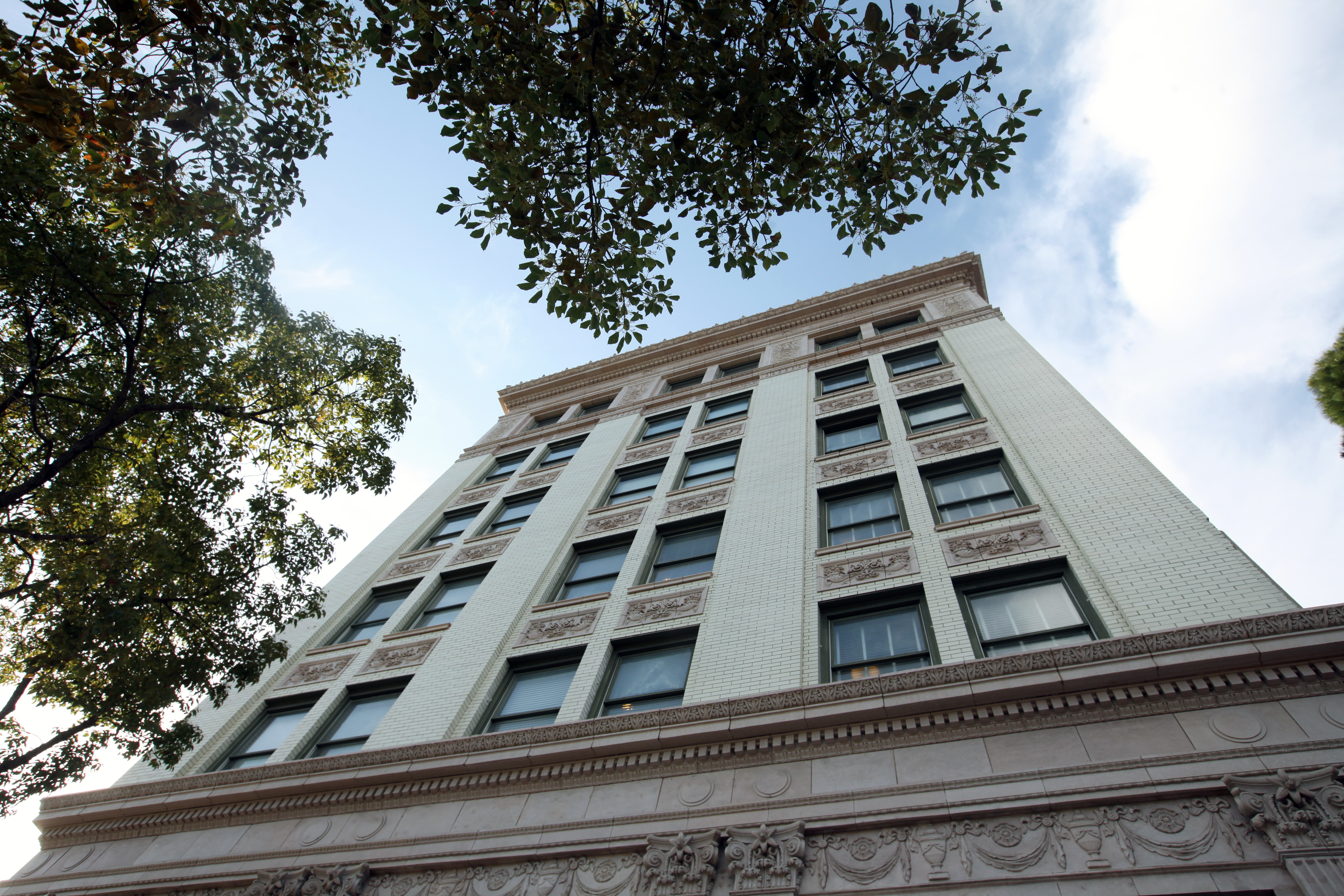

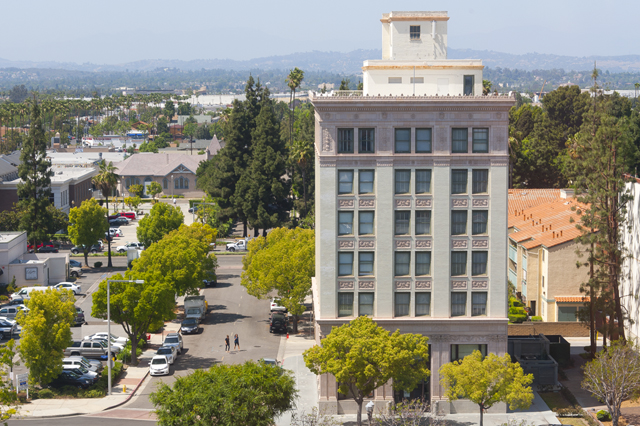

Designed by local architect M. Eugene Durfee, the building was the tallest in Orange County. It remained so for over four decades.

The building once was the headquarters of El Camino Savings and Loan.

The Samuel Kraemer Building was listed on the National Register of Historic Places in 1983.

It was noted to be "an excellent example of Renaissance Revival architecture", and to be one of few buildings surviving in Anaheim that featured extensive use of terra cotta glazed tiles.

== See also ==
- National Register of Historic Places listings in Orange County, California
