= Ainsworth House =

Ainsworth House may refer to:

- Lewis Ainsworth House, Orange, California, listed on the National Register of Historic Places (NRHP) in Orange County
- William W. and Elizabeth J. Ainsworth House, Des Moines, Iowa, NRHP-listed
- Ainsworth House (Thompson Falls, Montana), NRHP-listed in Sanders County
- Capt. John C. Ainsworth House, Oregon City, Oregon, NRHP-listed in Clackamas County
- Maud and Belle Ainsworth House, Portland, Oregon, NRHP-listed
- Oliver N. Ainsworth House, Spearfish, South Dakota, NRHP-listed in Lawrence County
- Ainsworth House (Big Trails, Wyoming), NRHP-listed in Washakie County

== See also ==
- Boatman-Ainsworth House, Lakewood, Washington, a NRHP-listed in Pierce County
