= Lydia D. Killefer School =

School in Orange, California

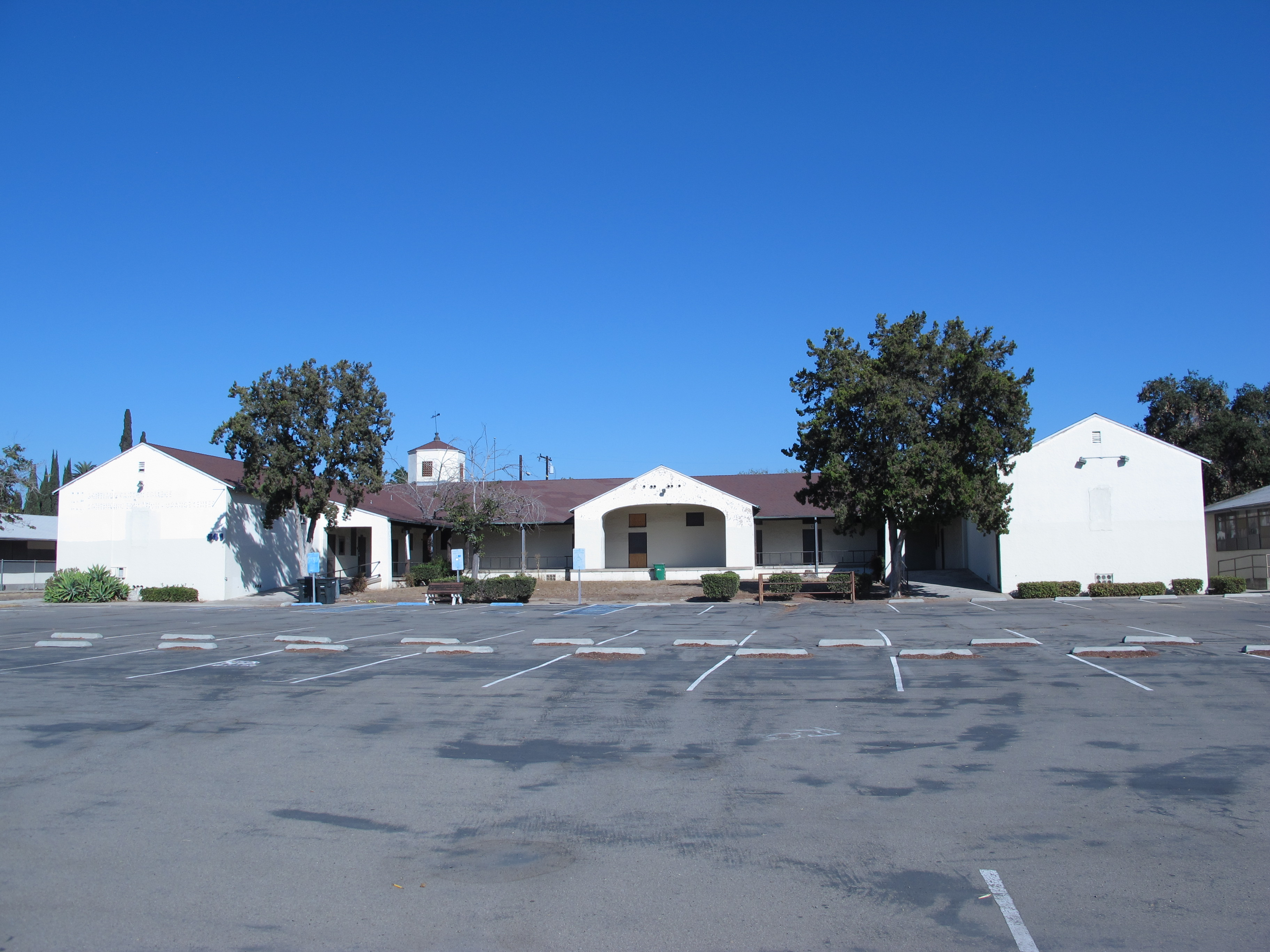

Information
- Established: c. 1931
- Status: Purchased by Chapman University
- Closed: c. 1980
- Locale: Orange, California
- School district: Orange Unified School District

The Lydia D. Killefer School in Orange, California, was constructed in 1931 and listed in 2015 on the National Register of Historic Places administered by the National Park Service. The National Park Service notes the school's significance under Criterion A (Social History) "as an example of institutional development associated with the early twentieth century growth of the Cypress Street Barrio in Orange". Killefer School also is noted by the National Park Service as significant under Criterion C (Architecture) as a rare extant "example of a Spanish Colonial Revival schoolhouse in Southern California" which survived the 1933 Long Beach earthquake.

Lydia D. Killefer School is approximately 31 miles southeast of downtown Los Angeles, and 22 miles northeast of Long Beach, on the east side of North Lemon Street and north of North Lemon Street and West Walnut Avenue. The neighborhood is historically known as the Cypress Street Barrio, a rural colonia settlement for Mexican immigrants who worked in Orange County's citrus industry. The National Park Service notes "there are over two hundred historic homes in the Cypress Street Barrio, over eighty of which are listed in the National Register of Historic Places as contributors to the Old Towne Orange".

The school is named after teacher Lydia D. Killefer, who was in 1928 one of the teachers of Orange with the longest record of service in the city. The City of Orange purchased the five-acre tract for the school, then an orange orchard, for a total of $23,000 or $4600 per acre.

== History ==
The Lydia D. Killefer School was funded through a public bond measure by the City of Orange in the late 1920s and ultimately was under the jurisdiction of the Orange Unified School District. In addition to core curriculum for elementary students, Killefer provided classes for deaf children.

Killefer School served as a polling place in local elections for Orange Precinct 17, beginning in 1933. During a period when Orange County was predominantly farmland and there were few doctors and hospitals, Killefer School partnered with the county health department to provide medical screenings for children.

The Parent Teacher Association for Killefer School formed upon the school's opening and organized large community events as fundraisers. This included productions with the Hollywood acting troupe the Meglin Kiddies performing at the larger Orange Union High School, for which the Killefer School P.T.A. charged adults 25-cents and children 10-cents. The Meglin Kiddies was created by Ethel Meglin, a former Ziegfeld Follies dancer and dance teacher, and stars such as Shirley Temple and Judy Garland got their start with the troupe.

The Killefer School provided space for a variety of community meetings, including the local Brownies and Girl Scouts, who held weekly archery classes at the school, and parenting classes. The parenting classes included topics such as "Mental Hygiene," "Obedience and Discipline, Sex Training," "How to Win Friends and Influence People," and "Inferiority Complex, Day Dreaming, Introversion and Extroversion."

Killefer School was briefly closed in 1940 due to declining enrollment attributed at the time to a decline in the birth rate during the Great Depression years. Parents petitioned the school board to reopen the school.

During World War II, Killefer School provided space for volunteers of the Red Cross to make bandages as part of the war effort.

== School desegregation ==
In 1944, the Cypress Street School in Orange was closed and its predominantly Mexican American students were combined with the white student body at Killefer School, which effectively integrated the school. This desegregation occurred three years before the landmark Mendez v. Westminster ruling, which required schools in California to end segregation.

Both the Cypress Street School, a segregated school for Mexican American children, and the Killefer School opened in the same neighborhood in 1931. In the first half of the Twentieth Century, the majority of public schools in California practiced segregation. Mexican American children commonly were provided lesser school buildings, less experienced teachers and outdated materials. This perpetuated the social ideology of mental inferiority, the narrow definition of who is considered American, and created language barriers.

Killefer School was one of the first schools in California to desegregate. The civil rights history of the school is noted by the National Park Service as meeting the National Register of Historic Places requirements for the context “Making a Democracy: Latino Struggles for Inclusion of the Latinos in Twentieth Century California".

== School closure ==
Killefer School was closed by the Orange Unified School District in 1980, but remained in use by Santiago Canyon College until the early 2000s.

== School sale and historic preservation ==
In April 2014, the Orange Unified School District board declared the Killefer School as surplus property and voted to sell the property for residential development, which would result in demolition or significant change to its historic features. The development proposals were opposed by local historic preservation groups.

The listing of the Killefer School in 2015 on the National Register of Historic Places confirmed its significance as a historic resource established some protection.

On January 16, 2020, the Orange Unified School District board approved a due diligence and escrow period for the sale of the Killefer School property to Chapman University, in Orange, California. Some community members are concerned the purchase will expand Chapman University's footprint in the Old Towne Orange Historic District and that there may be restrictions to public access of the historic property. Chapman University previously purchased the Cypress Street School property in the Cypress Street Barrio for a university department and while the University installed a historic plaque, they have restricted public access.
