= El Modena, California =

Unincorporated area and neighborhood in Orange County, California

- Unincorporated community Census designated place
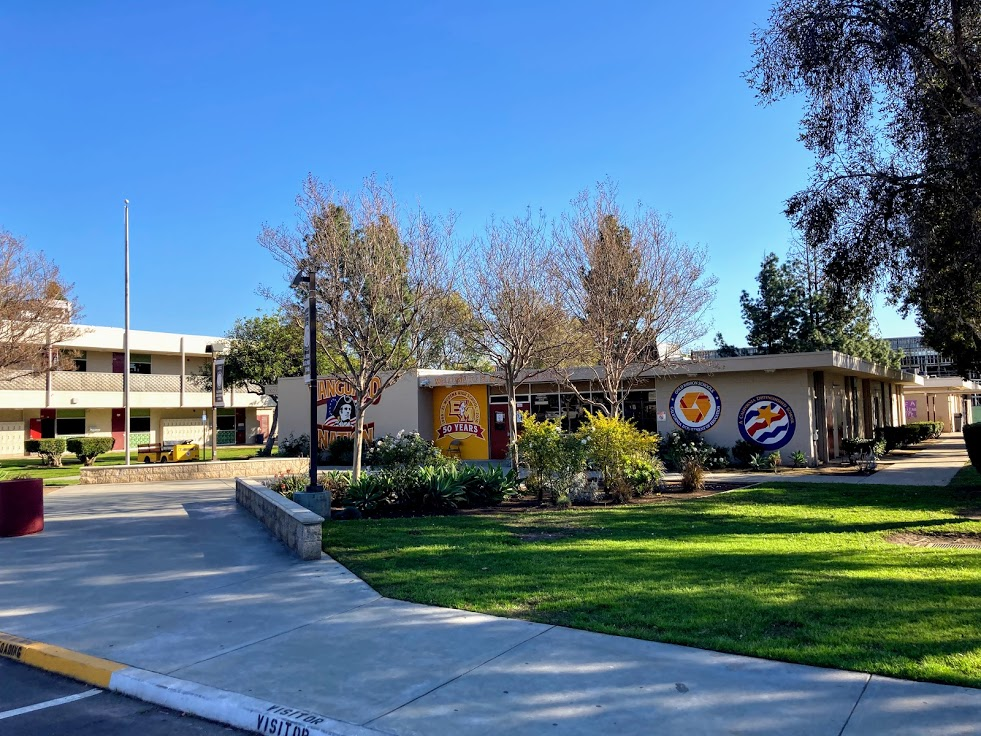
- Interactive map of El Modena, California
- Coordinates: 33.78778°N 117.80861°W

Population
  - Total: 11,045

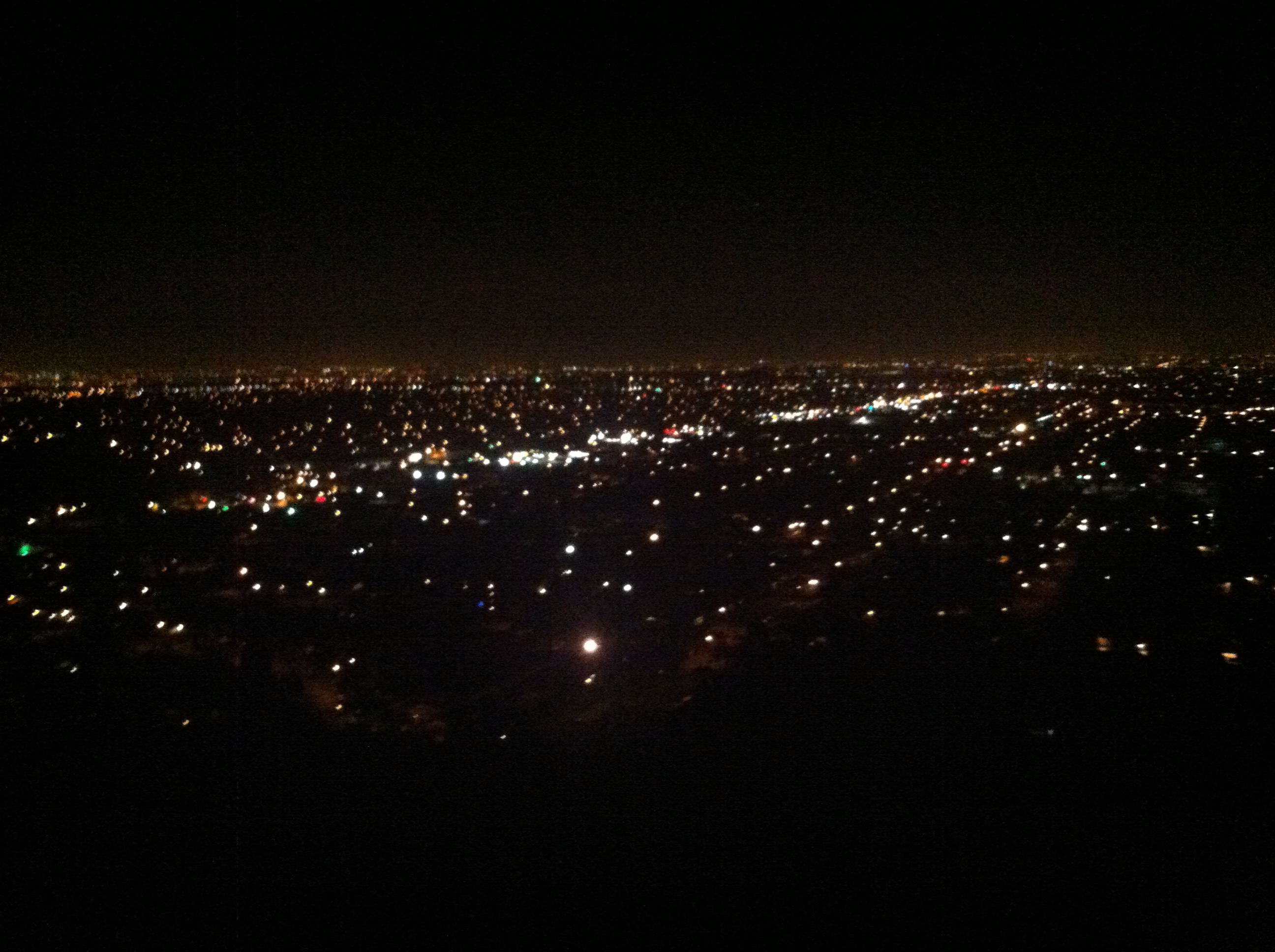
View from a trail in the El Modena Open Space at night. Most of northwest Orange County can be seen here.

El Modena (/məˈdiː.nə/ el MOH-duh-nuh) is an unincorporated community and census designated place (CDP) surrounding El Modena High School and within the city of Orange in Orange County, California, United States and the surrounding unincorporated county area. It is located near and east of the intersection of Hewes Street and Chapman Avenue. Much of the area was annexed by Orange in the 1960s and 1970s, but there are still enclaves of unincorporated county land to the east of the high school. The neighborhood is named after Modena, Italy, plus the Spanish article el.

== History ==
The area was historically, and remains, a barrio or colonia settled by Hispanics of Mexican heritage, as well some Californio and Spanish American settlers in the first half of the 19th century (1790-1850) before the annexation of California by the United States during the Mexican American War (1846-1848). In 1883 Quaker settlers arrived and established a local chapter of the Society of Friends.

El Modena's agricultural days have had a rich cultural impact on the town's history. The Southern Pacific Railroad formerly had an El Modena Station, located off La Veta Avenue, just south of the present-day La Veta Park. Between the time of its foundation in the 1880s to the suburban development boom in the late 1950s, El Modena was an area filled with citrus groves. Roses grown and shipped to Eastern markets were also a major part of the agricultural industry. It is now fully urbanized with the majority of its residents being low to middle income families; the annexed areas of the city became upper income in the real estate booms of the 1990s and 2000s (decade). The original Quaker church still exists and currently operates as a Mexican restaurant.

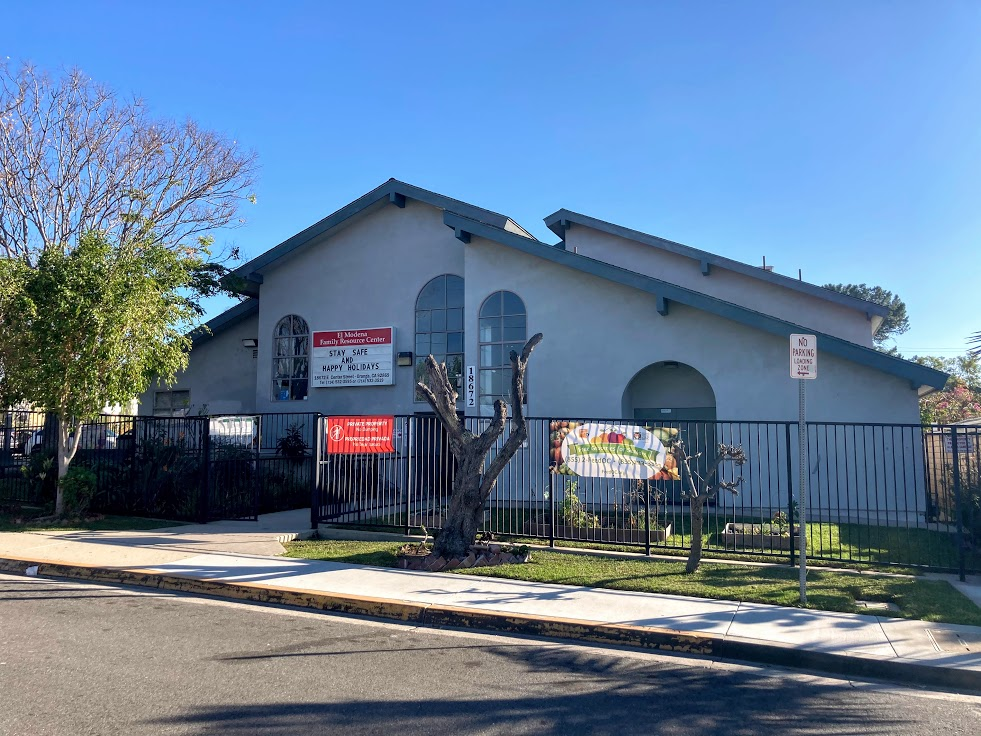
El Modena Family Resource Center, on Center Avenue

Like the trailer parks of western Santa Ana facing the Santa Ana River, and Panorama Heights within Orange and facing Tustin, the El Modena neighborhood is among the poorest parts of Orange County. By the 1970s, much of the older residential areas were poorly maintained: No paved streets, no gutters or sewer caps, poorly dimmed street lighting and mobile home parks without proper utilities. As time progressed, however, El Modena's living environment has gradually improved.

In June 1993, the El Modena Family Resource Center opened to combat gang violence in the area. The project valiantly succeeded, and gang related crime dropped drastically, as well as violent incidents. The center and surrounding neighborhood is declared neutral turf by the members of the rival Pearl Street and Varrio Modena Locos gangs, mutually agreeing on keeping relations between members peaceful when in the area.

== Demographics ==
El Modena was listed as a census designated place as of November 2024.

== Schools ==
- Esplanade Elementary School
- Eldorado Emerson Private School
- El Modena High School

== In literature ==
Kim Stanley Robinson's novel Pacific Edge is set in El Modena circa 2065.
