= Eldorado Emerson Private School =

Eldorado Emerson Private School, Eldorado School for the Gifted Child and Emerson Honors High School

Location
- 4100 East Walnut Avenue, El Modena; Orange, California 92869; United States; 33°47′40″N 117°48′34″W

Information
- Other names: Eldorado School; Emerson Choice Academy
- Type: Private school
- Established: 1959
- Founder: Glory Ludwick
- Closed: June 30, 2020
- NCES School ID: 00078656
- Grades: 6–12
- Gender: Co-educational
- Enrollment: 99 (2017–2018)
- Student to teacher ratio: 8.4
- Website: www.eldoradoemerson.org

Eldorado Emerson Private School (also known as Eldorado School, Eldorado School for the Gifted Child and Emerson Honors High School, and Emerson Choice Academy) was a co-educational private school in El Modena, Orange, California, United States. It was established in 1959 as a school for the gifted by Glory Ludwick. It closed permanently in June 2020.

== History ==
Eldorado Emerson Private School was established in 1959, originally in Fullerton, California, as a school for the gifted by Dr. Glory Ludwick, M.D. (University of California Medical School), a psychiatrist who, according to the Orange County Register, surrounds herself with fantastical objects including a unicorn, giving off the aura of "a magician". It moved to Orange, California in 1963.

The school began with a student body of 40 children at its launch, each with IQs of 120 or higher, a student–teacher ratio of 15:1, and music classes taught by Frieda Belinfante, then-conductor of the Orange County Philharmonic Orchestra. Ludwick founded the school as an answer to the frustrations about how "students with school problems were being allowed to progress all the time within the school system" with "nothing being done about it". The educator also created her own series of books to teach children reading, the Pigglepug and Mopinset series, due to her frustration with the materials then available. Ludwick tried to prevent students from writing while learning to read, believing it caused confusion. The school has always taught French, Spanish and other languages. Over the years, the school has had around 180–200 students, preschool through grade 12.

By 2010, classes consisted of 10 to 15 students, with 33 teachers and staff and one class per grade level. Unique aspects included classes taking trips overseas, students required to take one of four offered foreign languages and either to play an instrument or to take choir. Music students also studied music history and music theory. Toward the end of its sixty year history, 70% of students were from other countries, including the People's Republic of China and the Republic of China. The school was home to a "Monet Garden".
