= Orange, California =

City in California, United States

- City
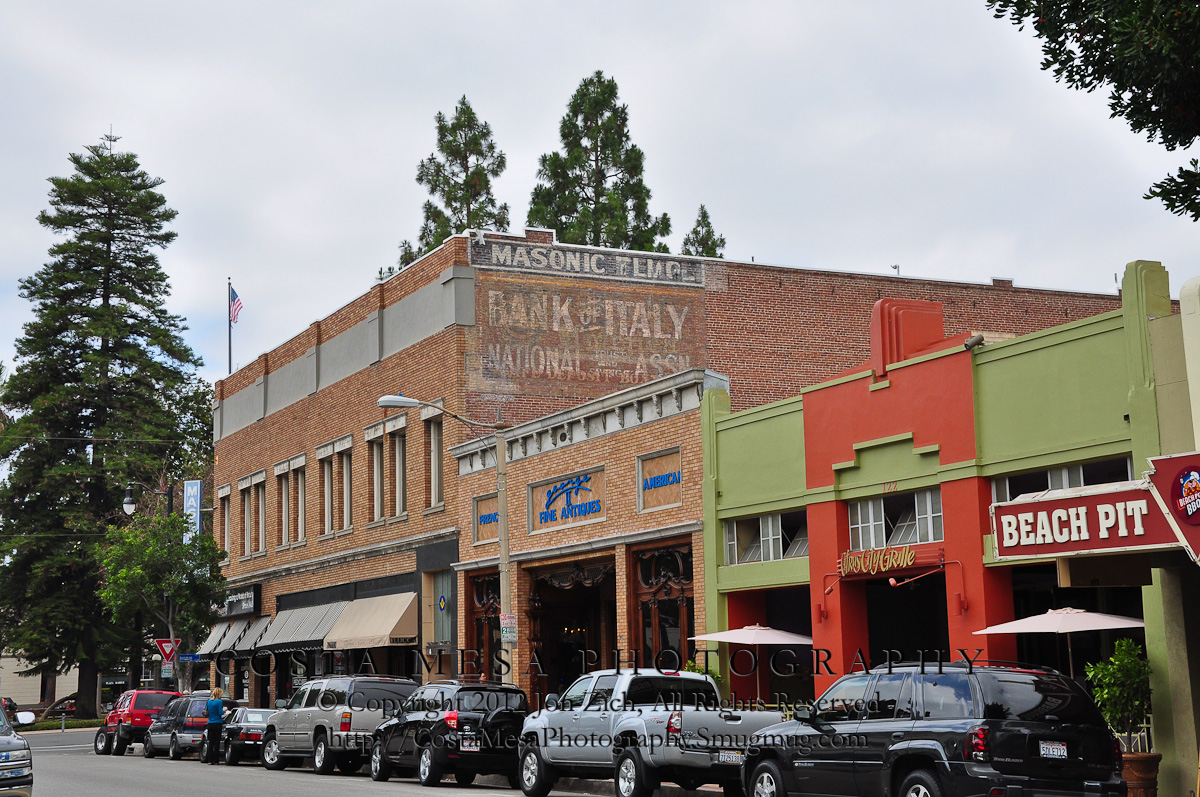
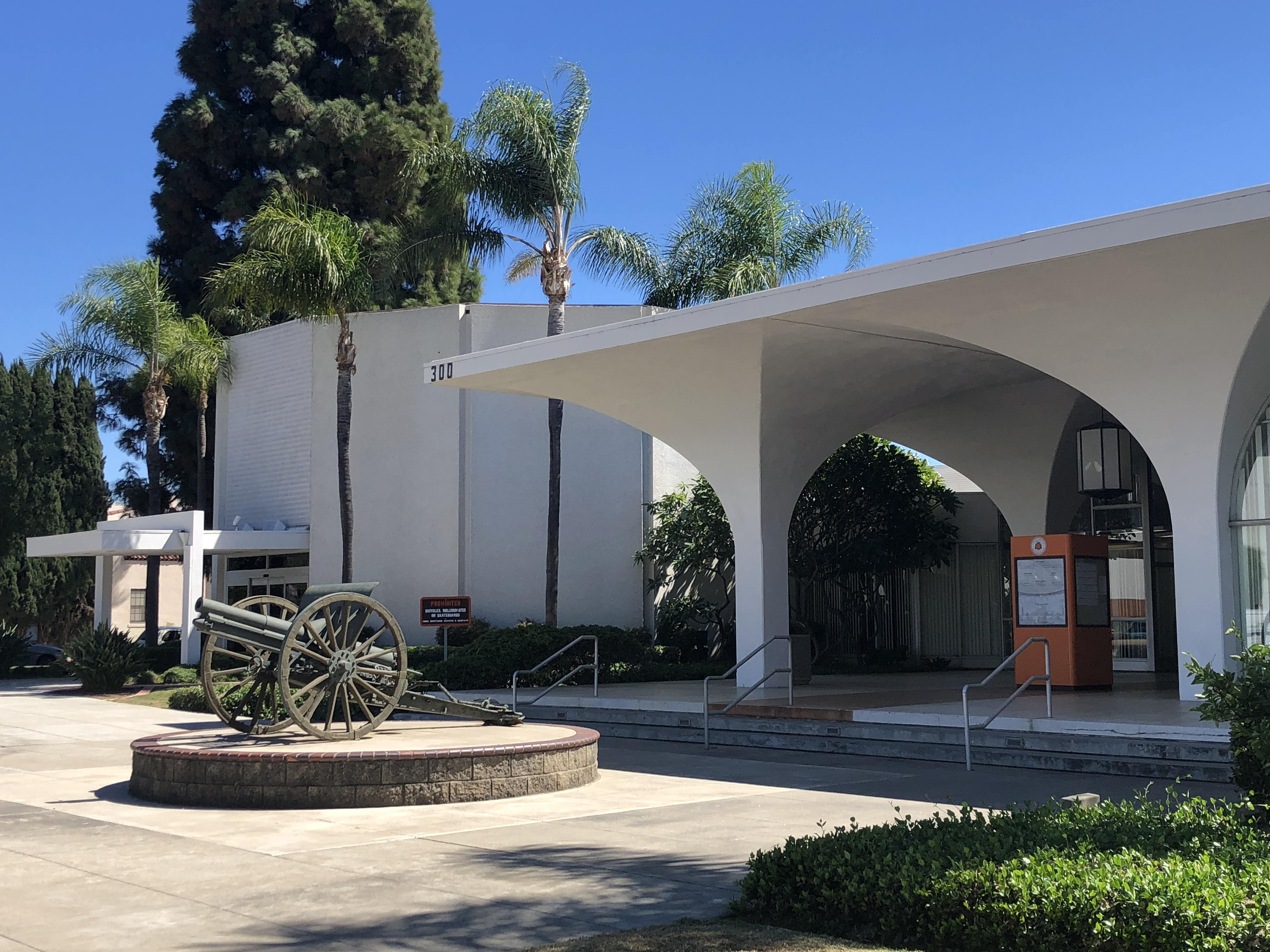
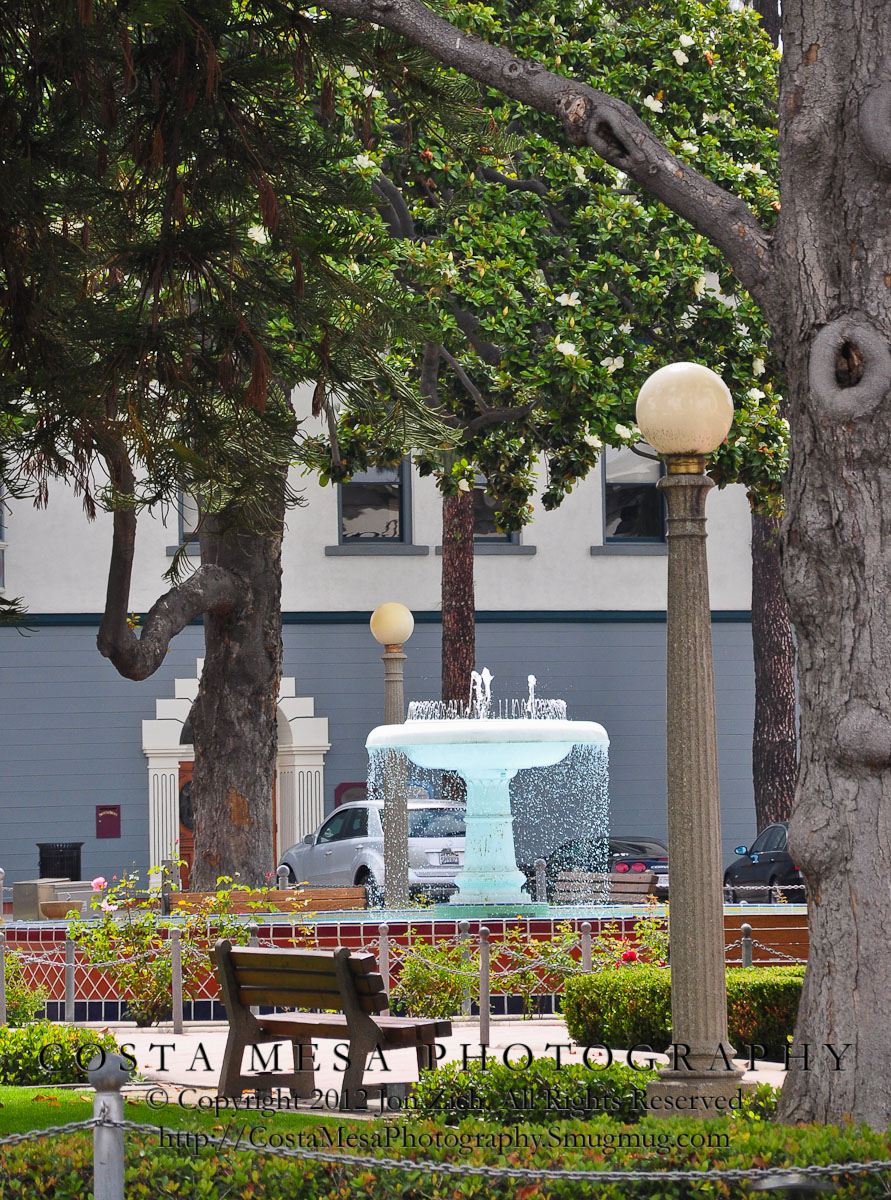
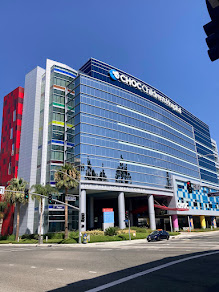
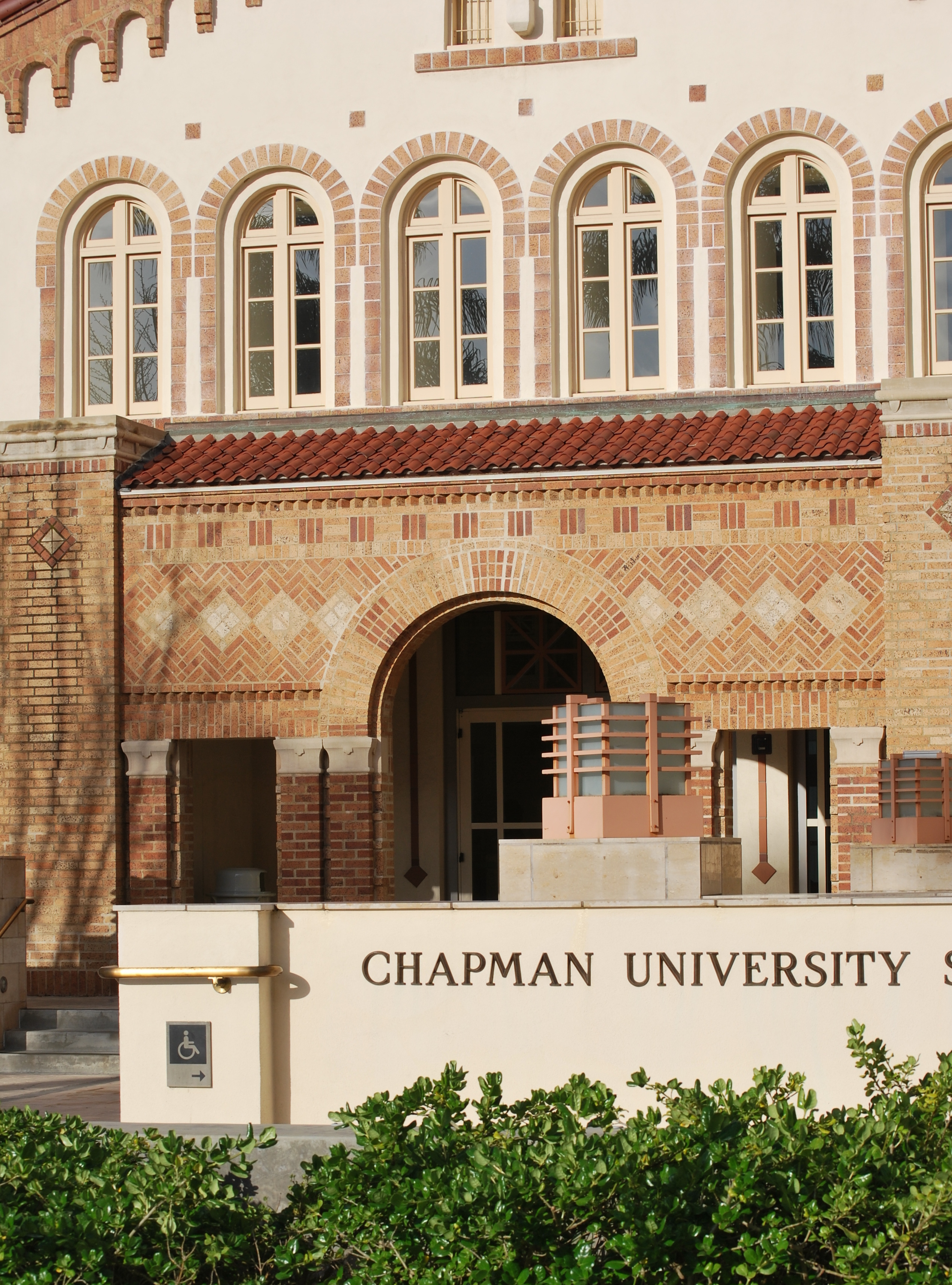
- Clockwise from top: Orange Historic District; City Hall; Chapman University; The Bill Holmes Tower at CHOC Main Campus; Plaza Park.

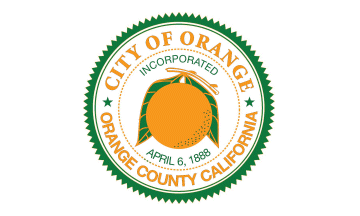
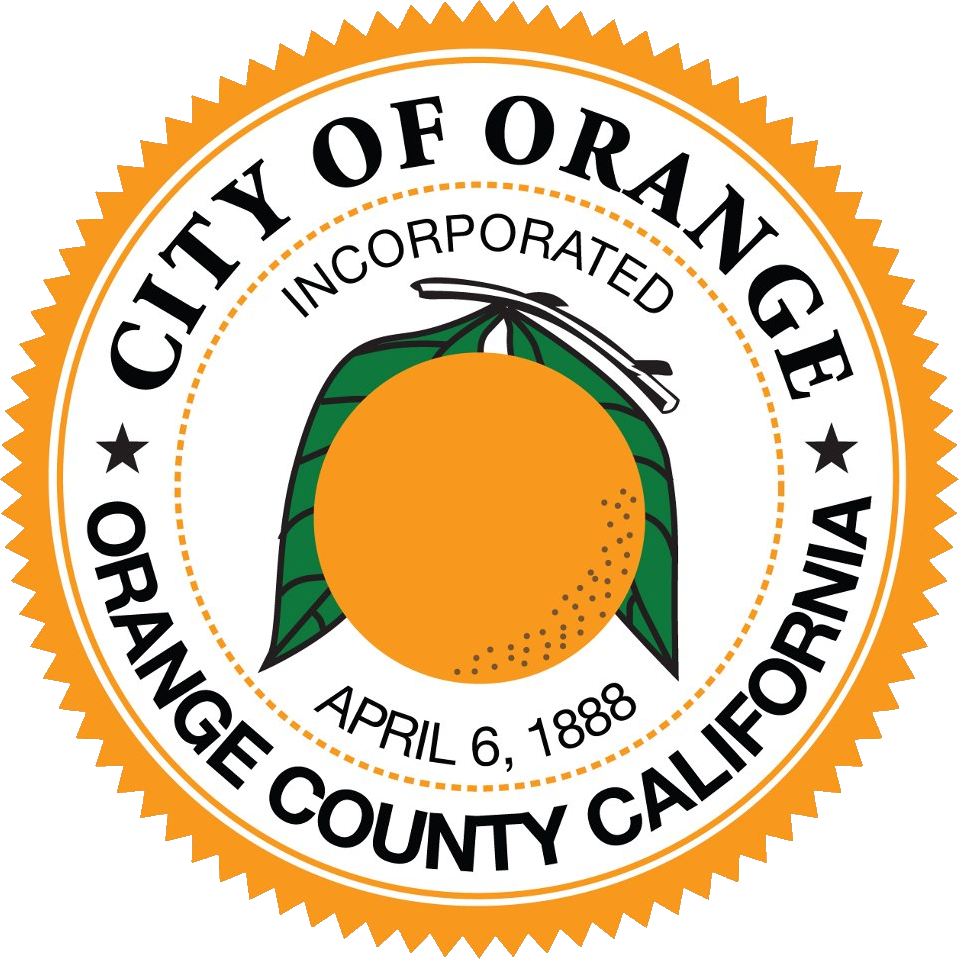
- Flag Seal
- Motto: A Slice of Old Towne Charm
- Interactive map of Orange, California
- Location within Greater Los Angeles Location within California Location within the United States
- Coordinates: 33°48′11″N 117°49′57″W
- Country: United States
- State: California
- County: Orange
- Founded: 1869
- Incorporated: April 6, 1888

Government
  - Type: Council–Manager
  - Mayor: Dan Slater
  - City council: Arianna Barrios, District 1 Jon Dumitru, District 2 Kathy Tavoularis, District 3 Denis Bilodeau, District 4 Ana Gutierrez, District 5 John Gyllenhammer, District 6
  - City treasurer: Richard Rohm
  - City Manager: Jarad Hildenbrand

Area
  - Total: 25.82 sq mi (66.87 km^{2})
  - Land: 25.67 sq mi (66.48 km^{2})
  - Water: 0.15 sq mi (0.39 km^{2}) 0.58%
- Elevation: 190 ft (58 m)

Population (2020)
  - Total: 139,911
  - Rank: 7th in Orange County; 43rd in California; 208th in the United States
  - Density: 5,451.6/sq mi (2,104.87/km^{2})
- Time zone: UTC−08:00 (Pacific)
  - Summer (DST): UTC−07:00 (PDT)
- ZIP Codes: 92856–92869
- Area codes: 657/714
- FIPS code: 06-53980
- GNIS feature IDs: 1652765, 2411325
- Website: cityoforange.org

Orange is a city located in northern Orange County, California, United States. It is approximately 3 miles (4.8 km) north of the county seat, Santa Ana. Orange is unusual in this region because many of the homes in its Old Town District were built before 1920. While many other cities in the region demolished such houses in the 1960s, Orange decided to preserve them. The small city of Villa Park is surrounded by the city of Orange. The population of Orange was 139,911 as of 2020.

== History ==
Members of the Tongva and Juaneño/Luiseño ethnic group long inhabited this area. After the 1769 expedition of Gaspar de Portolá, an expedition out of San Blas, Nayarit, Mexico, led by Father Junípero Serra, named the area Vallejo de Santa Ana (Valley of Saint Anne). On November 1, 1776, Mission San Juan Capistrano became the area's first permanent European settlement in Alta California, New Spain.

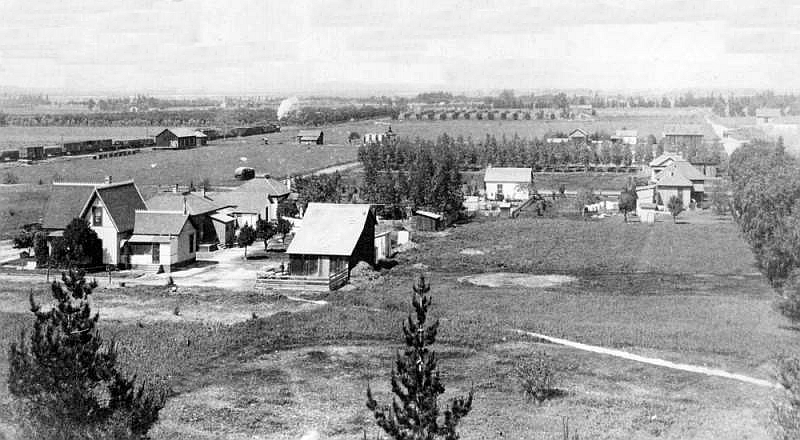
Orange, 1891

In 1801, the Spanish Empire granted 62,500 acres (253 km^{2}) to José Antonio Yorba, which he named Rancho San Antonio. Yorba's great rancho included the lands where the cities of Olive, Orange, El Modena, Villa Park, Santa Ana, Tustin, Costa Mesa and Newport Beach stand today. Smaller ranchos evolved from this large rancho, including the Rancho Santiago de Santa Ana. Don Juan Pablo Grijalva, a retired known Spanish soldier and the area's first landowner, was granted permission in 1809 by the Spanish colonial government to establish a rancho in "the place of the Arroyo de Santiago".

=== American era ===
After the Mexican–American War, Alta California was ceded to the United States by Mexico with the signing of the Treaty of Guadalupe Hidalgo in 1848, and though many Californios lost titles to their lands in the aftermath, Grijalva's descendants retained ownership through marriages to Anglo-Americans.

Since at least 1864, Los Angeles attorneys Alfred Chapman and Andrew Glassell, together and separately, held about 5,400 acres (22 km^{2}) along both sides of the Santiago Creek (Glassell also had a 4,000-acre (16 km^{2}) parcel where Costa Mesa is today). Water was the key factor for the location of their townsite (bordered by Almond Avenue on the south, Lemon Street on the west, Glassell Street on the east, and Maple Avenue on the north). Glassell needed a spot he could irrigate, bringing water down from the Santa Ana Canyon and the quality of the soil may have influenced his choice. Originally, the community was named Richland, but in 1873 Richland got a new name. In the book, Orange, The City 'Round The Plaza by local historian Phil Brigandi, it states, "In 1873 the town had grown large enough to require a post office, so an application was sent to Washington. It was refused, however, as there was (and is) already a Richland, California in Sacramento County. Undaunted, the Richlanders proposed a new name – Orange."

The small town was incorporated on April 6, 1888, under the general laws of the state of California. Orange was the only city in Orange County to be planned and built around a plaza, earning it the nickname Plaza City. Orange was the first developed town site to be served by the California Southern Railroad when the nation's second transcontinental rail line reached Orange County.

The town experienced its first growth spurt during the last decade of the 19th century (as did many of the surrounding communities), thanks to ever-increasing demands for California-grown citrus fruits, a period some refer to as the "Orange Era". Southern California's real estate "boom" of 1886–1888, fueled by railroad rate wars, also contributed to a marked increase in population. Like most cities in Orange County, agriculture formed the backbone of the local economy, and growth thereafter was slow and steady until the 1950s, when a second real estate boom spurred development. Inspired by the development of a region-wide freeway system which connected Los Angeles' urban center with outlying areas like Orange, large tracts of housing were developed from the 1950s to the early 1970s and continues today, albeit at a much slower pace, at the eastern edge of the city.

During the COVID-19 pandemic, the City of Orange approved the closure of North and South Glassell Street to open the Orange Plaza Paseo, where businesses located on each street could open socially-distant outdoor seating and patios. On December 8, 2020, the city council voted unanimously to continue to keep the street closed until state or local restrictions end or by council direction.

== Geography ==
The city has a total area of 25.8 square miles (66.9 km^{2}), 25.7 square miles (66.5 km^{2}) of which is land and 0.15 square miles (0.4 km^{2}) of which is water. The total area is 0.58% water.

=== Climate ===
Southern California is well known for year-round mild to warm weather:

- On average, the warmest month is August.
- The highest recorded temperature was 113 °F (45 °C) in June 2016.
- On average, the coolest month is December.
- The lowest recorded temperature was 25 °F (−4 °C) in December 1990.
- The maximum average precipitation occurs in January.

The period of April through November is warm and dry with average high temperatures of 74 to 84 °F (23 to 29 °C) and lows of 52 to 64 °F (11 to 18 °C). The period of November through March is somewhat rainy, as shown in the table to the right.

Orange

Climate chart (precipitation, max. and min. temperature)
J	F	M	A	M	J	J	A	S	O	N	D
0.8 79 59	1.5 78 59	0.7 70 58	0.9 87 59	0 71 61	0 87 70	0 84 70	0 90 70	0 105 76	0 83 70	0 80 58	0 80 55
- █ Average max. and min. temperatures in °F
- █ Precipitation totals in inches
- Source: Weather Underground
Metric conversion
J	F	M	A	M	J	J	A	S	O	N	D
21 26 15	38 26 15	18 21 14	24 31 15	0 22 16	0 31 21	0 29 21	0 32 21	0 41 24	0 28 21	0 27 14	0 27 13
- █ Average max. and min. temperatures in °C
- █ Precipitation totals in mm

The Orange County area is also subject to the phenomena typical of a microclimate. As such, the temperatures can vary as much as 18 °F (10 °C) between inland areas and the coast, with a temperature gradient of over 1 °F per mile (0.3 °C/km) from the coast inland. California also has a weather phenomenon called "June Gloom" or "May Gray," which sometimes brings overcast or foggy skies in the morning on the coast. Usually, it gives way to sunny skies by noon during late spring and early summer.

The Orange County area averages 15 in (380 mm) of precipitation annually, which mainly occurs during the winter and spring (November through April) with generally light rain showers, but sometimes as heavy rainfall and thunderstorms. Coastal Torrance receives slightly less rainfall, while the mountains receive somewhat more. Snowfall is infrequent in the city basin, but the mountains in the surrounding areas receive snowfall every winter.

Climate data for Orange, California
Month	Jan	Feb	Mar	Apr	May	Jun	Jul	Aug	Sep	Oct	Nov	Dec	Year
Record high °F (°C)	91 (33)	91 (33)	97 (36)	108 (42)	110 (43)	113 (45)	112 (44)	105 (41)	112 (44)	105 (41)	97 (36)	93 (34)	113 (45)
Mean daily maximum °F (°C)	68 (20)	69 (21)	70 (21)	74 (23)	75 (24)	80 (27)	85 (29)	86 (30)	85 (29)	80 (27)	74 (23)	69 (21)	76 (24)
Mean daily minimum °F (°C)	44 (7)	46 (8)	47 (8)	50 (10)	54 (12)	58 (14)	61 (16)	62 (17)	60 (16)	55 (13)	48 (9)	43 (6)	52 (11)
Record low °F (°C)	28 (−2)	29 (−2)	31 (−1)	34 (1)	38 (3)	42 (6)	45 (7)	48 (9)	44 (7)	35 (2)	32 (0)	25 (−4)	25 (−4)
Average precipitation inches (mm)	3.18 (81)	3.08 (78)	2.72 (69)	0.73 (19)	0.25 (6.4)	0.11 (2.8)	0.02 (0.51)	0.12 (3.0)	0.32 (8.1)	0.38 (9.7)	1.15 (29)	1.78 (45)	13.84 (352)

=== Cityscape ===
Old Towne, Orange Historic District, a one square mile around the original plaza, contains many of the original structures built in the period after the city's incorporation. It is a vibrant commercial district containing Orange County's oldest operating bank and many dining and retail amenities. The Historic District was listed on the National Register of Historic Places in 1997, and is the largest National Register District in California. The Old Towne Preservation Association is a non-profit organization that maintains the district.

Orange is unique among the region and the state because it has the second largest concentration of historic buildings. A list of all of the buildings and sites in Orange appears in the National Register of Historic Places. The Civic Center was designed by Welton Becket in 1963.

Though Orange is now a fully developed city, there are still several unincorporated portions of land within the city that have not yet been annexed, including El Modena and North El Modena, Orange Park Acres, and Olive.

=== Biogeography ===
The most common native species: Hairy Sand Verbena, Red Sand Verbena, and Pink Sand Verbena.

== Demographics ==
Historical population
Census	Pop.	Note	%±
1880	679		—
1890	866		27.5%
1900	1,216		40.4%
1910	2,920		140.1%
1920	4,884		67.3%
1930	8,066		65.2%
1940	7,901		−2.0%
1950	10,027		26.9%
1960	26,444		163.7%
1970	77,365		192.6%
1980	91,450		18.2%
1990	110,658		21.0%
2000	128,821		16.4%
2010	136,416		5.9%
2020	139,911		2.6%
2024 (est.)	137,941	▼	−1.4%
U.S. Decennial Census; 1860–1870 1880–1890; 1900 1910 1920; 1930 1940 1950; 1960 1970 1980; 1990 2000 2010; 2020

Orange was first listed as a city in the 1880 United States census.

Orange city, California – Racial and Ethnic Composition Note: the US Census treats Hispanic/Latino as an ethnic category. This table excludes Latinos from the racial categories and assigns them to a separate category. Hispanics/Latinos may be of any race.
Race / Ethnicity (NH = Non-Hispanic)	Pop 1980	Pop 1990	Pop 2000	Pop 2010	Pop 2020	% 1980	% 1990	% 2000	% 2010	% 2020
White alone (NH)	75,612	75,033	70,292	63,805	55,330	82.38%	67.81%	54.57%	46.77%	39.55%
Black or African American alone (NH)	758	1,367	1,798	1,895	2,221	0.83%	1.24%	1.40%	1.39%	1.59%
Native American or Alaska Native alone (NH)	729	414	393	357	289	0.79%	0.37%	0.31%	0.26%	0.21%
Asian alone (NH)	3,074	8,477	11,898	15,116	18,058	3.35%	7.66%	9.24%	11.08%	12.91%
Native Hawaiian or Pacific Islander alone (NH)	3,074	8,477	268	321	328	3.35%	7.66%	0.21%	0.24%	0.23%
Other race alone (NH)	160	89	162	244	666	0.17%	0.08%	0.13%	0.18%	0.48%
Mixed race or Multiracial (NH)	x	x	2,576	2,664	5,444	x	x	2.00%	1.95%	3.89%
Hispanic or Latino (any race)	11,455	25,278	41,434	52,014	57,575	12.48%	22.84%	32.16%	38.13%	41.15%
Total	91,788	110,658	128,821	136,416	139,911	100.00%	100.00%	100.00%	100.00%	100.00%

=== 2020 ===
The 2020 United States census reported that Orange had a population of 139,911. The population density was 5,450.8 inhabitants per square mile (2,104.6/km^{2}). The racial makeup of Orange was 46.5% White, 1.7% African American, 1.3% Native American, 13.1% Asian, 0.3% Pacific Islander, 20.7% from other races, and 16.3% from two or more races. Hispanic or Latino of any race were 41.2% of the population.

The census reported that 95.1% of the population lived in households, 2.6% lived in non-institutionalized group quarters, and 2.3% were institutionalized.

There were 45,382 households, out of which 32.7% included children under the age of 18, 52.4% were married-couple households, 6.6% were cohabiting couple households, 25.3% had a female householder with no partner present, and 15.7% had a male householder with no partner present. 19.4% of households were one person, and 8.5% were one person aged 65 or older. The average household size was 2.93. There were 32,762 families (72.2% of all households).

The age distribution was 20.1% under the age of 18, 12.0% aged 18 to 24, 28.3% aged 25 to 44, 25.0% aged 45 to 64, and 14.6% who were 65 years of age or older. The median age was 37.0 years. For every 100 females, there were 98.3 males.

There were 46,893 housing units at an average density of 1,826.9 units per square mile (705.4 units/km^{2}), of which 45,382 (96.8%) were occupied. Of these, 57.0% were owner-occupied, and 43.0% were occupied by renters.

In 2023, the US Census Bureau estimated that the median household income was $116,945, and the per capita income was $50,759. About 5.4% of families and 9.2% of the population were below the poverty line.

=== 2010 ===
The 2010 United States census reported that Orange had a population of 136,416. The population density was 5,404.7 inhabitants per square mile (2,086.8/km^{2}). The racial makeup of Orange was 91,522 (67.1%) White (46.8% Non-Hispanic White), 2,227 (1.6%) African American, 993 (0.7%) Native American, 15,350 (11.3%) Asian, 352 (0.3%) Pacific Islander, 20,567 (15.1%) from other races, and 5,405 (4.0%) from two or more races. There were 52,014 Hispanic or Latino residents, of any race (38.1%).

The Census reported that 130,163 people (95.4% of the population) lived in households, 2,587 (1.9%) lived in non-institutionalized group quarters, and 3,666 (2.7%) were institutionalized.

There were 43,367 households, out of which 16,303 (37.6%) had children under the age of 18 living in them, 23,572 (54.4%) were opposite-sex married couples living together, 5,260 (12.1%) had a female householder with no husband present, 2,424 (5.6%) had a male householder with no wife present. There were 2,442 (5.6%) unmarried opposite-sex partnerships, and 373 (0.9%) same-sex married couples or partnerships. 8,480 households (19.6%) were made up of individuals, and 3,115 (7.2%) had someone living alone who was 65 years of age or older. The average household size was 3.00. There were 31,256 families (72.1% of all households); the average family size was 3.42.

In Orange, there were 32,096 people (23.5%) under the age of 18, 16,420 people (12.0%) aged 18 to 24, 39,574 people (29.0%) aged 25 to 44, 33,698 people (24.7%) aged 45 to 64, and 14,628 people (10.7%) who were 65 years of age or older. The median age was 34.8 years. For every 100 females, there were 101.5 males. For every 100 females age 18 and over, there were 99.7 males.

There were 45,111 housing units at an average density of 1,787.3 per square mile (690.1/km^{2}), of which 26,319 (60.7%) were owner-occupied, and 17,048 (39.3%) were occupied by renters. The homeowner vacancy rate was 1.1%; the rental vacancy rate was 5.1%. 77,179 people (56.6% of the population) lived in owner-occupied housing units and 52,984 people (38.8%) lived in rental housing units.

During 2009–2013, Orange had a median household income of $78,838, with 11.8% of the population living below the federal poverty line.

=== Crime ===
Crime data showed that Orange was safer than 35% of U.S. cities, and that its violent crime rate of about one per 1,000 residents was lower than the national average of four per 1,000. Its property crime rate was higher, at almost 16 property crimes per 1,000 residents, though still lower than the national and state averages. There were 94 crimes per square mile in Orange, higher than the state average of 83 and national average of about 28.

2020 data indicated that year after year crime had continually decreased by 10%.

On March 31, 2021, four people were killed and two more were injured in a mass shooting at an office complex along Lincoln Avenue in north Orange.

The Uniform Crime Report (UCR), collected annually by the FBI, compiles police statistics from local and state law enforcement agencies across the nation. The UCR records Part I and Part II crimes. Part I crimes become known to law enforcement and are considered the most serious crimes including homicide, rape, robbery, aggravated assault, burglary, larceny, motor vehicle theft, and arson. Part II crimes only include arrest data. The 2023 UCR Data for Orange is listed below:

2023 UCR Data
	Aggravated Assault	Homicide	Rape	Robbery	Burglary	Larceny Theft	Motor Vehicle Theft	Arson
Orange	196	2	14	84	933	1,234	281	8

== Economy ==
=== Largest employers ===
According to the city's 2023 Comprehensive Annual Financial Report, the top employers in the city are:

#	Employer	# of employees
1	University of California, Irvine Medical Center	4,995
2	Children's Hospital of Orange County	3,938
3	Sisters of St. Joseph Hospital	3,500
4	Chapman University	1,300
5	Santiago Canyon College	950
6	CalOptima Health Plans	930
7	City of Orange	800
8	Chapman Integrated Healthcare Holdings	700
9	Orange County Transportation Authority	500
10	Hotel Fera DoubleTree	477

== Arts and culture ==
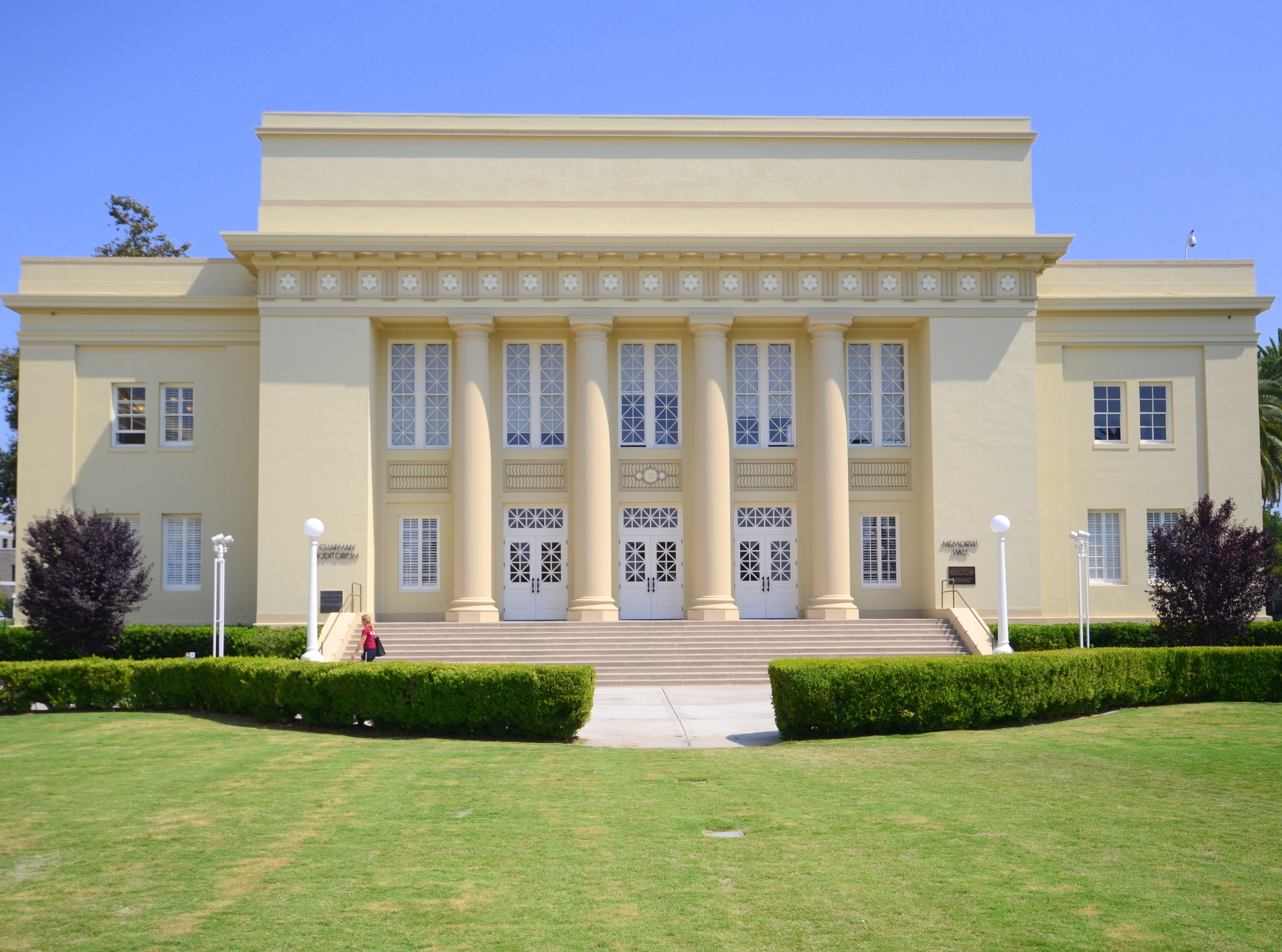
Memorial Hall, on the campus of Chapman University.

=== Points of interest ===
The Orange International Street Fair has occurred annually over Labor Day Weekend in Downtown Orange since 1973. The fair draws an average of 400,000 in attendance every year.

The Orange County Zoo is located in Orange at Irvine Regional Park.

Shopping includes The Village at Orange and The Outlets at Orange, an outdoor shopping and entertainment center that includes a skatepark and bowling center.

The Woman's Club of Orange, organized in 1915, holds an annual flower show. Their clubhouse, built in 1923–1924, is listed on the National Register of Historic Places.

The "Villa Park Orchards Association" packing house, located along the former Atchison, Topeka and Santa Fe Railway mainline, previously was the sole remaining fruit packing operation in Orange County, before the packing house was sold to Chapman University in 2018 for conversion into student housing. The old packing house can still be seen today in its current role as dorming for students.

The Lewis Ainsworth House is a restored house museum.

=== Architectural styles in Old Towne Orange ===
Architectural styles in Old Towne Orange include Bungalow, Craftsman Bungalow, Arts and Crafts Movement, Hip roof cottage, Mediterranean Revival architecture, Prairie Style architecture, Spanish Colonial Revival architecture, and Victorian architecture.

== Registered Historic Places ==
- C Z Culver House
- Cypress Street Schoolhouse
- First Baptist Church of Orange
- Irvine Park
- Lewis Ainsworth House
- Lydia D. Killefer School
- Old Towne Orange Historic District
- Olive Civic Centre
- Orange Intermediate School– Central Grammar School
- Orange Union High School
- Parker House
- Plaza Historic District
- Porter–French House
- St John’s Lutheran Church
- The Plaza

== Sports ==
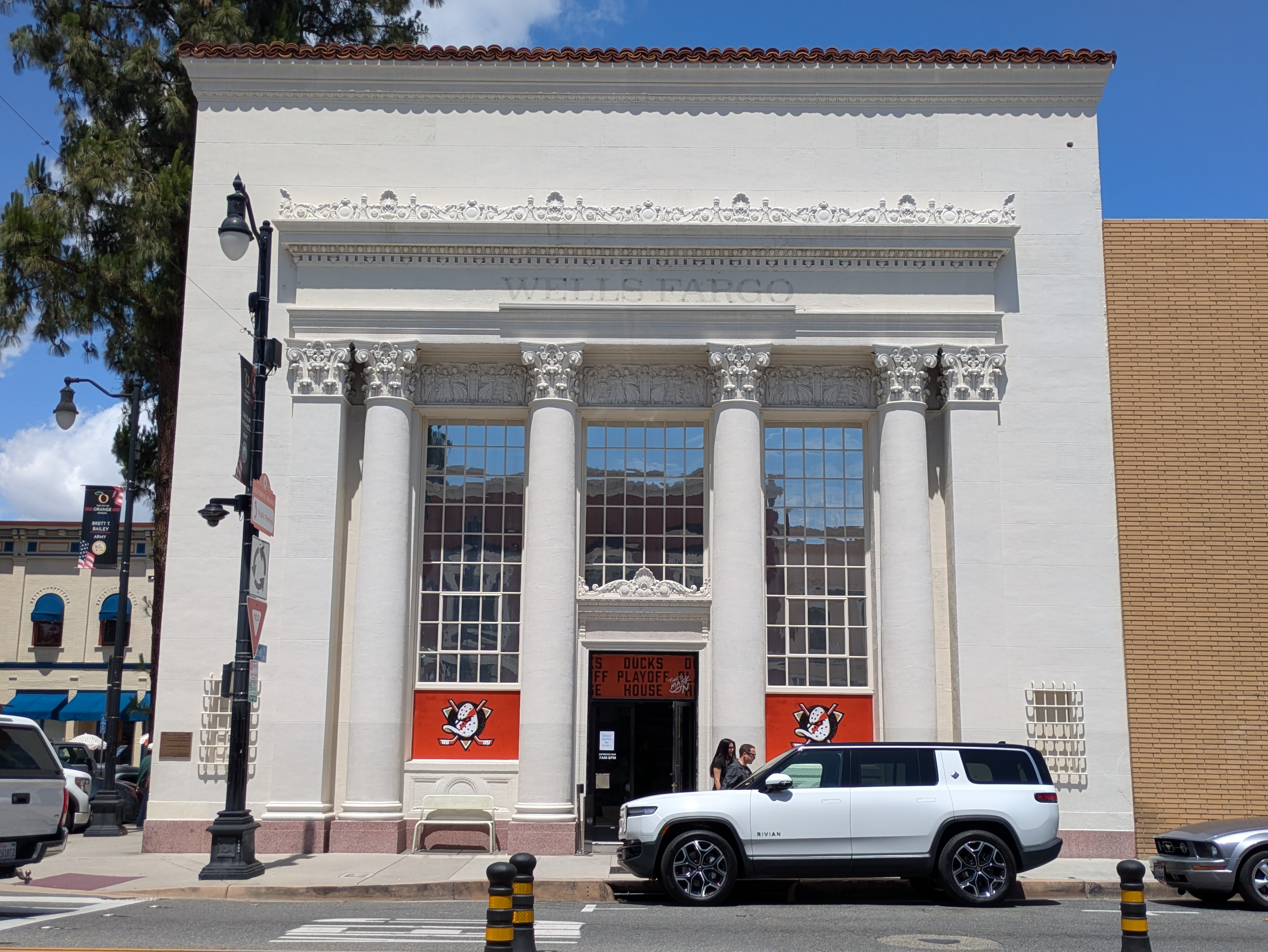
Ducks Playoff House, April 2026.

In 1978 and 1979, the California Sunshine was a professional soccer team that played regular season games in Orange.

The city roots for major league teams: the Los Angeles Angels of baseball and the Anaheim Ducks of ice hockey, right along the city borders across the Santa Ana River in Anaheim. This support for Anaheim sports teams was strengthened in 2026, when the Ducks hosted a pop-up store in the city of Orange during their playoff run in the 2026 Stanley Cup playoffs.

Within the city proper, the SoCal A's of the Southern California Collegiate Baseball Association played in Athletic (or Richland) Field.

Home to Saddleback Park motor playground 1967 – 1984. Saddleback hosted racing in the Trans-AMA motocross series from 1970 to 1976.

== Government ==
Orange city vote by party in presidential elections
Year	Democratic	Republican	Third Parties
2024	49.89% 30,384	46.9% 28,560	3.21% 1,953
2020	52.45% 34,851	45.19% 30,025	2.36% 1,567
2016	47.67% 25,982	44.98% 24,519	7.35% 4,006
2012	42.76% 22,065	54.49% 28,113	2.75% 1,418
2008	44.33% 23,317	53.24% 28,001	2.43% 1,278
2004	35.47% 17,549	63.39% 31,361	1.14% 566
2000	36.41% 16,615	59.54% 27,169	4.04% 1,844
1996	34.07% 14,032	55.23% 22,751	10.70% 4,408
1992	28.38% 13,232	47.37% 22,081	24.25% 11,305
1988	27.78% 11,716	71.02% 29,946	1.20% 506
1984	21.94% 8,529	77.05% 29,957	1.02% 395
1980	20.44% 7,341	71.04% 25,518	8.52% 3,062
1976	33.70% 10,384	64.16% 19,768	2.14% 659

In the California State Senate, Orange is split between the 34th senatorial district, represented by Democrat Tom Umberg, and the 37th senatorial district, represented by Republican Steven Choi. In the California State Assembly, it is split between the 59th Assembly district, represented by Republican Phillip Chen, and the 68th Assembly district, represented by Democrat Avelino Valencia.

In the United States House of Representatives, Orange is split between California's 40th congressional district, represented by Republican Young Kim, and California's 46th congressional district, represented by Democrat Lou Correa.

Orange, like much of Orange County, is known for its affluence and political conservatism – a 2005 academic study listed Orange among three Orange County cities as being among America's 25 "most conservative", making it one of two counties in the country containing more than one such city (Maricopa County, Arizona also has three cities on the list).

Orange remains a somewhat conservative city in recent years; however, in 2016, Hillary Clinton defeated Donald Trump by 1,463 votes (2.7%). Nevertheless, the city voted 3% more Republican than the average of Orange County, and nearly 14% more Republican than the state of California as a whole. In 2020, Joe Biden carried the city by a larger margin, winning 52.5% of the vote to Donald Trump's 45.2%, though this was still much narrower than his statewide margin.

According to the Orange County Registrar of Voters, as of May 15, 2025, Orange had 81,722 registered voters. Of those, 25,744 (36.87%) were registered Republicans, 22,162 (31.74%) are registered Democrats, and 18,759 (26.86%) were independents.

== Education ==
All public schools (excluding Santiago Canyon College) in the region are managed by the Orange Unified School District, which serves approximately 28,000 students across the cities of Orange, Anaheim, Garden Grove, Santa Ana, Villa Park, and some unincorporated parts of Orange County. High schools include Orange High School, Villa Park High School, El Modena High School, and Canyon High School.

=== Universities and colleges ===
- Chapman University
- Santiago Canyon College

=== Other schools ===
- International School of Los Angeles
- Eldorado Emerson Private School — preschool and K-12
- Lutheran High School of Orange County

== Infrastructure ==
=== Transportation ===
==== Automobile ====
Orange is situated near Interstate 5, also known as the Santa Ana Freeway. The junction of I-5 with two state highways (SR 57, the "Orange Freeway" and SR 22, the "Garden Grove Freeway"), commonly called the "Orange Crush", is one of the busiest interchanges in Orange County, and is located on the southwestern edge of the city. The Costa Mesa Freeway (SR 55) also passes through Orange, meeting the eastern terminus of SR 22 in the southern part of the city. The eastern areas of Orange are served by the Eastern and Foothill Toll Roads (SR 261 and SR 241) which connect the city with the cities of Irvine and Rancho Santa Margarita.

==== Rail ====
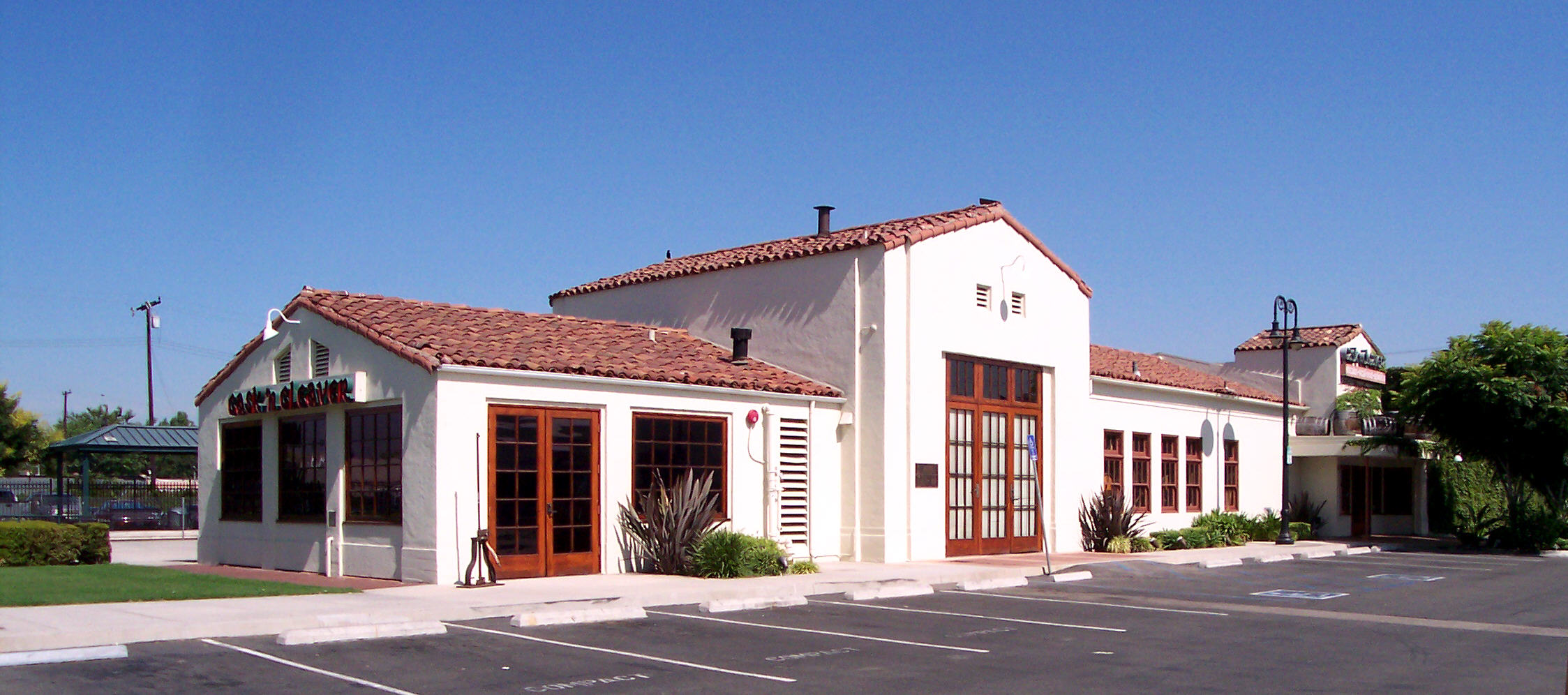
Former Santa Fe depot, now a restaurant. Metrolink service at Orange station uses the adjacent platforms.

The town's first rail service, the Santa Ana, Orange and Tustin Street Railway, was a 4.04 miles (6.50 km) long horsecar line that ran between Santa Ana and Orange, beginning in 1886. One year later, the Santa Ana and Orange Motor Road Company purchased the line, using a steam "dummy" car and a single gasoline motorcar as its means of conveyance. In 1906, Henry E. Huntington acquired the company under the auspices of the Los Angeles Inter-Urban Railway and electrified the line.

Passenger service over the new line operated by Huntington's Pacific Electric Railway began on June 8, 1914, originating at the PE's depot on Lemon Street. The route provided freight service to the local citrus growers, in direct competition with the Atchison, Topeka and Santa Fe Railway. Pacific Electric sold out in 1961 to the Southern Pacific Railroad, who ultimately abandoned the line in 1964.

The Santa Fe, under its affiliate the Southern California Railway, laid its first tracks through Orange in 1886, and established its first depot the following year. The route would become part of the railroad's famous "Surf Line", and by 1925, 16 daily passenger trains (the Santa Fe's San Diegan) made stops in Orange. During peak growing seasons, as many as 48 carloads of citrus fruits, olives, and walnuts were shipped daily from the Orange depot as well.

Orange's former Santa Fe depot, in Mediterranean Revival style, still stands adjacent to the current Orange station, which uses the platform area. It was dedicated on May 1, 1938, and was closed with the discontinuation of passenger service in 1971, though commuter service resumed at the adjacent platform in 1993. The building was granted historic landmark status by the city on November 15, 1990. In July 2004, the facility was home to a Cask 'n Cleaver restaurant and was remodeled and reopened in 2011 as a Ruby's Diner.

Rail connections to Los Angeles, the Inland Empire, and Northern San Diego County are provided by the Metrolink regional commuter rail network. The Orange station's platform is situated adjacent to the former Santa Fe depot in the downtown Historic District, which is also home to an Orange County Transportation Authority (OCTA) bus station, is the second busiest station of the entire Metrolink train system due to its position serving as a transfer station for the Orange County and the IEOC Metrolink lines. The former Santa Fe mainline links the cities of Los Angeles, Riverside, and San Diego via a junction north of the station.

==== Airports ====
John Wayne Airport (SNA), in nearby Santa Ana, provides daily scheduled airline service for the area.

=== Emergency services ===
Law enforcement is provided by the Orange Police Department (OPD), which covers a jurisdictional area of roughly 27 sq mi (70 km^{2}). OPD polices through three divisions; the Field Services Division, which consists of Patrol, Traffic Bureau, Communications Center, Crime Analysis, Bike Unit and H.E.A.R.T (Homeless Education and Resource Team); the Investigative Services Division, which consists of Crimes Against Person, Property and Economic Crimes, Gang Unit and the Special Investigations Unit; and finally the Support Services Division, which consists of Fiscal Affairs, Information Technology, Timekeeping, Personnel and Training, Crime Prevention/Analysis Unit, Volunteer Program, CERT, Facility and Fleet Services. The department also operates a SWAT team.

Fire protection is provided by the Orange City Fire Department which has eight stations across the city, which house seven fire engines, one fire truck, one quintuple combination pumper, and four rescue ambulances. The department is a member of the Metro Cities Fire Authority which provides emergency communications for multiple departments in and around Orange County. The department employs three battalion chiefs, which each manage a team of three shifts of 35 firefighters, each cross trained as an emergency medical technician.

=== Water Services ===
Water in Orange is supplied by the City of Orange Water Division, which sources its water from the Metropolitan Water District of Southern California, which imports water from the Colorado River and the San Francisco-San Joaquin Bay Delta. Groundwater is drawn by 11 municipal wells tapped into the Santa Ana River Aquifer. A small portion of water is purchased from the Serrano Water District.

== Notable people ==
- Don Aase, MLB pitcher for five teams
- Héctor Ambriz, MLB player for the Houston Astros and the Cleveland Indians
- Mike Ammann, soccer player
- Garrett Atkins, MLB player for the Baltimore Orioles and Colorado Rockies
- Shane Bieber, MLB pitcher and former Cy Young winner
- Erica Blasberg (1984–2010), LPGA golfer, born in Orange
- James Blaylock, fantasy author
- Bert Blyleven, MLB player who played in the California Angels and once owned a cafe in nearby Villa Park
- Carlos Borja, soccer player
- Jeff Buckley (1966–1997), singer-songwriter and guitarist
- Danny Califf, retired MLS soccer player.
- Lauren Chamberlain, softball infielder, born in Orange
- Bud Daley, MLB player for the Cleveland Indians, Kansas City Athletics, and New York Yankees
- Mikey Day, comedian, writer and cast member on Saturday Night Live, born in Orange
- Deakin, member of Animal Collective, born in Orange.
- Rob Deer, MLB outfielder for the San Francisco Giants, Milwaukee Brewers, Detroit Tigers, Boston Red Sox, and San Diego Padres.
- Zach Ertz, tight end for the Philadelphia Eagles, born in Orange
- Placida Gardner Chesley, WWI worker, bacteriologist
- David Fletcher, MLB player for the Los Angeles Angels
- Dominic Fletcher, MLB player for the Arizona Diamondbacks
- Charles Gipson, former MLB player for the Baltimore Orioles, New York Yankees, Tampa Bay Devil Rays and Houston Astros
- Ciara Hanna, born in Orange, martial art actress and Model Power Rangers Megaforce
- Casey Janssen, MLB player, born in Orange.
- Chris Jent, NBA assistant coach for the Los Angeles Lakers
- Steve Johnson, professional tennis player, two-time NCAA champion
- Dean Koontz, novelist, once resided in Orange Hills and set many of his novels, such as The Bad Place, in the area.
- Rusty Kuntz, baseball World Series champion player (1984) and coach (2015).
- Justin Lehr, MLB player for the Cincinnati Reds, Oakland Athletics, and Milwaukee Brewers, born in Orange.
- Alexander Lévy (born 1990), professional golfer
- Hunter Mahan, PGA Tour golfer, born in Orange.
- Scott McAdams, former mayor of Sitka, Alaska and Democratic nominee for U.S. Senate in Alaska in 2010, born in Orange
- Mike Pompeo (born 1963), US Secretary of State and past CIA Director
- Linda Sánchez (born 1969), U.S. representative for California
- Sunny (birth name: Susan Soonkyu Lee), a Korean-American singer and entertainer, based in South Korea, who is a member of K-pop girl group Girls' Generation.
- Derek Tran, U.S. representative
- Gaddi Vasquez, Orange County supervisor, Director of the Peace Corps, U S Ambassador
- Adam the Woo, YouTuber
- Ginger Zee, meteorologist, ABC News and Good Morning America, born in Orange.

== Sister cities ==
Orange has five sister cities, as designated by Sister Cities International:

- Novo Kosino, Moscow, Russia
- Orange, New South Wales, Australia
- Orange, Vaucluse, France
- Santiago de Querétaro, Mexico
- Timaru, New Zealand

Orange used to have two community partnerships with Utrecht, the Netherlands; and Santiago, Chile.

== See also ==
- List of museums in Orange County, California
- List of Tree Cities USA
- Theo Lacy Facility
