= Lewis Ainsworth House =

Historic house in California, United States

- U.S. National Register of Historic Places
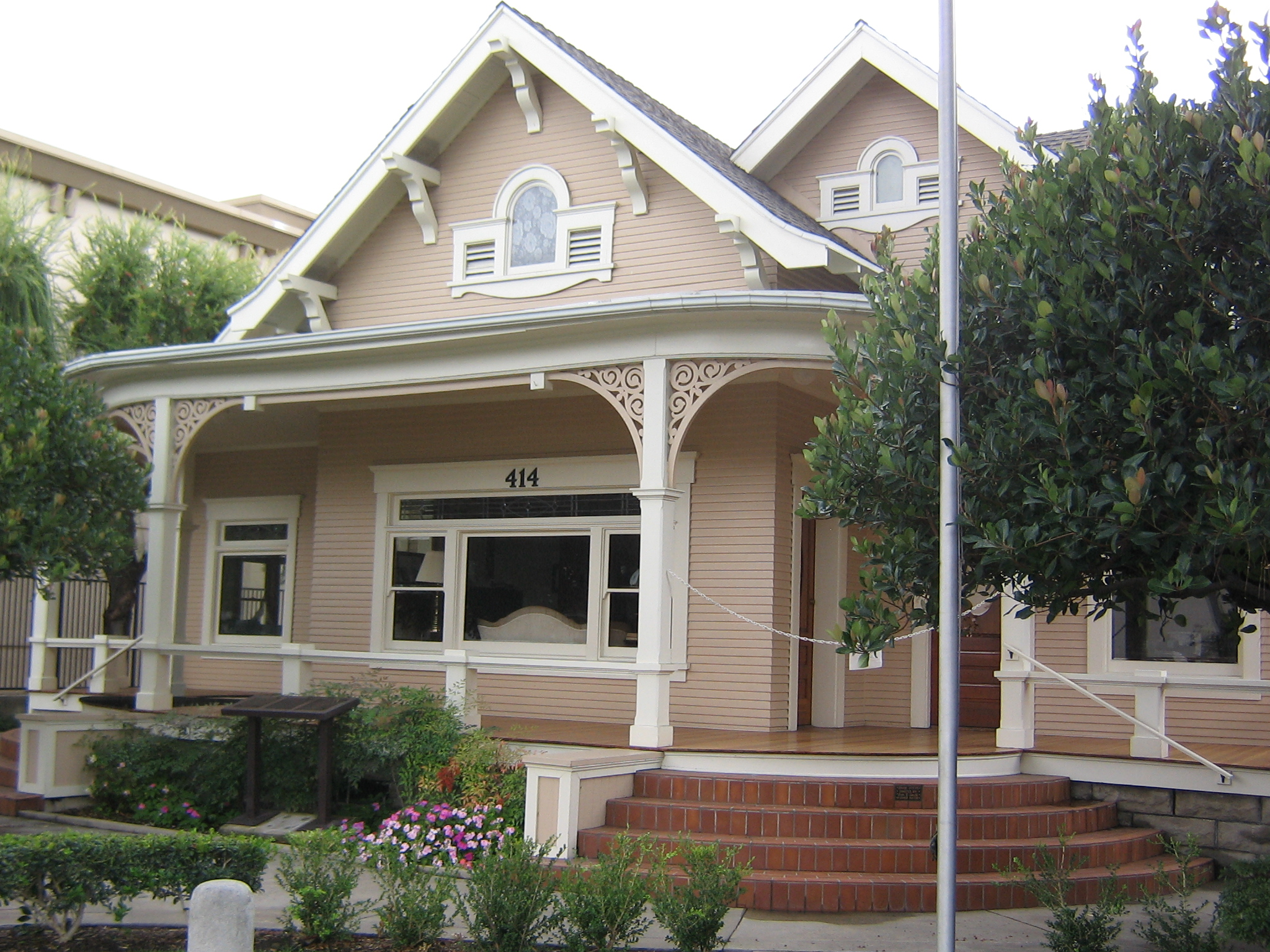
- The Ainsworth House in 2007
- Location: 414 E. Chapman Ave; Orange, California
- Coordinates: 33°47′16″N 117°50′58″W
- Architect: Ina Ainsworth Butler
- Architectural style: American Craftsman
- NRHP reference No.: 81000163
- Added to NRHP: March 13, 1981

The Lewis Ainsworth House is a restored American Craftsman style home in the city of Orange, in Orange County, California, United States. The house is one of many preserved historic homes in and around Old Towne Orange. The home currently stands next to St. John's Lutheran Church, across the street from the city's public library, and nearby the Orange City Hall. It is currently owned by the City of Orange.

== History ==
Lewis Ainsworth originally came to California in search of gold during the California Gold Rush in 1849. He moved around the country for most of his life, but settled in Orange in 1900. Ainsworth was the owner of Ainsworth Lumber & Milling Company. Ainsworth had the home built in 1910 as a retirement home, and he lived there with his wife Persis and several children. It was designed by Ina Ainsworth Butler, daughter of Lewis and Persis. Lewis Ainsworth lived at the home for only four years until his death in 1914, and was sick for most of the time. The house remained in the family until 1975. It was purchased by the city in 1976 and later restored.

The home was added to the National Register of Historic Places on March 13, 1981. In 1997, Old Town Orange, the district in which the house lies, was also added to the database.

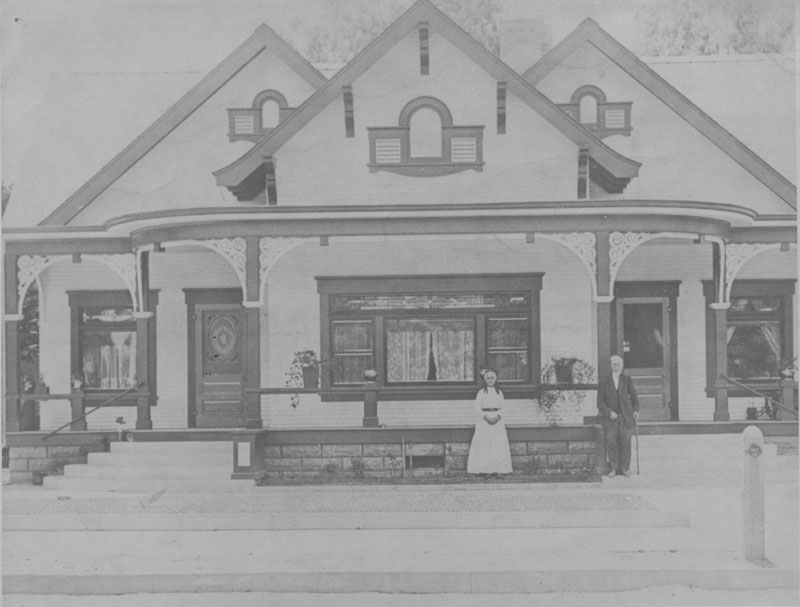
Lewis and Persis in front of the Ainsworth House in 1911
