= Capt. John C. Ainsworth House =

Historic house in Oregon, United States

- U.S. National Register of Historic Places
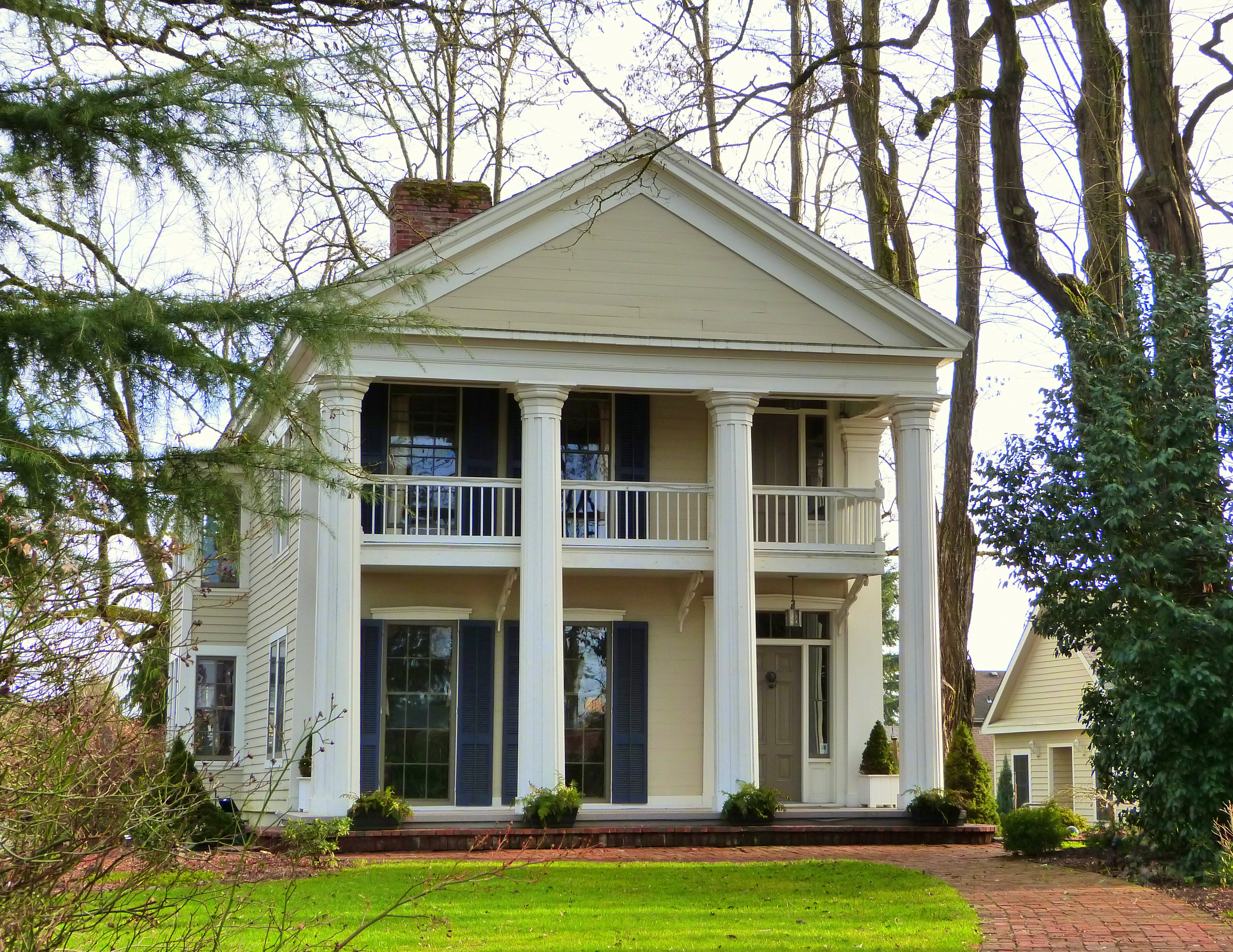
- The Ainsworth House in 2017

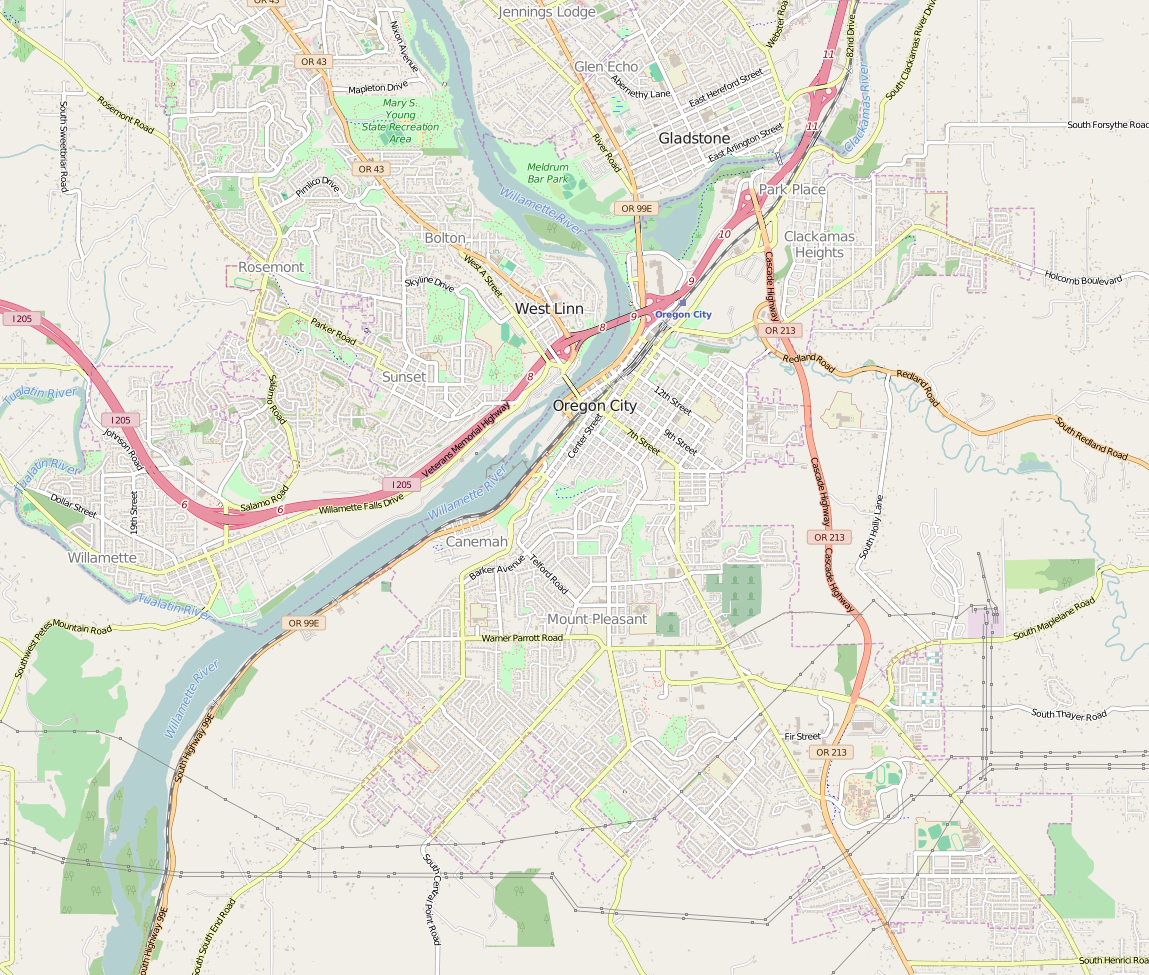
- Location within Oregon City OR Location within Oregon Location within the United States
- Location: 19130 Lot Whitcomb Drive; Oregon City, Oregon
- Coordinates: 45°19′43″N 122°36′17″W
- Built: 1851
- Architectural style: Classical Revival
- NRHP reference No.: 73001573
- Added to NRHP: March 26, 1973

The John C. Ainsworth House is a historic building in Oregon City, Oregon, United States. It was built in 1851 for John C. Ainsworth, the main founder of the Oregon Steam Navigation Company. It is one of the oldest structures in the Portland area and remains in good condition. It is also the only two-story portico in Oregon. The house was added to the National Register of Historic Places in 1973.

== See also ==
- National Register of Historic Places listings in Clackamas County, Oregon
- Maud and Belle Ainsworth House
- Belle Ainsworth Jenkins Estate
