= Plaza Park (Orange, California) =

Park and historic place in Orange, California

- U.S. National Register of Historic Places
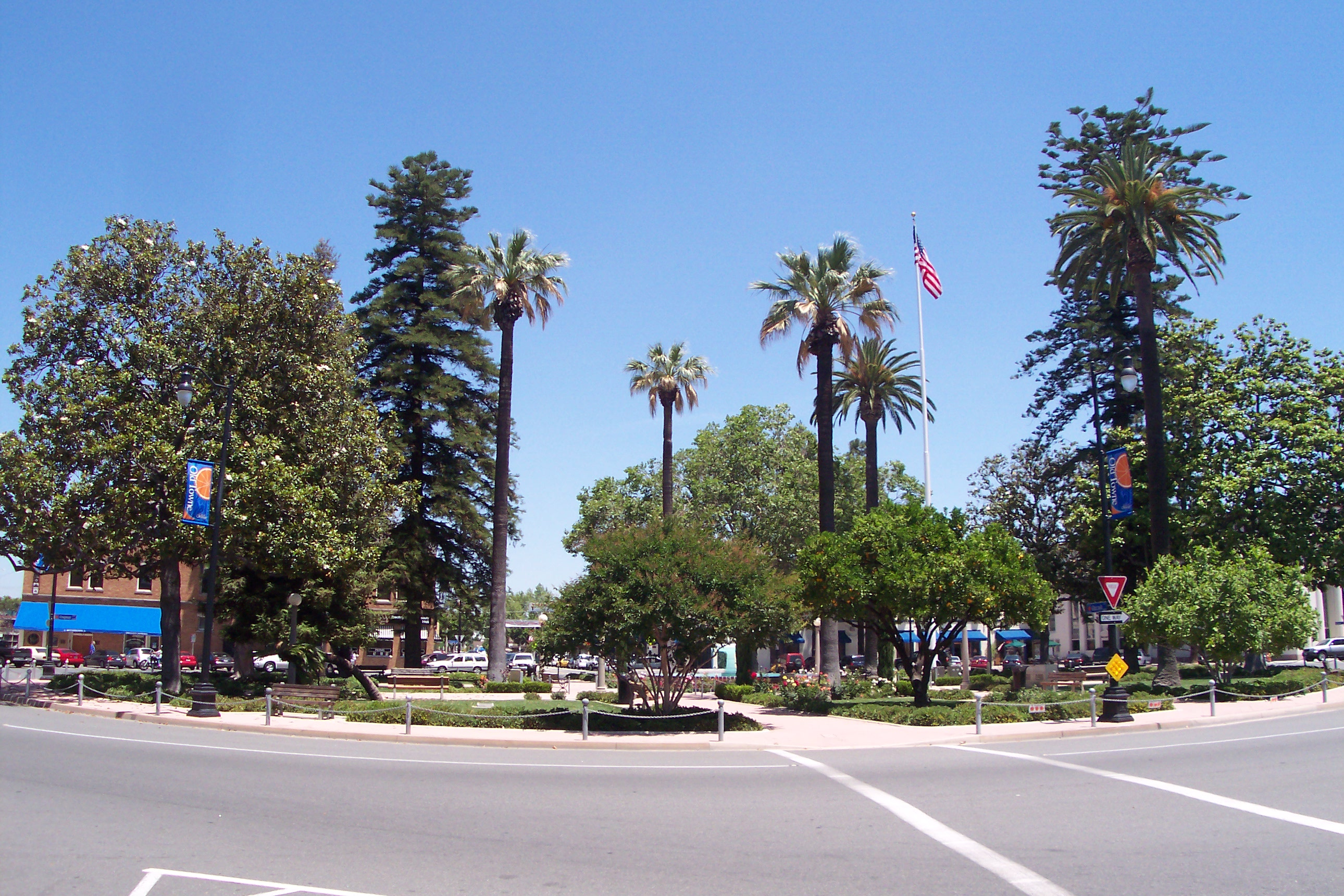
- Plaza Park, the centerpiece of the Old Towne, Orange Historic District.
- Location: 1 Plaza Square, Orange, California
- Coordinates: 33°47′16.00″N 117°51′08.00″W
- Area: 0.1 acres (0.040 ha)
- Built: 1886
- Architectural style: Spanish Architecture Art Deco
- NRHP reference No.: 78000729
- Added to NRHP: March 19, 1982

Plaza Park, also known as the Orange Plaza, is a public park in Orange, California. It is the centerpiece of Downtown Orange, as Orange, unlike most other cities in the area, was built around the roundabout the park creates. The park is most commonly recognized by the fountain in the center.

In 2018, it was designated as a "Great Place in America" by the American Planning Association.

== History ==
By the 1870s, the intersection of Chapman Avenue and Glassell Street within the settlement that would soon become Orange was a trash-filled vacant lot. Robert L. Crowder, a local merchant, planted trees in the square and the lot became a hitching post adorned with water troughs where farmers and ranchers could leave their sheep and horses while they shopped in the stores in the settlement's central business district.

An early problem with the square was that roaming flocks of chickens created a hazard to the horse and buggy traffic in the area. The women of the town wanted to beautify the square and create a more attractive center of town, and other citizens additionally supported the campaign. On May 15, 1887, the Los Angeles Board of Supervisors approved the plans for the Plaza (Orange County was not yet incorporated, and was previously considered part of Los Angeles County). The community then laid out its first park, surrounding it with barbed wire. It was decided that a fountain would beautify it, and citizens raised the necessary $535 through various fundraisers, including bake sales and a play.

In February 1887, the new fountain arrived. The design incorporated birds with beaks spouting water, and in the years following, other features including, trees, shrubs, flowers, and concrete cubing were added. Later on, gravel pathways were added, and plants, the flagpole, and the outer perimeter chain railing as well as the benches were replaced.

In 1937, a new electric tile fountain was installed.

The Plaza Historic District was placed in the National Register of Historic Places on March 19, 1982.

The Plaza remains the center of the city's downtown area, with an assortment of business, residential, and retail establishments surrounding it.
