= Maud and Belle Ainsworth House =

Historic building in Portland, Oregon, U.S.

- U.S. National Register of Historic Places
- Portland Historic Landmark
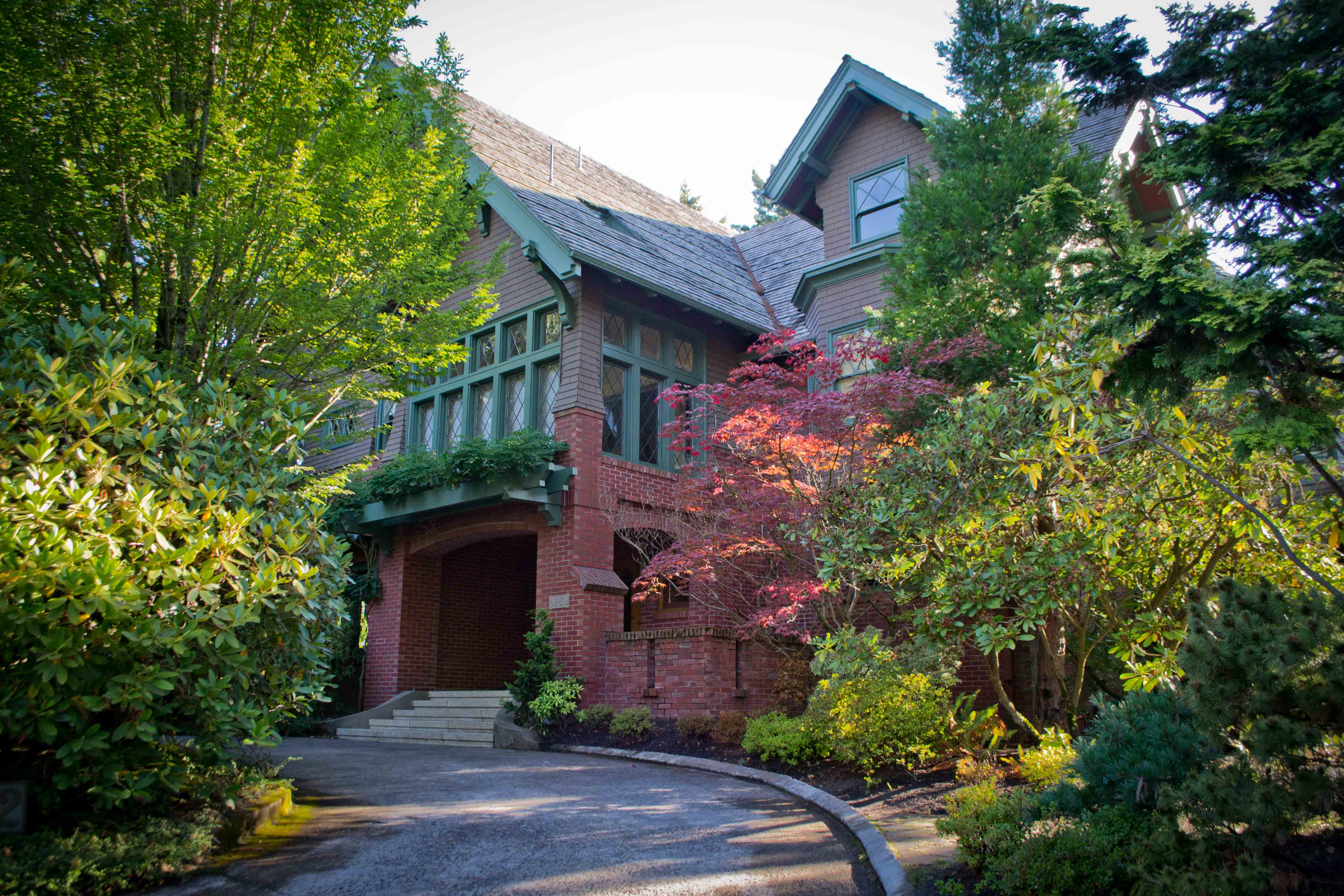

- Location within Oregon Location within the United States
- Interactive map showing the location of Maud and Belle Ainsworth House
- Location: 2542 SW Hillcrest Drive; Portland, Oregon
- Coordinates: 45°30′27″N 122°42′06″W
- Area: 0.66 acres (0.27 ha)
- Built: 1907
- Architect: William C. Knighton; modifications by Root & Kerr
- Architectural style: Arts and Crafts
- NRHP reference No.: 86000288
- Added to NRHP: February 27, 1986

The Maud and Belle Ainsworth House is a historic house located in the Southwest Hills neighborhood of Portland, Oregon. It is listed on the National Register of Historic Places.

Maud Ainsworth was a prominent Northwest photographer in a cutting-edge, modernist style. The 1907 Arts and Crafts house she shared with her sister Belle included her studio and darkroom. The sisters were the two youngest daughters of pioneer businessman and steamboat owner John C. Ainsworth. Belle Ainsworth, under her married name of Jenkins, is also associated with the National Register listed Jenkins Estate in nearby Washington County.

The house is a defining work of architect William C. Knighton, a designer of importance throughout Oregon.

== See also ==
- National Register of Historic Places listings in Southwest Portland, Oregon
- Capt. John C. Ainsworth House
