= Belle Ainsworth Jenkins Estate =

- U.S. National Register of Historic Places
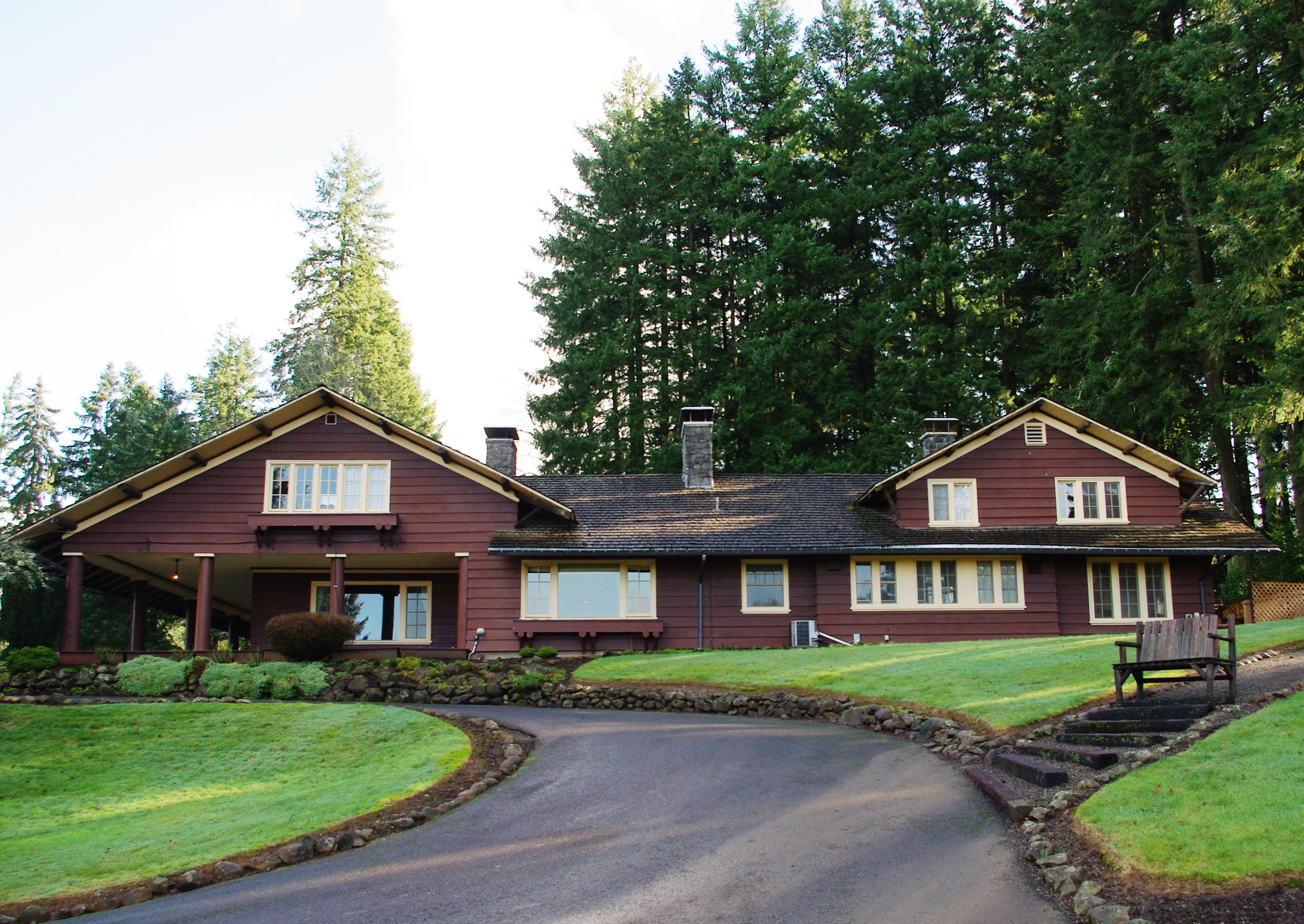
- The main house of the estate in 2011.

- Location within Oregon Location within the United States
- Interactive map showing Belle Ainsworth Jenkins Estate
- Location: 8005 SW Grabhorn Road, Beaverton, Oregon
- Coordinates: 45°27′37″N 122°53′29″W
- Area: 14.197 acres (5.745 ha)
- Built: 1880
- Architect: Root & Hoose
- NRHP reference No.: 78002327
- Added to NRHP: November 28, 1978

The Belle Ainsworth Jenkins Estate, located near Beaverton, Oregon, United States, is listed on the National Register of Historic Places. Built starting in 1912, the main house on the property was intended as a summer home. The entire 68-acre (28 ha) estate is owned by the Tualatin Hills Park & Recreation District (THPRD). The estate has eight buildings, including the main home and a farmhouse built in 1880.

== History ==
Ralph and Belle Jenkins purchased the property for $7,000 in 1912 for what was intended to be their summer home. Belle was the daughter of John C. Ainsworth, a founder of the Oregon Steam Navigation Company, while Ralph had been a teacher. The Jenkins began construction on a large estate that year as an escape from the city. The English hunting lodge-style main home took three years to complete, and was in addition to the original farmhouse on the property. Other facilities on the estate included fine equestrian facilities, as well as gardens, a greenhouse, an ornamental pool, a tea house, a carriage house, and a water tower.

Ralph Jenkins died in the 1950s; Belle died in 1963. Burt Muir inherited the property, but sold it to developers for what was planned to be a retirement community. Once the project failed due to a lack of water and sewer access, the developers put the estate up for sale. The Tualatin Hills Park & Recreation District purchased the Jenkins estate in 1976 for $525,000. In 1978, the estate was added to the National Register of Historic Places as the Belle Ainsworth Jenkins Estate.

The Tualatin Valley Chapter of the American Rhododendron Society started working with THPRD in 1982 to restore the rhododendron garden on the property. The park district restored the property in 1989 at a cost of $178,000. Camp Rivendale, a camp for adults and children with disabilities, was created in the 1980s. Due to operating losses at the property, THPRD decided to outsource management of the events at the estate in 2013;

== Details ==
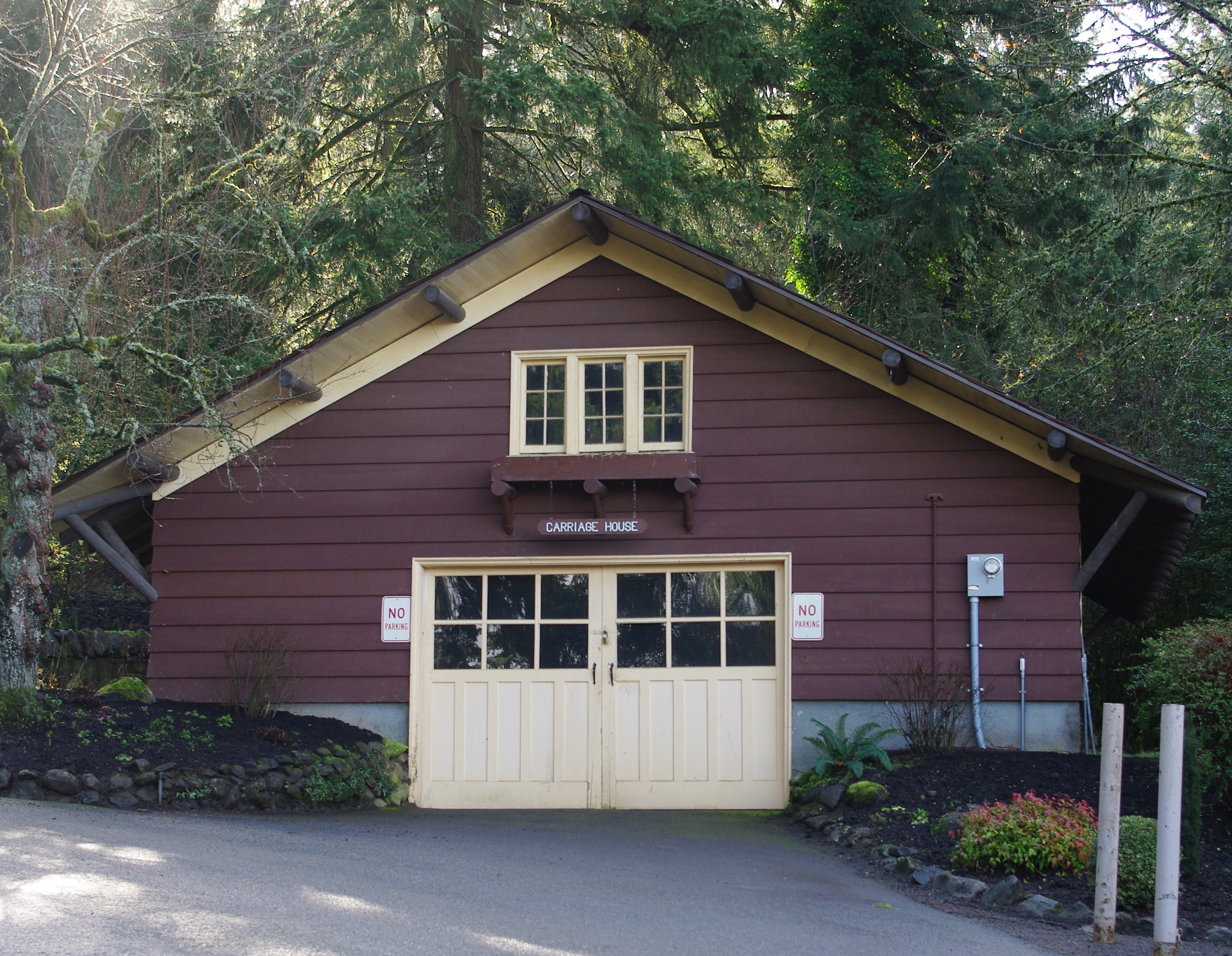
The carriage house

Jenkins Estate covers 68 acres (28 ha) and contains 28 acres (11 ha) of gardens. The structures on the property are the main house, stable, carriage house, greenhouse, tea house, water tower, pump house, and the farmhouse. The 14,550-square-foot (1,352 m^{2}) main house is L-shaped with a full basement. THPRD rents out the buildings for business meetings, weddings, and other events. The Herb Garden was created in 1985 with help from the Oregon School of the Blind and contains a Braille Garden planted with fragrant herbs.

== See also ==
- Maud and Belle Ainsworth House
- National Register of Historic Places listings in Washington County, Oregon
