= William W. and Elizabeth J. Ainsworth House =

Historic house in Iowa, United States

- U.S. National Register of Historic Places
- The Ainsworth House viewed from the southeast

- Location within Iowa Location within the United States
- Location: 1310 7th St. Des Moines, Iowa
- Coordinates: 41°36′08.2″N 93°37′37.9″W
- Area: less than one acre
- Built: 1886
- Architectural style: Queen Anne
- MPS: Towards a Greater Des Moines MPS
- NRHP reference No.: 98001275
- Added to NRHP: October 22, 1998

The William W. and Elizabeth J. Ainsworth House, also known as the Catholic Worker House and the Dingman House, is an historic building located in Des Moines, Iowa, United States. Ainsworth was a Des Moines businessman who was engaged in various professional occupations. His wife Elizabeth took title to this property in 1886, and they built this 2 1/2-story, frame, Queen Anne house in what was then the suburban community of North Des Moines. It features a hip roof, intersecting gables, a front porch, an enclosed porch in the back, and 2-story bay windows on the south and east elevations. Built as a single-family dwelling, it is now a half-way house for social services operated by the Catholic Worker Movement. The house calls attention to the increased importance of North Des Moines as a residential neighborhood for business and professional people in the late 19th-century Des Moines area. It was listed on the National Register of Historic Places in 1998.
