= Old Towne, Orange Historic District =

Historic district in California, United States

- Old Towne Orange Historic District
- U.S. National Register of Historic Places
- U.S. Historic district
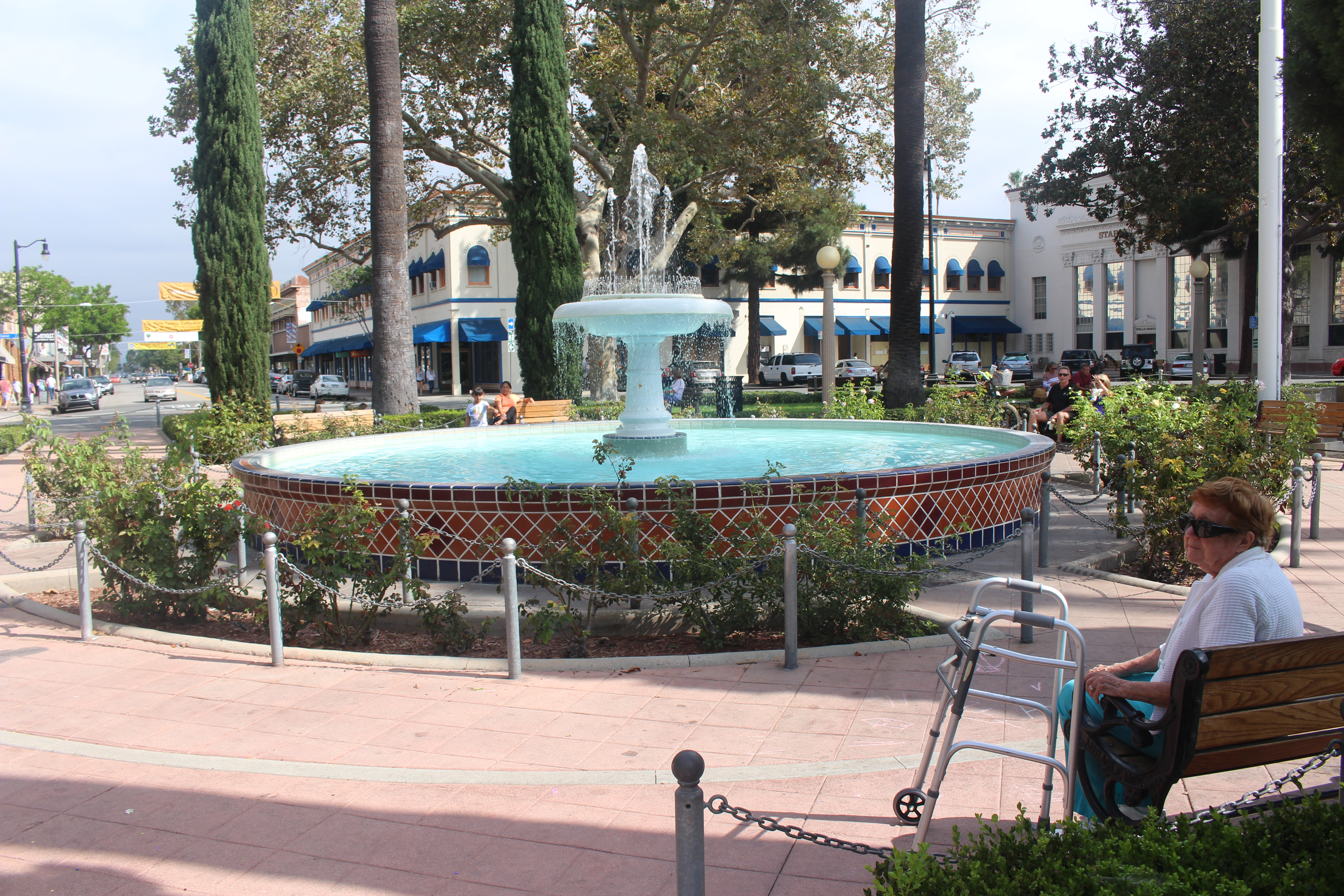
- Location: Roughly bounded by Walnut Ave., Waverly St., W.O. Hart Park, La Veta Ave., Clark St., and Atchison Topeka Railroad Track, Orange, California
- Coordinates: 33°47′16″N 117°51′10″W
- Architect: multiple
- Architectural style: Bungalow/Craftsman, Mission/Spanish Revival, Classical Revival
- NRHP reference No.: 97000617
- Added to NRHP: July 11, 1997

The Old Towne, Orange Historic District, also known as Downtown Orange and colloquially as The Circle, is a one-square-mile district centered around Plaza Park in Orange, California. The district contains many of the original structures built following the city's incorporation and includes Orange County's oldest operating bank. Listed on the National Register of Historic Places in 1997, it is the largest National Register District in California. The Old Towne Preservation Association is a non-profit organization dedicated to maintaining the district.

According to State Historic Resource Surveys, Orange has the second-largest concentration of historic buildings in the state. A list of all buildings and sites in Orange that appear in the National Register of Historic Places can be found at National Register of Historic Places listings in Orange County, California.

== Orange International Street Fair ==
The district hosts the Orange International Street Fair, held annually every Labor Day weekend since 1973. The inaugural event was held to celebrate the city's centennial and pay homage to the original 1910 Orange Street Fair. The fair's success led the city to hold the event annually ever since. The event covers the Plaza, West and East Chapman Avenue, and North and South Glassell Street, and features international food and drink, live music and entertainment, and showcases for local businesses and non-profit organizations. The event typically draws several hundred thousand attendees over the course of the weekend.

== Use as a Filming Location ==
Due to its classic, turn-of-the-century style and proximity to Hollywood, the area and many of its businesses has served as the backdrop for at least 20 feature films in addition to several TV show episodes and commercials. Some notable examples include the 1996 Tom Hanks film, That Thing You Do!, a scene in an episode of 2017's American Horror Story: Cult, and 2006 comedy film The Benchwarmers. In addition, being located only a few blocks away from Chapman University's top-ranked Dodge College of Film and Media Arts, it has also been used in countless student projects.

== Architectural styles ==
- Bungalow/California Bungalow
- Craftsman Bungalow/Craftsman
- Hip Roof Cottage
- Mediterranean
- Prairie
- Spanish Colonial
- Victorian
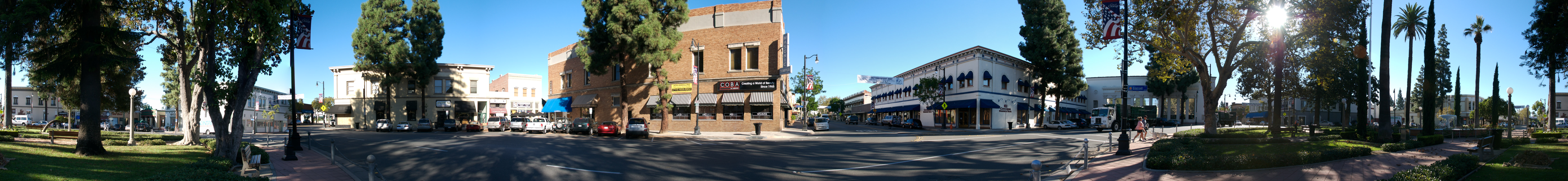
Panorama from the center of the Plaza
