= La Vida Mineral Springs =

Geothermal site in California

- La Vida (or LaVida) Hot Springs; La Vida Mineral Springs Well; La Vida Hot Soda Springs
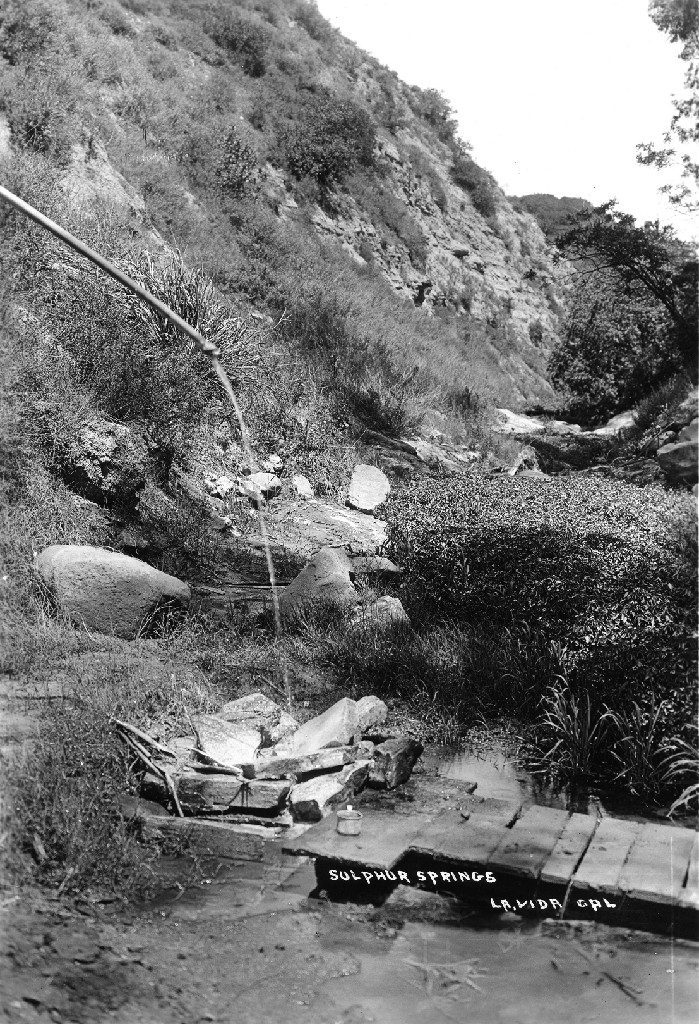
- La Vida c. 1920 (Edward W. Cochems, UC Irvine Libraries)
- Interactive map of La Vida Mineral Springs
- Coordinates: 33.935°N 117.7926°W
- Elevation: 790 ft (240 m)
- Type: Thermal
- Discharge: 76 L/min (20 US gal/min)
- Temperature: 43 °C (109 °F)
- Depth: 2,035 ft (620 m)

La Vida Hot Springs were a historically significant natural spring and nearby hot-water well in Carbon Canyon, Chino Hills, Orange County, California, United States.

== Geography ==
The La Vida springs were located about halfway between Pomona and Anaheim. They are very close to the point where the borders of Los Angeles, Orange, and San Bernardino counties meet, specifically about 1.35 mi (2.17 km) southwest of the Orange County line. The water well was about 150 ft (46 m) north of Carbon Canyon Road, and the bottling plant that existed for a time was adjacent to the well. The closest human settlement is historic Olinda. The La Vida subdivision of the geologic Puente Formation is named for rock layers found in the vicinity of La Vida Mineral Springs.

== History ==
La Vida is the site of two separate water sources, a natural spring or seep known to indigenous people, and a water well drilled in 1893 as part of the exploration of the Brea-Olinda Oil Field.

La Vida Mineral Springs, sometimes called LaVida Hot Springs, was operated as a resort and spa from the 1910s to the 1980s. The resort had swimming pools, a café, and cabins and a motel for visitors. The springs were also the site of LaVida Beverage bottling plant. (La Vida Beverage later moved many operations to Fullerton.)

Major development of the site began with a $150,000 investment in 1924, and with the paving of the Carbon Canyon Road in 1925, which was touted as a "benefit to ranchers". This development might have also been beneficial to bootleggers that were based at La Vida during the Prohibition era. At least one of the buildings on the site had a "Thirties Deco look," and the owners of the beverage company were based in downtown Los Angeles in the early 1930s. Former boxer Archie Rosenbaum had a stake in the place at one time, and La Vida eventually became a popular resort for Southern California's Jewish community in the mid-20th century.

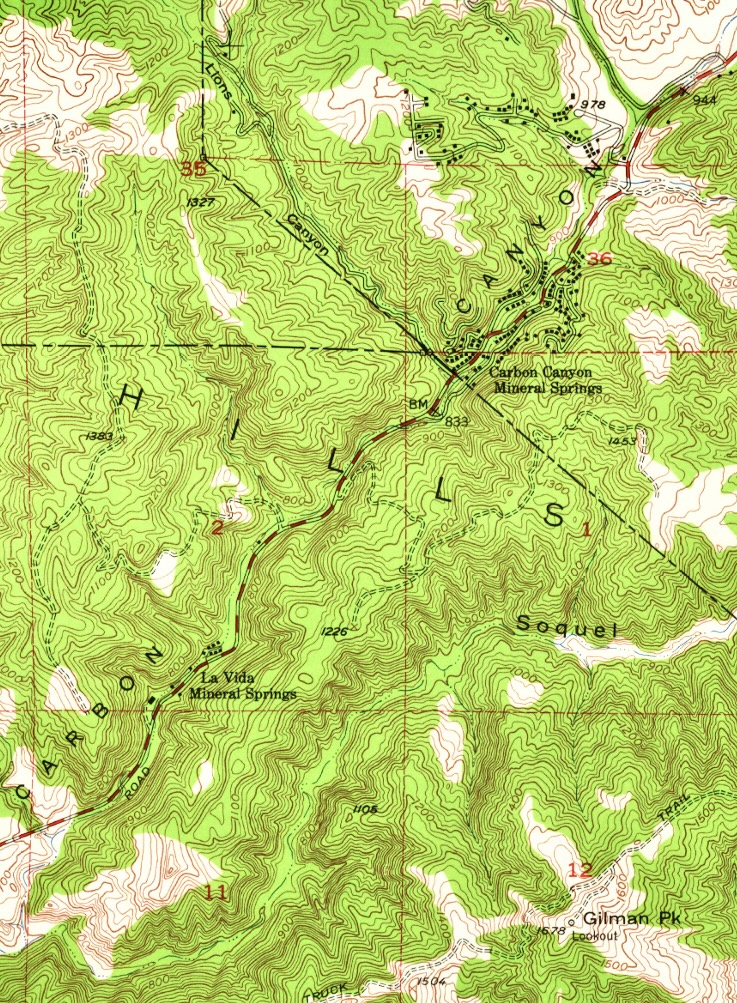
La Vida Mineral Springs and Carbon Canyon Mineral Springs c. 1949 (USGS Yorba Linda quandrangle map)

The site was bought and operated by a Japanese-American family in the 1970s and 1980s but was closed following a 1988 fire. Only a restaurant survived, which became a popular biker bar. The 2008 Freeway Complex Fire destroyed most of the remaining infrastructure on the site except the concrete water tank.

== Water profile ==
The well produced 25,000 to 30,000 gallons a day. Despite the common name "hot springs," La Vida is classified by geothermal energy researchers as a warm spring; the water temperature was 43 °C (109 °F).

== See also ==
- List of hot springs in the United States § California
- Alvarado Hot Springs
- Carbon Canyon Regional Park
- Chino Hills State Park
- Santa Ana River Trail
- Puente Hills
- Whittier Fault
