= Sleepy Hollow, Chino Hills, California =

Sleepy Hollow
- Neighborhood of Chino Hills
- Location within the state of California
- Coordinates: 33°56′52″N 117°46′43″W
- Country: United States
- State: California
- County: San Bernardino
- City: Chino Hills
- Elevation: 856 ft (261 m)
- Time zone: UTC-8 (Pacific (PST))
  - Summer (DST): UTC-7 (PDT)
- ZIP codes: 91709
- Area code: 714
- GNIS feature ID: 1661454

Sleepy Hollow is a neighborhood situated in Carbon Canyon among the Chino Hills within the city of Chino Hills in the Inland Empire region of San Bernardino County. The western boundary of the neighborhood adjoins the city of Brea in Orange County.

== History ==
Prior to European colonization, Sleepy Hollow was exclusively inhabited by the Tongva people.

The modern neighborhood was founded by Cleve and Elizabeth (Heald) Purington on about eighty acres in the 1920s, the community was subdivided into small cabin lots geared towards non-permanent residents. Purington, in 1925, created the Sleepy Hollow Water and Improvement Company, which had capital of $14,000 issued in 280 certificates of $50 each, to develop the neighborhood. Many of these cabins, some greatly altered, are still found in the neighborhood, which likely benefitted from the paving of Carbon Canyon Road (also State Route 142) in 1925. After World War II, Sleepy Hollow began to be inhabited more by full-time residents.

Sleepy Hollow had a cafe and tavern called Ichabod's that later became a store and gas station (now known as Canyon Market) and there was another grocery store at the far eastern end of the community later. Other interesting historical features included the volunteer fire house and community center, now replaced by a modern community center built in the early 2000s, and the community church, which is now a private residence.

A natural stream, known as Carbon Creek or Carbon Canyon Creek also winds through Sleepy Hollow and a hot springs existed at the bank of the creek just along the north edge of the state highway.

As a canyon community, Sleepy Hollow has been threatened several times by major fires, including in 1929, 1958, and 1990, all of which brought the loss of homes in the neighborhood. In November 2008, the massive Freeway Complex Fire burned to the very edges of the community and forced the evacuation of nearly all of its residents for three days, but, incredibly, no homes were lost. The City of Chino Hills has developed an evacuation and emergency access system for Sleepy Hollow and other neighborhoods within the Canyon.

Sleepy Hollow now has about 130 houses and about 300 to 400 residents. While development to the east since the late 1980s has greatly increased commuter traffic on Carbon Canyon Road, the neighborhood still retains a country feel that belies the suburbanization that goes on around it.
