= Freeway Complex Fire =

2008 wildfire in Southern California

- Part of the 2008 California wildfires
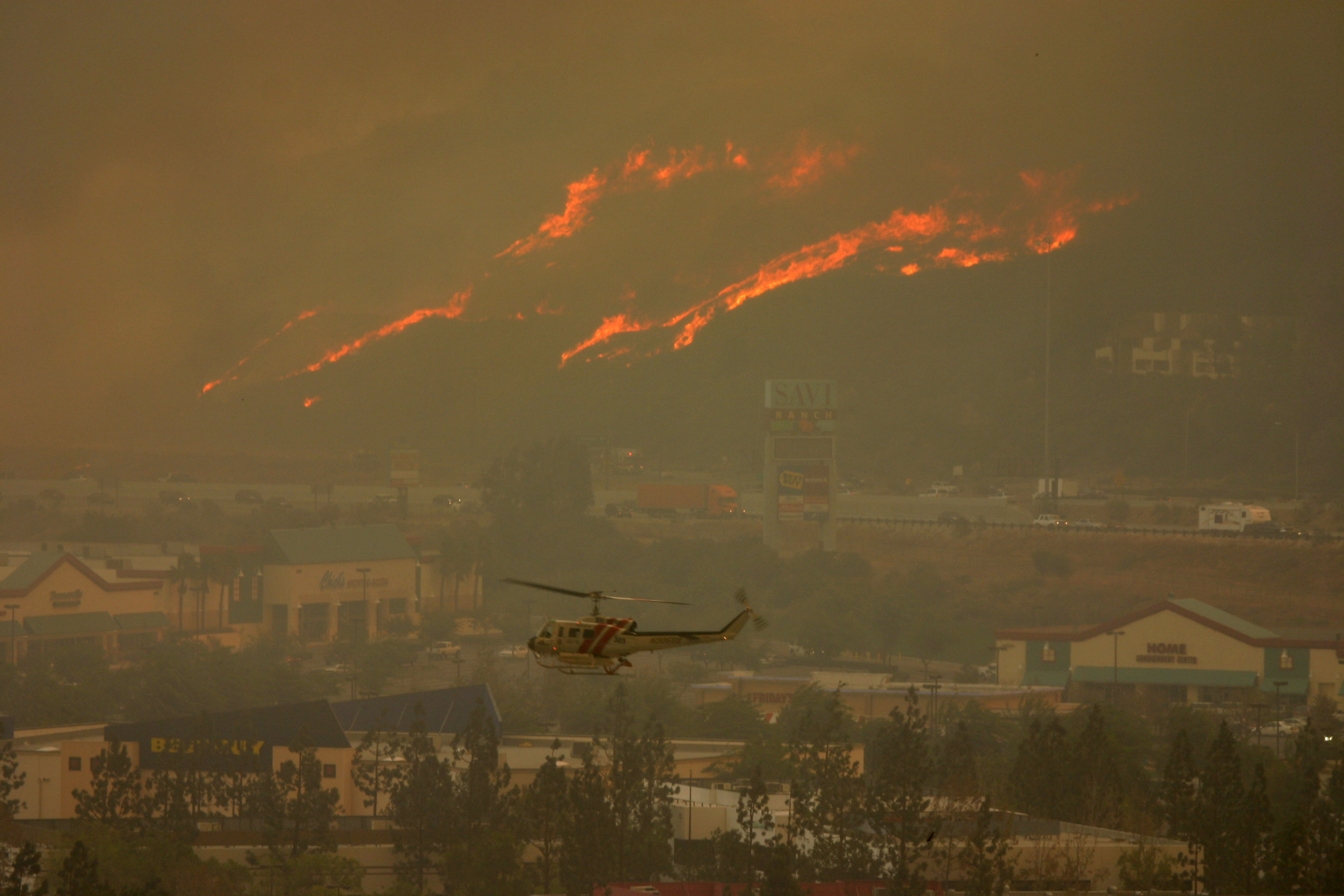
- Fire along the SR 91 freeway near Yorba Linda
- Date: November 15, 2008 –; November 25, 2008
- Location: Chino Hills State Park, Corona, California
- Coordinates: 33°52.9′N 117°39′W

Statistics
- Burned area: 30,305 acres (123 km^{2})

Impacts
- Injuries: 14 firefighters
- Structures lost: 314 homes; 43 outbuildings; 4 commercial properties
- Cost: $16.1 million (2008 USD)

Ignition
- Cause: Freeway Fire source: Faulty catalytic converter; Landfill Fire source: Faulty power lines

Map
- Location of fire in Greater Los Angeles Location of fire in Southern California

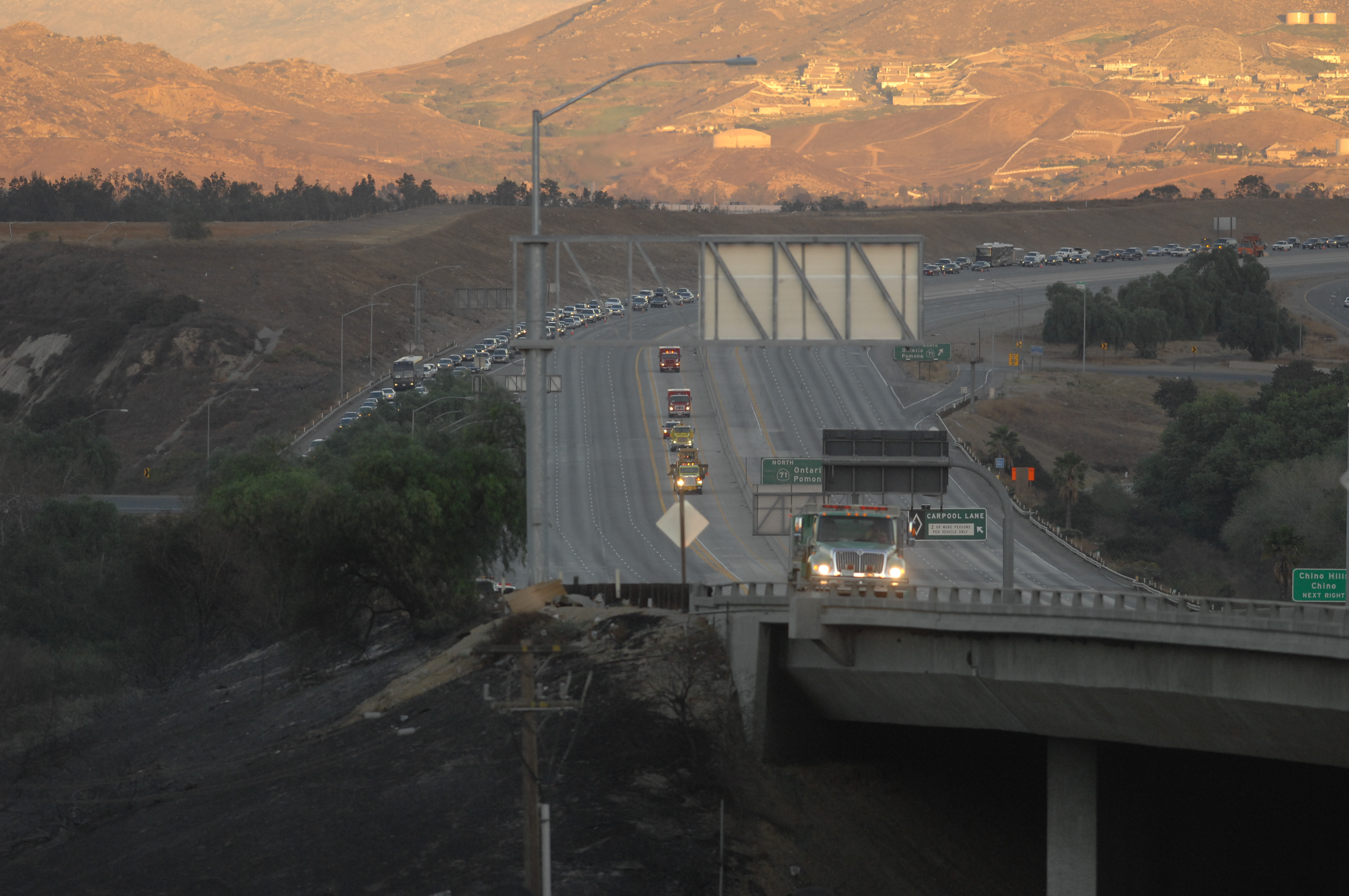
Closure of SR 91 on November 15, 2008

The Freeway Complex Fire was a 2008 wildfire in the Santa Ana Canyon area of Orange County, California. The fire started as two separate fires on November 15, 2008. The Freeway Fire started first shortly after 9 am with the Landfill Fire igniting approximately 2 hours later. These two separate fires merged a day later and ultimately destroyed 314 residences in Anaheim Hills and Yorba Linda.

== Events ==
The Freeway Fire ignited at 9:01 a.m. PDT on November 15, 2008, along the Riverside Freeway (State Route 91, SR 91) in the riverbed of the Santa Ana River, located in Corona. The fire spread west and north into the hillsides of Yorba Linda and south into Anaheim Hills, where multiple businesses and residences were destroyed. It also burned homes in Olinda Ranch and the remnants of the La Vida Mineral Springs resort along Carbon Canyon Road in Brea, burned through much of Chino Hills, then spread north into Diamond Bar.

The Landfill Fire, also known as the "Brea Fire," was reported at 10:43 a.m. PDT on November 15, 2008, and started near the 1900 block of Valencia Avenue in Brea, just south of the Olinda Landfill. It quickly spread west and eventually jumped the Orange Freeway (SR 57).

The Landfill Fire merged with the Freeway Fire at 3:30 a.m. PDT on November 16, 2008. At approximately 7:00 a.m. PDT the two fires were officially renamed the Triangle Complex Fire. Around 12:45 p.m. the Triangle Complex Fire had been renamed once again to the Freeway Complex Fire still using the OCFA incident number CA-ORC-08075221. According to the final cause report released by the California Department of Forestry and Fire Protection (CAL FIRE) on January 4, 2010, it was confirmed that the Freeway Fire was caused by a faulty catalytic converter.

== Effects ==
Over a dozen schools were closed during the fire, including those in the Brea Olinda Unified School District, Chino Valley Unified School District, Diamond Bar schools in the Walnut Valley Unified School District, Placentia-Yorba Linda Unified School District and Walnut Valley Unified School District. About 40,000 residents were evacuated during the fire. Areas under mandatory evacuation during the fires included Anaheim, Carbon Canyon, Chino Hills, Corona, Diamond Bar and Yorba Linda

As the fire spread, it forced the closure of the Riverside Freeway (SR 91), the Chino Valley Freeway (SR 71), the 241 Transportation Corridor and the Orange Freeway (SR 57) in northern Orange County. It was calculated that 30,305 acres (122.64 km^{2}) were burned during the fire, which included 90 percent of Chino Hills State Park. The calculated acreage burned would make the fire the fourth largest fire on record in Orange County history behind the 1967 Paseo Grande Fire, Steward Fire of 1958, and the Green River Fire of 1948.

== Causes ==
The preliminary cause of the Freeway Fire was thought to be the result of a vehicle exhaust system igniting roadside vegetation. The fire investigation report was completed by the end of March 2009. According to the final cause report released by CAL FIRE on January 4, 2010, the cause of the fire was a faulty catalytic converter.

The Landfill Fire was investigated by the Brea Police Department, along with investigators from the OCFA. The fire was determined to have been caused by inadequate maintenance of power lines supplying electricity to equipment in the Brea-Olinda Oil Field. The electrical lines were owned by the BreitBurn Management Company in Los Angeles. Investigators believe arcing or a discharge of electric current from the power lines caused the brush near the lines in the fields northeast of Valencia Avenue and Carbon Canyon Road to ignite.

== See also ==
- November 2008 California wildfires
