= Olinda, Brea, California =

Olinda
- Neighborhood of Brea
- Interactive map of Olinda
- Coordinates: 33°55′27″N 117°50′52″W
- Country: United States
- State: California
- County: Orange County
- City: Brea, California

California Historical Landmark
- Reference no.: 918

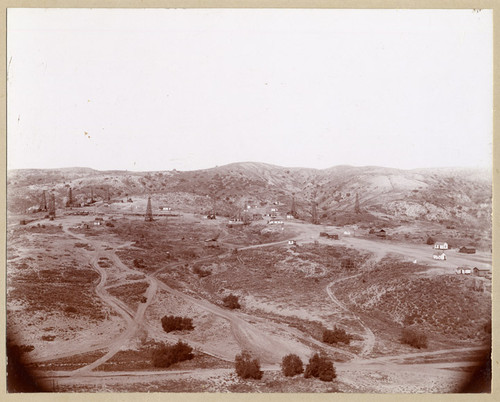
Oil wells in Olinda in 1900

Olinda is a neighborhood in Brea, California, located on Carbon Canyon Road east of the rest of the city. The original village was founded in the 1890s and grew when petroleum was discovered at the adjacent Brea-Olinda Oil Field. In February 1917, Olinda Village and the nearby town of Randolph were incorporated as the city of Brea. The site is now registered as California Historical Landmark #918 registered on January 1. 1978.

Olinda Landfill, located in Carbon Canyon, was opened in 1960 and is scheduled to be closed in December 2021.

The name was revived for a quiet neighborhood built in the hills near the site of the original village, beginning in 1964. The neighborhood has six streets, and holds about 120 homes (many horse properties), and a condominium complex. It is near Carbon Canyon Regional Park and Chino Hills State Park, and surrounded by hills covered with chaparral and home to coyotes, owls, hawks and rattlesnakes.

A Southern California Edison electrical substation in the area is also named Olinda. Olinda gives its name to an elementary school as well as Brea-Olinda High School, which serves Brea and Olinda.

== California Historical Landmark Marker ==
Marker reads:

- NO. 918 OLINDA - From 1897, when oil pioneer Edward L. Doheny brought in the first well, to the 1940s, the boom town of Olinda sprawled over the surrounding hills. To the north was the Chanslor-Candfield Midway Oil Lease and, to the south, the Olinda Crude Oil Lease. Walter Perry Johnson, of Baseball's Hall of Fame, spent his boyhood here.

== See also ==
- California Historical Landmarks in Orange County, California
