= Olinda Landfill =

Municipal landfill

Coordinates: 33°56′19.90″N 117°50′12.42″W

The Olinda Landfill (official name: Olinda Alpha Sanitary Landfill) is a landfill situated in Orange County, California, west of the northern portion of Chino Hills State Park in Carbon Canyon in Olinda neighborhood of Brea City.

Facility size is approximately 565-acre (2.29 km^{2}) with about 420-acre (1.7 km^{2}) permitted for refuse disposal. The landfill has a processing capacity of 8,000 tons per day, while on average it receives 6,800 tons (cca 85% of capacity). City of Brea (where the landfill is situated) alone provides about 30% of the total daily refuse deposited at the facility.

The landfill was opened in 1960. The facility is owned by Orange County and it is operated by Orange County Waste & Recycling Department (formerly County of Orange Integrated Waste Management Department).

The landfill was featured on Cycle 16 of America’s Next Top Model.

Currently the landfill is scheduled to close in December 2021. Plans for postponement of landfill's closure by expansion of its area further into Carbon Canyon just west of Brea Olinda High School were cancelled in 1996 as Land and Water Conservation Fund decided to incorporate adjacent federal lands into Chino Hills State Park, rather than to dedicate it for landfill enlargement. After landfill closure the site will be landscaped to become part of Chino Hills State Park.

== See also ==
- Landfills in the United States
