= Sleepy Hollow, California =

Sleepy Hollow, California may refer to:

- Sleepy Hollow, Marin County, California
- Sleepy Hollow, Chino Hills, California
