= Triangle fire =

Triangle fire may refer to:

- Triangle Shirtwaist Factory fire, a major fire in Manhattan, New York in 1911.
- Freeway Complex Fire, a major wildfire that spread through Orange County in California in 2008.
