= Brea-Olinda Oil Field =

Oil field in Orange and Los Angeles Counties, California, United States

Coordinates: 33.9337°N 117.8623°W

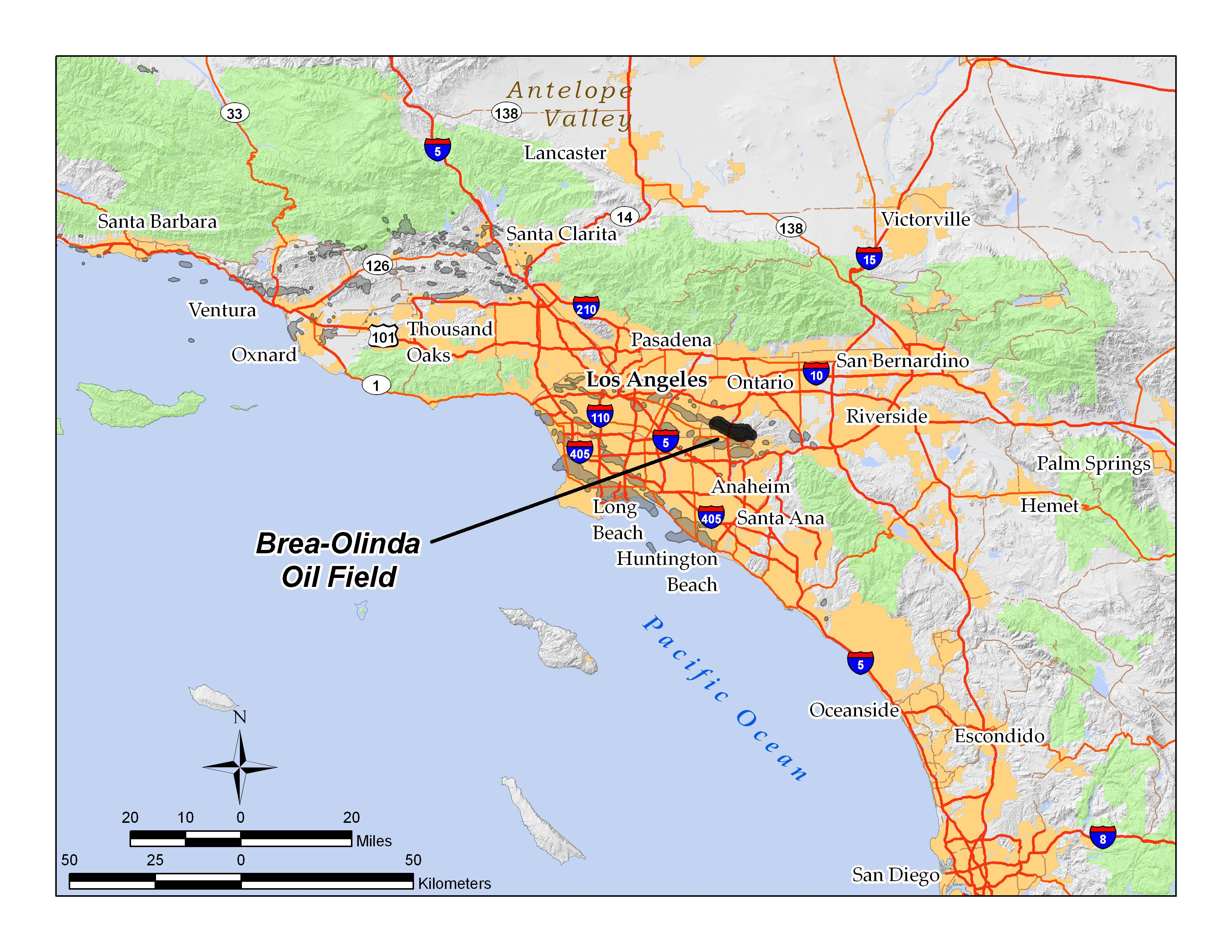
Location of the Brea-Olinda Oil Field in Southern California. Other oil fields are shown in dark gray.

The Brea-Olinda Oil Field is a large oil field in northern Orange County and Los Angeles County, California, along the southern edge of the Puente Hills, about four miles (6 km) northeast of Fullerton, and adjacent to the city of Brea. Discovered in 1880, the field is the sixteenth largest in California by cumulative production, and was the first of California's largest 50 oil fields to be found. It has produced over 430 million barrels of oil in the 130 years since it was first drilled, and retains approximately 20 million barrels in reserve recoverable with current technology. As of the beginning of 2009, 475 wells remained active on the field, operated by several independent oil companies, including Linn Energy, BreitBurn Energy Partners L.P., Cooper & Brain, and Thompson Energy.

== Setting ==
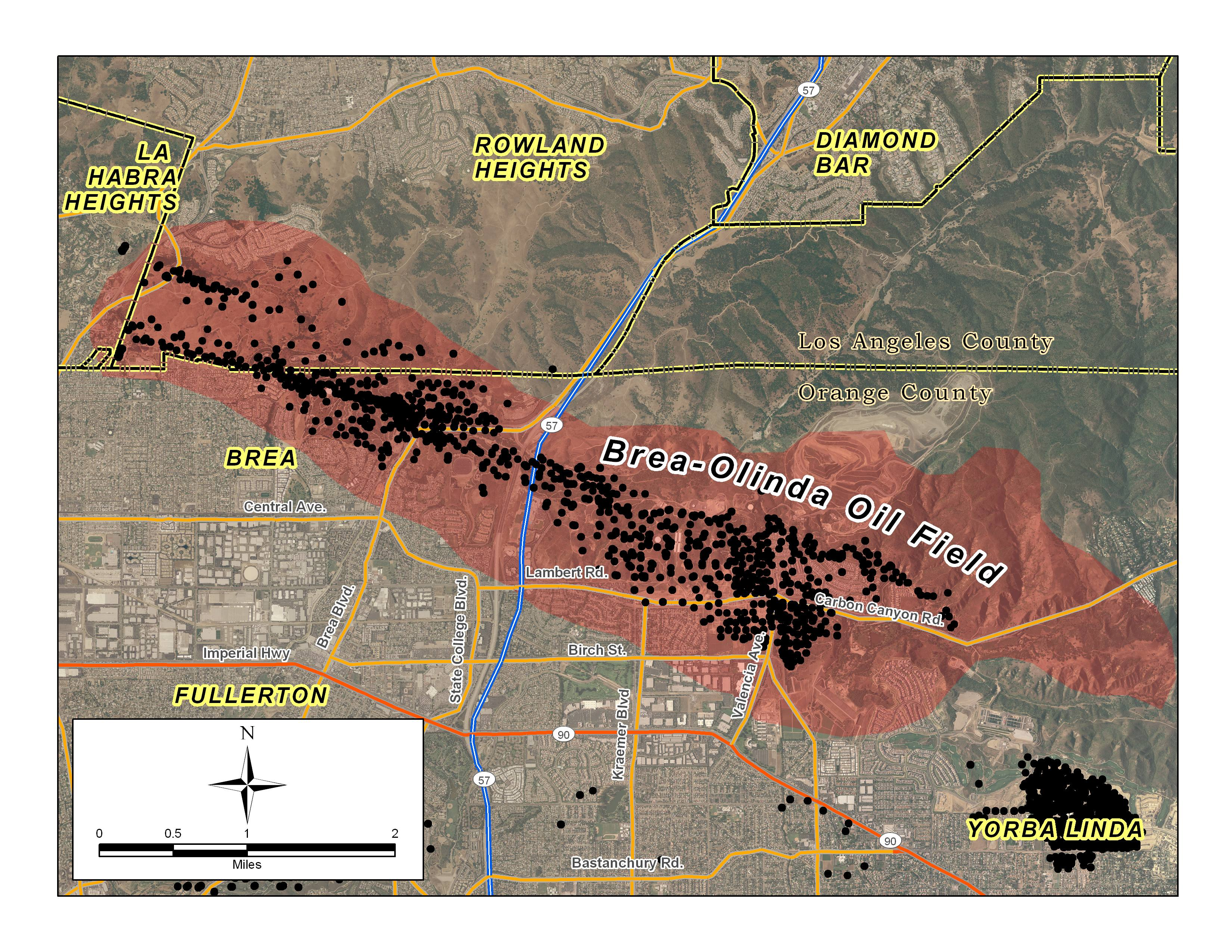
Detail of the Brea-Olinda field and adjacent areas. Black dots are oil wells active as of 2008.

The Brea-Olinda field occupies a long, narrow band along and south of the Whittier Fault Zone, which forms the southern boundary of the Puente/Chino Hills in the inland Los Angeles Basin. It is approximately six miles long overall, with a maximum width of about a mile, running from northwest to southeast, and covering approximately 2,000 acres (8.1 km^{2}). Other oil fields continue in both directions from the Brea-Olinda field along the fault zone, including the Sansinena field to the northwest, followed by the Whittier Oil Field, and the Yorba Linda and Esperanza fields to the southeast. Dense urban and suburban development covers the area south and southwest of the Brea-Olinda field; to the north and northeast, the hills are relatively undeveloped. Elevations on the oil field range from approximately 400 feet (120 m) on the valley floor in the town of Brea, to over 1,400 feet (430 m) in the Puente Hills immediately north of the Los Angeles County line. Carbon Canyon Regional Park is adjacent to the field on the east, as is Chino Hills State Park; the Firestone Boy Scout Reservation occupies a large area in the hills northeast of the main productive area of the field. Lambert Road in Brea, California State Route 142, follows the south edge of the field for much of its length, and the 57 Freeway cuts across it from south to north.

Native vegetation in the hills includes coastal sage scrub, grasslands, oak/walnut woodland, and various riparian habitats. Climate is Mediterranean, with warm summers and cool, moist winters. Runoff from the field is to the south and southwest, either down Carbon Canyon to the Santa Ana River, or southwest down various drainages to the San Gabriel River. Wildfires are a frequent occurrence in the summer and autumn; the point of origin of the Landfill Fire, part of the 2008 Freeway Complex Fire, was on the eastern portion of the field owned by BreitBurn Energy near the landfill.

== Geology ==
In general, the oil field consists of a series of steeply dipping sedimentary beds ending at the Whittier Fault Zone, specifically at the Tonner Fault. Oil has traveled upward from its source rocks within various permeable units, usually ending at the fault when it reaches an impermeable rock type positioned there by motion along the fault. These petroleum-containing formations are themselves broken apart by faults perpendicular to the main Whittier Fault Zone, and each has different characteristics. Occasionally the petroleum-containing formations pinch out within impermeable units prior to reaching the fault. Dips within the section along the fault zone range from 45 to 90 degrees. Tar seeps at the surface – the petroleum signature that alerted early prospectors to the presence of an oil field in the area – exist where oil has found a pathway to the surface either within a permeable unit, or in the broken rock along a fault.

The principal producing formations within the Brea-Olinda field are the Repetto, the Puente, and the Puente-Topanga. Pools are named for the geologic age of the petroleum-bearing formation, and given letters: "1st, 2nd, 3rd Pliocene"; "1st, 2nd, 3rd Pliocene"; "D-1, D-2"; "E, F." The Pliocene pool is produced from an average depth of 1,800 feet (550 m) below ground surface; the Miocene, 4,000; the D-1/D-2 pool, discovered in 1954, 5,000; and the E/F pool, the one discovered in 1880, is only 1,200 feet (370 m) below ground surface. Oil is of variable gravity, with the Pliocene pool having the heaviest oil, with API gravity of only 15-18. Sulfur content is low, and in the early days of the 20th century was the lowest of any oil produced in the state of California.

== History, production, and operations ==
The first recorded well on the field, and the one considered to be the discovery well, was drilled by Rowland & Lacy, later to become the Puente Oil Co., in 1880. While the exact locations of the discovery well and the other earliest wells are not known, the depths have been recorded – between 150 and 260 feet (79 m) – insufficient to penetrate the main oil-bearing rocks, but enough to reach the tar sands which are responsible for the surface seeps that drew the first prospectors to the area. By the mid-1880s, wells were reaching the E/F unit, which has an average depth of 1,200 feet (370 m). This was the first commercial oil production in the Los Angeles Basin, an area which within fifteen years would become the state's most productive area, and in the early 1920s would be producing one-fifth of the world's oil.

Development of the field proceeded over the next three decades, with 105 wells being drilled by 1912 in the area of Brea Canyon, at the time of the survey by the state mineralogist. Many different oil companies, some very small, were working on the field at this time.

Peak production on the field was in 1953, unusual for an old oil field in the Los Angeles Basin; most of the other fields (such as the Los Angeles City, Salt Lake, Beverly Hills, Long Beach) reached their maximum production within several years of their discovery, only attaining a secondary peak with the advent of advanced recovery technologies in the mid-20th century, but the Brea-Olinda field presented a complex geological problem, and new fault blocks continued to be found and produced throughout the first decades of the field's history. As the geology became better understood, and production improved in efficiency and drilling in precision, the overall production from the field rose.

Some enhanced recovery technologies have been used since the 1960s, particularly in the Miocene and Pliocene producing horizons. Steamflooding of the Pliocene commenced in 1973, a method useful for decreasing viscosity of heavy oil and encouraging it to flow to pumping wells. The Miocene pool has been subject to cyclic steam, steamflooding, waterflooding, and fireflooding.

Unocal operated most of the field until March 1996, at which time it sold off all of its California assets to Nuevo Energy. Nuevo operated the field for seven years, finally selling its portion of the field in 2003 for $59 million to BlackSand Partners, L.P., prior to themselves being acquired by Plains Exploration & Production. At that time the field was producing 2,269 barrels per day. BlackSand ran operations on the field for a little over three years, and in 2006 Linn Energy bought it from BlackSand for $291 million. In February 2007 Aera Energy LLC transferred its 654 wells on the field to Linn Energy, leaving Linn as the largest operator on the field. As of 2009 Linn remained the principal operator with 361 active wells, followed by BreitBurn with 73 wells, Cooper & Brain with 21, and Thompson Energy Resources, LLC, with 18.

== See also ==
- Los Angeles Basin
- Los Angeles Basin § Petroleum
