= Chino Hills =

Hill range of the Transverse Ranges in California, United States

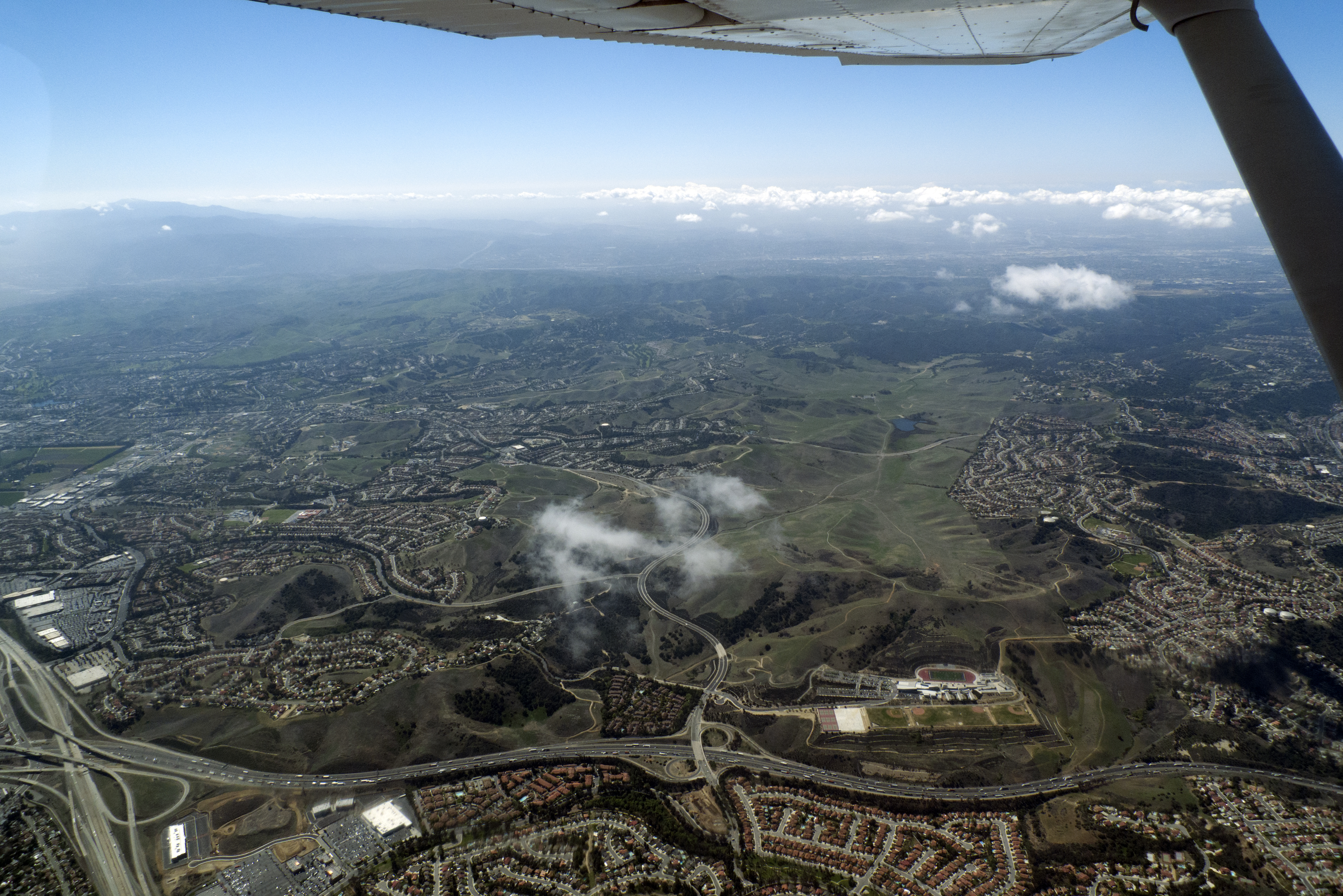

Highest point
- Peak: San Juan Hill
- Elevation: 1,781 ft (543 m)

Geography
- Location within California Location within the United States
- Country: United States of America
- State: California
- District: San Bernardino County
- Range coordinates: 33°56′2.051″N 117°44′16.199″W
- Topo map: USGS Prado Dam

The Chino Hills (/ˈtʃiːnoʊ/ CHEE-noh; chino being Spanish for 'curly') are a mountain range on the border of Orange, Los Angeles, and San Bernardino counties, California, with a small portion in Riverside County. Chino Hills State Park preserves open space and habitat in them.

== Geography ==
The Chino Hills are separated from the Santa Ana Mountains to the south by the Santa Ana River (Santa Ana Canyon). On the northwest, Brea Canyon separates the Chino Hills from the Puente Hills. To the north of the Puente Hills and San Jose Creek lie the San Jose Hills. The only paved road crossing the Chino Hills is Carbon Canyon Road (State Route 142).

== Flora ==
The Chino Hills are in the California chaparral and woodlands ecoregion of the California Floristic Province. The California native plants here are in the chaparral and oak woodland plant communities, with remnant stands of native grasses of California.

== Chino Hills earthquake ==
On July 29, 2008, a magnitude 5.4 earthquake was located 3 miles (4.8 km) southwest of Chino Hills that was felt throughout Southern California and felt as far east as the Las Vegas Valley and as far south as San Diego. It occurred at 11:42 am PDT and caused structural damage to buildings, including to St. Jude Centers for Rehabilitation and Wellness and to the Pomona City Hall. Water mains were ruptured in limited areas of Los Angeles, and superficial damage was done to the facades of businesses and other buildings. Many businesses, including Wal-Mart, reported damage to merchandise which was knocked to the floor and South Coast Plaza in Costa Mesa suffered damage to a portion of the ceiling which was knocked to the chair of a restaurant.

There were reports of minor injuries but no fatalities.

== Fauna ==
The cliff swallows of Mission San Juan Capistrano nest in Chino Hills. Thousands of the small birds, up from 'wintering' in Argentina, have built their mud nests in the eaves of the Vellano Country Club, a community situated around a golf course in the hills.

== Adjacent ranges ==
- Puente Hills
- San Rafael Hills
- San Joaquin Hills
- Santa Ana Mountains
- San Gabriel Mountains
- San Bernardino Mountains

== See also ==
- Pasinogna, California
- Rancho Santa Ana del Chino
