= Santa Ana Canyon =

Water gap in California, US

Coordinates: 33°51′25″N 117°49′06″W

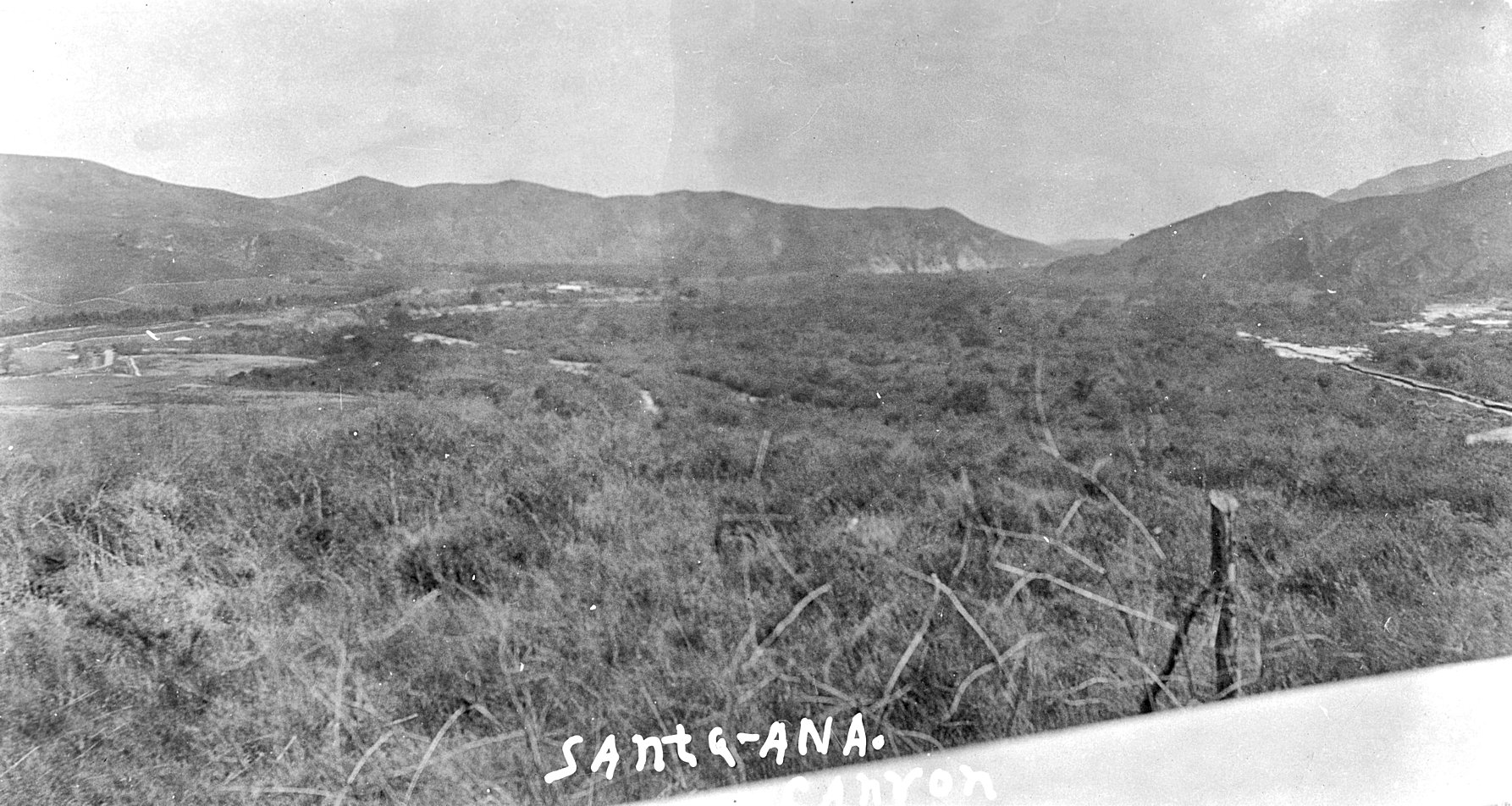
Santa Ana Canyon (date unknown)

Santa Ana Canyon (Spanish: Cañón de Santa Ana), or the Santa Ana Narrows, is the water gap where the Santa Ana River passes between the Santa Ana Mountains and the Chino Hills, near the intersection of Orange, Riverside, and San Bernardino counties, California. It receives particularly strong Santa Ana winds in comparison to surrounding areas, hence the name. Originally, U.S. Route 91 ran through the canyon; however, it has long since been re-signed or upgraded along the entirety of its former right-of-way in the state. California State Route 91 is its primary successor.

== History ==
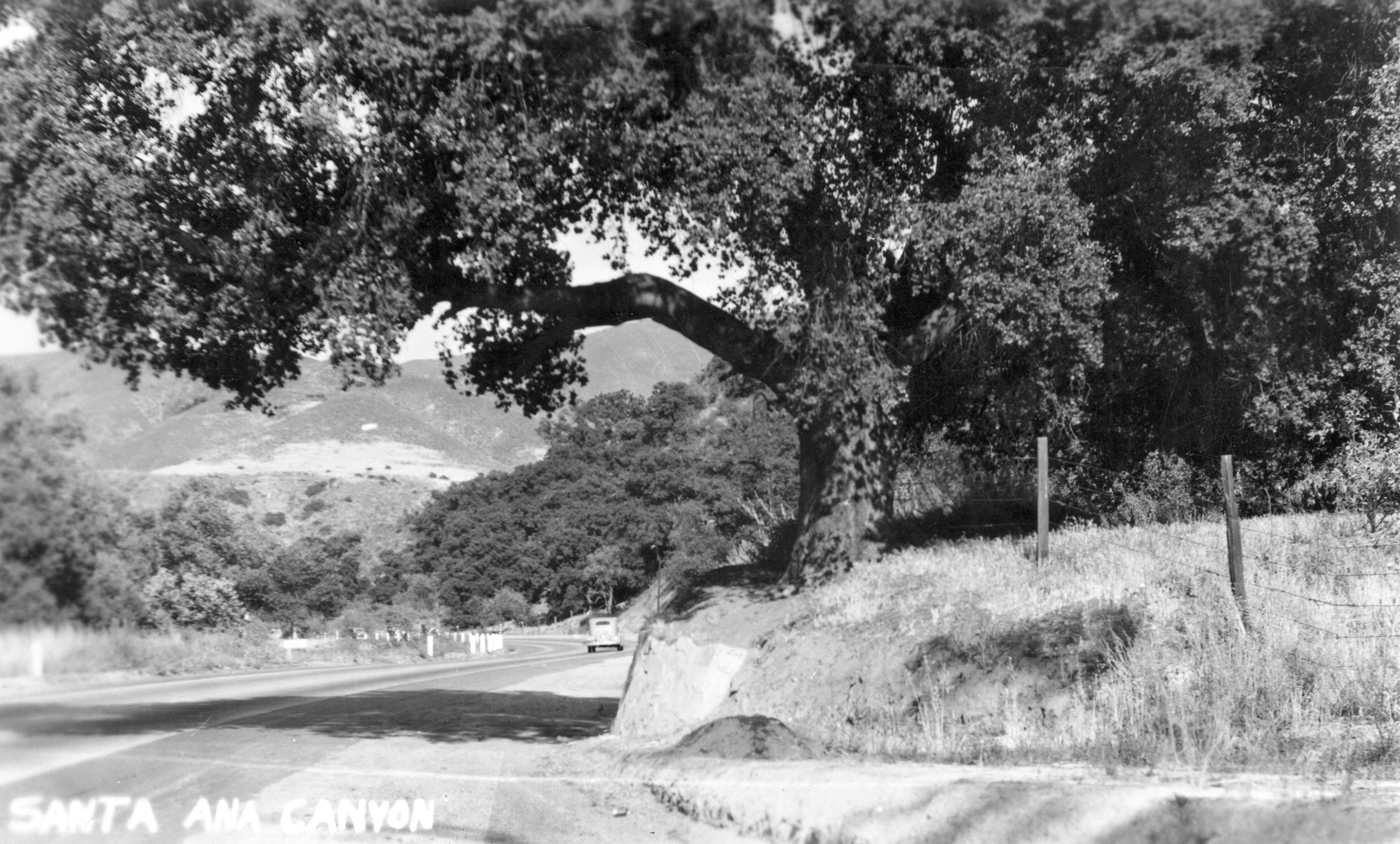
Santa Ana Canyon Road (1930s)

An "Indian trail" was present in the area that would become named Santa Ana Canyon. This trail was used by Benjamin Wilson, who used it to reach what he would name Big Bear Valley in 1845. The trail became known among fur trappers, hunters, and prospectors seeking to reach the valley. It was used widely during the gold rush in the San Bernardino Mountains, which began in the spring of 1860. This trail served as the primary means of passage to the Big Bear area up until the Santa Ana flood of 1916, when most of it was destroyed.

=== 2008 fire ===
The Freeway Complex Fire of November 2008 raged through Santa Ana Canyon. It ultimately destroyed hundreds of homes in the area and forced multiple road and school closures. In addition, thousands of residents in the canyon were under mandatory evacuation orders at one point or another and could not reenter their neighborhoods. This was the largest wildfire in Santa Ana Canyon since 1969, when fewer people lived there, making the Freeway Complex Fire much more dangerous.

=== 2017 fire ===
On October 9, 2017, the Canyon Fire 2 broke out near the interchange for California State Route 91 and California State Route 241 on the border of the City of Anaheim. The Canyon Fire 2 was the second fire in the same area in a matter of weeks, the first fire was designated the Canyon Fire.

Canyon Fire 2 was driven by fast moving winds and low humidity. By noon on the day the fire began, it had burned 800 acres (1.3 sq mi). By 2:30, fueled by high winds and low humidity, it had burned 2,000 acres (3.1 sq mi) and was 0 percent contained.

Canyon Fire 2 led to the evacuation of 16,570 residents of Yorba Linda, Anaheim, Orange, North Tustin, Orange Park Acres and Tustin and the destruction of 25 homes located in Anaheim Hills and Orange.

== Recreation ==
The Santa Ana River bicycle path runs through the canyon. This recreational path was constructed on the bank of the river and abuts the length of Yorba Regional Park in Anaheim. The bike trail, as it is referred to by locals, roughly parallels SR 91 in certain areas, extending all the way to Pacific Coast Highway (SR 1) on the Pacific coast. Across SR 1 lies Santa Ana River County Beach, which shares a border with Huntington State Beach.

== Highways ==
It is the namesake of Santa Ana Canyon Road, which is a thoroughfare that parallels the Riverside Freeway (SR 91) from the Anaheim-Orange line to Gypsum Canyon Road in Yorba Linda.

La Palma Avenue is a much longer arterial road than Santa Ana Canyon Road, stretching from Torrance to Yorba Linda uninterrupted. The arterial begins at Vermont Avenue in Torrance as Del Amo Boulevard and continues through Carson, Long Beach, Lakewood and Cerritos. At Coyote Creek, Del Amo Boulevard leaves Los Angeles County and enters Orange County as La Palma Avenue in the city of La Palma. The arterial continues through Buena Park, Anaheim and to Yorba Linda where La Palma terminates after its intersection with Gypsum Canyon Road.

=== Traffic ===
The Eastern Transportation Corridor (SR 241 toll road) itself ends at State Route 91 as well. As a result of the confluence of these three routes at State Route 91 in Santa Ana Canyon, there is often a bottleneck of eastbound traffic during evening rush hour that begins there and continues across the county line and into Corona. Worsening the bottleneck further is the southern terminus of Corona Expressway (SR 71) just beyond that.

However, there are numerous projects in the planning stages that are aimed at alleviating traffic through the canyon and into Corona and Riverside. Among them are lane additions and interchange improvements, some of which will not be completed until 2030. One proposal is to entirely bypass the canyon by drilling through the Santa Ana Mountains to provide an east–west connection from SR 241 directly to Interstate 15. Another possible option could be to extend Green River Road to connect to La Palma Avenue, though this likely will never happen.

=== 91 Express Lanes ===
As seen on their official site, the 91 Express Lanes pass through the Santa Ana Canyon. Their goal was to relieve some of the traffic that SR 91 carries daily; previously, they ended at Green River Road, without continuing further into Corona. As of March 20, 2017, an 8-mile extension of the 91 Express Lanes was completed that terminates after passing I-15 when headed eastbound.

The 91 Express Lanes is a four-lane, 18-mile toll road built in the median of the Riverside Freeway (State Route 91) between Interstate 15 (I-15) and California State Route 55 (SR 55). A connecting ramp from SR 91 eastbound to I-15 southbound, as well as the parallel I-15 northbound to SR 91 westbound connecting ramp, opened March 20, 2017.

When the 91 Express Lanes opened in 1995 between SR 55 and Green River Road, the facility boasted several firsts — the first privately financed toll road in the U.S. in more than 50 years, the world's first fully automated toll facility, and the first application of value pricing in America.

91 Express Lanes customers pay tolls from pre-paid accounts, using a FasTrak transponder — a pocket-sized radio transmission device mounted to the inside of their vehicle's windshield. This electronic toll collection technology eliminates the need to stop and pay tolls at traditional tollbooths, thus ensuring the free flow of traffic on the 91 Express Lanes.

The 91 Express Lanes was born from the need for congestion relief on the 91 Freeway when no public funds were available to solve this critical transportation problem. The concept was unique — the private sector would take the risk and the State would get congestion relief at no cost to taxpayers.

On a wider scale, the 91 Express Lanes has contributed to major advances in the toll industry worldwide. The facility has been featured in the national and international media. Since the project opened in 1995, transportation officials from 21 U.S. states and 23 countries have visited the 91 Express Lanes to study its advanced systems and operations.

== Railroad ==
The BNSF Railway's Southern Transcon runs through the canyon. Passenger trains in service through the canyon are the Amtrak Southwest Chief as well as Metrolink's 91/Perris Valley Line and Inland Empire–Orange County Line.

== See also ==
- Freeway Complex Fire
- Yorba Linda
- Anaheim
- Anaheim Hills
- Santa Ana River bike trail
- U.S. Route 91
