= California State Route 142 =

Highway in California

State Route 142
- SR 142 highlighted in red

Route information
- Maintained by Caltrans
- Length: 11.467 mi (18.454 km)

Major junctions
- West end: SR 90 in Brea
- East end: SR 71 in Chino Hills

Location
- Country: United States
- State: California
- Counties: Orange, San Bernardino

Highway system
- State highways in California; Interstate; US; State; Scenic; History; Pre‑1964; Unconstructed; Deleted; Freeways
| ← SR 140 | → SR 143 |

State Route 142 (SR 142), also known as Carbon Canyon Road for most of its length, is a state highway in the U.S. state of California that connects Brea in Orange County with Chino Hills in San Bernardino County. The eastern portion of the route is known as Chino Hills Parkway.

Running from State Route 90, Imperial Highway, in Brea to State Route 71 in Chino Hills, SR 142 is a popular shortcut from the business centers of Brea and surrounding Orange County to the Inland Empire. The road has multiple tight curves, so travel is not recommended for long vehicles, such as big rigs.

== Route description ==
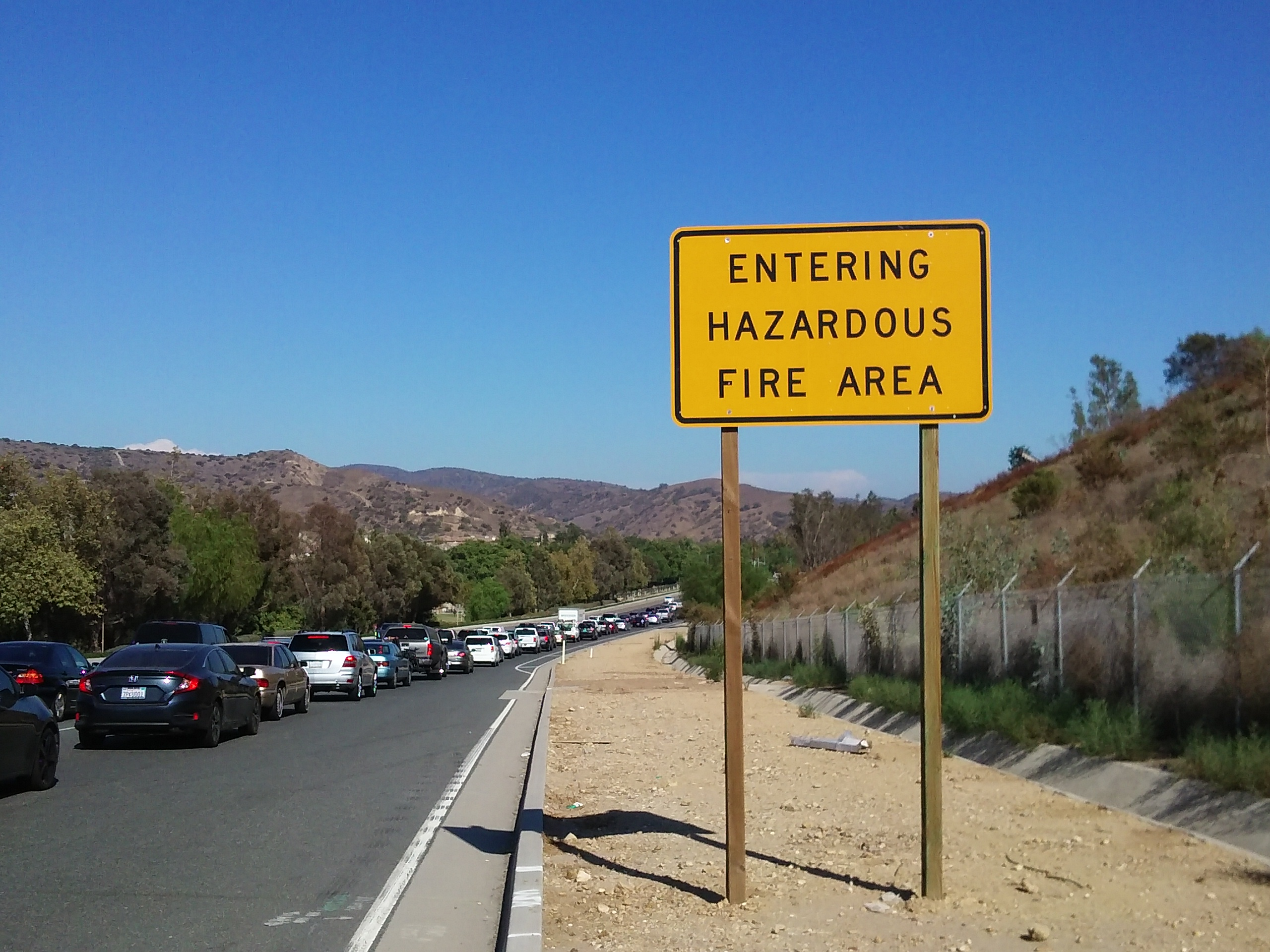
Backed up traffic on Carbon Canyon road

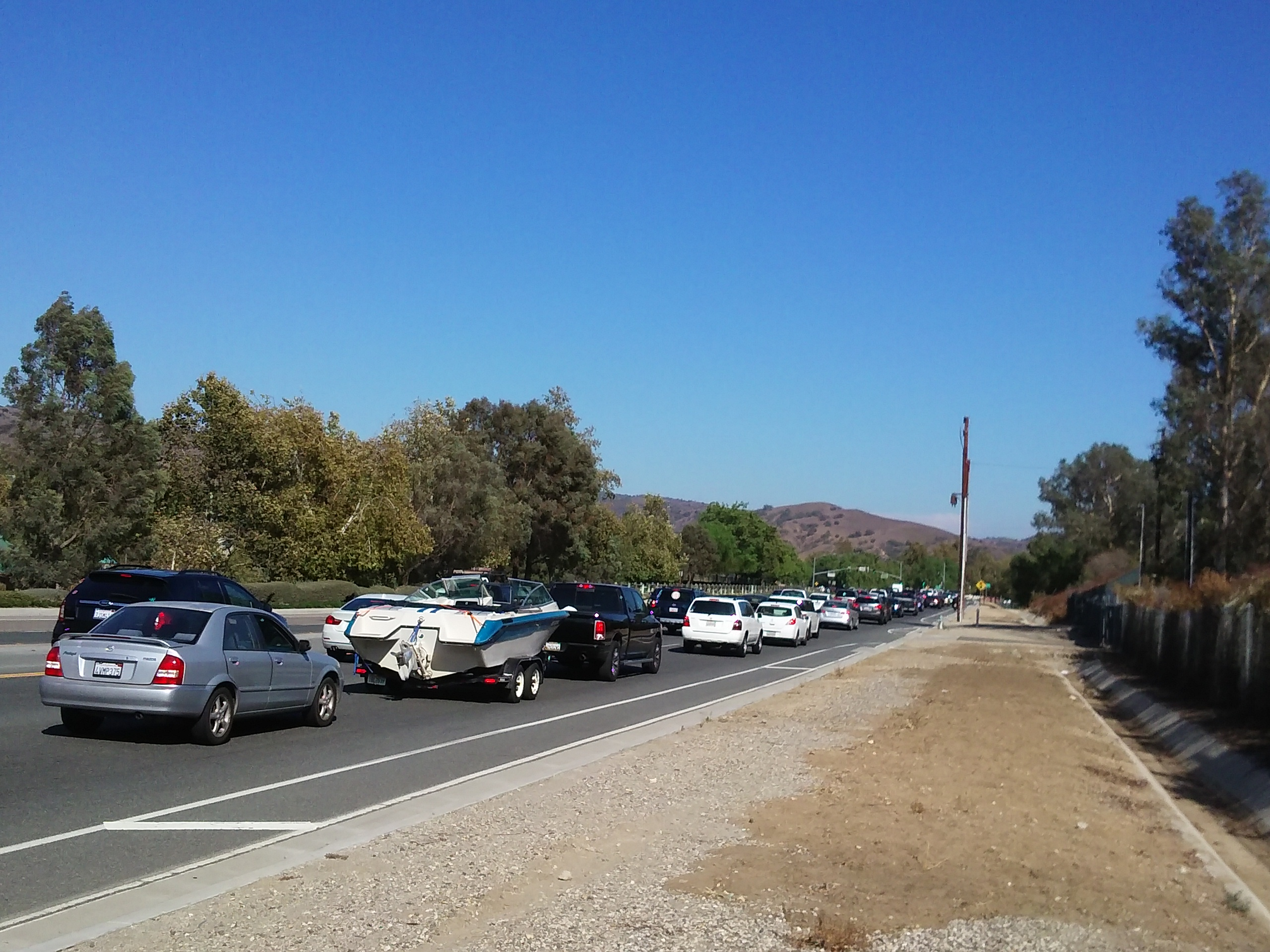
Carbon Canyon road at the Brea side

Route 142 is defined in section 442 of the California Streets and Highways Code:

Route 142 is from:
(a) Route 90 near Brea to Route 71 near Chino.
(b) Route 71 near Chino to Route 210 near Upland.

Route 142 is not fully constructed to extend east to Upland as it is defined.

SR 142 begins in the city of Brea as Valencia Avenue at a junction with SR 90. The road heads northeast to an intersection with Carbon Canyon Road, which assumes the designation of SR 142 and continues east through Carbon Canyon Regional Park. SR 142 continues into the community of Olinda before crossing into the Sleepy Hollow area of the city of Chino Hills in San Bernardino County.

SR 142 continues northeast through Chino Hills to an intersection, where it continues eastbound on Chino Hills Parkway. The highway ends at an interchange with SR 71 on the border of Chino Hills and Chino, near the California Institution for Men, a state prison.

SR 142 is part of the California Freeway and Expressway System, and is part of the National Highway System, a network of highways that are considered essential to the country's economy, defense, and mobility by the Federal Highway Administration. SR 142 is eligible to be included in the State Scenic Highway System, but it is not officially designated as a scenic highway by the California Department of Transportation.

== History ==
In 1933, a road from Brea to Chino was added to the state highway system. It was designated as Route 177 in 1935. In the 1964 state highway renumbering, this became part of SR 142. A routing from Chino to Upland was added to the state highway system as Route 274 in 1959, and was added to SR 142 in the 1964 renumbering from SR 71 to SR 30 (later SR 210), but no highway has been built along that route.

== Major intersections ==
Except where prefixed with a letter, postmiles were measured on the road as it was in 1964, based on the alignment that existed at the time, and do not necessarily reflect current mileage. Postmile prefixes include: R reflecting a realignment in the route since then, M indicating a second realignment, L referring to an overlap due to a correction or change, and T indicating postmiles classified as temporary. Segments that remain unconstructed or have been relinquished to local control may be omitted. The numbers reset at county lines; the start and end postmiles in each county are given in the county column.

| County | Location | Postmile | Destinations | Notes |
|---|---|---|---|---|
| Orange; ORA R0.75-6.35 | Brea | R0.75 | Valencia Avenue south | Continuation beyond SR 90 |
| Orange; ORA R0.75-6.35 | Brea | R0.75 | SR 90 (Imperial Highway) | West end of SR 142/overlap with Valencia Avenue |
| Orange; ORA R0.75-6.35 | Brea | R1.45 | Rose Drive, Birch Street | |
| Orange; ORA R0.75-6.35 | Brea | R1.85 | Lambert Road, Valencia Avenue north | East end of overlap with Valencia Avenue; west end of overlap with Carbon Canyon Road |
| San Bernardino; SBD 0.00-5.78 | Chino Hills | 3.90 | Chino Hills Parkway west, Rustic Drive | East end of overlap with Carbon Canyon Road; west end of overlap with Chino Hills Parkway |
| San Bernardino; SBD 0.00-5.78 | Chino Hills | 5.78 | SR 71 (Chino Valley Freeway) | Interchange; east end of SR 142/overlap with Chino Hills Parkway; SR 71 exit 8 |
| San Bernardino; SBD 0.00-5.78 | Chino Hills | 5.78 | Chino Hills Parkway east | Continuation beyond SR 71 |
1.000 mi = 1.609 km; 1.000 km = 0.621 mi
