= Brea-Olinda Unified School District =

School district in California

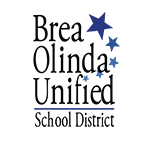

Address
- 1 Civic Center Cir Level 2 Brea, Orange County, California, 92821; United States
- Coordinates: 33.917163°N 117.888913°W

District information
- Type: Public
- Grades: K-12
- President: Deana Miller
- Vice-president: Paul Ruiz
- NCES District ID: 0605880

Students and staff
- Students: 6,008
- Staff: 231.40
- Student–teacher ratio: 25.96

Other information
- Website: bousd.us

Brea Olinda Unified School District is the school district serving the City of Brea in Orange County, California, United States. It also serves portions of the nearby cities of Fullerton, Yorba Linda and La Habra.

The school district consists of:

- 6 elementary schools
- 1 junior high school
- 1 high school
- 1 continuation high school
- 1 online academy (K-6)

== History ==
In 1994, the school district had the lowest dropout rate of all the districts in Orange County at 13 students, making up 0.5% of the district's students.

== District leadership ==
=== Board of trustees ===
The Brea Olinda Unified School District has a five-member board. Each member is elected to a four-year term of office. The current trustees are:

- Deana Miller - board president
- Paul Ruiz - board vice president/clerk
- Chris Becerra, Ed.D. - board trustee
- Carrie Flanders - board trustee
- Gail Lyons - board trustee

The board of trustees is responsible for policy-making for the school district.

=== Superintendent ===
The board of trustees appoints a professional to oversee the day-to-day operations of the school district. The current superintendent of schools is Brinda C. Leon, who acts as the chief executive officer of the school district as well as the secretary to the board of trustees. She has three assistant superintendents: Dr. Valerie Rogers for human resources, Rick Champion for business services, and Dr. Phil D'Agostino for educational services.

== Schools ==
Brea Olinda Unified consists of 10 schools: six elementary schools, one junior high school, one high school, one continuation high school, and one online academy (K-6).

=== Elementary schools ===
- Arovista Elementary School
- Brea Country Hills Elementary School
- Falcon Academy of Science and Technology
- Laurel Elementary Magnet School of Innovation & Career Exploration
- Mariposa Elementary School
- Olinda Elementary School

=== Online elementary school ===
- Brea Online Academy

=== Junior high school ===
- Brea Junior High School

=== High school ===
- Brea Olinda High School

=== Continuation high school ===
- Brea Canyon High School

== District achievements ==
=== California Distinguished Schools ===
- Arovista Elementary School
- Brea Country Hills Elementary School
- Brea Junior High School
- Brea Olinda High School
- Brea Online Academy
- Mariposa Elementary School
- Olinda Elementary School

=== California Gold Ribbon Schools ===
- Arovista Elementary School
- Laurel Elementary Magnet School of Innovation & Career Exploration
- Falcon Academy of Science & Technology

=== Title I Academic Achievement Award (CDE) ===
- Arovista Elementary School
- Laurel Elementary Magnet School of Innovation & Career Exploration

=== National Blue Ribbon Schools of Excellence ===
- Brea Olinda High School
- Olinda Elementary School

=== Golden Bell Award ===
- Brea Olinda Unified School District (Career Technical Education)
- Laurel Magnet School Career Exploration Program (Community Schools Through Partnerships & Collaboration)

=== Model Continuation School ===
Brea Canyon High School

=== API scores ===
Eight of Brea Olinda's nine schools are now over 800 with their API scores.

=== Orange County Teachers of the Year ===
- Jeff Sink, Brea Olinda High School (1998)
- Scott Malloy, Brea Olinda High School (2000)

=== California Teacher of the Year ===
- Scott Malloy, Brea Olinda High School (2000)

=== Athletic achievements ===
==== National championships ====
- Brea Olinda High School girls' basketball, 1994 (USA Today), 2009 (MaxPreps)
- Cheer, 2009, 2010, 2012, 2013 (USA), 2020 (UCA)

==== California state championships ====
- Brea Olinda High School girls' basketball, 1989, 1991, 1992, 1993, 1994, 1998, 1999, 2000, 2009, 2016
- Brea Olinda High School boys' cross country, 2014, 2015

==== CIF championships ====
- Brea Olinda High School football, 1959, 1961, 1962, 1963 (A-Division), 2001
- Brea Olinda High School boys' soccer, 1986, 2001
- Brea Olinda High School girls' basketball, 1986, 1989, 1990, 1991, 1992, 1993, 1994, 1995, 1996, 1997, 1998, 1999, 2001, 2004, 2006, 2007, 2009, 2010
- Brea Olinda High School cross country, 2010, 2013, 2014
- Brea Olinda High School girls' swimming, 1987,1988, 1991, 1992, 2001, 2002
- Brea Olinda High School boys' swimming 1988
- Brea Olinda High School boys' golf, 2008
- Brea Olinda High School cheer, 2020

== Brea Education Foundation ==
=== History ===
The non-profit Brea Education Foundation (BEF), a community of parents, neighbors, and business leaders, was begun in 2005 to support all students in the Brea Olinda Unified School District (BOUSD). In these times of shrinking school budgets, the foundation focuses on funding three main areas: technology, science and the arts.

=== Board of directors ===
- Ric Clough, chair
- Diana Maldonado, co-chair
- Abhishek Tiwari, secretary
- Andrew Todd, treasurer
- Paul Ruiz, school board representative
- Shirley Lee
- Lori Sherman
- Brandie Runner
- Nicole Colon
- Brinda Leon, advisor

== See also ==
- List of school districts in Orange County, California
