= Carbon Canyon Regional Park =

Park in Orange County, California

- Carbon Canyon Park
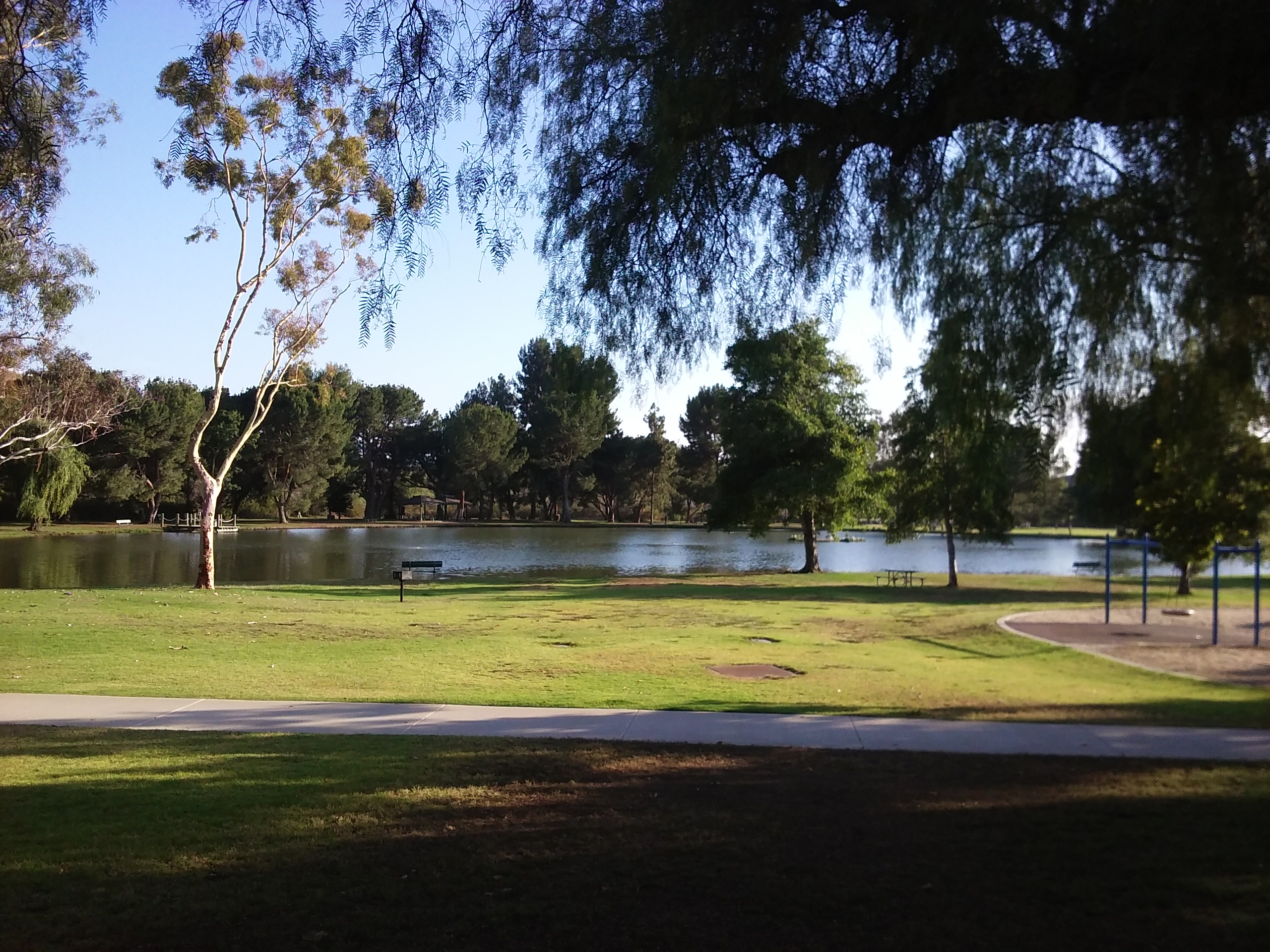
- The lake that is found in the center of the park.

- Location within southern California
- Interactive map of Carbon Canyon Regional Park
- Location: Brea, California, United States
- Coordinates: 33.920°N 117.837°W
- Area: 124 acres (50 ha)
- Opening: c. 1975
- Owner: Orange County Parks
- Open: Fall–Winter: 7AM–6PM; Spring–Summer: 7AM–9PM
- Terrain: Hilly
- Water: 1 lake
- Website: ocparks.com

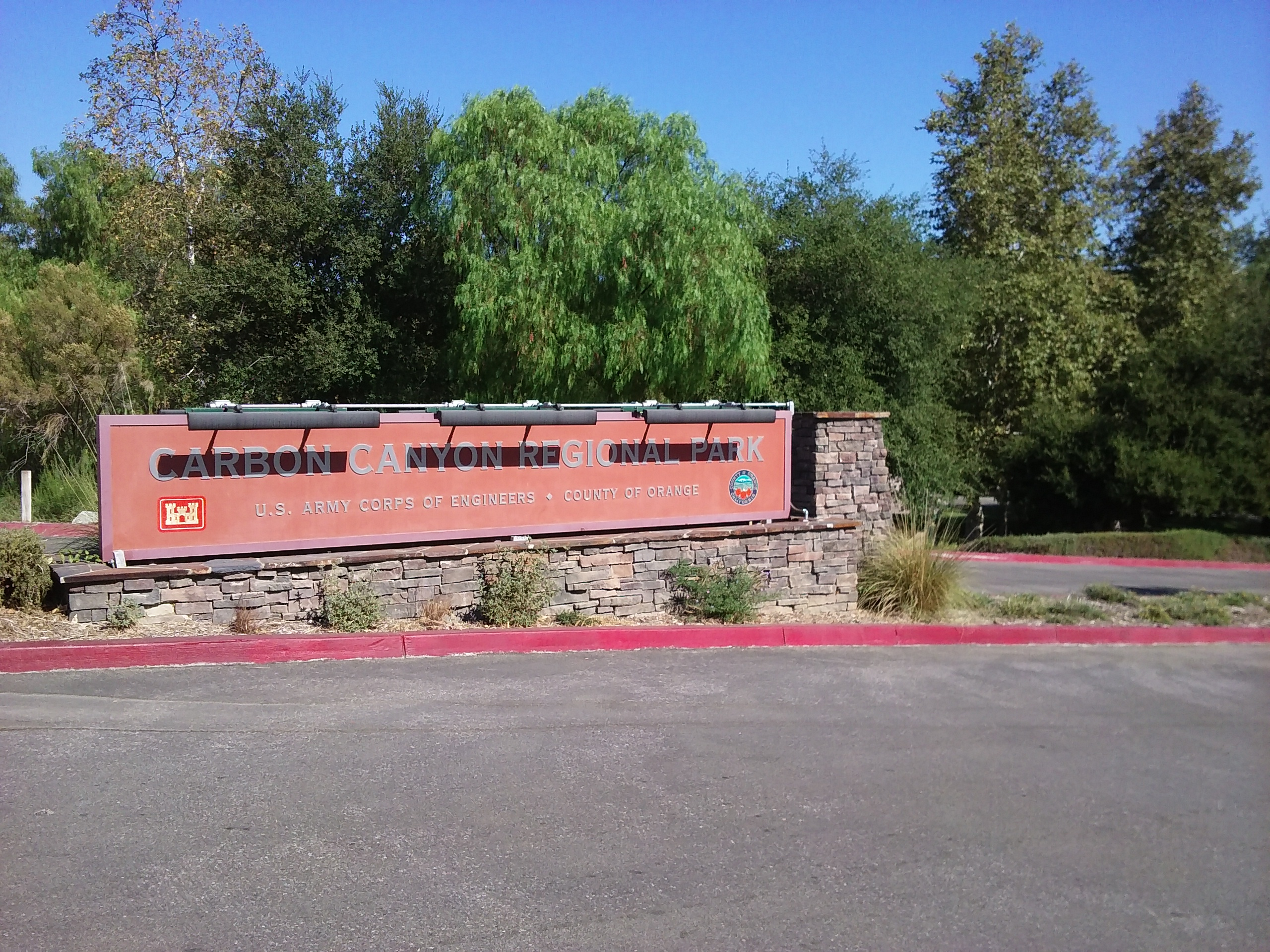
Main sign of the park during the summer

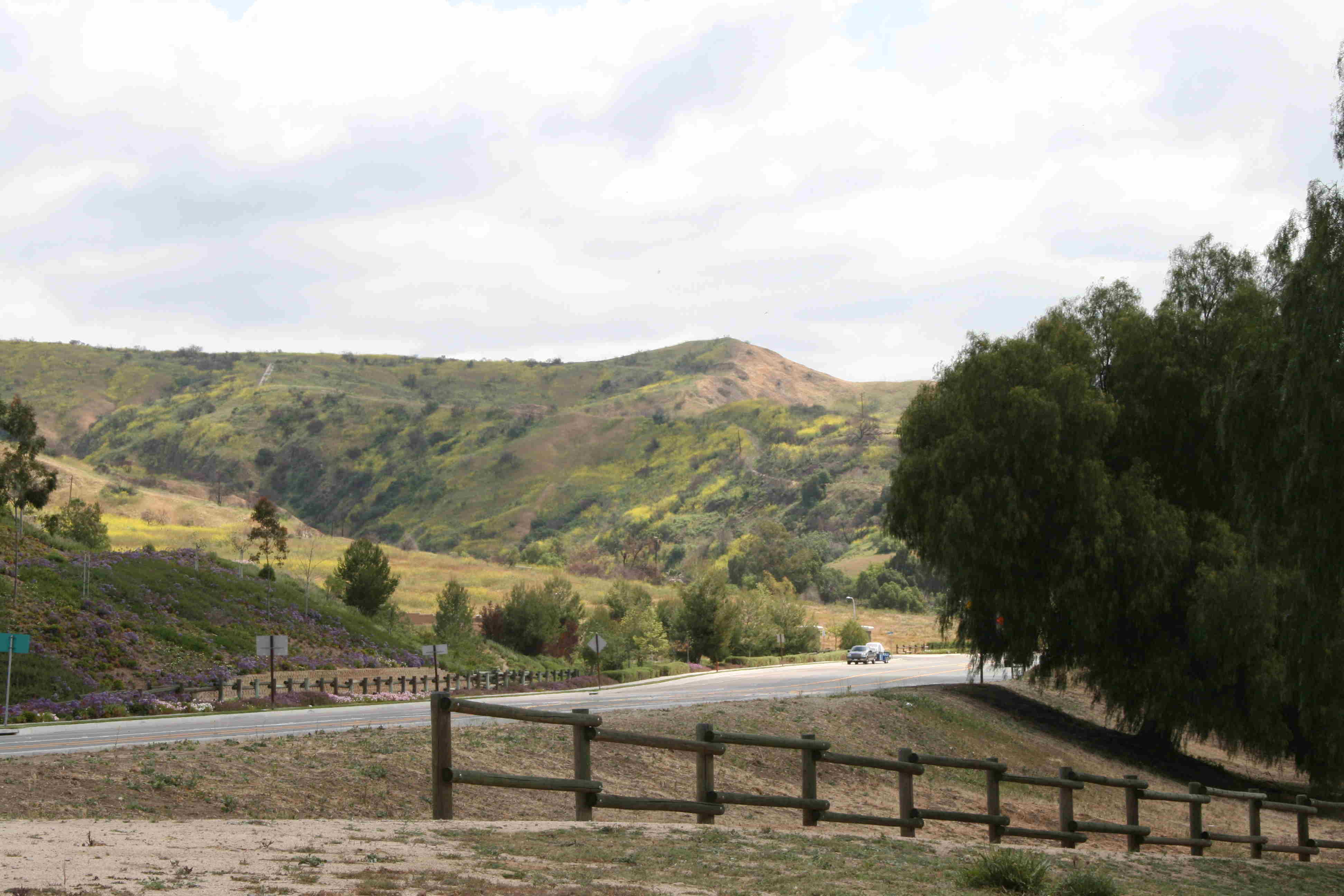
Horse trail that leads into the park

Carbon Canyon Regional Park (or simply Carbon Canyon Park) is a regional park in Brea, California, that was created after the Carbon Canyon Creek was dammed. It links up with Chino Hills State Park on the east side. The park also is home to a small forest of Redwood trees, which have been struggling to survive since the start of the 2010 California drought.

== History ==
The park area used to be the town of Olinda just before the 1880s. When a dam on Carbon Canyon Creek was built to prevent flooding, the area became a park.

The lake in the center of the park was rebuilt in 2014 due to reduced water quality and capacity, which resulted in OC Parks not being able to immediately stock the lake with fish. Demolition of the existing lake began on July 14, 2014. The lake had to be drained completely in order for heavy equipment to be used to remove approximately 9,500 cubic yards of silt. The silt had accumulated under the lake over the course of 17 years from runoff and wildfires. Removal of the silt was started in August 2014. Removal was completed in October 2014 and the process of refilling the lake started. Fish were stocked approximately a month after the refilling was completed.

=== Redwood Grove ===
A three-acre grove (1.2 ha) of Coastal Sequoia redwood trees (Sequoia sempervirens) reside within the park's boundaries and is host to various species of birds, rabbits, squirrels, chipmunks and fauna. The grove was established in the 1970s using planted saplings and is located outside the species' natural range, which is typically limited to coastal regions of northern California and southern Oregon. As a result, the trees grow under climate conditions that differ from those of native redwood forests, including higher temperatures and reduced atmospheric moisture.

In their native habitat, coast redwoods are typically associated with cool, moist environments and frequently rely on coastal fog as a supplemental water source. Fog drip is the process in which water condenses on foliage and falls to the ground. This additional input contributes a substantial portion of annual water input in redwood ecosystems and influences local humidity and soil moisture conditions. In inland or southern locations where fog is less frequent, these processes are reduced, and tree growth and survival can be more dependent on soil moisture and water availability.

The grove was threatened in 2008 by the Triangle Fire and by the California drought from 2010 to 2016. Prolonged drought conditions have been shown to be associated with increased physiological stress in redwoods growing outside their optimal range, particularly in areas lacking consistent fog input. The staff at Carbon Canyon Park met with specialists from UC Irvine and Disneyland in order to put a new system in place to help sustain the grove through drought. A tree was cut down in 2015 due to it being sick and near death.

Reported through the article "California's most unexpected redwood grove is in an Orange County park," the SF Gate has noted that the grove is maintained as an artificial ecosystem, including regular irrigation and soil management. This additional infrastructure is meant to compensate for the region's relatively dry climate and lack of persistent coastal fog that the redwoods would otherwise rely on. Observations at the site indicate localized cooling and increased soil moisture within the grove compared to surrounding areas. These changes likely reflect the influence of the layered canopy cover and additional irrigation on the microclimate conditions, maintained in part by the redwood trees "capstone species" qualities. The grove continues to serve as a recreational and educational resource, attracting visitors interested in experiencing coast redwoods outside their native range.

== Facilities ==
Carbon Canyon Regional Park has the following facilities:

- Cross Country course (Cal State Fullerton)
- Tennis courts
- Volleyball courts
- Playgrounds
- Man-made lake
- Fishing platforms
- Restrooms
- Outdoor shelters
- Nature, horse, hiking trails, & a historic dam

The park is used by people who want to have picnics or to celebrate holidays. The hiking trail to the Redwood forest also attracts hikers. It is also a frequent training and competitive area for various cross country teams.

=== Fire fighting ===
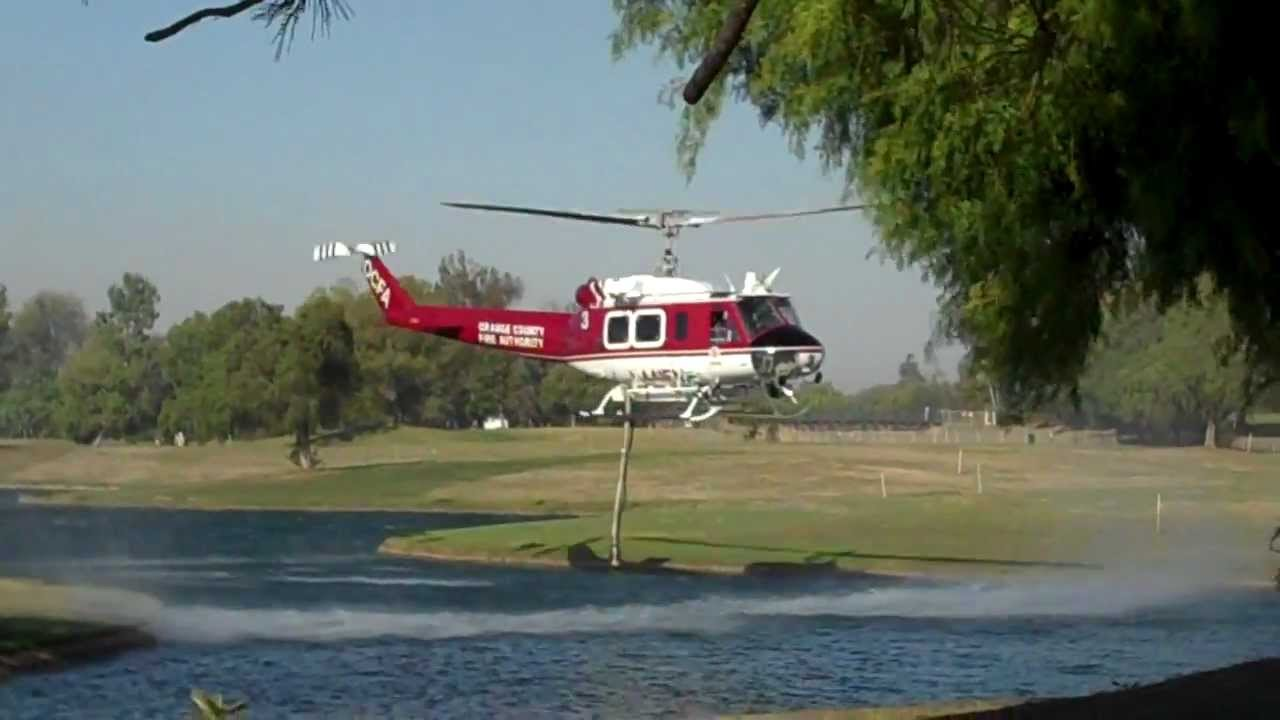
OCFA helicopter extracting water from the lake in the park

The lake in the park is often used to fill fire fighting helicopters when responding to fires in the area.

It was used during the Triangle Fire in 2008 as the fire was threatening the eastern side of the city of Brea; including the Hollydale, Olinda Village, and Olinda Ranch communities, alongside Carbon Canyon Regional Park.
