= Brea Olinda High School =

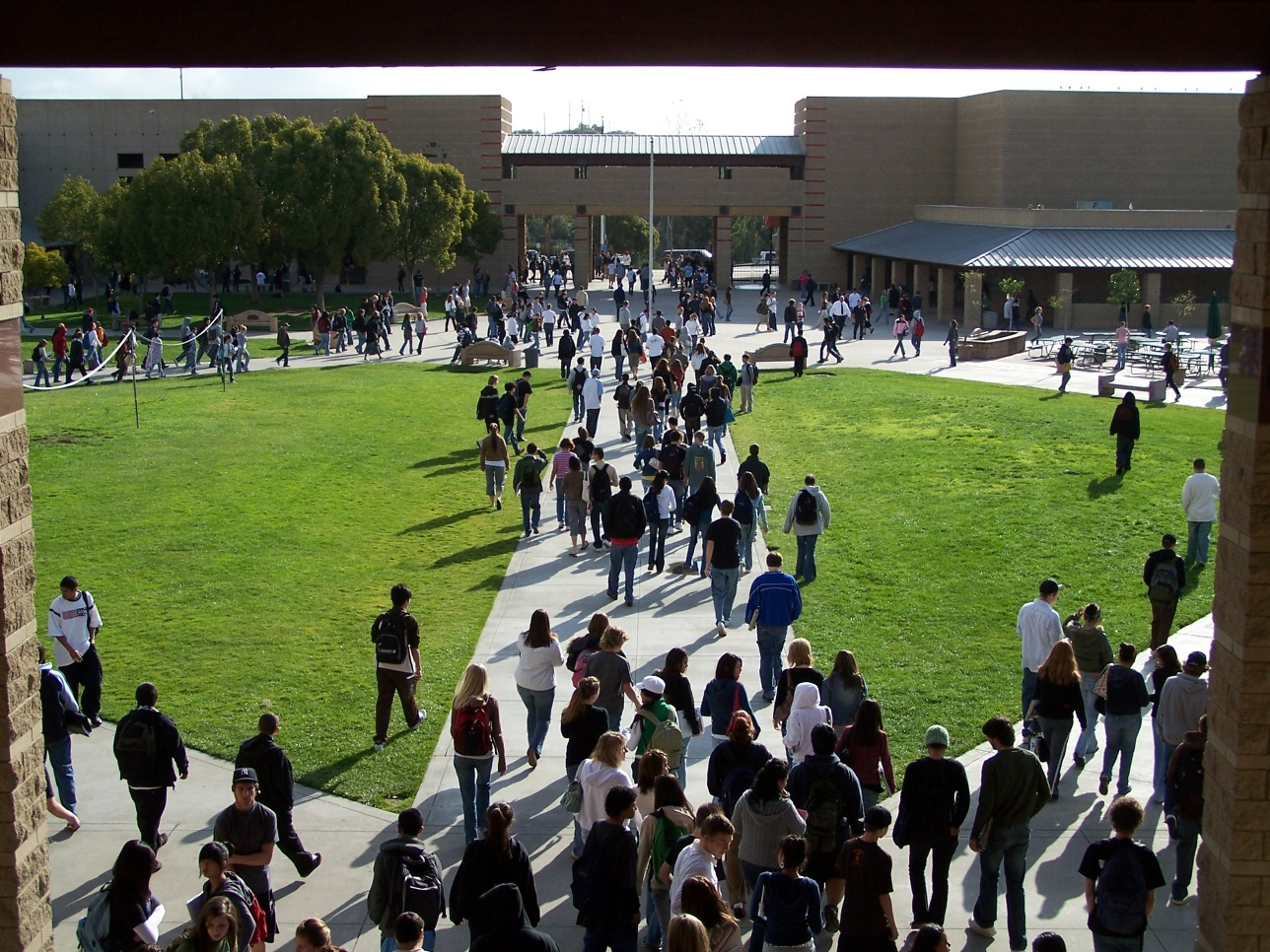
- Student activity on campus, during snack.

Location
- 789 Wildcat Way; Brea, California 92821; United States; 33°56′00″N 117°52′33″W

Information
- Type: Public 4-year
- Established: 1927
- School district: Brea Olinda Unified School District
- Principal: Joey Davis
- Teaching staff: 78.51 (FTE)
- Enrollment: 1,710 (2023-2024)
- Student to teacher ratio: 21.78
- Colors: Gold and Green
- Athletics conference: Century League
- Mascot: Wildcat
- Yearbook: The Gusher
- Website: bohs.bousd.us

Brea Olinda High School is a 9th–12th grade public high school located in Brea, California. Established in 1927, the school was originally located across East Birch Street from the Brea Mall. In 1989, the school moved to its current location on the northern hills of Brea. Brea Olinda High School is a part of the Brea Olinda Unified School District.

== History ==
Plans were made in 1924 to make a separate high school in Brea; some parents pushed back and insisted that their children remain at Fullerton Union High School. Construction commenced in 1926; despite some shortcomings by the original contractor, the $400,000 project was finished in time for the 1927–1928 school year. The school's initial enrollment was approximately 200 students and at the original location the school had a working farm as part of Future Farmers of America (FFA).

By 1989, the school population had grown and the high school needed major renovations. The school district decided to construct the new Brea Olinda High School at 789 Wildcat Way, and it opened in September 1989. The new school location would not include a working farm as part of Future Farmers of America (FFA).

== Athletics ==
BOHS football teams won CIF championships from 1959 to 1962, and again in 2018. The girls basketball team has won ten CIF State Championships.

== Performing arts ==
Brea Olinda fields four competitive show choirs: the mixed-gender "Masquerade", the all-female "Spellbound" and "Tiffanys", and the all-male "Thundercats". The program hosts an annual competition, the California Classic.

== Notable alumni ==
- James Cameron, filmmaker and explorer
- Travis Denker, former MLB player (San Francisco Giants)
- Kyle Fogg, professional basketball player
- Tommy Gallarda, professional football player
- Eva Gutowski, actress and Internet personality
- James Hetfield, musician
- Gary Holman, former MLB player (Washington Senators)
- Randy Jones, professional baseball player (San Diego Padres, New York Mets)
- Evan Moore, professional football player
- Jeanette Pohlen, professional basketball player
- Mark Rober, YouTuber, engineer, inventor, and educator
