= Chino Hills State Park =

State park in Southern California, United States

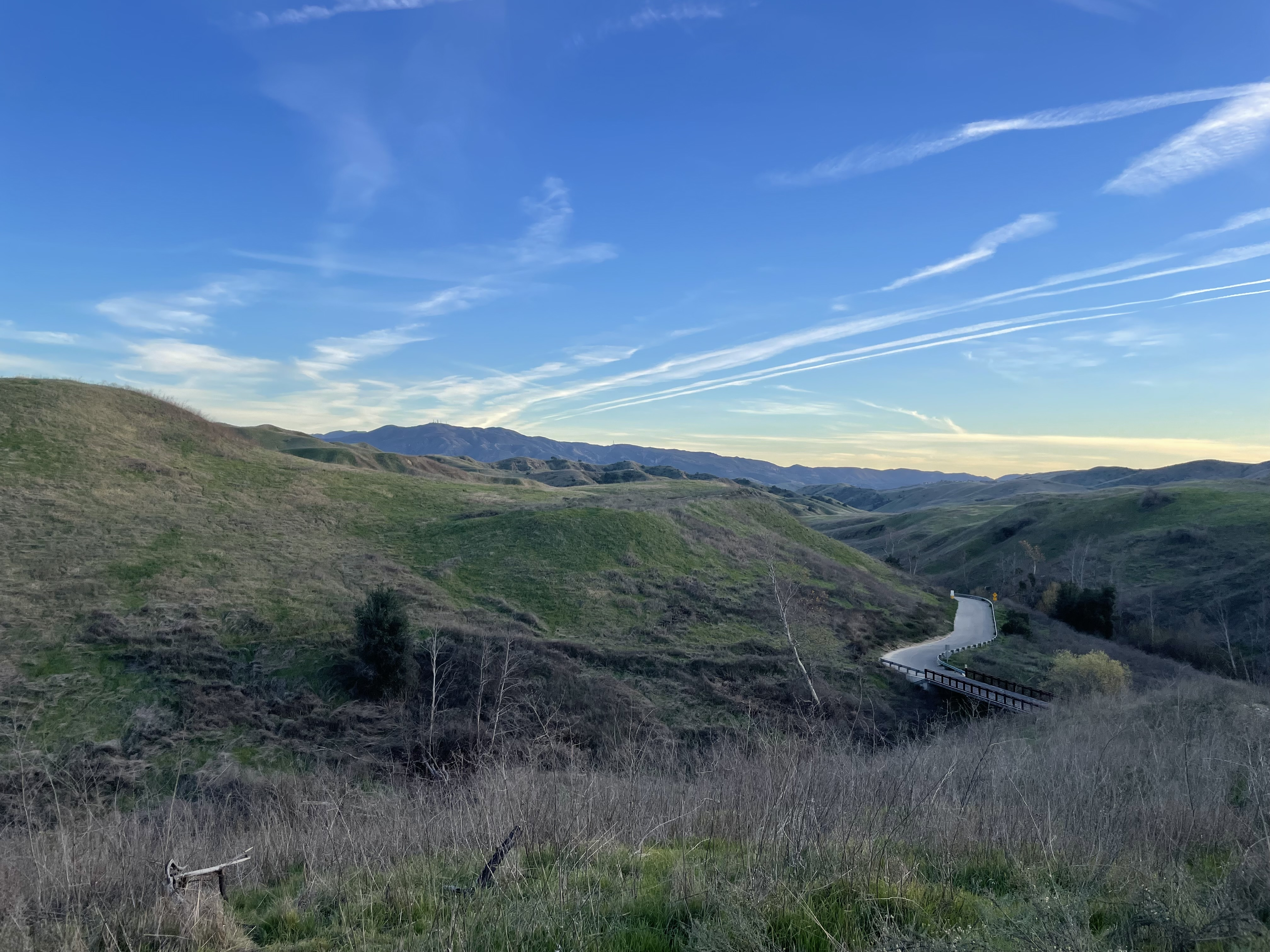
- Bane Canyon on the east side of the park.

- Location within the Los Angeles metropolitan area Location within California Location within the United States
- Interactive map of Chino Hills State Park
- Location: Orange, Riverside, and San Bernardino Counties, California, United States
- Nearest city: Chino Hills, California
- Coordinates: 33°57′16″N 117°42′7″W
- Area: 14,102 acres (57.07 km^{2})
- Established: 1981
- Governing body: California Department of Parks and Recreation

Chino Hills State Park is a state park of California, in the United States. It is located in the Chino Hills, foothills of the Santa Ana Mountains. It is a critical link in the Chino–Puente Hills wildlife corridor, and a major botanical habitat reserve for resident and migrating wildlife.

Visitors can walk, horseback ride, or mountain bike on trails through valleys and along ridge tops through woodlands, sage scrub and grasslands. 60 miles (100 km) of trails and fire roads also offer opportunities for viewing wildlife and native plants. Facilities consist of a picnic area, camping sites, equestrian staging area and corrals, a historic barn, water and restrooms. Most of the trails are multiple mode use. A few trails are designated for hiking only for safety or habitat protection.

== Geography ==
Chino Hills Park's 14,102 acres (57.07 km^{2}; 22.03 sq mi) encompass stands of oaks, sycamores and rolling, grassy hills that stretch nearly 31 miles (50 km), from the Santa Ana Mountains to the Whittier Hills encompassing the Puente Hills. Chino Hills is vitally important as a refuge to many species of California native plants, and as a link between natural habitat areas essential to the survival of many animal species. The park is located near the intersection of Orange, Riverside, and San Bernardino Counties.

The park is located 10 miles (16 km) northwest of Corona, and lies almost entirely in the city of Chino Hills in the southwest corner of San Bernardino County. Small parts of it spill over into Yorba Linda in northeastern Orange County, and into extreme western Riverside County, near Corona. The park has four main entrances with many other auxiliary entrances scattered throughout. The primary entrances are located in Chino Hills, Corona, Yorba Linda, and Brea. The Chino Hills entrance (also known as the north entrance) is located off of Sapphire road in northern Chino Hills. The Yorba Linda entrance is located off of Rim Crest drive in Yorba Linda. The Corona entrance is an offshoot from the Green River golf course in western Corona. The Brea entrance, also known as the Discovery Center, is located off of Carbon Canyon road in Eastern Brea, California.

== Flora ==
The Chino Hills are in the California chaparral and woodlands ecoregion of the California Floristic Province. The native plants here are in the chaparral and oak woodland plant communities, with remnant stands of native grasses of California. The predominant native trees are coast live oak (Quercus agrifolia), California black walnut (Juglans californica), and California sycamore (Platanus racemosa).

== History ==
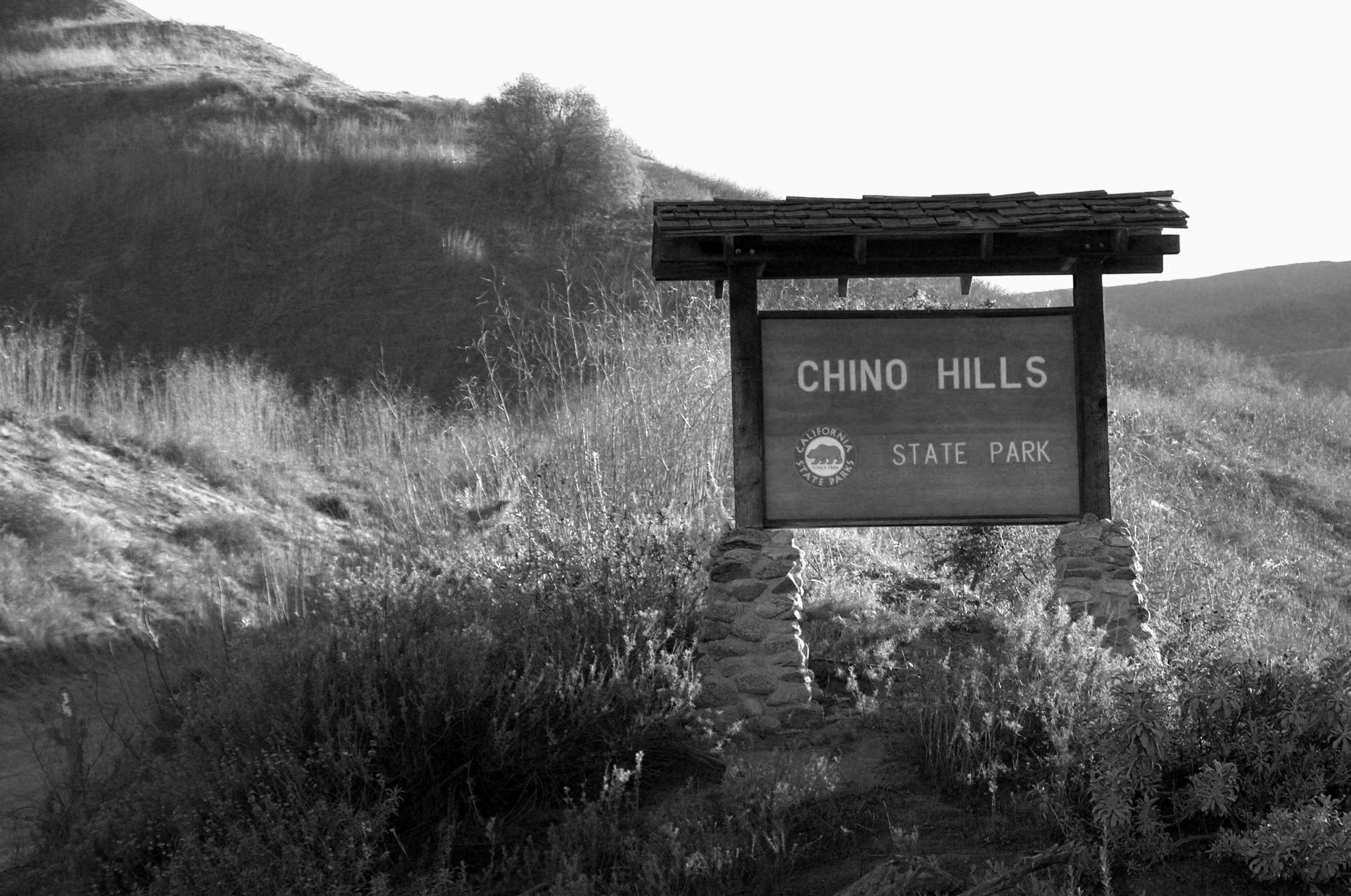
Welcome sign for the park

Over the centuries, many people have made use of the open spaces and plentiful water, plant and animal resources of the Chino Hills. Prior to European contact, the Tongva-Gabrieliño Indians, who lived in settlements along the Santa Ana River basin for 8,000 years, set up temporary camps in the hills for gathering acorns, elderberries, walnuts and other seeds.

After the Spanish founded Mission San Gabriel in 1771, the Chino Hills were used extensively for grazing by mission cattle. During the Mexican Republic era, the hills were used as spillover grazing from such surrounding Mexican ranchos as Santa Ana del Chino and La Sierra Yorba. The United States then conquered the territory in 1848 following the Mexican-American War. After this conquest, the land was still used primarily for grazing.

Private land acquisition began in the 1870s and continued into the 1890s. In 1848, the 1,720-acre (700 ha) Rolling M Ranch was established and the land leased to nearby landowners for cattle grazing. Some late nineteenth and early twentieth century oil exploration and mining activity also took place in the northwestern section of what is now the park. A ranch house, barn, and several windmills and watering troughs serve as reminders of the cattle ranching days.

=== Park founding ===
In 1977 the California legislature passed a resolution directing California State Parks to conduct a study on acquiring Chino Hills land for park purposes. A local citizen group, Hills for Everyone, worked closely with California State Parks and the legislature to create the park with an initial acquisition of 2,237 acres (905 ha). In 1984, the State Park and Recreation Commission officially declared the area a unit of the State Park System. Since that date, Chino Hills State Park has been expanded by numerous land acquisitions from various private landowners. Current documentation gives the park an area of 14,173 acres (5,736 ha) and an establishment date of 1981.

== See also ==
- Chino Hills, California
- List of California state parks
