= Brea, California =

City in California, United States

- City
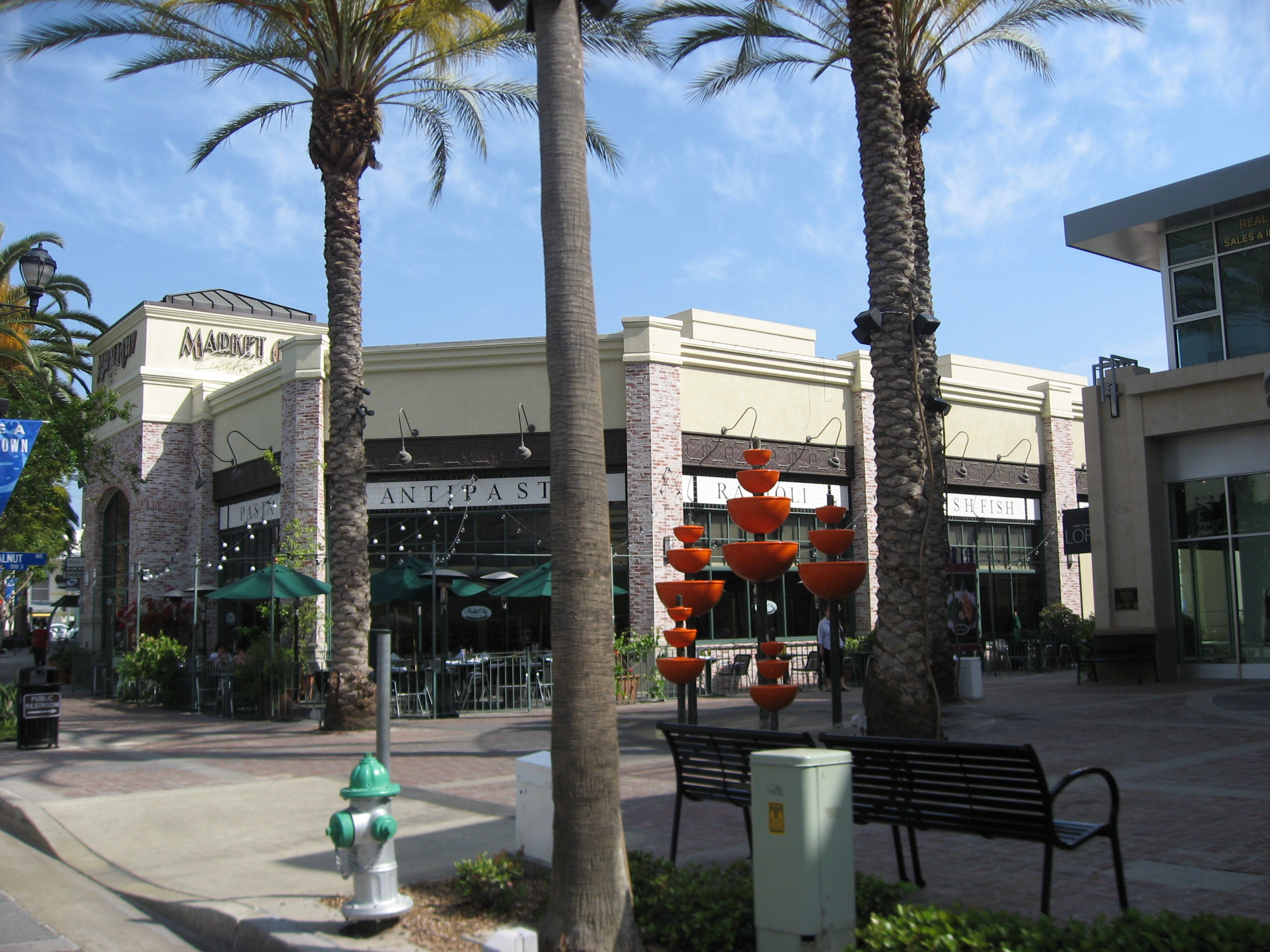
- Market City Cafe in Brea downtown

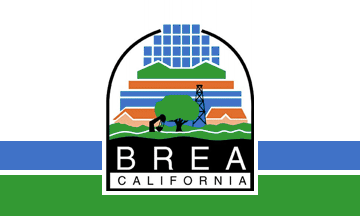
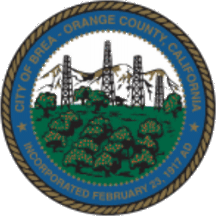
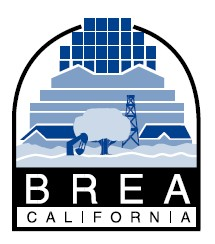
- Flag Seal Logo
- Interactive map of Brea, California
- Location in California Location within the United States Location within North America
- Coordinates: 33°55′24″N 117°53′20″W
- Country: United States
- State: California
- County: Orange
- Incorporated: February 23, 1917
- Named for: Spanish for "natural asphalt" or "tar"

Government
  - Type: Council-Manager
  - Mayor: Blair Stewart
  - City Council: Cecilia Hupp; Christine Marick; Marty Simonoff; Steven Vargas
  - City treasurer: Rick Rios
  - City manager: Kristin Griffith

Area
  - Total: 12.20 sq mi (31.61 km^{2})
  - Land: 12.17 sq mi (31.51 km^{2})
  - Water: 0.039 sq mi (0.10 km^{2}) 0.26%
- Elevation: 360 ft (110 m)

Population (2020)
  - Total: 47,325
  - Density: 3,889.4/sq mi (1,501.72/km^{2})
- Time zone: UTC−8 (PST)
  - Summer (DST): UTC−7 (PDT)
- ZIP codes: 92821–92823
- Area codes: 657/714, 562
- FIPS code: 06-08100
- GNIS feature IDs: 1660373, 2409897
- Website: cityofbrea.gov

Brea (/ˈbreɪə/ BRAY-uh; Spanish for 'tar') is a city in north Orange County, California, United States. The population as of the 2020 census was 47,325. It is 25 miles (40 km) southeast of Los Angeles. Brea is part of the Los Angeles metropolitan area.

The city began as a center of crude oil production and was later propelled by citrus production. It is a significant retail center, including the Carbon Canyon Dam, Carbon Canyon Regional Park, Brea Mall and downtown Brea. The city has an extensive public art program that began in 1975 and has over 140 artworks placed throughout the city.

== History ==
=== Indigenous ===
The area began as part of the homelands of the Tongva, who lived in the area for thousands of years before any contact was made with Europeans. The Tongva established extensive routes for travel and trade between Tongva villages as well as with neighboring Indigenous nations. The closest known village site to the city of Brea today is Hutuknga.

=== Spanish era ===
The area was visited on July 29, 1769, by the Spanish Portolá expedition, the first Europeans to see inland parts of Alta California. The party camped in Brea Canyon, near a large native village and a small pool of clean water.

Oil fields of the Brea area, early 1900s

The village of Olinda was founded in present-day Carbon Canyon at the beginning of the 19th century. Many entrepreneurs came to the area searching for "black gold" (petroleum).

=== Mexican era ===
The majority of the current city borders of Brea were within the Rancho San Juan Cajon de Santa Ana. The cessation of territory to the United States in 1848 ushered in a new era of decline for the ranchos as rigorous title-proving processes enacted in 1851 and drought in 1860 caused most owners to sell their land.

=== American era ===
The 1880s saw the development of agriculture in northern Orange County, particularly in the form of Valencia Oranges after it was found that the crop grew better in the cool foothills. Additionally, the construction of the Santa Fe Railroad as well as the discovery of oil in the area created an environment that kept winter frost from damaging the plant. Nearby oil fields provided supply for a process called "smudging", subsequently causing a grimy fog to settle over the area which reportedly caused health issues for the workers.

In 1894, the owner of the land, Abel Stearns, sold 1,200 acres (4.9 km^{2}) west of Olinda to the newly created Union Oil Company of California, and by 1898 many nearby hills began sporting wooden oil drilling towers on the newly discovered Brea-Olinda Oil Field. In 1908 the village of Randolph, named for railway engineer Epes Randolph, was founded just south of Brea Canyon for oil workers and their families. Baseball legend Walter Johnson grew up in Olinda at the start of the 20th century, working in the surrounding oil fields.

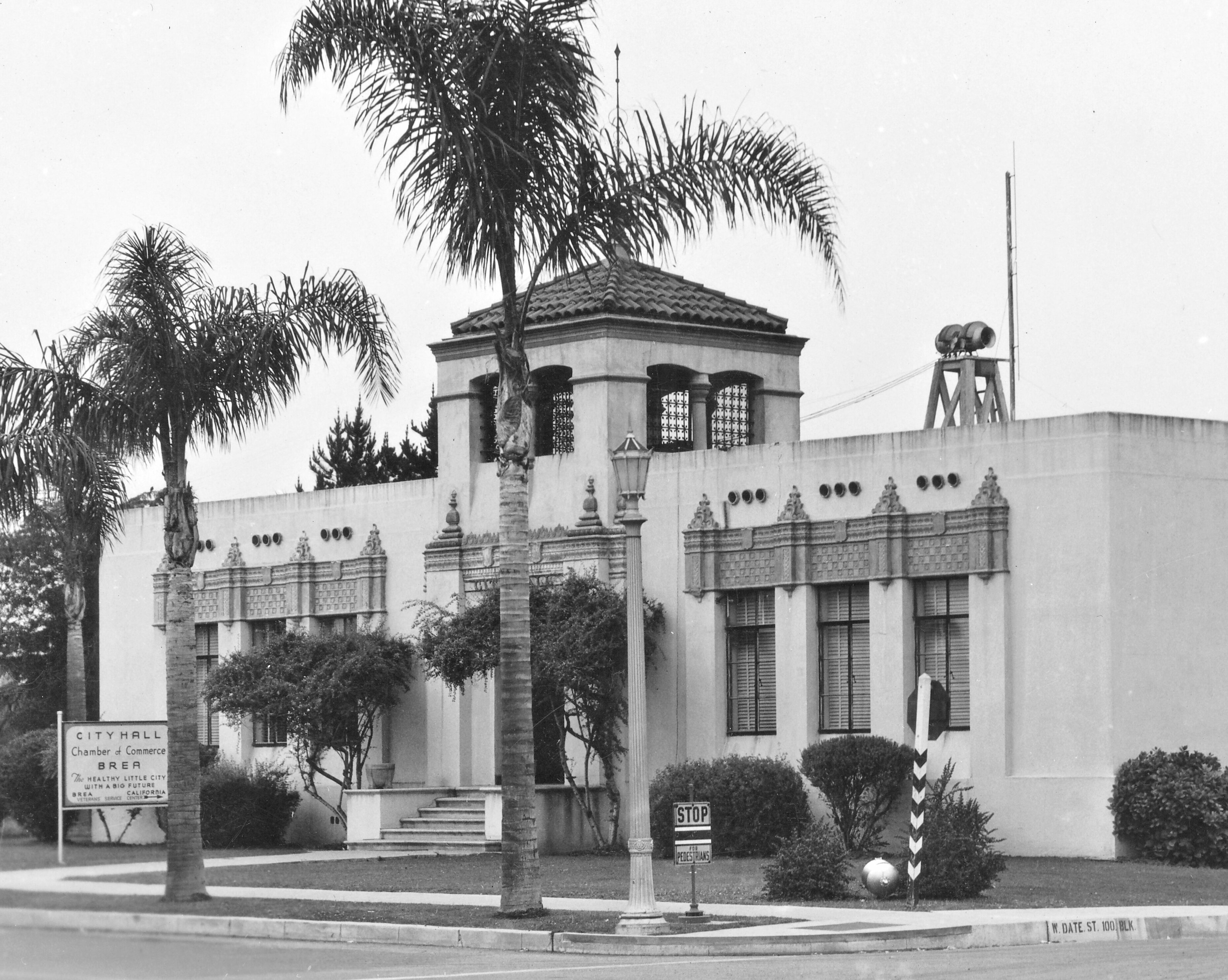
The Spanish Colonial Revival-style former Brea City Hall in the 1940s.

Olinda and Randolph grew and merged as the economy boomed. On January 19, 1911, the town's map was filed under the new name of Brea, from the Spanish language word for natural asphalt, also called bitumen, pitch, or tar. With a population of 752, Brea was incorporated on February 23, 1917, as the eighth official city of Orange County.

As oil production declined, some agricultural development took place, especially lemon and orange groves. In the 1920s, the Brea Chamber of Commerce promoted the city with the slogan “Oil, Oranges, and Opportunity.”

In 1950, Brea had a population of 3,208, 641 more than ten years earlier. The citrus groves gave way gradually to industrial parks and residential development. In 1956, Carl N. Karcher opened the first two Carl's Jr. restaurants in Anaheim and Brea. The opening of the Orange Freeway (57) and the Brea Mall in the 1970s spurred further residential growth, including large planned developments east of the 57 Freeway in the 1980s, 1990s, and 2000s.

In the late 1990s, a 50-acre (200,000 m^{2}) swath of downtown Brea centered on Brea Boulevard and Birch Street was redeveloped into a shopping and entertainment area with movie theaters, sidewalk cafes, a live comedy club from The Improv chain, numerous shops and restaurants, and a weekly farmer's market. It is locally known and signed as Downtown Brea. The downtown area opened in 2000.

== Geography ==
According to the United States Census Bureau, the city has an area of 12.1 square miles (31 km^{2}). 12.1 square miles (31 km^{2}) of it is land and 0.26% is water.

It is bordered by unincorporated Orange County and Los Angeles County to the north and east, La Habra to the west, Fullerton to the southwest, Placentia to the south, Chino Hills to the northwest, and Yorba Linda to the southeast.

=== Climate ===
According to the Köppen Climate Classification system, Brea has a hot-summer Mediterranean climate, abbreviated "Csa" on climate maps.

Climate data for Brea, California
Month	Jan	Feb	Mar	Apr	May	Jun	Jul	Aug	Sep	Oct	Nov	Dec	Year
Mean daily maximum °C (°F)	21 (69)	21 (70)	22 (72)	23 (74)	24 (76)	27 (80)	29 (85)	30 (86)	30 (86)	27 (81)	24 (75)	21 (69)	25 (77)
Mean daily minimum °C (°F)	8 (47)	9 (48)	10 (50)	11 (52)	14 (57)	16 (60)	18 (64)	18 (64)	17 (62)	14 (57)	11 (51)	8 (46)	13 (55)
Average precipitation mm (inches)	64 (2.5)	79 (3.1)	69 (2.7)	28 (1.1)	5.1 (0.2)	0 (0)	0 (0)	10 (0.4)	7.6 (0.3)	7.6 (0.3)	30 (1.2)	61 (2.4)	361.3 (14.2)

== Demographics ==
Historical population
Census	Pop.	Note	%±
1920	1,037		—
1930	2,435		134.8%
1940	2,567		5.4%
1950	3,208		25.0%
1960	8,487		164.6%
1970	18,447		117.4%
1980	27,913		51.3%
1990	32,873		17.8%
2000	35,410		7.7%
2010	39,282		10.9%
2020	47,325		20.5%
U.S. Decennial Census; 1860–1870 1880-1890; 1900 1910 1920; 1930 1940 1950; 1960 1970 1980; 1990 2000 2010; 2020

Brea first appeared as a city in the 1920 U.S. census as part of Brea Township.

=== Racial and ethnic composition ===
Brea city, California – Racial and ethnic composition Note: the US Census treats Hispanic/Latino as an ethnic category. This table excludes Latinos from the racial categories and assigns them to a separate category. Hispanics/Latinos may be of any race.
Race / Ethnicity (NH = Non-Hispanic)	Pop 1980	Pop 1990	Pop 2000	Pop 2010	Pop 2020	% 1980	% 1990	% 2000	% 2010	% 2020
White alone (NH)	23,668	25,359	23,541	20,690	18,256	84.73%	77.14%	66.48%	52.67%	38.58%
Black or African American alone (NH)	56	332	409	499	784	0.20%	1.01%	1.16%	1.27%	1.66%
Native American or Alaska Native alone (NH)	276	115	111	90	101	0.99%	0.35%	0.31%	0.23%	0.21%
Asian alone (NH)	638	1,957	3,184	7,068	13,082	2.28%	5.95%	8.99%	17.99%	27.64%
Native Hawaiian or Pacific Islander alone (NH)	638	1,957	71	62	54	2.28%	5.95%	0.20%	0.16%	0.11%
Other race alone (NH)	26	32	57	82	230	0.09%	0.10%	0.16%	0.21%	0.49%
Mixed race or Multiracial (NH)	x	x	832	974	1,846	x	x	2.35%	2.48%	3.90%
Hispanic or Latino (any race)	2,547	5,078	7,205	9,817	12,972	9.12%	15.45%	20.35%	24.99%	27.41%
Total	27,913	32,873	35,410	39,282	47,325	100.00%	100.00%	100.00%	100.00%	100.00%

=== 2020 census ===
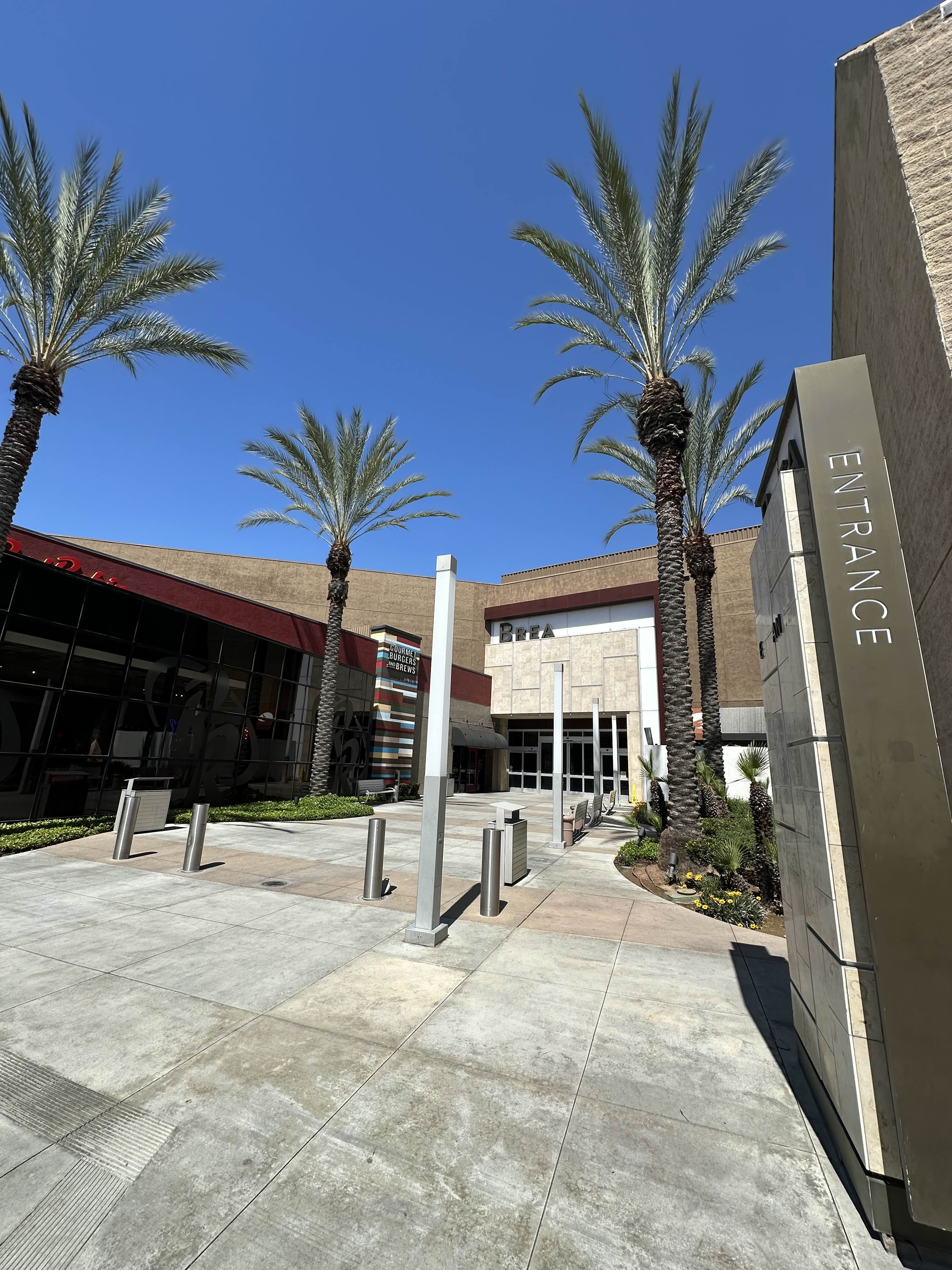
Entrance to the Brea Mall

As of the 2020 census, Brea had a population of 47,325 and a population density of 3,889.3 inhabitants per square mile (1,501.7/km^{2}). The population was 21.2% under the age of 18, 8.2% aged 18 to 24, 27.5% aged 25 to 44, 26.6% aged 45 to 64, and 16.5% who were 65 years of age or older; the median age was 40.1 years. For every 100 females, there were 93.3 males, and for every 100 females age 18 and over there were 90.4 males age 18 and over.

Of residents, 97.9% lived in urban areas and 2.1% lived in rural areas. The census reported that 99.4% of the population lived in households, 0.3% lived in non-institutionalized group quarters, and 0.2% were institutionalized.

There were 17,069 households, of which 33.4% had children under the age of 18 living in them. Of all households, 56.6% were married-couple households, 5.3% were cohabiting couple households, 24.1% had a female householder with no partner present, and 14.0% had a male householder with no partner present. About 20.4% of all households were made up of individuals and 9.5% had someone living alone who was 65 years of age or older. The average household size was 2.76. There were 12,553 families (73.5% of all households).

There were 17,881 housing units, of which 95.5% were occupied. Of these, 61.5% were owner-occupied and 38.5% were occupied by renters. The homeowner vacancy rate was 0.6% and the rental vacancy rate was 4.3%.

Racial composition as of the 2020 census
Race	Number	Percent
White	21,332	45.1%
Black or African American	850	1.8%
American Indian and Alaska Native	376	0.8%
Asian	13,236	28.0%
Native Hawaiian and Other Pacific Islander	71	0.2%
Some other race	4,851	10.3%
Two or more races	6,609	14.0%
Hispanic or Latino (of any race)	12,972	27.4%

=== Income ===
In 2023, the US Census Bureau estimated that the median household income was $124,837, and the per capita income was $53,128. About 4.5% of families and 6.4% of the population were below the poverty line.

=== 2010 census ===
The 2010 United States census reported that Brea had a population of 39,282. The population density was 3,243.9 inhabitants per square mile (1,252.5/km^{2}). The racial makeup of Brea was 26,363 (67.1%) White (52.7% Non-Hispanic White), 549 (1.4%) African American, 190 (0.5%) Native American, 7,144 (18.2%) Asian, 69 (0.2%) Pacific Islander, 3,236 (8.2%) from other races, and 1,731 (4.4%) from two or more races. Hispanic or Latino of any race were 9,817 persons (25.0%).

The census reported that 39,213 people (99.8% of the population) lived in households, 69 (0.2%) lived in non-institutionalized group quarters, and 0 (0%) were institutionalized.

There were 14,266 households, out of which 5,043 (35.3%) had children under the age of 18 living in them, 8,132 (57.0%) were opposite-sex married couples living together, 1,605 (11.3%) had a female householder with no husband present, 632 (4.4%) had a male householder with no wife present. There were 569 (4.0%) unmarried opposite-sex partnerships, and 100 (0.7%) same-sex married couples or partnerships. 3,070 households (21.5%) were made up of individuals, and 1,265 (8.9%) had someone living alone who was 65 years of age or older. The average household size was 2.75. There were 10,369 families (72.7% of all households); the average family size was 3.23.

The population was spread out, with 9,057 people (23.1%) under the age of 18, 3,654 people (9.3%) aged 18 to 24, 10,669 people (27.2%) aged 25 to 44, 10,952 people (27.9%) aged 45 to 64, and 4,950 people (12.6%) who were 65 years of age or older. The median age was 38.7 years. For every 100 females, there were 95.2 males. For every 100 females age 18 and over, there were 91.9 males.

There were 14,785 housing units at an average density of 1,221.0 units per square mile (471.4 units/km^{2}), of which 9,266 (65.0%) were owner-occupied, and 5,000 (35.0%) were occupied by renters. The homeowner vacancy rate was 1.3%; the rental vacancy rate was 5.3%. 26,889 people (68.5% of the population) lived in owner-occupied housing units and 12,324 people (31.4%) lived in rental housing units.

According to the 2010 United States census, Brea had a median household income of $82,055, with 5.6% of the population living below the federal poverty line.

== Government ==
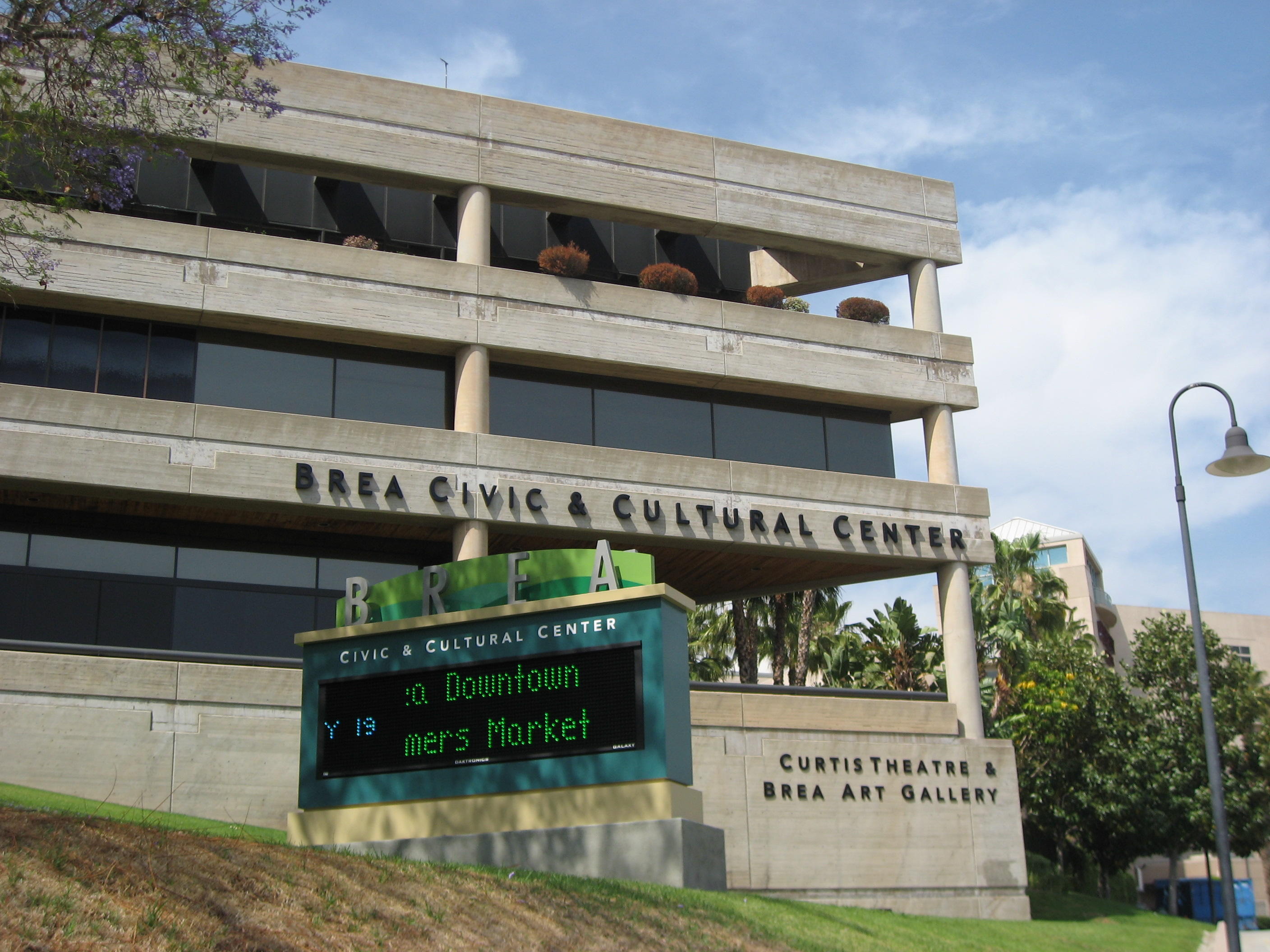
Brea City Hall, Civic and Cultural Center

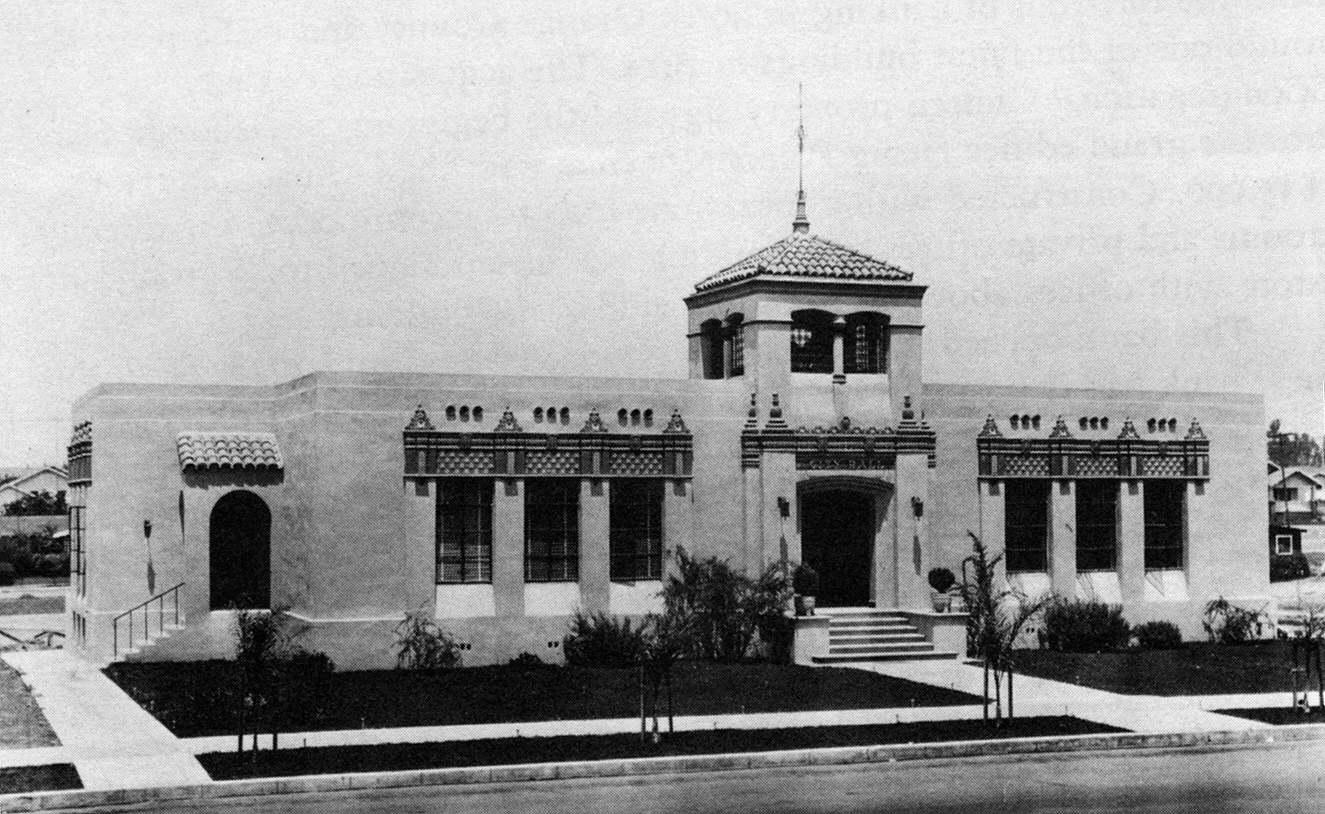
The old Brea City Hall in the 1940s

=== Local ===
Brea is governed by a council-manager system. The five-member city council is elected to four-year terms in elections held every two years to fill alternately two and three seats. The council is made up of the mayor, the mayor pro tem and three councilmembers. The council elects a mayor from the serving councilmembers to serve a one-year term as mayor. The city council hires a city manager to direct the city's departments and advise the council. The council appoints members of the Planning Commission; Parks, Recreation and Human Services Commission; Cultural Arts Commission, and Traffic Committee.

=== Federal, State, and County Representation ===
In the United States House of Representatives, Brea is split between California's 45th congressional district, represented by Democrat Derek Tran, and California's 40th congressional district, represented by Republican Young Kim.

In the California State Assembly, Brea resides within the 59th Assembly District, represented by Republican Phillip Chen.

In the California State Senate, Brea is split between two districts

- The 30th Senatorial District, represented by Democrat Bob Archuleta.
- The 32nd Senatorial District, represented by Republican Kelly Seyarto.

In the Orange County Board of Supervisors, Brea resides within the 4th District represented by Doug Chaffee.

=== Politics ===
Brea is traditionally a Republican stronghold at the presidential level, Democratic nominee Joe Biden carried the city in 2020. According to the Orange County Registrar of Voters, as of May 14, 2025, Brea has 30,626 registered voters. Of those, 9,991 (40.33%) are registered Republicans, 7,370 (29.75%) are registered Democrats, and 6,466 (26.10%) have declined to state a political party or are independents.

=== Crime ===
The Uniform Crime Report (UCR), collected annually by the FBI, compiles police statistics from local and state law enforcement agencies across the nation. The UCR records Part I and Part II crimes. Part I crimes become known to law enforcement and are considered the most serious crimes including homicide, rape, robbery, aggravated assault, burglary, larceny, motor vehicle theft, and arson. Part II crimes only include arrest data. The 2023 UCR Data for Brea is listed below:

2023 UCR Data
	Aggravated Assault	Homicide	Rape	Robbery	Burglary	Larceny Theft	Motor Vehicle Theft	Arson
Brea	51	1	11	44	174	1,223	99	2

Brea city vote by party in presidential elections
Year	Democratic	Republican	Third Parties
2020	50.52% 12,801	47.54% 12,046	1.95% 493
2016	44.55% 8,724	48.17% 9,432	7.28% 1,426
2012	39.66% 7,197	57.89% 10,504	2.45% 444
2008	41.70% 7,625	56.26% 10,287	2.05% 374
2004	33.35% 5,722	65.56% 11,248	1.08% 186
2000	34.59% 5,408	61.71% 9,649	3.70% 579
1996	34.70% 4,931	55.40% 7,872	9.90% 1,407
1992	28.91% 4,686	48.09% 7,796	23.00% 3,728
1988	27.82% 4,061	71.06% 10,372	1.12% 164
1984	21.26% 2,976	77.96% 10,913	0.79% 110
1980	20.79% 2,660	71.03% 9,088	8.18% 1,046
1976	33.24% 2,983	65.24% 5,855	1.48% 133

== Economy ==
=== Top employers ===
According to the city's 2023 Annual Comprehensive Financial Report, the city's top employers are:

#	Employer	# of employees
1	Albertsons	1,206
2	Beckman Coulter	837
3	Brea Olinda Unified School District	621
4	Nationwide	460
5	Service Champions Plumbing, HVAC	406
6	Bristol Industries	405
7	Nordstrom	250
8	24 Hour Fitness	201
9	Acosta Sales & Marketing	163
10	The Olive Garden	122

== Education ==
Brea is primarily served by the Brea Olinda Unified School District, which operates six elementary schools, one junior high school (Brea Junior High School), one high school (Brea Olinda High School), and one continuation high school (Brea Canyon High School).

== Infrastructure ==
Transportation

The Orange County Transportation Authority (OCTA) operates four local bus routes servicing 68 stops within Brea. Foothill Transit Route 286 terminates at Brea Mall.

City Services

Fire protection for Brea is provided by the Brea Fire Department, and law enforcement is provided by the Brea Police Department. Within Carbon Canyon, in the Olinda neighborhood of Brea, is the Olinda Landfill, a waste management facility serving Orange County.

=== Health Care ===
Brea is serviced by very few medical facilities:

- Kindred Hospital Brea (Long-term acute care)
- Brea Urgent Care (Urgent Care)

=== Water Services ===
Water in Brea is supplied by the City of Brea Utilities Water Division, which sources its water from the Metropolitan Water District of Southern California, importing water from the Colorado River and the State Water Project, drawing from the Sacramento-San Joaquin River Delta. Additionally, Cal Domestic in Whitter imports groundwater from the Main San Gabriel groundwater basin.

== Registered Historic Places ==
- Brea City Hall and Park

== Notable people ==
- Stephanie J. Block, Broadway actress/singer
- James Cameron, film director/producer/screenwriter
- JoAnn Dean Killingsworth, actress & dancer, first person to play Snow White at Disneyland
- Travis Denker, Major League baseball player (San Francisco Giants)
- Cody Fajardo, quarterback for the Edmonton Elks
- Kyle Fogg, professional basketball player
- Tommy Gallarda, pro football player (Atlanta Falcons)
- James Hetfield, musician (Metallica)
- Walter Johnson, Major League baseball pitcher for the Washington Senators
- Randy Jones, Major League baseball player (San Diego Padres)
- Joe Maddon, Major League baseball manager (Chicago Cubs)
- Alli Mauzey, Broadway actress/singer
- Evan Moore, pro football player (Green Bay Packers)
- Jeanette Pohlen, Women's National Basketball Association player (Indiana Fever)
- Cruz Reynoso, jurist
- Mark Rober, YouTuber and former NASA and Apple engineer
- Ken Spears, animator & co-founder of Ruby-Spears Productions
- Caroline Zhang, figure skater
- Nikki Ziering, model and actress
- Norma Zimmer, singer

== Sister cities ==
Brea is twinned with:

- Anseong, South Korea (2011)
- Hannō, Japan (1980)
- Lagos de Moreno, Mexico (1969)
