= Egyptian Building (disambiguation) =

Egyptian Building may refer to:

- Egyptian Building, a historic college building in Richmond, Virginia
- Egyptian Building (California), an attraction in Chino Hills, California
- Egyptian Building (Cape Town), the location of Michaelis School of Fine Art in Cape Town, South Africa
