= John Houser (American football) =

American football player (born 1935)

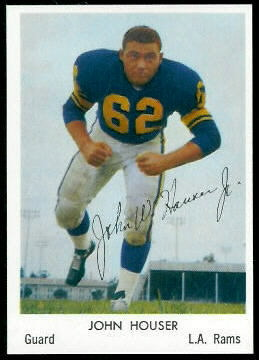
- Houser in 1959

No. 62, 67, 66
- Position: Guard / Center

Personal information
- Born: June 21, 1935 (age 91); Oklahoma City, Oklahoma, U.S.
- Listed height: 6 ft 3 in (1.91 m)
- Listed weight: 238 lb (108 kg)

Career information
- High school: Boys Republic (Chino Hills, California)
- College: Redlands
- NFL draft: 1957: undrafted

Career history
- Los Angeles Rams (1957–1959); Dallas Cowboys (1960–1962); St. Louis Cardinals (1963)

Career NFL statistics
- Games played: 68
- Stats at Pro Football Reference

John Wesley "Joe" Houser Jr. (born June 21, 1935) is an American former professional football player who was an offensive lineman in the National Football League (NFL) for the Los Angeles Rams, Dallas Cowboys, and St. Louis Cardinals. He played college football for the Redlands Bulldogs.

== Early life ==
Houser attended Boys Republic High School, before moving on to the University of Redlands. In college, he played end, tackle, center, fullback, and was the team's placekicker.

He was a part of the 1956 Bulldog's 9-0-0 team, which defeated Occidental College 28–0 with Jack Kemp at quarterback, and Whittier College in the last collegiate game coached by George Allen before moving to the NFL.

== Professional career ==
=== Los Angeles Rams ===
Houser was signed as an undrafted free agent by the Los Angeles Rams after the 1957 NFL draft. He was named the starter at offensive guard as a rookie.

In 1958, he served a six months military service. He was mostly a backup that played the guard and center position. On September 6, 1960, he was traded to the Dallas Cowboys in exchange for a 1962 seventh round draft choice (#88-Jim Bakken).

=== Dallas Cowboys ===
In 1960, he became the first starter at center in Dallas Cowboys franchise history. The next year, he was moved to offensive guard and started 7 games.

In 1962, he missed the entire season with a serious knee injury that he suffered in the first preseason game against the Green Bay Packers. He was waived on September 10, 1963.

=== St. Louis Cardinals ===
In 1963, he played for the St. Louis Cardinals. He announced his retirement on May 19, 1964.

== Personal life ==
Houser married Mary Alison Hortie.
