= Los Serranos, Chino Hills, California =

Los Serranos
- Neighborhood
- Location within California
- Coordinates: 33°58′25″N 117°42′18″W
- Country: United States
- State: California
- County: San Bernardino
- City: Chino Hills

Area
  - Total: 2.7 sq mi (7.0 km^{2})
- Elevation: 653 ft (199 m)

Population (1990)
  - Total: 7,099
  - Density: 2,629.3/sq mi (1,015.2/km^{2})
- Time zone: UTC-8 (Pacific (PST))
  - Summer (DST): UTC-7 (PDT)
- ZIP code: 91709
- FIPS code: 06-44140

Los Serranos is a neighborhood within the city of Chino Hills in southwestern San Bernardino County, California. It is named after the Los Serranos Golf Course within the east-central portion of the Chino Hills city limits, near the Chino Valley Freeway (SR 71). The U.S. Census reported Los Serranos as a separate Census-designated place in the 1990 Census until it was incorporated into the city of Chino Hills on December 1, 1991. The area is known for its unique architectural legacy of narrow golf course bungalows with an average lot width of 30 feet, resulting from the subdivision's origin as a 1920s resort.

== Name ==
Los Serranos loosely means "the hill-dwellers" in Spanish. Various translations include "highlanders," "mountaineers," or "men of the hills." The area is also the homeland of the Serrano tribe of Native Americans, given that name by Spanish missionaries.

== Area ==
Los Serranos is a subdivision within the city of Chino Hills characterized by substandard lot sizes. It is further divided by locals into two sections known as "Upper" and "Lower" Los Serranos, with Ramona Avenue serving as the line of demarcation. The eastern "Lower" portion was historically subject to flooding, while the western "Upper" portion sits on higher ground. A third distinct community within the neighborhood is the mobile home park surrounding Lake Los Serranos (Dam Number 808).

== History ==
Prior to the 20th century, the area was inhabited by the Tongva and Serrano peoples, who maintained a trade network through the hills. The village of Pasinogna was likely located on the current site of the Los Serranos Country Club. Following the Spanish Mission era, the land became part of Rancho Santa Ana del Chino, used primarily for cattle grazing.

The modern community began in the early 1920s when the Davidson Investment Company purchased 750 acres of the "Home Ranch" property. The Los Serranos Golf and Country Club opened on April 25, 1925. During this era, the area was marketed as a resort where members could purchase small lots to build cabanas.

Following the Wall Street Crash of 1929, planned subdivisions stalled, leaving a legacy of narrow residential lots that are typically only 30 feet wide. In 1953, tennis legend Jack Kramer acquired the lease for the facility, becoming the sole owner in 1961.

The area received a massive population boom in the 1980s. In the 1990 United States census, Los Serranos was recorded as a separate Census-designated place for the first and only time before being officially incorporated into the city of Chino Hills on December 1, 1991.

== Infrastructure and redevelopment ==
Since its incorporation into Chino Hills, Los Serranos has undergone extensive modernization to address the lack of planning in the original 1920s subdivision. Since 2007, the city has invested over $20 million in the neighborhood for the installation of sidewalks, streetlights, and storm drains. In 2026, the city received $1,092,000 in federal community project funding for the Los Serranos Flood Protection Project, aimed at mitigating flooding for residential properties bounded by Fairway Boulevard and Yorba Avenue.

Major proposed developments include Rancho Cielito, a 48-acre project centered around the 19-acre Lake Los Serranos. The development plan proposes 354 multi-family residential units and a public boardwalk along the lake's edge.

== Parks and recreation ==
The neighborhood is served by several municipal parks:

- Los Serranos Park: A 6-acre park adjacent to Chaparral Elementary featuring a playground and outdoor fitness equipment.
- Rincon Park: A 6-acre facility to the south equipped with a basketball half-court and barbecue grills.
- Veterans Park: Located nearby, this park includes a veterans' memorial and a disc golf course.

The community is also situated near trailheads for the Chino Hills State Park network, including the Scully Ridge Trail, which provides over 90 miles of hiking and equestrian routes.

== Climate ==
Los Serranos experiences a Mediterranean climate (Köppen Csa), characterized by hot, dry summers and cool, wet winters. Due to its position at the base of the Chino Hills, the neighborhood often experiences a distinct microclimate; it can be several degrees cooler than the valley floor during summer evenings due to downslope breezes from the state park, while also being subject to higher wind speeds during Santa Ana wind events.

== Landmarks and historical sites ==
=== State Bird Farm ===
Historically, the California Department of Fish and Game established the Los Serranos State Bird Farm in the late 1920s on land formerly part of the Gird estate. At its peak, it was the largest bird-rearing facility in the state, producing thousands of pheasants and chukars annually for release. The facility closed in 1960, but its legacy remains in local street names such as Bird Farm Road.

=== Lake Los Serranos ===
Lake Los Serranos (officially Dam Number 808) is a 19-acre man-made reservoir located within the neighborhood. Originally constructed in the late 19th century by Richard Gird for agricultural irrigation, it now serves as the centerpiece for a private residential community and is a primary focus for future city-led park and boardwalk redevelopment plans.

== Geography ==
The neighborhood is situated in the east-central portion of Chino Hills at an approximate average elevation of 669 feet (204 m). A prominent local feature is Lake Los Serranos, a man-made reservoir created in the 1880s by Richard Gird.

The community is divided by Ramona Avenue into two distinct sections based on topography:

- Lower Los Serranos: The eastern portion of the neighborhood, which sits at a lower average elevation of approximately 650 feet (198 m). Historically, this area was prone to flooding due to its proximity to the Chino Creek drainage area.
- Upper Los Serranos: The western portion of the neighborhood, where the terrain begins to slope upward toward the foothills. Elevations in this section reach up to approximately 780 feet (238 m) near Pipeline Avenue and the border of the Chino Hills State Park.

== Notable residents ==
- Jack Kramer (1921–2009): World No. 1 tennis champion who acquired the Los Serranos Golf Club in 1953 and was its sole owner from 1961 until his death.
- David Kramer: Philanthropist and eldest son of Jack Kramer; named 2021 Chino Valley "Citizen of the Year" for his service with the YMCA and local community boards.
- Ruben S. Ayala (1922–2012): Former California State Senator and Chino mayor who was instrumental in establishing the flood control infrastructure for the lower Los Serranos area.

== Public safety ==
Due to its location at the urban-wildland interface of the Chino Hills State Park, Los Serranos is subject to wildfire monitoring through the AlertCalifornia program. The neighborhood is specifically monitored by the "Chino Hills Fixed North" webcam stream operated by the University of California, San Diego for early detection of fire threats. The city of Chino Hills maintains active emergency preparedness programs for the area, encouraging "defensible space" maintenance for properties adjacent to the hills.

== Religious sites ==
The neighborhood and its immediate surroundings are home to several significant religious landmarks:

- Wat Phrathat Doi Suthep USA: A Thai Buddhist temple located on Chino Hills Parkway. It is known for its traditional architecture and a popular Sunday open-air market that serves authentic Thai cuisine to the public.
- BAPS Shri Swaminarayan Mandir: Located just north of the neighborhood, this traditional Hindu temple is a major regional cultural landmark constructed of hand-carved Italian marble and Indian sandstone.

== Demographics ==
Historical population
Census	Pop.	Note	%±
1990	7,099		—
U.S. Decennial Census

=== 1990 ===
The 1990 United States census reported that Los Serranos had a population of 7,099. The racial makeup of Los Serranos was 69.8% White, 1.6% African American, 1.0% Native American, 4.1% Asian or Pacific Islander, and 23.5% from other races. Hispanic or Latino of any race were 50.1% of the population.

The census reported that 100% of the population lived in households. There were 2,060 households, out of which 53.1% included children under the age of 18, 68.6% were married-couple households, 11.4% had a female householder with no husband present, and 14.5% were non-families. 10.6% of households were one person, and 3.4% were one person aged 65 or older. The average household size was 3.44. There were 1,761 families (85.5% of all households).

The age distribution was 33.3% under the age of 18, 10.5% from 18 to 24, 36.0% from 25 to 44, 14.8% from 45 to 64, and 5.4% who were 65 years of age or older. The median age was 23.6 years. For every 100 females, there were 107.8 males.

There were 2,192 housing units, of which 2,060 (94.0%) were occupied. Of these, 64.8% were owner-occupied, and 35.2% were occupied by renters. The median household income was $35,160. About 10.9% of families and 13.5% of the population were below the poverty line.

== Education ==
There are 2 schools located within Los Serranos—the Alternative Education Center and Chaparral Elementary School. The Alternative Education Center occupies the site of the former Los Serranos Elementary School, which closed following the 2008-2009 academic year. Located on the west end of Los Serranos at 15650 Pipeline Avenue, this site is "technically" located in the Chino Hills community of Glenmeade but as it faces the Los Serranos area and typically serves students from Los Serranos, it has locally been considered part of Los Serranos. The Alternative Education Center reopened in fall 2010 with a variety of programs. A more recent school is Chaparral Elementary, located on the east end of Los Serranos, opened in August 2006. Both schools in Los Serranos are part of the Chino Valley Unified School District.
