= BAPS Shri Swaminarayan Mandir Chino Hills =

Hindu temple complex in California, US

BAPS Shri Swaminarayan Mandir
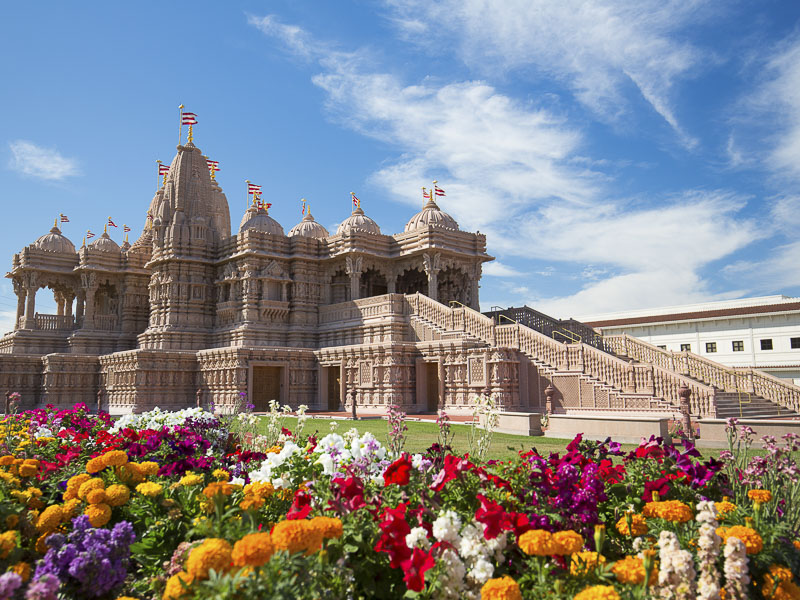
- Main staircase and traditional carved stone facade of the Mandir.

Religion
- Affiliation: Hinduism
- Deity: Swaminarayan, Radha Krishna, Sita-Ram, Shiva-Parvati

Location
- Location: Chino Hills; San Bernardino County
- State: California
- Country: United States
- Interactive map of BAPS Shri Swaminarayan Mandir

Architecture
- Type: North Indian / Shilpa Shastras
- Creator: Pramukh Swami Maharaj / BAPS
- Completed: December 2012

Website
- http://www.baps.org/Global-Network/North-America/LosAngeles.aspx

The BAPS Shri Swaminarayan Mandir (Note: The temple's unabbreviated name is the Bochasanwasi Akshar Purushottam Sanstha Shri Swaminarayan Mandir.) is a Hindu temple complex located in Chino Hills, in southwestern San Bernardino County in southern California. The temple belongs to the Bochasanwasi Akshar Purushottam Swaminarayan Sanstha denomination of Hinduism. However, the BAPS Shri Swaminarayan Mandir is open to visitors of all faiths.

== Architecture ==
The complex is the first earthquake-proof Mandir in the world. The BAPS Shri Swaminarayan Mandir is a traditional Hindu mandir that was completed in 2012. Situated on a 20-acre site with a 91-foot lotus-shaped pond, the complex has a cultural center, gymnasium and classrooms. Approximately 900 volunteers, including many second-generation Indian-Americans, volunteered approximately 1.3 million man hours to construct the Mandir. This mandir uses a solar power system to generate electricity and reduce adverse effects on the environment. The solar panel power system is expected to reduce 1,556 tons of CO_{2} emissions, which is the equivalent of planting 62,244 trees, over a 25-year period.

== History ==
In 1977, Pramukh Swami Maharaj, the former spiritual leader of BAPS (Bochasanwasi Shri Akshar Purushottam Swaminarayan Sanstha), visited California. During his first visit, he encouraged a small group of individuals to hold regular assemblies. He, and other senior swamis, returned nearly every year, nurturing and inspiring devotees. In 1984, Pramukh Swami Maharaj inaugurated a small center in Whittier, Los Angeles County. Nineteen years later, in 1996, the local group made a proposal to build a larger facility, including a traditional stone mandir, to fulfill Pramukh Swami's vision that he had shared with them almost two decades earlier and to accommodate their growing congregation. With his blessing, the group began searching for land. After reviewing a half-dozen parcels, Pramukh Swami Maharaj guided the group to a plot next to the 71 Freeway in the City of Chino Hills. With this thrust from their guru, the group successfully acquired the land and obtained all the necessary permits, studies and approvals to build the mandir and ten other buildings—a process that proved much more arduous and lengthy than they had anticipated. "Before the first public hearing, city staff misinterpreted that church and institutional zones are allowed to have towers up to 80 feet high. But only are institutional zones allowed to have such high towers, official said." The 17 June 2003 meeting continued and led to a July hearing despite voting unanimously in favor of the project, with the height matter outstanding. In August 2003, the City delayed plans to review the proposed Temple because of confusion surrounding the 164,000 square foot facility. "Plans for the temple will not be reviewing by the City Council on Aug. 12 2003, as originally scheduled." "Instead, city staff will meet 26 August, taking two additional weeks to investigate information noted by residents about the temple that has not been previously revealed is causing concern." On 14 September 2004, after a seven and half hour meeting with a crowd between 1200 and 1500 individuals, the Chino Hills City Council voted 4–1 to deny a code change that would allow the temple to be traditionally constructed.

"Several residents sharply criticized the BAPS public relations firm for conducting a publicity campaign that they say brought hundreds of non-residents to the meeting, including, council members from Artesia, Norwalk, and Diamond Bar, a judge and the chairman of the Santa Clara County Board of Supervisors." "Several residents said they opposed the temple because its designation as a landmark would attract tourist. "Why build a regional center in our small community of Chino Hills," said Scott Kuethen. Mayor Larson said he felt BAPS was not given the fair share they deserve. "This will be a loss to the community," he said. "Mayor Larson cast the lone "yes" vote stating that he didn't have any problems with the spires and supported the project 110%." "I support any religious institution that brings good to the community," he said later. Residents of Chino Hills objected to the Temple saying "it would generate too much traffic, ruin the city’s rural atmosphere and become an unwanted regional attraction."

Objections also surfaced from opponents who said the project would turn Chino Hills into a "Third World city" and haven for terrorists. "At least 1,600 comments – evenly split between supporting and opposing the proposal – have been received by city staff, prompting staff to move the council to Chino Hills High School." On September 4, 2005, BAPS performed an "auspicious groundbreaking ceremony" for the new temple. BAPS navigated a 14-year journey after first approaching the city in 1998 to build a temple on Peyton Drive.

=== Approvals ===
Code Change denied by the city council in 2004 amid public opposition to the Temple. Sentiments changed over the years until the Temple received wide community support and the code change was approved by the council in August 2011.

=== Final height approval ===
The BAPS Shri Swaminarayan Mandir in Chino Hills received the City of Chino Hill's unanimous approval to construct a traditional Mandir with spires up to 78 feet (24 m) in August 2011. Two hundred supporters signed up to speak, but 170 waived their rights in the interest of time.

== Construction ==
At least 900 volunteers including many second-generation Indian-American students gave their services, according to the temple authorities. At its opening, the Chino Hills Mayor Peter Rogers said, "The Mandir and cultural center will indeed be a place that Chino Hills can be proud of for so many, many generations." The temple, Mayor Rogers added, "is a beautiful testament to the hard work of your congregation who has spent several years to build this place of worship."

"If one word could sum up the construction of this mandir, it would be sacrifice," Rakesh Patel, the director of construction, was quoted as saying. "It was, indeed, the dedication, service, effort and sacrifice of hundreds of volunteers from doctors to lawyers to engineers to architects who completed this mandir. Whether it was raining or sweltering outside, volunteers did everything from heavy duty labor to planning and execution of the smallest thing for making this mandir."

== Structure ==
Constructed from 35,000 pieces of meticulously hand carved Italian Carrara marble and Indian Pink sandstone, the BAPS Shri Swaminarayan Mandir in Chino Hills, encompasses five pinnacles, two large domes, four balconies, 122 pillars and 129 archways. From the external walls and domes to the inside pillars and ceilings, the Mandir is completely etched with intricate carvings in marble and sandstone. The 6,600 hand-carved motifs depict a mosaic of tales of inspiration, devotion and dedication, along with historical figures from Hinduism. Artisans created the carvings in India with great love, skill and patience before the pieces were shipped to Chino Hills.

=== Features ===
BAPS Shri Swaminarayan Mandir Chino Hills features by the numbers:

- 5 Shikhar (pinnacle)
- 2 intricately carved domes
- 4 balconies with hundreds of carved motifs
- 35,000 individual stone pieces placed together like a puzzle
- 122 hand-carved pillars
- 129 seamlessly placed archways
- 6,600 hand-carved motifs and images
- 1,500 craftsmen in India
- 91 foot, Lotus-shaped reflection pond and fountain
- 40 base-isolator units to protect against seismic activity
- 597 kW of clean energy generated annually by state-of-the-art solar system
- 20 skylights for Natural and Energy Saving Lighting
- 900 volunteers gave their services
- 1.3 million man hours of construction.
- Built to last 1000 years

== Charitable initiatives ==
=== Health and safety fairs ===
The BAPS Charities Health Fair in Chino Hills is one of over 40 such fairs which BAPS Charities organizes annually throughout North America. In total, over 2,500 health care professionals from local communities treated nearly 12,500 patients across the nation. The success of such an event is attributed to the collaborative effort between medical professionals within the community to volunteer their time and effort towards such a cause.

The BAPS Shri Swaminarayan Mandir, in Chino Hills, hosted a community health fair providing free check-ups and numerous tests for over 425 participants. In addition to the health screenings and consultations, a blood drive was coordinated through LifeStream. Ninety-nine people registered to donate blood and 89 pints of blood were collected.

The BAPS Shri Swaminarayan Mandir, in Chino Hills, hosted its first annual Children's Health and Safety Day aimed at giving parents, caretakers, and most importantly children, the knowledge and strength to pave the path to a healthier future. The Chino Valley Fire Department participated in the event by allowing children to explore the fire truck and learn about fire safety. Jeff Westfall from the Chino Valley Fire Department stated, "We are here doing a public demonstration for BAPS Charities. The kids are having a good time."

=== Walkathons ===
On October 7, 2006, the mandir held its 9th annual walkathon at Chino Hills High School. "The event was significantly unique as the American Cancer Society joined together with BAPS Care as beneficiaries in this humanitarian cause. The organization is a testament to community service, said Ed Graham, Mayor of Chino Hills." As a local beneficiary to its annual walkathon, the students of Chino Hills High School received a donation of $5,000.00 from BAPS Charities.

=== COVID-19 Pandemic ===
During the COVID-19 global pandemic, BAPS Charities has provided relief and assistance worldwide. On March 29, 2020, all six BAPS shikharbaddha mandirs in North America broadcast a special mahapuja performed by the swamis to pray on behalf of all those affected by the COVID-19 pandemic. Over 12,000 families in North America participated.

On April 17, 2021, BAPS Charities hosted a vaccination drive in conjunction with Walmart at the mandir. Other supporters included civic leaders and firefighters from the Chino Valley Independent Fire District. 450 individuals were vaccinated. US Surgeon General Vivek Murthy praised BAPS Charities for hosting vaccination clinics at mandirs which increased accessibility for the elderly.

== Gallery ==
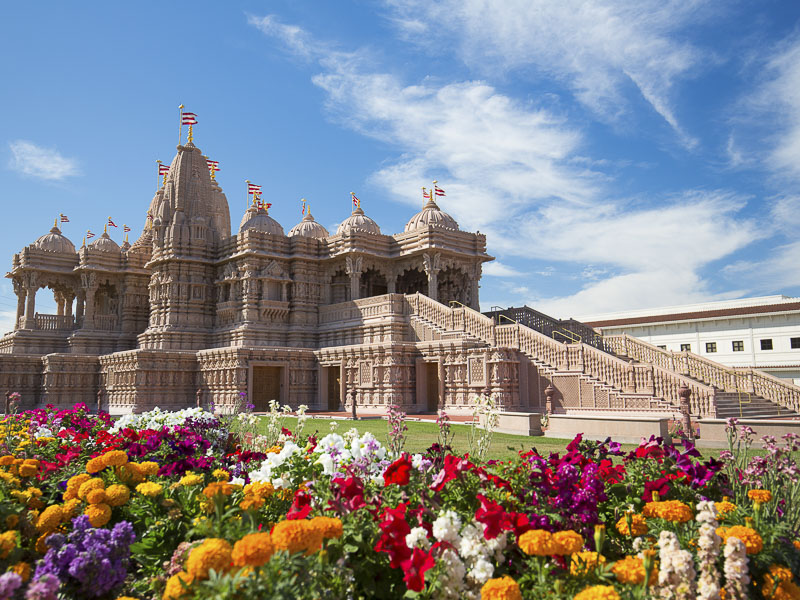

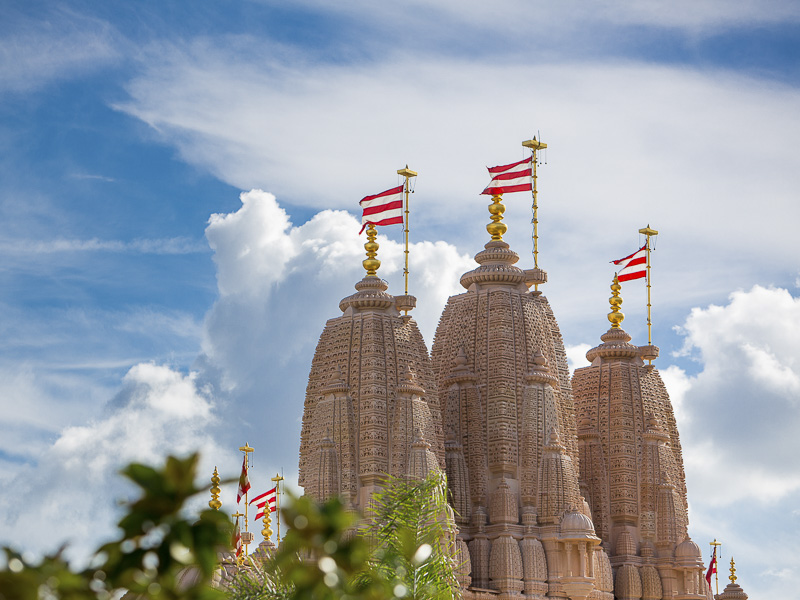

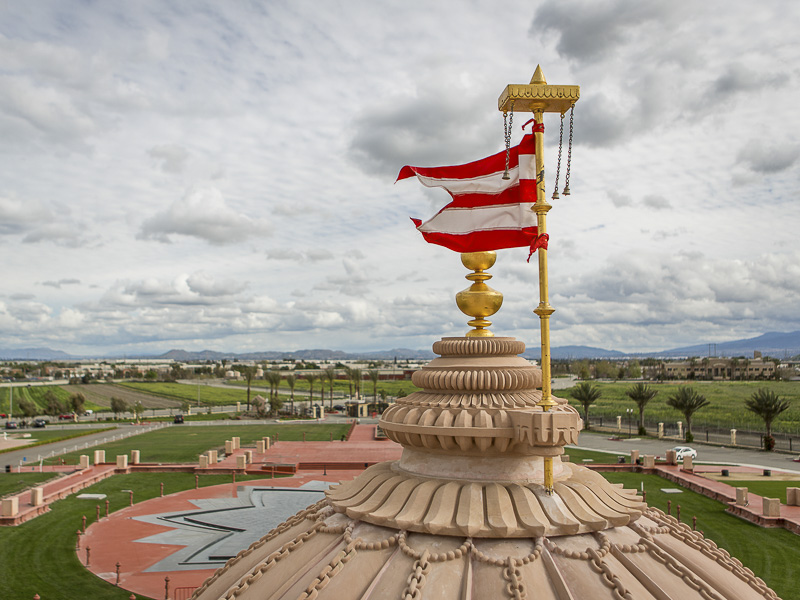

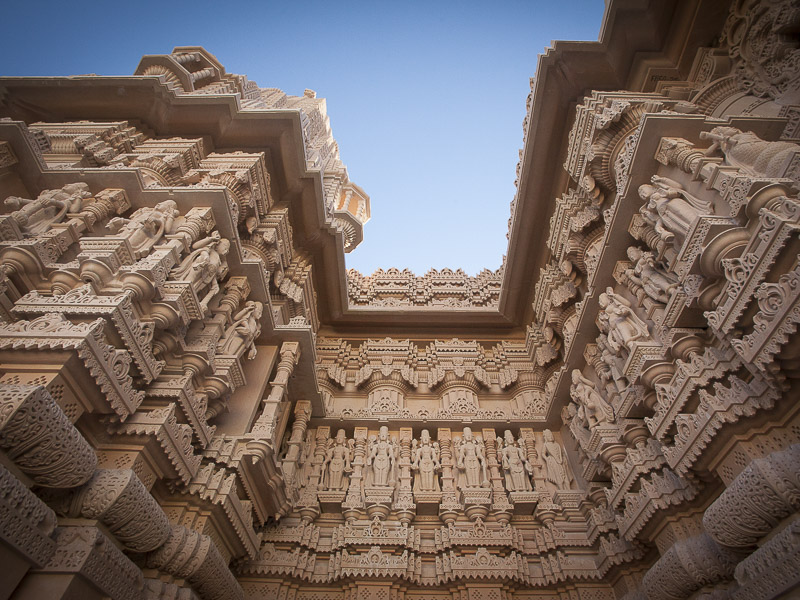

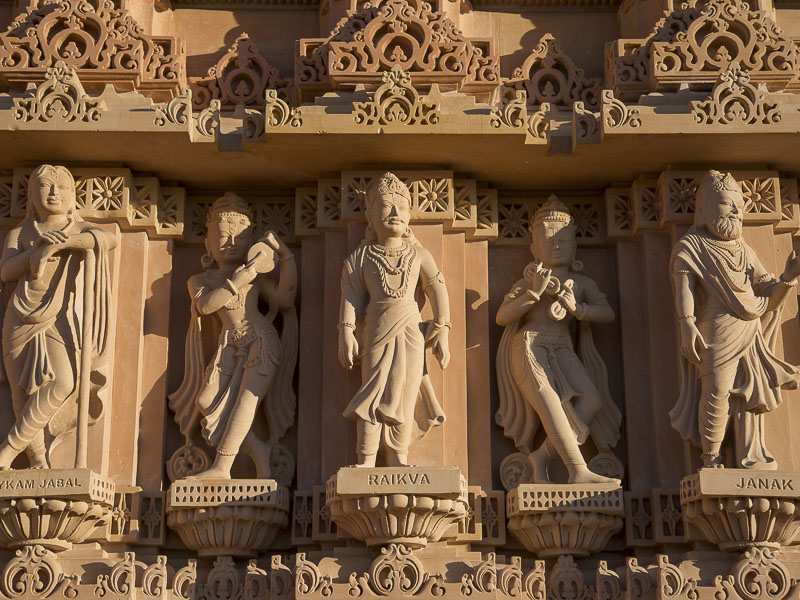

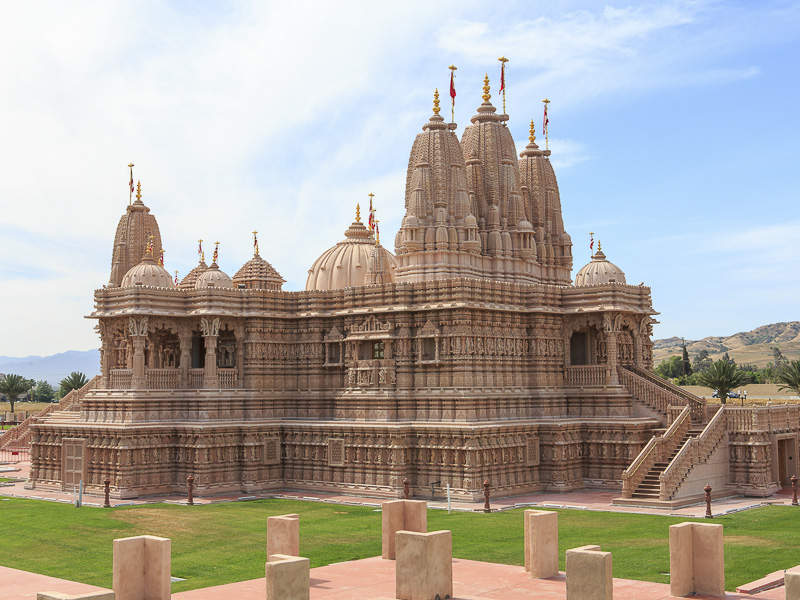

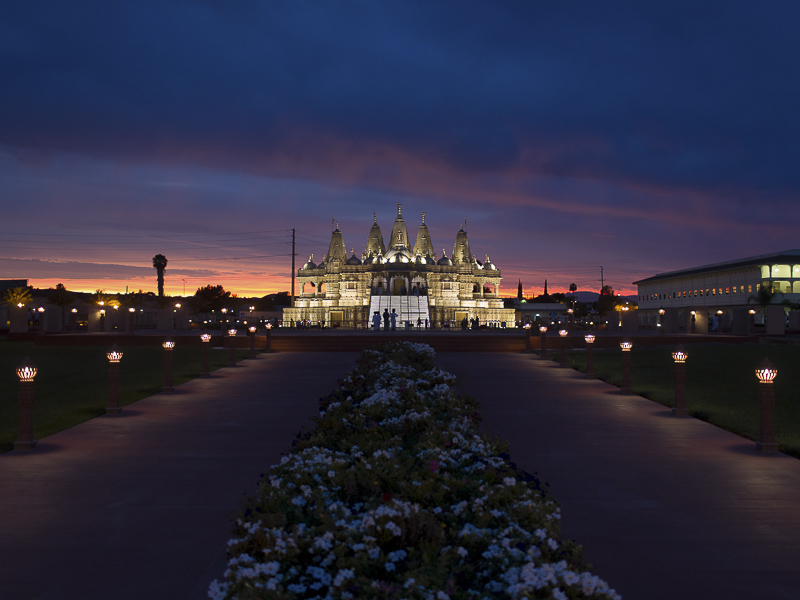

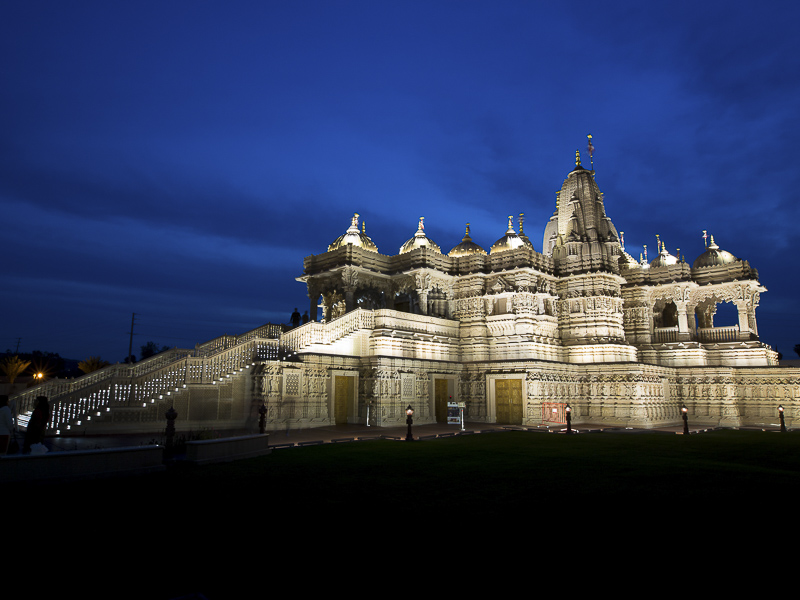

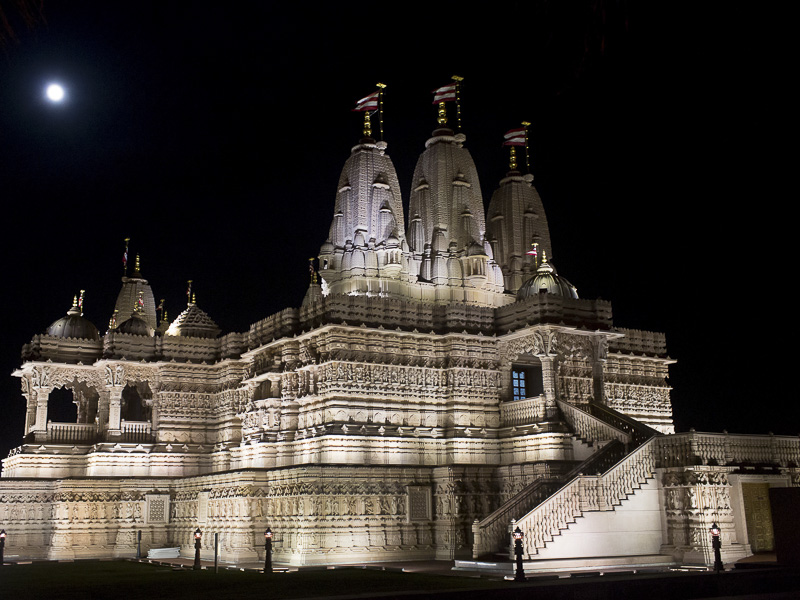

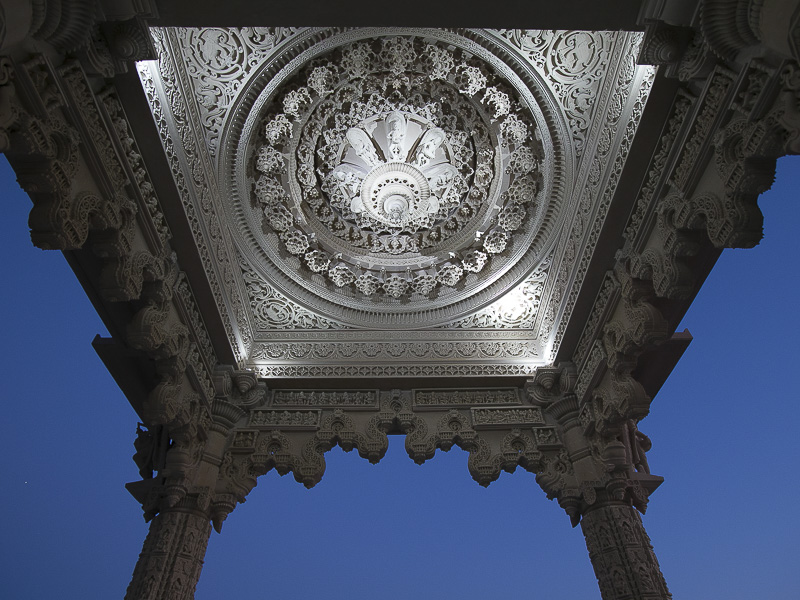

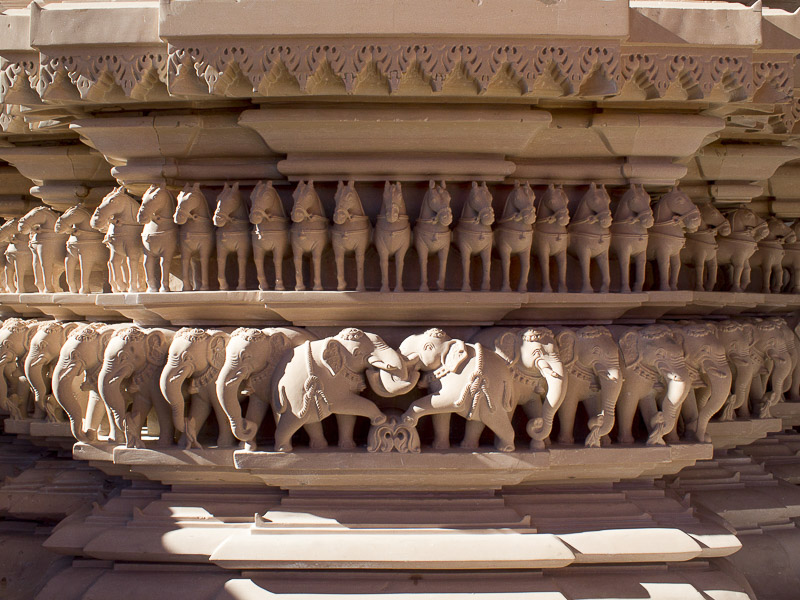

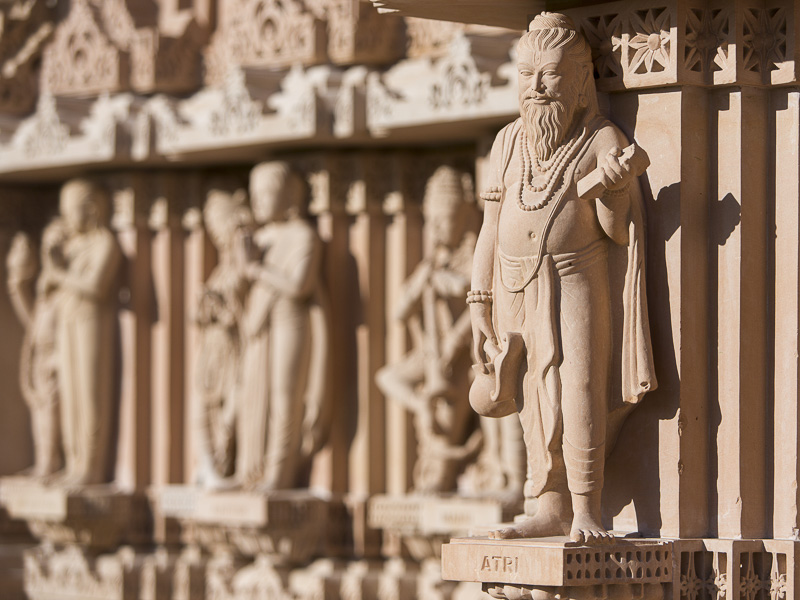

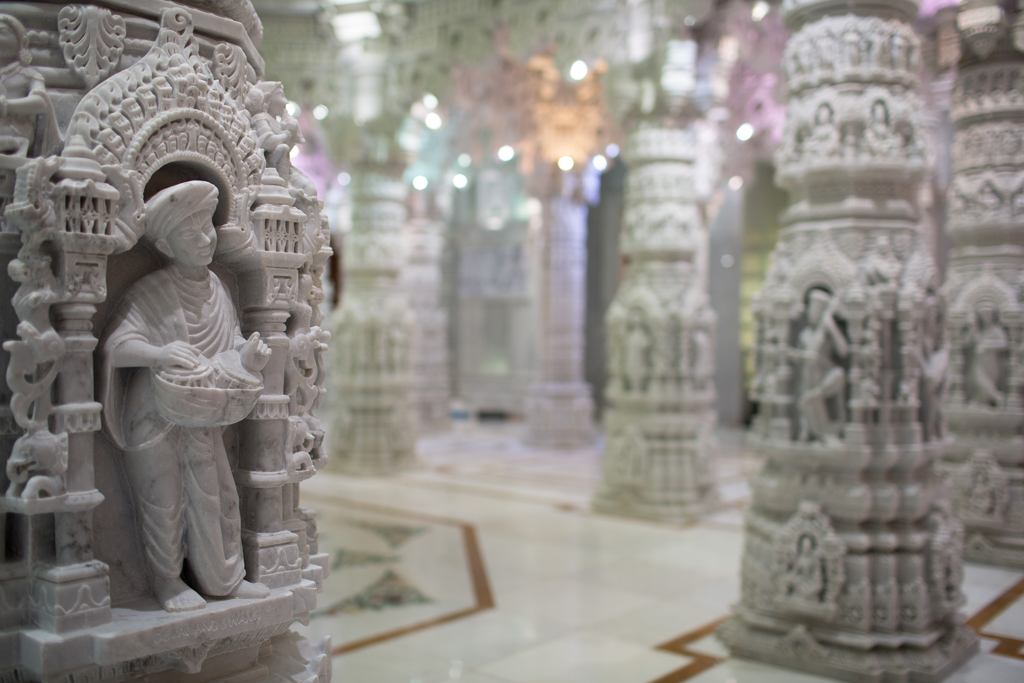

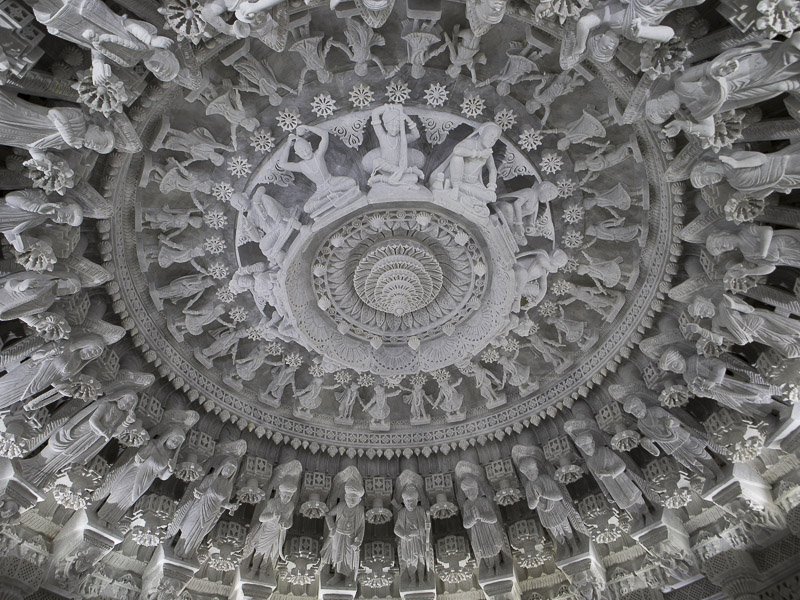

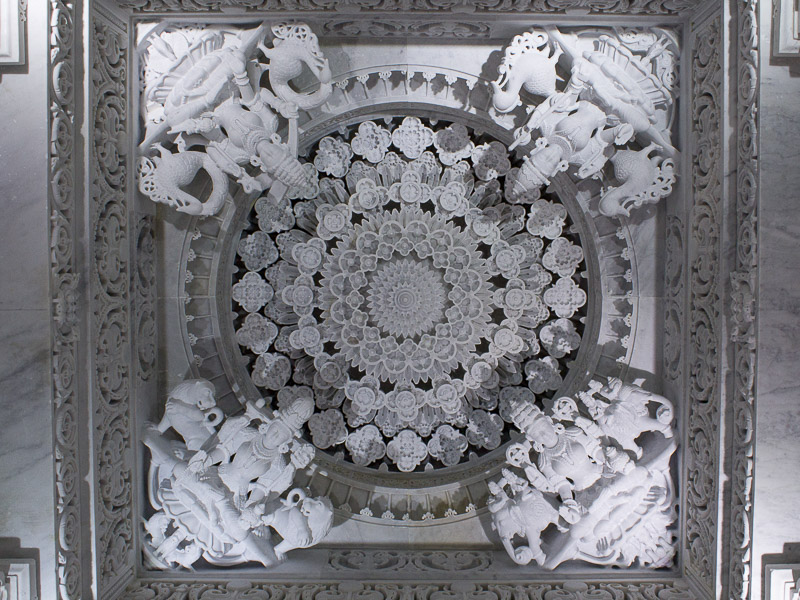

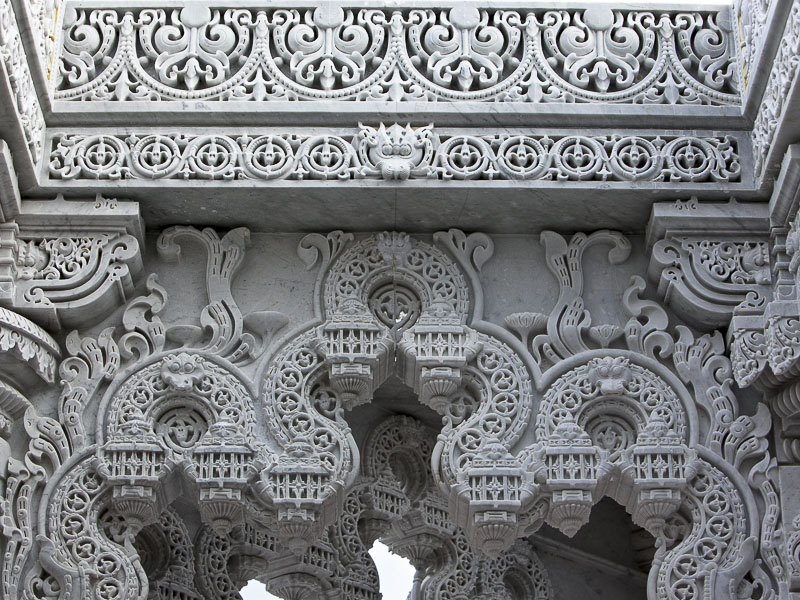

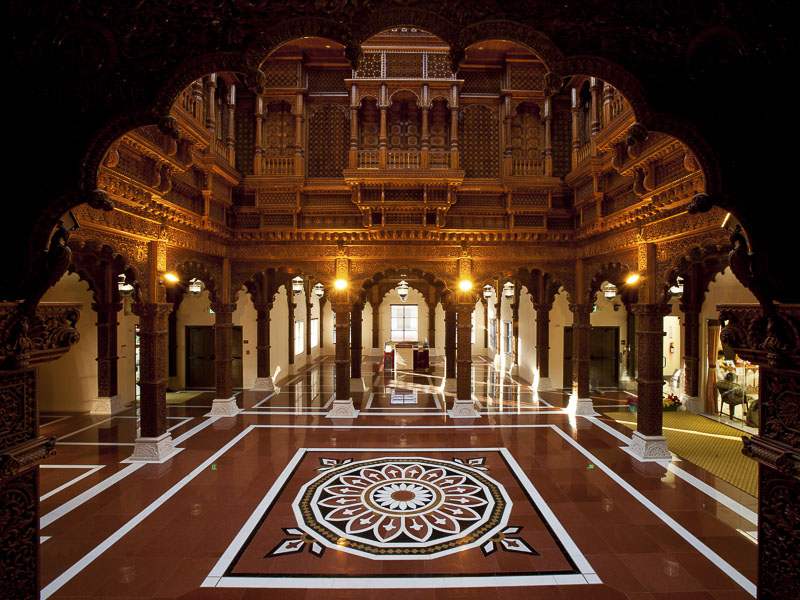

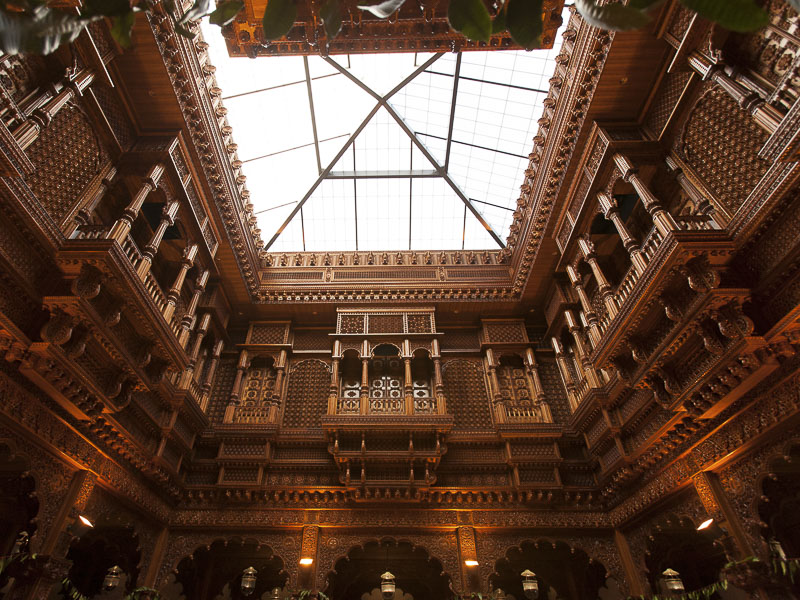

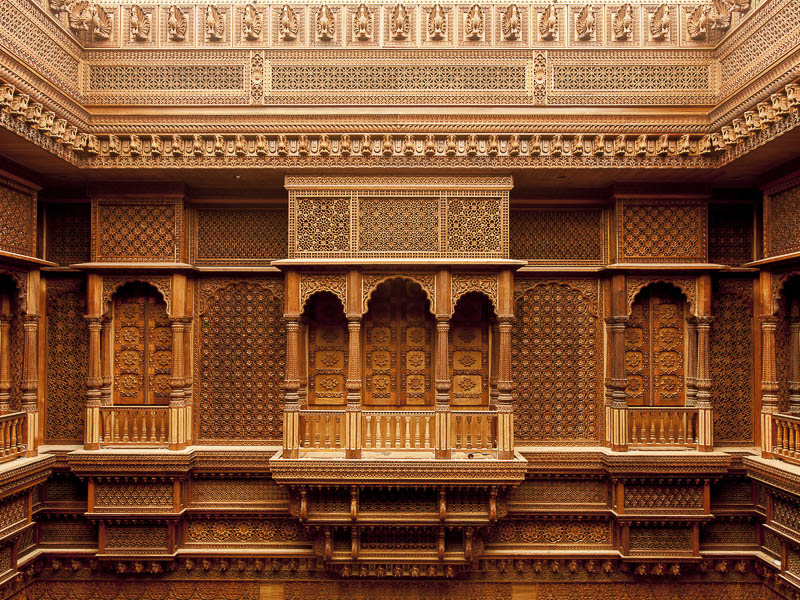

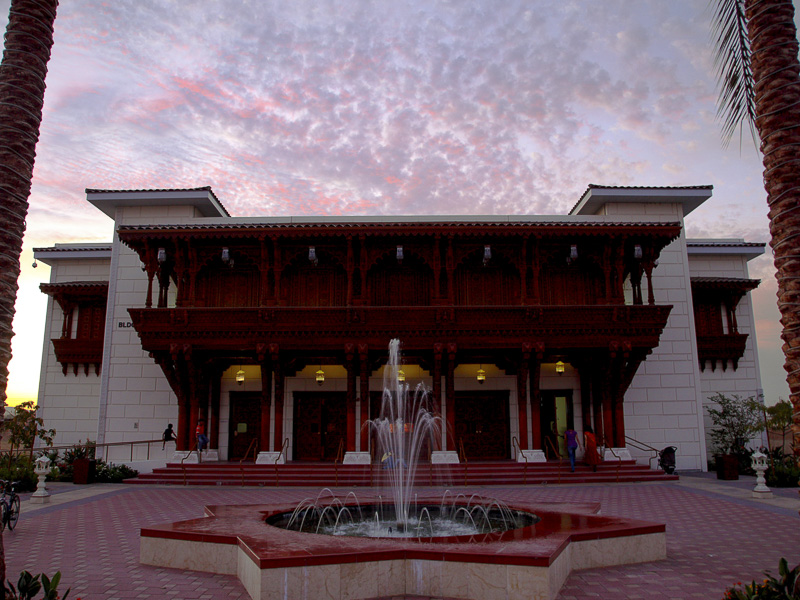

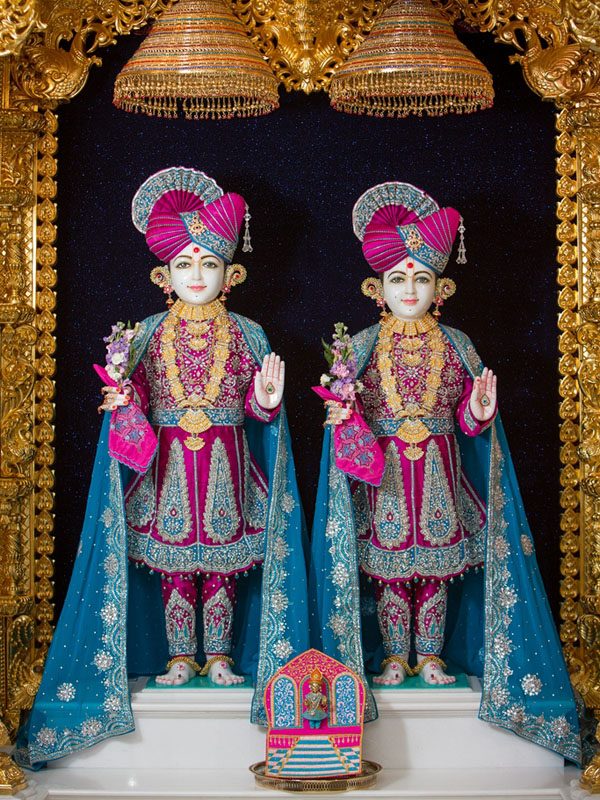
Bhagwan Swaminarayan and Gunatitanand Swami

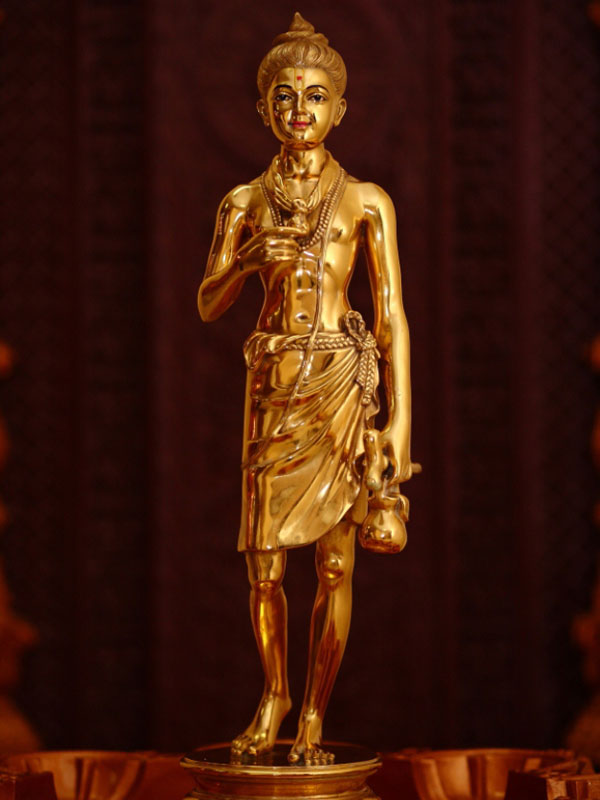
Neelkanth Varni (Swaminarayan)

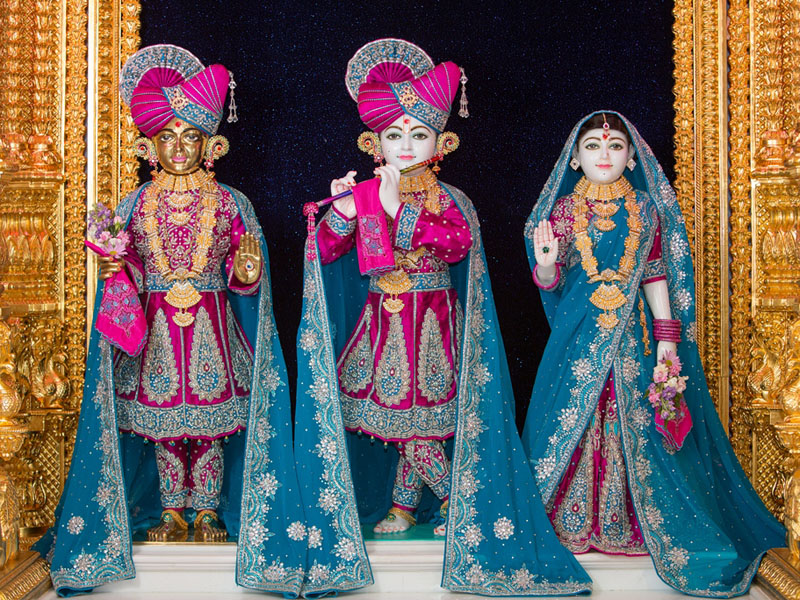
Hari Krishna Maharaj and Radha Krishna

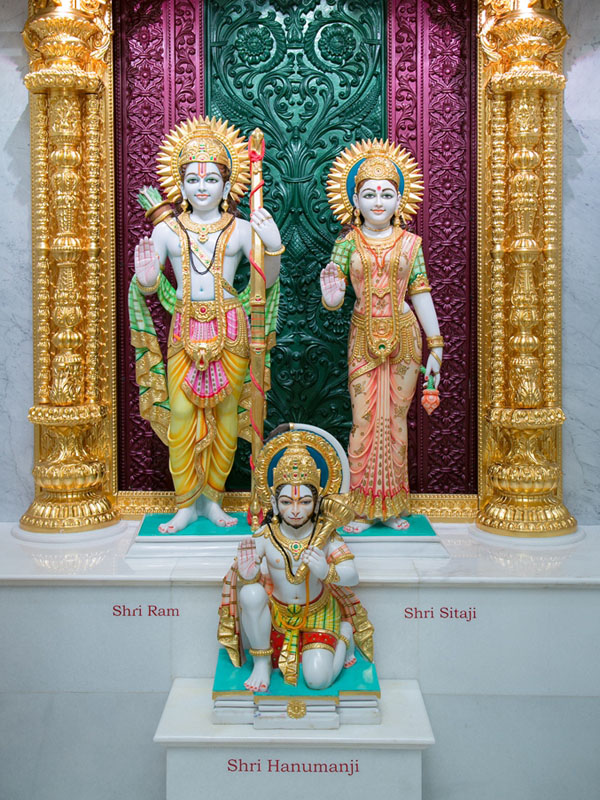
Rama Sita

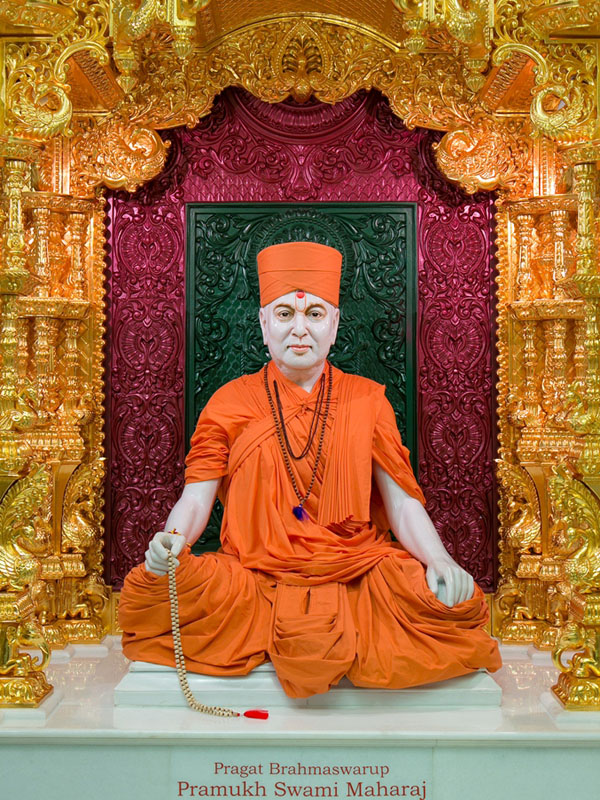
Pramukh Swami Maharaj

== See also ==
- Hinduism in California
- Hindu temples in the United States
