= Justin Cole =

American football player (born 1987)

No. 52, 93
- Position: Defensive end

Personal information
- Born: November 22, 1987 (age 38); Pasadena, California, U.S.
- Listed height: 6 ft 3 in (1.91 m)
- Listed weight: 242 lb (110 kg)

Career information
- High school: Chino Hills (Chino Hills, California)
- College: San Jose State
- NFL draft: 2010: undrafted

Career history
- Kansas City Chiefs (2010−2011); St. Louis Rams (2011−2012); Cleveland Browns (2013)*; Oakland Raiders (2014)*; Saskatchewan Roughriders (2014)*; Winnipeg Blue Bombers (2015−2016)
- * Offseason or practice squad member only

Awards and highlights
- 2× Second-team All-WAC (2008, 2009)

Career NFL statistics
- Total tackles: 9
- Stats at Pro Football Reference

Career CFL statistics
- Total tackles: 20
- Sacks: 7
- Forced fumbles: 2
- Interceptions: 1

Justin Mitchell Alexander Cole (born November 22, 1987) is an American former professional football player who was a linebacker in the National Football League (NFL). He played college football for the San Jose State Spartans, recovering five fumbles and forced another four in 49 games.

Cole was a member of the Kansas City Chiefs, St. Louis Rams, Cleveland Browns, Oakland Raiders, Saskatchewan Roughriders and Winnipeg Blue Bombers.

== Early life ==
Cole attended Chino Hills High School, where he was credited with 36 tackles and four quarterback sacks and was named his team's "Most Improved Player" as a senior. He received first-team All-Sierra League and second-team All-Inland Empire honors in 2004.

Regarded as a two-star recruit by Rivals.com, he was not listed among the top prospects of his class.

== College career ==
After redshirting his initial year at San Jose State University, Cole recorded 32 tackles, including 9.5 tackles for loss, and 4.0 quarterback sacks in his freshman year. He earned freshman All-America recognition from the Sporting News. Cole added 36 tackles in his sophomore season.

In his junior year, Cole doubled his career tackle total with 68 stops, and also had 5.0 sacks (sixth in the WAC). He came up with his first career interception, a 62-yard interception return for a touchdown and his single game career best of 12 tackles (1 solo, 11 assisted) against Boise State. He earned a Second-team All-WAC selection, which he also received in his senior year. Cole graduated from San Jose State with a B.S. in business management in 2010.

== Professional career ==
Pre-draft measurables
Height	Weight	40-yard dash	10-yard split	20-yard split	20-yard shuttle	Three-cone drill	Vertical jump	Broad jump	Bench press
6 ft 3 1/8 in (1.91 m)	242 lb (110 kg)	4.76 s	1.63 s	2.70 s	4.42 s	7.13 s	34 1/2 in (0.88 m)	9 ft 9 in (2.97 m)	22 reps
All values from NFL Combine

=== St. Louis Rams ===
After being signed to the Kansas City Chiefs' practice squad on September 4, 2011, he was signed by the St. Louis Rams on November 14.

=== Cleveland Browns ===
Cole signed with the Cleveland Browns on July 24, 2013. The Browns cut Cole on August 30.

=== Oakland Raiders ===
Cole was signed by the Oakland Raiders during the 2014 offseason, but was released on August 24, 2014.

=== Saskatchewan Roughriders ===
Cole was signed to the Saskatchewan Roughriders practice roster on October 8, 2014. Cole was waived on November 6.

=== Winnipeg Blue Bombers ===
Cole played in five games for the Winnipeg Blue Bombers in 2015, recording three defensive tackles and two sacks. He played in 11 games for the Blue Bombers in 2016, recording 15 defensive tackles, two special teams tackles, five sacks, one interception and two forced fumbles.
