= Eli Scott =

American basketball player (born 1999)

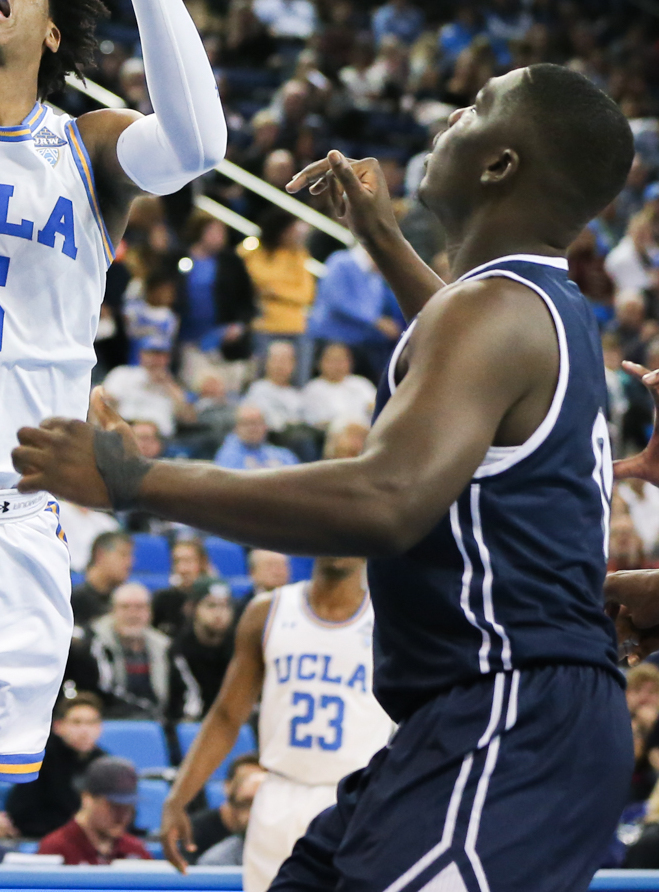
- Scott with Loyola Marymount in 2018

Colorado Mesa Mavericks
- Position: Assistant coach

Personal information
- Born: April 19, 1999 (age 27) West Covina, California, U.S.
- Listed height: 6 ft 6 in (1.98 m)
- Listed weight: 232 lb (105 kg)

Career information
- High school: Upland (Upland, California); Chino Hills (Chino Hills, California)
- College: Loyola Marymount (2017–2022)
- Playing career: 2022–2023
- Coaching career: 2025–present

Career history

Playing
- 2022–2023: MBK Handlová

Coaching
- 2025-present: Colorado Mesa

Career highlights
- First-team All-WCC (2021); 2× Second-team All-WCC (2020, 2022); WCC All-Freshman Team (2018)

Elizjah Johnson Scott (born April 19, 1999) is an American former professional basketball player who last played for MBK Handlová of the Slovak Basketball League (SBL). He played college basketball for the Loyola Marymount Lions of the West Coast Conference (WCC). He is currently an Assistant Men's Basketball Coach for the Colorado Mesa University Men's Basketball team.

== High school career ==
Scott attended Upland High School in Upland, California before transferring to Chino Hills High School in Chino Hills, California for his sophomore season. He was ruled ineligible for his first year by the CIF Southern Section. As a junior, he started alongside Lonzo Ball, LaMelo Ball, LiAngelo Ball and Onyeka Okongwu, helping Chino Hills achieve a 35–0 record and win the CIF Open Division state title. He averaged 19.4 points, 15 rebounds and five assists per game as senior. He committed to playing college basketball for Loyola Marymount over offers from UC Riverside, UC Irvine and Utah State.

== College career ==
As a freshman at Loyola Marymount, Scott averaged 12.6 points and 7.3 rebounds per game. He set the program freshman record with 225 rebounds and was named to the West Coast Conference (WCC) All-Freshman Team. Scott averaged 7.9 points and 4.8 rebounds per game as a sophomore after missing his first six games with an illness. On December 4, 2019, he posted a junior season-high 31 points and 10 rebounds in a 76–64 victory over Colorado. In his next game, Scott recorded the first triple-double in program history, with 21 points, 13 rebounds and 13 assists in an 83–67 win over Grambling State. He averaged 15.5 points, 6.7 rebounds and 4.3 assists per game as a junior, earning Second Team All-WCC honors. On February 16, 2021, Scott scored a career-high 37 points and made the game-winning shot with 14 seconds left in a 76–73 victory over Santa Clara. He averaged 18 points, 8.2 rebounds and 3.6 assists per game as a senior, earning First Team All-WCC honors. Scott opted to return to Loyola Marymount for a fifth year. Scott was named to the Second Team All-WCC in 2022.

On March 4, 2022, Scott surpassed the 2,000 career point mark in his final game for LMU, a second round loss to BYU in the 2022 WCC tournament. He finished his career with 2,002 points, sixth in school history.

== Professional career ==
On August 27, 2022, Scott signed with Kouvot of the Korisliiga. On September 17, 2022, his contract was terminated.

== Career statistics ==
Legend
GP	Games played	GS	Games started	MPG	Minutes per game
FG%	Field goal percentage	3P%	3-point field goal percentage	FT%	Free throw percentage
RPG	Rebounds per game	APG	Assists per game	SPG	Steals per game
BPG	Blocks per game	PPG	Points per game	**Bold**	Career high

=== College ===
Year	Team	GP	GS	MPG	FG%	3P%	FT%	RPG	APG	SPG	BPG	PPG
2017–18	Loyola Marymount	31	22	30.9	.471	.133	.606	7.3	2.3	.8	.3	12.6
2018–19	Loyola Marymount	27	18	24.2	.519	**.500**	.635	4.8	2.5	.6	.4	7.9
2019–20	Loyola Marymount	**32**	**32**	34.6	**.528**	.290	.639	6.7	**4.3**	**1.0**	.2	15.5
2020–21	Loyola Marymount	22	22	**35.6**	.495	.242	.704	**8.2**	3.6	.6	**.5**	**18.0**
2021–22	Loyola Marymount	29	29	35.4	.518	.182	**.761**	6.4	3.0	.7	.4	17.4
Career		141	123	32.1	.506	.237	.672	6.6	3.1	.8	.3	14.2

=== SBL (Professional) ===
Year	Team	GP	GS	MPG	FG%	3P%	FT%	RPG	APG	SPG	BPG	PPG
2022-23	MBK Handlová	**26**	**26**	**34.8**	**.580**	**.346**	**.667**	**8.3**	**3.3**	**0.8**	**0.1**	**19.1**

== Coaching Career ==
In 2025, Eli Scott was hired as an Assistant Men's Basketball Coach of the Colorado Mesa University Men's Basketball team.
