= The Shops at Chino Hills =

- Location: Chino Hills, California, U.S.
- Address: 13920 City Center Drive
- Opened: May 23, 2008; 18 years ago
- Previous names: The Shoppes at Chino Hills (2008–2026)
- Developer: Opus West
- Owner: Stockdale Capital Partners; Hamilton Lane
- Architect: Altoon + Porter
- Num. of stores: 70
- Num. of anchor tenants: 2
- Floor area: 378,140 sq ft (35,130 m^{2})
- Parking: Parking lot
- Website: shoppesatchinohills.com

The Shops at Chino Hills (formerly known as The Shoppes at Chino Hills) is a lifestyle center located in Chino Hills, California, designed to be the downtown center for the city of Chino Hills.

== History ==
The center opened on May 23, 2008, with 65 stores. It was completed at a cost of $130 million and developed by Opus West. After Opus West filed for bankruptcy in 2009, the center was then sold to a bank group led by Bank of America. The center was sold to MX3 Ventures of Newport Beach in 2010 before being sold to Dunhill Partners for $147 million in 2015. The center was purchased by Stockdale Capital Partners in 2026 for $157 million, with Hamilton Lane as co-investors.
