= Cory Harkey =

American football player and coach (born 1990)

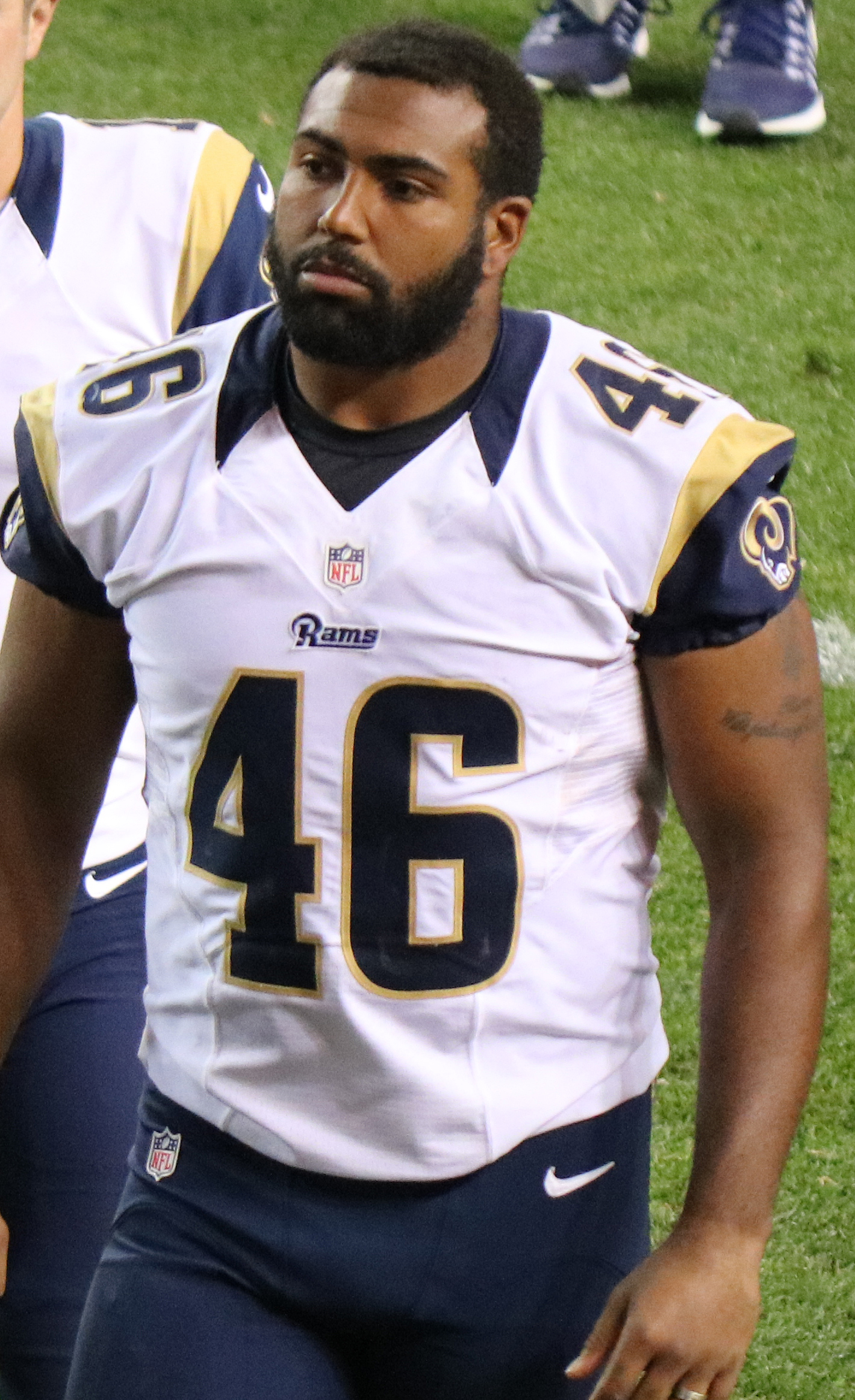
- Harkey with the Los Angeles Rams in 2016

Green Bay Packers
- Title: Assistant special teams coach

Personal information
- Born: June 17, 1990 (age 36); Chicago, Illinois, U.S.
- Listed height: 6 ft 4 in (1.93 m)
- Listed weight: 259 lb (117 kg)

Career information
- Position: Tight end (No. 46)
- High school: Chino Hills (Chino Hills, California)
- College: UCLA (2008–2011)
- NFL draft: 2012: undrafted

Career history

Playing
- St. Louis / Los Angeles Rams (2012–2016)

Coaching
- Azusa Pacific (2019–2020) Tight ends coach; Tennessee State (2021) Tight ends coach; Buffalo Bills (2022–2024) Assistant special teams coach; Green Bay Packers (2025) Special teams quality control coach; Green Bay Packers (2026–present) Assistant special teams coach

Career NFL statistics
- Receptions: 27
- Receiving yards: 215
- Receiving touchdowns: 3
- Games played: 55
- Stats at Pro Football Reference

Cory Nicholas Harkey (born June 17, 1990) is an American football coach and former player who is the assistant special teams coach for the Green Bay Packers of the National Football League (NFL). He played professionally as a tight end in the NFL. Harkey played college football for the UCLA Bruins and was signed by the St. Louis Rams as an undrafted free agent in 2012.

== College career ==
After attending Chino Hills High School, he played college football at UCLA, and played in every game of his college career. He started seven games during his freshman season and was used primarily as a blocker, although he did have five catches for 40 yards and a touchdown. He once again was used almost exclusively as a blocker during his sophomore year, starting four games out of double tight-end formations, totaling eight receptions for 41 yards and a touchdown. During Harkey's junior year, he started every game for the Bruins, having his most productive year as a receiver. He finished fifth on the team in receptions, having 14 catches for 140 yards. Harkey once again started every game for the team during his senior year; however, he had only one reception for 10 yards. Following the season, the Bruins coaching staff awarded Harkey the Jerry Long "Heart" Award and Kenneth S. Washington Award for Outstanding Senior of the Year.

== Professional career ==
Harkey was invited to the 2012 NFL Scouting Combine.

Pre-draft measurables
Height	Weight	Arm length	Hand span	Wingspan	40-yard dash	10-yard split	20-yard split	20-yard shuttle	Three-cone drill	Vertical jump	Broad jump	Bench press
6 ft 4 in (1.93 m)	260 lb (118 kg)	32 in (0.81 m)	9 3/8 in (0.24 m)	6 ft 5 1/2 in (1.97 m)	5.09 s	1.79 s	2.96 s	4.49 s	7.40 s	26.5 in (0.67 m)	9 ft 4 in (2.84 m)	14 reps
All values from NFL Combine/Pro Day

On May 8, 2012, Harkey was signed by the St. Louis Rams as an undrafted free agent. At the conclusion of 2012 training camp, Harkey was released and placed on the Rams practice squad. He was elevated to the active roster on November 17, taking the roster place of Kellen Heard, who had been released the previous week. Harkey dressed in his first game on the roster and was targeted once. He scored his first touchdown against the Houston Texans on October 13, 2013. Harkey has been frequently utilized as a fullback with the Rams.

In March 2015, Harkey signed a one-year restricted free-agent tender offer.

Harkey was placed on injured reserve on December 13, 2016, with a triceps injury. On September 2, 2017, Harkey was released by the Rams.

== Coaching career ==
Harkey joined the Green Bay Packers as a special teams quality control coach prior to the 2025 season. On March 19, 2026, Harkey was promoted to the role of assistant special teams coach.

== Personal life ==
Harkey is the son of former Major League Baseball player Mike Harkey, who spent more than two decades coaching in the minor and major leagues, most recently for the New York Yankees in 2025. He says that former Kansas City Chiefs and Atlanta Falcons tight end Tony Gonzalez is his biggest inspiration as a player.
