= Zach Collier =

American baseball player (born 1990)

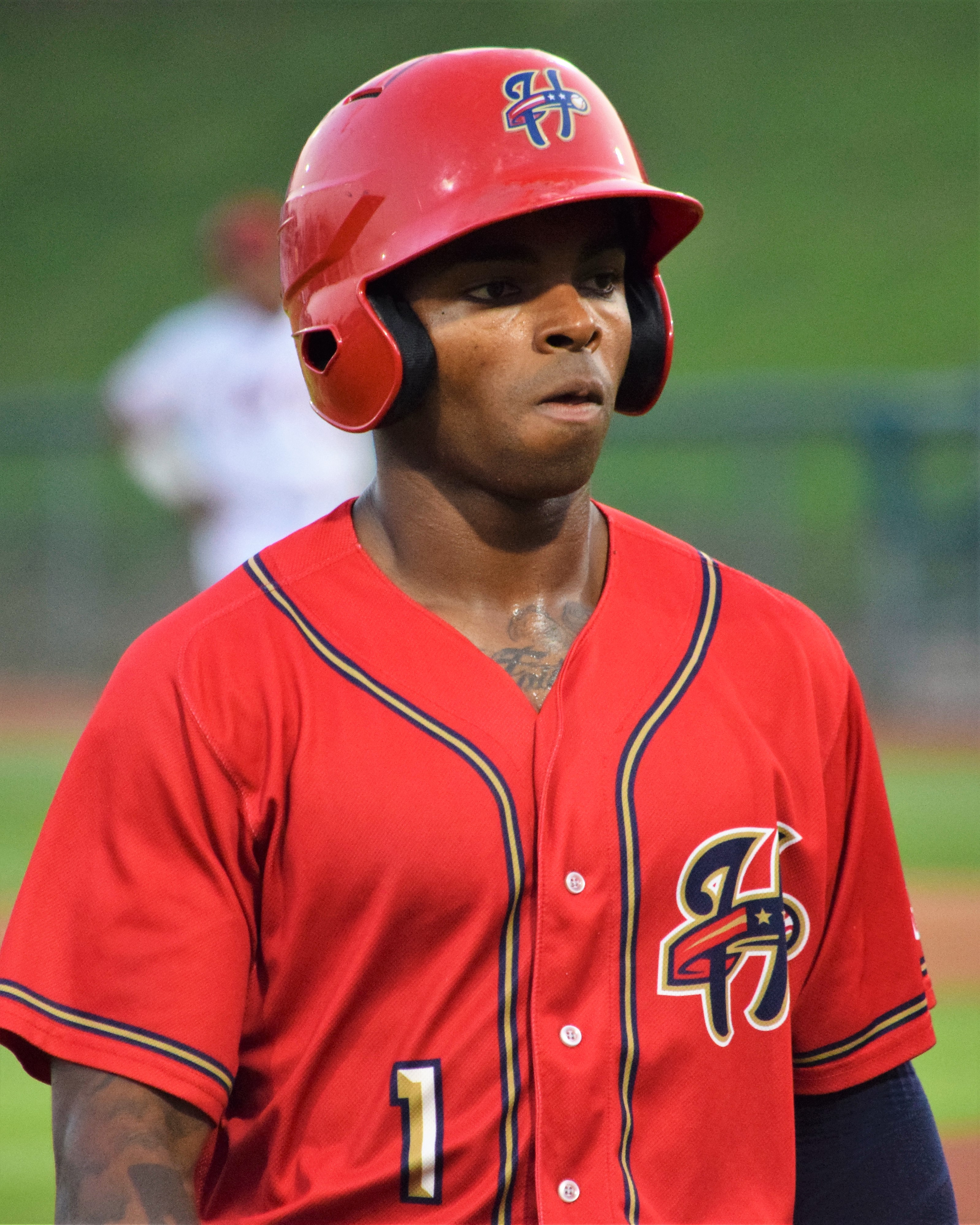
- Collier with the Harrisburg Senators in 2018
- Outfielder
- Born: September 8, 1990 (age 35); Chino Hills, California, U.S.
- Bats: Left Throws: Left
- Stats at Baseball Reference

Zach Collier (born September 8, 1990) is an American former professional baseball outfielder. He was drafted by the Philadelphia Phillies in the first round of the 2008 Major League Baseball draft.

== Early life ==
Collier attended Chino Hills High School in California, where he played baseball. As a sophomore, he collapsed at baseball practice and was diagnosed with a birth defect that necessitated heart surgery. Collier's physician initially did not want him to return to baseball, but Collier was cleared to play about four months after the surgery. After Collier recovered from surgery, he was noticed by a scout from the Chicago Cubs. The scout asked former major league player Chris Gwynn to provide some instruction to Collier. He gained broader attention after working out at the Major League Baseball Urban Youth Academy.

== Career ==
=== Philadelphia Phillies ===
The Philadelphia Phillies selected Collier in the first round (34th overall) of the 2008 Major League Baseball draft. Jim Callis of Baseball America commented on Philadelphia's early draft choices, referring to Collier and three other draftees as "classic high-upside, high-risk players. If they hit on those four guys, they could have four all-stars." He made his professional debut with the Gulf Coast League Phillies, batting .271 in 37 games.

The next season, Collier split the year between the Low-A Williamsport Crosscutters of the New York–Penn League and the Single-A Lakewood BlueClaws, collecting had 20 stolen bases and eight triples, but recording a low .221 batting average. Collier missed the 2010 season due to wrist surgery. In 2011, Collier returned to Lakewood and hit .255 while registering 35 stolen bases. After the season, baseball officials announced a 50-game suspension of Collier because of a positive test for amphetamine. In 2012, Collier told The Philadelphia Inquirer that his positive test resulted from the use of Adderall without a prescription. He said that he had always struggled with attention span in school and even while running the bases, so he thought that the medication would help.

Collier was added to the Phillies 40-man roster on November 20, 2012. He spent the 2013 season in Double-A with the Reading Fightin Phils, slashing .222/.310/.348 with 8 home runs, 36 RBI, and 17 stolen bases. He was assigned to Reading to begin the 2014 season, but was designated for assignment by Philadelphia on June 27, 2014, following the promotion of Koyie Hill. In August 2014, Collier had a four-game stretch in which he hit five home runs with Reading. Collier hit .240/.318/.408 with 9 home runs and 29 RBI in 86 games in Double-A and elected free agency after the year.

=== Lancaster Barnstormers ===
On March 25, 2015, Collier signed with the Lancaster Barnstormers of the Atlantic League of Professional Baseball. In 63 games with Lancaster, Collier batted .277/.356/.454 with 7 home runs and 34 RBI. He became a free agent after the 2015 season.

=== Washington Nationals ===
On December 18, 2015, Collier signed a minor league contract with the Washington Nationals organization. He was assigned to the Triple-A Syracuse Chiefs to begin the 2016 season, and also spent time with the Double-A Harrisburg Senators, batting .251/.311/.373 with 4 home runs and 31 RBI between the two teams. In 2017, Collier split the year between Syracuse, Harrisburg, and the Low-A Auburn Doubledays, hitting .281/.361/.482 with 8 home runs and 24 RBI in 68 games between the three teams. In 2018, Collier spent the year in Harrisburg and slashed .212/.318/.358 with 6 home runs and 40 RBI in 102 games. He elected free agency following the season on November 2, 2018.

Collier re-signed with the Nationals organization on a new minor league contract on November 19, 2018. Collier was assigned to Harrisburg to begin the year, and only played in 7 games between Auburn and Harrisburg before he was released by the Nationals organization on July 12, 2019.

=== New Britain Bees ===
On July 21, 2019, Collier signed with the New Britain Bees of the Atlantic League of Professional Baseball. In 54 games with the Bees, Collier slashed .237/.325/.405 with 6 home runs and 19 RBI.

=== Southern Maryland Blue Crabs ===
Following the 2019 season, the Bees moved to the Futures Collegiate Baseball League, and Collier was drafted by the Southern Maryland Blue Crabs in the Bees dispersal draft. However, Collier did not play in a game in 2020 due to the cancellation of the ALPB season because of the COVID-19 pandemic. He became a free agent following the year. On March 30, 2021, Collier re-signed with the Blue Crabs. He was named the defensive player of the year for the Crabs in 2021. He became a free agent following the season.

On April 1, 2022, Collier re-signed with the Blue Crabs for his second season with the club. He made 105 appearances for the team, slashing .255/.356/.419 with seven home runs, 58 RBI, and nine stolen bases. Collier became a free agent following the season.
