= Boys Republic =

- Chino Hills, California

Information
- Type: Private
- Established: 1907
- Grades: 9–12
- Enrollment: 47 (2024-2025)
- Athletics conference: CIF – Southern Section; Arrowhead League
- Website: boysrepublic.org

Boys Republic is a private, all-boys school for troubled adolescents located in Chino Hills, California.

It was founded in 1907 by Margaret Fowler and modeled after the George Junior Republic in Pennsylvania. In 1909, Fowler purchased land and buildings of the Rancho Santa Ana del Chino to which the school relocated, the site later becoming part of Chino Hills.

As an adolescent, the actor Steve McQueen was remanded there. In later life, he was known to demand razors and jeans in his contracts so that he could donate them to the school.

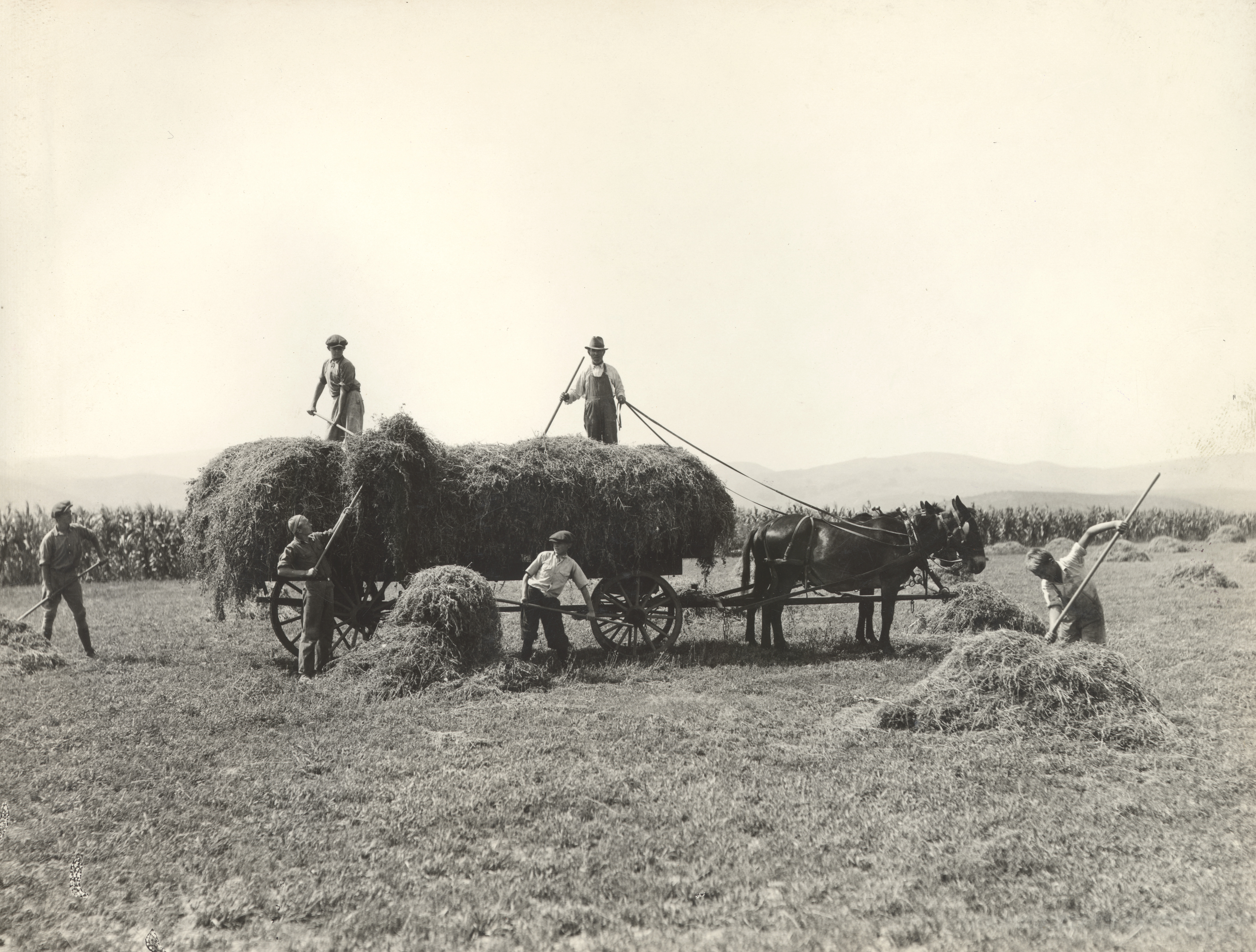
Boys Republic teens working on hay wagon, c. 1920

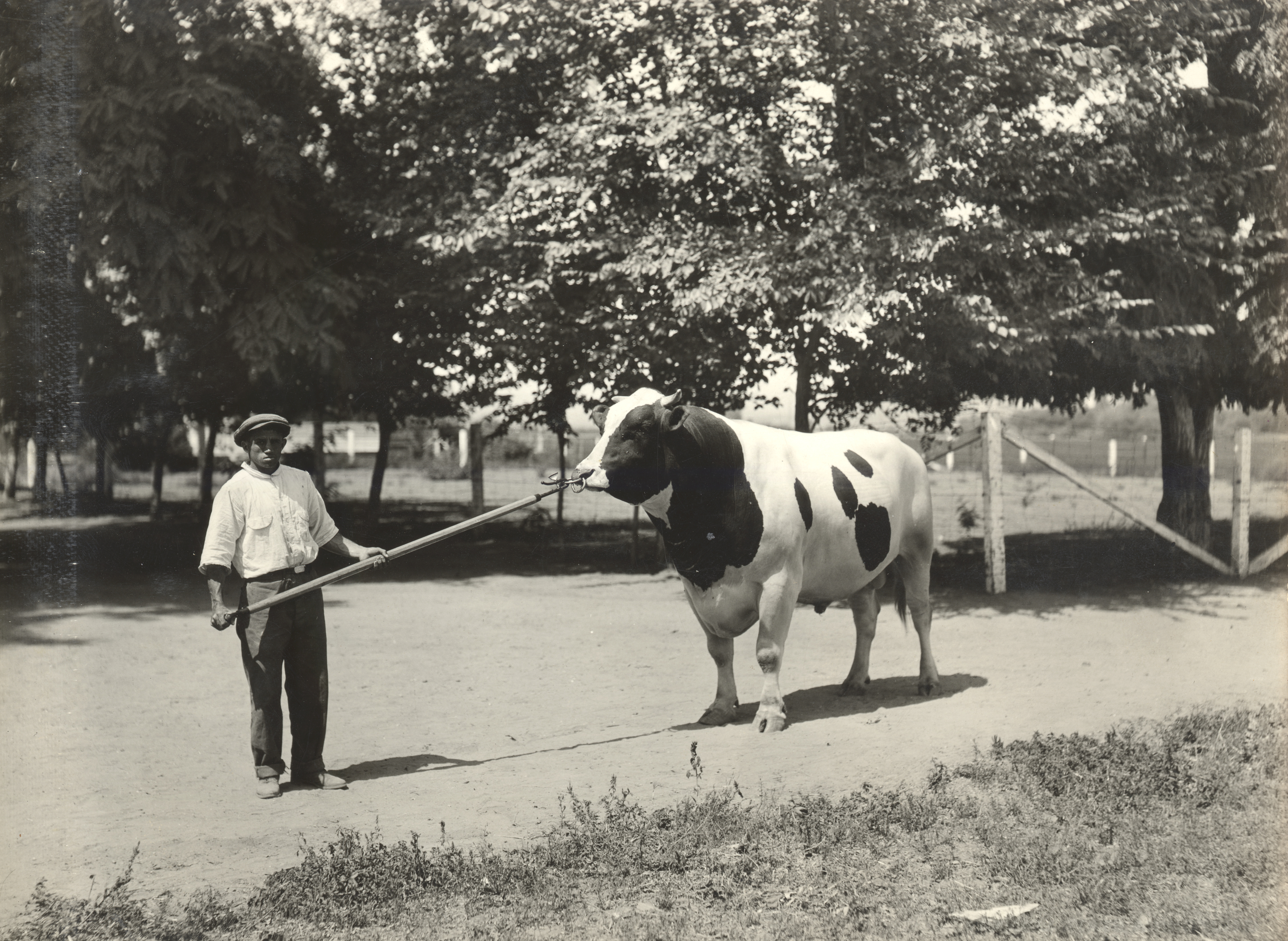
A teen holding a cow at Boys Republic, c. 1920

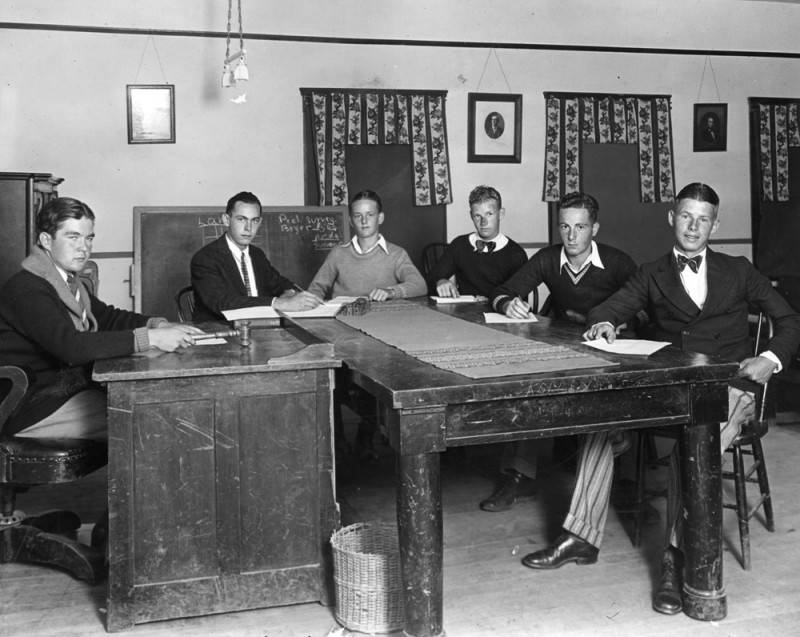
Council meeting at Boys Republic, 1929
