= Chino Hills High School =

Public high school in California, United States

Location
- 16150 Pomona Rincon Road; Chino Hills, California 91709; United States; 33°57′36″N 117°41′11″W

Information
- Type: Public high school secondary school
- Motto: Home of the Huskies
- Established: 2001 (25 years ago)
- School district: Chino Valley Unified School District
- NCES District ID: 0608460
- Superintendent: Norm Enfield
- NCES School ID: 060846010360
- Principal: Randal Buoncristiani
- Grades: 9–12
- Gender: Co-educational
- Enrollment: 2,767 (2023-2024)
- Hours in school day: 6hr 47min (Tuesday-Friday) 5hr 57min (Specific Mondays)
- Campus size: 38 acres (15 ha)
- Campus type: Suburban
- Colors: Navy, Green & Silver
- Athletics conference: California Interscholastic Federation (CIF)
- Sports: Football, cross country, tennis, volleyball, water polo, golf, basketball, soccer, wrestling, swimming, track and field, softball, marching band
- Mascot: Husky
- Nickname: Huskies
- Newspaper: The Husky Howler
- Feeder schools: Robert O. Townsend Junior High, Cal Aero Preserve Academy
- Website: chinohills.chino.k12.ca.us

Chino Hills High School, abbreviated CHHS, is located in Chino Hills, California, United States and is a four-year public comprehensive high school serving a student body from three cities in the Chino Valley Unified School District. The school was established in 2001 and is located in the City of Chino Hills, which is in the southwest corner of San Bernardino County. The City of Chino Hills was incorporated in 1991, and is now a community of 84,364. Chino Valley Unified School District serves over 29,000 students in Chino, Chino Hills, and south Ontario. The district employs over 2,600 people, and supports thirty-five schools including four comprehensive high schools and one continuation school.

The City of Chino Hills is in the midst of housing expansion, with multiple residential building projects under construction in the neighborhoods surrounding Chino Hills High School, and more homes under construction in neighboring Eastvale. This residential expansion is set to bring an enrollment increase to CHHS in the next several years. CHHS currently serves 2,891 students, whose student body reflects both ethnic and economic diversity. Although the CHHS attendance area covers the southern portions of the district's three cities, from the hills to the agricultural preserve, 90% of students who attend Chino Hills High School come from Chino Hills. CHHS is the largest high school in the district.

CHHS’ graduation rate was 95% in 2011 and 2012, increasing to 96% in 2013. This is above the district rate of 89% and the state rate of 80% in 2013. In 2013, the dropout rate at CHHS was 0.7%, down from 1.2% in 2011. This is lower than the district rate of 2%, the county rate of 4.2%, and the state rate of 3.9% in 2013. CHHS’ dropout rate is consistently less than district, county, and state totals.

== History ==
In the early 2000s, the Chino Hills area was growing at a very rapid rate. Nearby Ruben S. Ayala High School was nearing 4,000 students, and voters approved Measure M, a bond initiative to relieve overcrowding and build a second high school in Chino Hills. The first graduating class finished in 2005.

== Facilities ==
The campus was completed in 2006 and includes a 450-seat theater, a large stadium, two gymnasiums, and two computer labs. A wood shop is used for the theater set design class. Facilities also include designed-to-specification ceramics, video production, theater, band, cooking, an aquatics center, and art classrooms.

== Students ==
The student population is fairly diverse demographically and very diverse socioeconomically. Students come from some of the most wealthy and most disadvantaged areas in San Bernardino County. The demographic breakdown is as follows: 5% African American, 0.1% American Indian or Alaskan, 23% Asian, 41% Hispanic/Latino, .3% Pacific Islander, and 27% Caucasian, and 3% Multiple.

== Academics ==
Chino Hills High School offers 19 Advanced Placement courses, where 33% of students are enrolled. The school is attempting to reconfigure its scheduling so that more AP classes can be offered as a result of high demand.

- The 21 AP classes offered for the 2020-2021 school year are:

Four foreign languages are offered at Chino Hills High: Spanish (1, 2, 3H, 4 AP, 5 AP), French (1, 2, 3H, 4 AP), Japanese (1, 2, 3H, 4 AP), and Mandarin Chinese (1, 2, 3 H, 4AP). After graduation, approximately 59% attend a four-year university; 1% join the military, 3% attend technical college and 37% attend a community college.

== Extracurricular activities ==
The CHHS Dance Team is ranked as one of the top teams in the nation, breaking all-time high school dance team records multiple years in a row. In both 2017 and 2018, the Dance Team placed first in seven different dance categories at both the USA National Finals in Anaheim, CA, and the Contest of Champions Nationals in Orlando, Florida. In 2016, the team received 1st place in the Small Lyrical Championship Division at USA Nationals in Anaheim, CA. The team is also recognized for its 2016 hip-hop routine that won multiple awards at regional and state competitions and was performed at the CIF Varsity Boys Basketball game at the Honda Center.

The CHHS Spiritleaders have frequently made both US Spiritleaders and USA nationals. The 2008 Mascots are the only CHHS Spiritleading team to have medaled at the USA National Finals, taking 3rd in 2008. Students can also participate in many after-school variety sports, such as football, volleyball, wrestling, baseball, softball, boys' and girls' basketball, boys' and girls' water polo and swimming, boys' and girls' tennis, boys' and girls' golf, and track and field. CHHS Boys’ Basketball won the CIF State Championship in 2018.

Chino Hills High School has one of the best indoor percussion ensemble, competing in the WGI (Winter Guard International) Scholastic division. The school has won World Percussion championship titles in 2012, 2013, 2015, 2017, 2018, 2019, and 2024. The Chino Hills Percussion Ensemble has won the WGI Percussion Scholastic World Championships multiple times in Dayton, Ohio, holding the most gold medals in their division, with a total of 7 gold medals, and have never placed below second in 12 years. Their score in the 2017 finals (98.613) broke the record for highest score achieved in the history of the WGI Championships. The marching band program has won gold in the Western Band Association every year from 2017-2023 excluding 2020 during the pandemic.

== Performing arts ==
=== Indoor percussion ===
- 2012 WGI world championship gold
- 2013 WGI world championship gold
- 2015 WGI world championship gold
- 2017 WGI world championship gold
- 2019 WGI world championship gold
- 2024 WGI world championship gold

=== Marching band ===
- 2017 championship in the Southern California School Band and Orchestra Association 5A division (SCSBOA)

== Athletics ==
=== State championship ===
- 2016 CIF boys basketball Open Division state champion
- 2018 CIF boys basketball Division 1 state champion
- 2019 CIF boys basketball Division 1 state champion
- 2021 CIF girls volleyball Division 3 state champion

== Notable alumni ==
- Justin Alexander Cole (2005), NFL linebacker
- Kevin Guppy (2005), MLS player
- Chris Parmelee (2006), MLB player
- Zach Collier (2008), baseball outfielder, first round draft pick of the Philadelphia Phillies
- Cory Harkey (2008), NFL tight-end and coach
- Jaclyn Swedberg (2008), Miss April 2011 for Playboy Magazine Playmate of the Month for April 2011
- Ifomeno "Ifo" Ekpre-Olomu (2011), NFL cornerback
- Kyle Garlick (2011), MLB outfielder
- Bailey Falter (2015), MLB pitcher
- Lonzo Ball (2016), NBA player, #2 overall pick of the 2017 NBA draft
- LiAngelo Ball (2017), former basketball player who played professionally in the NBA G League and Liga Nacional de Baloncesto Profesional, now a rapper
- Eli Scott (2017), basketball player who played professionally in Slovakia
- DC the Don (2018), rapper
- LaMelo Ball (2019 - transferred), NBA player, 2021 NBA Rookie of the Year and All-Star
- Onyeka Okongwu (2019), NBA player, 2020 NBA Draft 6th overall pick
