= Egyptian Building (California) =

Building in California

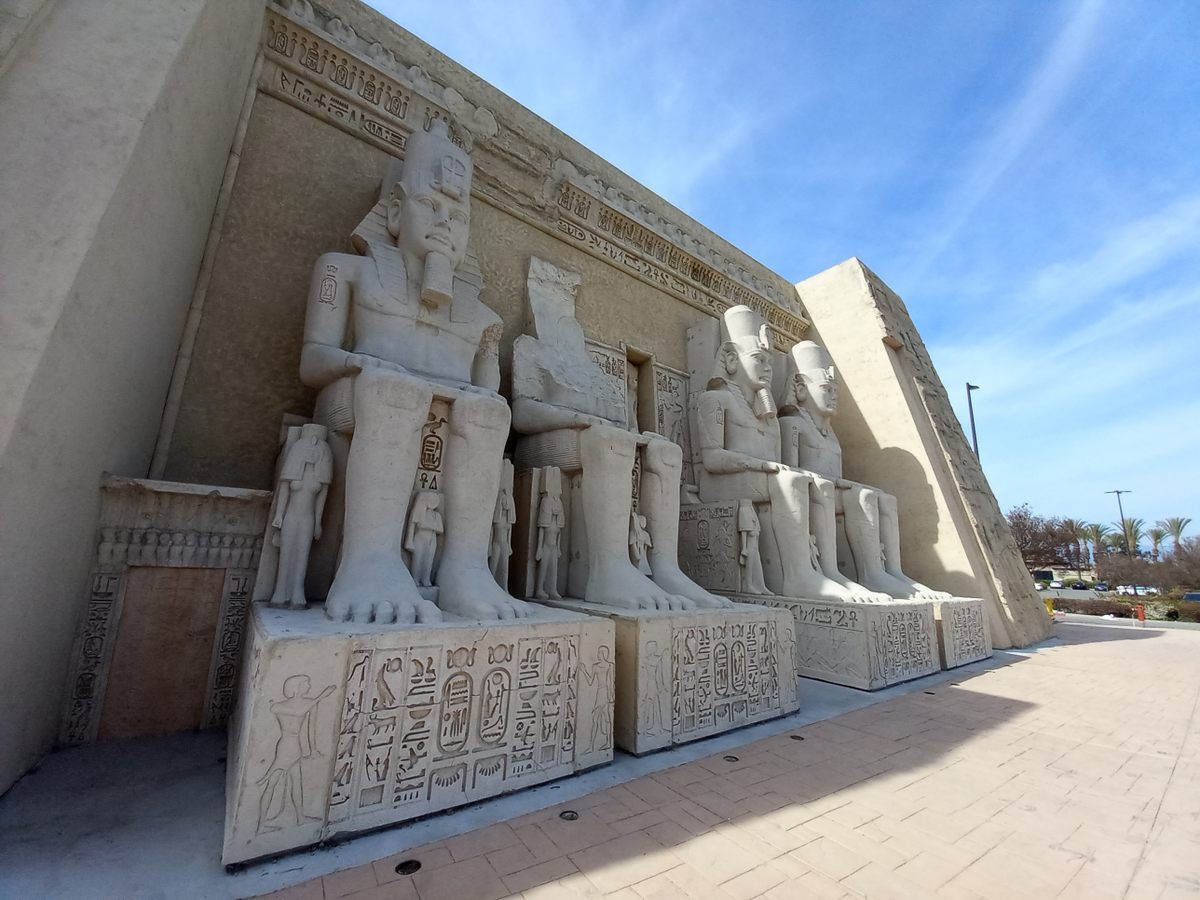

- Location within the Los Angeles metropolitan area Egyptian Building (California) (California) Egyptian Building (California) (the United States)

General information
- Architectural style: Egyptian Revival
- Location: 4525 Chino Hills Pkwy, Chino Hills, CA 91709
- Coordinates: 33.9812°N 117.7052°W
- Year built: 2019

Technical details
- Floor area: 5,945 sq ft (552.3 m^{2})

The Egyptian Building is a building in The Commons at Chino Hills, a small shopping mall in Chino Hills, California imitating the style of the temples of Abu Simbel in Egypt. It can be seen while driving on SR 71 and attracts tourists and locals alike.

== History ==
The building was constructed to hold the Egyptian restaurant Farou Food in 2019. It had planned to open in 2020, but the COVID-19 pandemic postponed the opening date to 2024. As of 2026, the restaurant has not opened.

== Description ==
The building was built to resemble the temples of Abu Simbel in Egypt on a smaller scale. It depicts Ramesses II, Nefertiti, and Hathor. The second statue from the left on the building's front is missing as a reference to the missing statue on the original temple, which had disappeared shortly after it was originally built. The building's interior is nonexistent as the COVID-19 pandemic hit before it was able to be finished. All four of the building's exterior sides, however, are completely detailed. The ceiling is glass and allows occupants to look at the sky. The materials for the building were only handmade in Egypt, so they had to be shipped over.
