= Chino Valley Unified School District (California) =

School district in California

Location
- 13461 Ramona Ave, Chino, California San Bernardino County United States
- Coordinates: 34°00′31″N 117°42′19″W

District information
- Type: Public
- Grades: K through 12
- Established: 1860
- Superintendent: Norm Enfield, Ed.D. (July 2018-Present)
- NCES District ID: 0608460

Students and staff
- Students: 25,513
- Teachers: 1098.85 FTE
- Staff: 1031.35 FTE

Other information
- Website: Chino Valley Unified School District

The Chino Valley Unified School District is a school district in San Bernardino County, California, United States. It serves the cities of Chino, Chino Hills, and the southwestern portion of Ontario, though originally it served only Chino when it was founded in 1860. It now encompasses 88 square miles (230 km^{2}) and serves about 26,000 students from grades kindergarten to 12th grade. As of the 2024-2025 school year, CVUSD comprises four high schools, five junior high schools, 20 elementary schools, one continuation school, one adult school, three K-8 schools (one of which is an optional school) & one charter school.

== District government ==
- Superintendent – Norm Enfield, Ed.D.

=== Board of education ===
Elections for the Chino Valley Unified School District Board of Education take place on a Tuesday after the first Monday in November of even-numbered years. The elections are plurality and by geographical district.

As of May 2026:

- President – Sonja Shaw (first elected in 2022, term ends in 2026)
- Vice President – John Cervantes (first elected in 2022, term ends in 2026)
- Clerk – Andrew Cruz (first elected in 2012, term ends in 2028)
- Member – James Na (first elected in 2008, term ends in 2028)
- Member – Shawn Smith (first elected in September 2025, term ends in 2026) (Note: Smith was elected in a special election to replace Jonathan Monroe, the previous board member who had resigned on August 7, 2025 due to him moving away from the area.)
- Student Member – Phoenix Kim (appointed in August 2025, term ends in 2026)

== Schools ==
The school year begins in early August and ends in May the week before the Memorial Day holiday every year.

High schools

- Chino High School, Chino
- Don Antonio Lugo High School, Chino
- Ruben S. Ayala High School, Chino Hills
- Chino Hills High School, Chino Hills

Alternative Schools

- Chino Valley Adult School, Chino
- Adult Education / Virtual School
- Boys Republic High School, Chino Hills
- Buena Vista Continuation High School, Chino
- Chino Valley Learning Academy

Junior High Schools

- Ramona, Chino
- Magnolia, Chino
- Robert O. Townsend, Chino Hills
- Woodcrest, Ontario
- Canyon Hills, Chino Hills

Fundamental Schools

- Anna A. Borba Fundamental (Elementary), Chino

Closed Schools (after 2008-2009)

- El Rancho, Chino (used by Oxford Preparatory Academy Chino from 2010 to 2016. Now used Alliegence Steam Academy Thrive Chino Valley)
- Richard Gird, Chino
- Los Serranos, Chino Hills

Charter Schools

- Alliegence Steam Academy Thrive Chino

Elementary Schools

- Newman, Chino
- E.J. Marshall, Chino
- Walnut Avenue, Chino
- Glenmeade, Chino Hills
- Alicia Cortez, Chino
- Doris Dickson, Chino
- Levi Dickey, Ontario
- Gerald F. Litel, Chino Hills
- Eagle Canyon, Chino Hills
- Oak Ridge, Chino Hills
- Howard Cattle, Chino
- Rolling Ridge, Chino Hills
- Butterfield Ranch, Chino Hills
- Country Springs, Chino Hills
- Hidden Trails, Chino Hills
- Michael G. Wickman, Chino Hills
- Edwin Rhodes, Chino
- Liberty, Ontario
- Chaparral, Chino Hills

K-8 Schools

- Cal Aero Preserve Academy, Chino
- Lyle S. Briggs Elementary / Jr. High Fundamental, Chino
- Legacy Academy, Chino

== Controversies ==
=== First Amendment issues ===
In July 2010, the CVUSD approved a resolution to introduce "Bible as Literature and History" courses at its four high schools, based on a curricula provided by the local Calvary Chapel Chino Hills church and the textbook The Bible and its Influence, written by Christian Evangelical educational political activist Charles Stetson.

On November 11, 2014, the Freedom From Religion Foundation filed a federal lawsuit against the Board claiming violations of the US and California Constitutions. Although the suit alleged that all of the Board members regularly participated in religious proselytizing, James Na, was singled out as a prime violator of religious neutrality during the meetings, regularly including Christian and Biblical references into many of his official statements. The suit alleges at one recent Board meeting, Na "urged everyone who does not know Jesus Christ to go and find Him," and closed the meeting with a reading of Psalm 143. On February 18, 2016, U.S. District Judge Jesus Bernal made a ruling on the FFRF lawsuit, ordering the Board to stop reciting prayers, Bible readings, and proselytizing during school board meetings. On March 4, 2016, the school board voted 3-2 in favor of appealing the ruling.

On November 3, 2016, the Board changed their policies to explicitly state when board members can and cannot express their faith during meetings. On July 25, 2018, a three-judge panel of the United States Court of Appeals for the Ninth Circuit unanimously affirmed the District Court's ruling, holding that the "policy and practice of prayer at Chino Valley Board meetings violates the Establishment Clause."

=== School closures ===
On March 5, 2009, the Chino Valley Unified School District Board of Education voted 4 to 1 vote to approve a budget reduction plan which included the closure of El Rancho Elementary School and Richard Gird Elementary School, both in Chino, and Los Serranos Elementary School in Chino Hills. Ms. Sylvia Orozco, Board President, Mr. William Klein, Vice President, Mr. Fred Youngblood, Clerk and Mr. James Na, Board member all voted in favor of the budget reduction plan based on the recommendations of the Chino Valley Unified School District Superintendent, Dr. Edmond T. Heatley. Mr. Michael Calta, Board member was the dissenting vote. These three schools were closed at the end of the 2008/2009 school year and their students were reassigned to other schools in the District.

The process in which these schools were selected to be closed were alleged to violate California Education Code 17387, which states, "It is the intent of the Legislature to have the community involved before decisions are made about school closure or the use of surplus space, thus avoiding community conflict and assuring building use that is compatible with the community's needs and desires". Charges were made against the Board of racial / national origin motivations in choosing the schools that they did close.

A complaint was issued with the US Department of Education Office for Civil Rights regarding the nature and process followed for these school closings. On June 29, 2012, the OCR closed its investigation and released its final report of its findings of the allegations. The report found that, while there were good budgetary reasons for the District to be closing schools at this time, the process used to do so was ad-hoc and disorganized, and appeared to rely principally on the opinions of the District Superintendent with little documentation, public input or transparency. In response, the CVUSD agreed with the OCR's findings and adopted new formal policies for school closure which provided greater transparency and public input into the process.
