= Chino Hills, California =

City in California, United States

- City
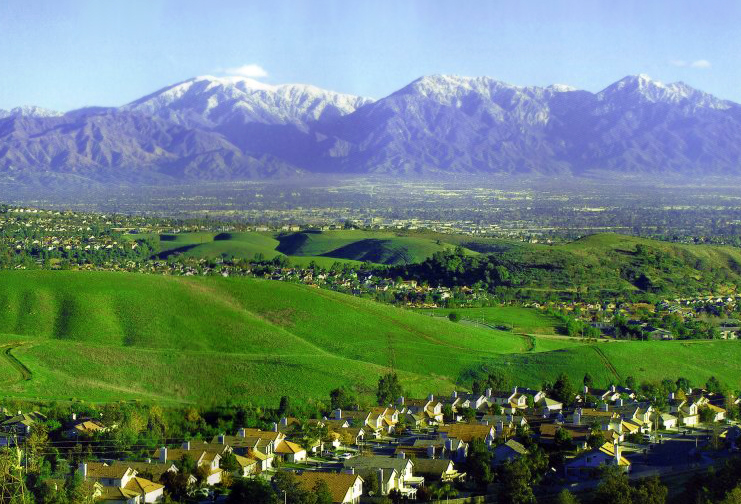
- Chino Hills, with the San Gabriel Mountains in background

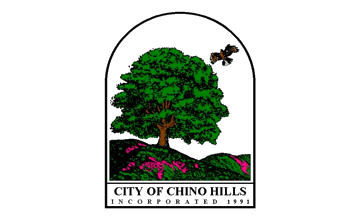
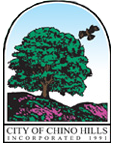
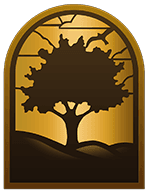
- Flag Seal Logo
- Interactive map of Chino Hills, California
- Location in the United States
- Coordinates: 33°59′38″N 117°45′32″W
- Country: United States
- State: California
- County: San Bernardino
- Incorporated (city): December 1, 1991

Government
  - Type: Council-Manager
  - Mayor: Art Bennett

Area
  - Total: 44.70 sq mi (115.77 km^{2})
  - Land: 44.65 sq mi (115.64 km^{2})
  - Water: 0.046 sq mi (0.12 km^{2}) 0.15%
- Elevation: 860 ft (262 m)

Population (2020)
  - Total: 78,411
  - Estimate (2024): 77,418
  - Rank: 10th in San Bernardino County; 116th in California
  - Density: 1,756.1/sq mi (678.05/km^{2})
- Time zone: UTC-8 (Pacific)
  - Summer (DST): UTC-7 (PDT)
- ZIP code: 91709
- Area codes: 909, 657/714
- FIPS code: 06-13214
- GNIS feature IDs: 1668255, 2409454
- Website: www.chinohills.org

Chino Hills (/ˈtʃiːnoʊ/ CHEE-noh; chino being Spanish for 'curly') is a city in the western end of the Inland Empire region of San Bernardino County, California. As of the 2020 census, Chino Hills had a population of 78,411.

== History ==
=== Indigenous ===
Prior to the colonization of the area by the Spanish Empire in the late 18th century, the Tongva village of Wapijanga (submerged by the building of the Prado Dam in 1941) was the major point of influence in what would later become Chino Hills. The village was an important point of connection between the Tongva and the Serrano. Another Tongva village, Pasinogna, was also located in present day Chino Hills

=== Spanish & Mexican ===
After the Spanish founded Mission San Gabriel in 1771, the Chino Hills area was used as spillover grazing pasture by mission cattle and horses. In 1841, the area was part of a land concession given to Antonio Maria Lugo, and became known as Rancho Santa Ana del Chino. In 1846, the Battle of Chino, a notable battle of the Mexican-American War was fought on a battlefield in Chino Hills. After Mexico ceded California to the United States in 1848, the land continued to be used for cattle ranching.

=== American ===
In 1848, the California gold rush began in Northern California. Meanwhile, in Southern California, cattle ranchers made fortunes in the beef trade, feeding the influx of migrants. In 1858, Chino Hills became one of the stagecoach stations of the Butterfield Overland Mail. In 1881, the land was sold to Richard Gird, a miner from Tombstone, Arizona, who had plans to develop the land. In 1893, after being impacted by economic depression, Gird was forced to sell the land to a group of real estate investors who developed the town of Chino, which was incorporated in 1910. Around this time, a resort was opened at La Vida Mineral Springs in Carbon Canyon, in the modern-day Sleepy Hollow region of the city. In 1925, the Los Serranos Country Club opened. The area became a destination for both tourists and bootleggers during the prohibition era because of its relative isolation. For the same reason, Sleepy Hollow became a destination for hippies and artists during the 1960s. As Southern California grew, suburban housing began replacing farmlands. Developers targeted Chino Hills for its scenic views and proximity to L.A. and Orange counties. During the late 1980s, the area experienced a surge of development, and an incorporation effort began. In 1991, the city of Chino Hills was incorporated with a population of 42,000.

== Geography ==
Chino Hills, California

Climate chart (precipitation, max. and min. temperature)
J	F	M	A	M	J	J	A	S	O	N	D
4 68 41	4.1 69 44	3.5 69 45	0.7 74 47	0.3 76 51	0.1 82 55	0 89 59	0.1 89 59	0.3 87 58	0.7 80 53	1.3 73 45	2 68 41
- █ Average max. and min. temperatures in °F
- █ Precipitation totals in inches
- Source: Weather.com / NWS
Metric conversion
J	F	M	A	M	J	J	A	S	O	N	D
102 20 5	103 21 7	88 21 7	19 23 8	6.4 24 11	1.3 28 13	0 32 15	3.3 32 15	7.4 31 14	17 27 12	33 23 7	52 20 5
- █ Average max. and min. temperatures in °C
- █ Precipitation totals in mm

Chino Hills is a part of the Chino Valley. According to the United States Census Bureau, the city has a total area of 44.8 square miles (116 km^{2}), much of which is undeveloped rolling hills, including the Chino Hills State Park. 44.7 square miles (116 km^{2}) of it is land and 0.1 square miles (0.26 km^{2}) of it (0.15%) is water.

=== Development ===
Due to its topography of rolling hills, Chino Hills was primarily rural prior to the mid-1970s; most land was utilized for equestrian purposes and for dairies, except for the multi-use purposes of the State of California, promoting jobs for the community through day labor from the Chino Institute for Men on Central Avenue. Rapid and extensive housing developments followed throughout the 1980s and early 1990s, only slowing down in recent years. Most neighborhoods are arranged in a village-type format with strategically placed shopping centers and parks designed to be within walking distance of nearby homes. The Vellano Country Club, a private golf course and housing development, was designed by golf champion Greg Norman, his first project in the Greater Los Angeles area. Chino Hills also includes the developed golf course development neighborhood of Los Serranos. Other large master-planned subdivisions include Woodview/Village Crossing, Gordon Ranch, LaBand Village, Butterfield Ranch, Rolling Ridge, Fairfield Ranch, and Payne Ranch.

=== Layout ===
The city of Chino Hills is bounded by the Los Angeles County cities of Pomona and Diamond Bar to the north and to the northwest, the Los Angeles County unincorporated area of South Diamond Bar to the west, the San Bernardino County city of Chino to the east, unincorporated Riverside County near Corona to the southeast, and the Orange County cities of Brea and Yorba Linda to the west and southwest, respectively, as well as an unincorporated area of Orange County between Brea and Yorba Linda and a small unincorporated area between Yorba Linda and Anaheim, to the southwest and south, respectively.

The eastern border of Chino Hills roughly follows the Chino Valley Freeway (SR 71), which offers access to the Pomona Freeway (SR 60) to the north and the Riverside Freeway (SR 91) to the south. Undeveloped hills form the western border, which also serves as the San Bernardino – Orange County line. Because this area is mostly undeveloped, there is only one road directly connecting Chino Hills and Orange County, Carbon Canyon Road (SR 142), which is long, winding, and prone to landslides.

=== Faults ===
Chino Hills is situated near several significant fault lines due to its position within the complex tectonic setting of the San Andreas Fault system. The most prominent faults in the area include:

1. Chino Fault: This fault runs along the eastern edge of the Chino Hills, extending from Corona to the Los Serranos area.
2. Whittier Fault: Located to the west of Chino Hills,
3. Yorba Linda Fault (Yorba Linda Trend): This lesser-known fault identified in the 1990s transects the Whittier Fault and extends into the southeastern portion of Chino Hills.
4. Additionally, there are other active faults in the broader region, including the Elsinore Fault Zone, which runs from the Peninsular Ranges northwest to the Chino Hills range.

These faults contribute to the seismic activity in the region, such as the 2008 Chino Hills earthquake, with a magnitude of 5.4, attributed to pressure at the intersection of the Chino and Whittier faults. The earthquake was felt as far south as San Diego and as far north as Las Vegas.

=== Wildfires ===
Chino Hills, California, has experienced several significant wildfires, including the Freeway Complex Fire and Canyon Fire, primarily due to dry conditions, strong winds, and dense vegetation. These events have led to increased awareness and preparedness efforts in Chino Hills and surrounding communities. Residents are encouraged to create defensible spaces around their properties, maintain fire-resistant landscaping, and stay informed about local fire conditions, especially during peak wildfire seasons.

== Demographics ==
Historical population
Census	Pop.	Note	%±
1990	27,608		—
2000	66,787		141.9%
2010	74,799		12.0%
2020	78,411		4.8%
U.S. Decennial Census

=== Racial and ethnic composition ===
Chino Hills city, California – Racial and ethnic composition Note: the US Census treats Hispanic/Latino as an ethnic category. This table excludes Latinos from the racial categories and assigns them to a separate category. Hispanics/Latinos may be of any race.
Race / Ethnicity (NH = Non-Hispanic)	Pop 2000	Pop 2010	Pop 2020	% 2000	% 2010	% 2020
White alone (NH)	29,247	25,017	18,465	43.79%	33.45%	23.55%
Black or African American alone (NH)	3,573	3,225	3,116	5.35%	4.31%	3.97%
Native American or Alaska Native alone (NH)	195	143	126	0.29%	0.19%	0.16%
Asian alone (NH)	14,575	22,351	31,417	21.82%	29.88%	40.07%
Native Hawaiian or Pacific Islander alone (NH)	72	99	125	0.11%	0.13%	0.16%
Other race alone (NH)	143	180	377	0.21%	0.24%	0.48%
Mixed race or Multiracial (NH)	1,831	1,982	2,701	2.74%	2.65%	3.44%
Hispanic or Latino (any race)	17,151	21,802	22,084	25.68%	29.15%	28.16%
Total	66,787	74,799	78,411	100.00%	100.00%	100.00%

=== 2020 census ===
As of the 2020 census, Chino Hills had a population of 78,411. The population density was 1,756.1 inhabitants per square mile (678.0/km^{2}). The median age was 39.5 years. 21.7% of residents were under the age of 18 and 12.9% were 65 years of age or older. The age distribution was 9.8% aged 18 to 24, 25.7% aged 25 to 44, and 30.0% aged 45 to 64. For every 100 females, there were 96.3 males, and for every 100 females age 18 and over there were 93.9 males age 18 and over.

The census reported that 99.7% of the population lived in households, 0.2% lived in non-institutionalized group quarters, and 0.1% were institutionalized. 97.0% of residents lived in urban areas, while 3.0% lived in rural areas.

There were 25,258 households, of which 38.9% had children under the age of 18 living in them. Of all households, 64.4% were married-couple households, 4.5% were cohabiting couple households, 12.3% had a male householder with no spouse or partner present, and 18.8% had a female householder with no spouse or partner present. About 13.1% of all households were made up of individuals and 4.4% had someone living alone who was 65 years of age or older. The average household size was 3.1. There were 20,784 families (82.3% of all households).

There were 26,068 housing units at an average density of 583.8 units per square mile (225.4 units/km^{2}), of which 25,258 (96.9%) were occupied. Of occupied units, 71.6% were owner-occupied and 28.4% were occupied by renters. The homeowner vacancy rate was 0.7% and the rental vacancy rate was 4.7%.

Racial composition as of the 2020 census
Race	Number	Percent
White	22,746	29.0%
Black or African American	3,308	4.2%
American Indian and Alaska Native	598	0.8%
Asian	31,780	40.5%
Native Hawaiian and Other Pacific Islander	144	0.2%
Some other race	8,832	11.3%
Two or more races	11,003	14.0%

=== 2023 estimate ===
In 2023, the US Census Bureau estimated that the median household income was $122,600, and the per capita income was $49,460. About 4.5% of families and 6.9% of the population were below the poverty line.

=== 2010 census ===
The 2010 United States census reported that Chino Hills had a population of 74,799. The population density was 1,671.5 inhabitants per square mile (645.4/km^{2}). The racial makeup of Chino Hills was 38,035 (50.8%) White (33.4% Non-Hispanic White), 3,415 (4.6%) African American, 379 (0.5%) Native American, 22,676 (30.3%) Asian, 115 (0.2%) Pacific Islander, 6,520 (8.7%) from other races, and 3,659 (4.9%) from two or more races. Hispanic or Latino of any race were 21,802 persons (29.1%).

The Census reported that 74,644 people (99.8% of the population) lived in households, 8 (0%) lived in non-institutionalized group quarters, and 147 (0.2%) were institutionalized.

There were 22,941 households, out of which 11,026 (48.1%) had children under the age of 18 living in them, 15,840 (69.0%) were opposite-sex married couples living together, 2,381 (10.4%) had a female householder with no husband present, 1,101 (4.8%) had a male householder with no wife present. There were 834 (3.6%) unmarried opposite-sex partnerships, and 142 (0.6%) same-sex married couples or partnerships. 2,713 households (11.8%) were made up of individuals, and 717 (3.1%) had someone living alone who was 65 years of age or older. The average household size was 3.25. There were 19,322 families (84.2% of all households); the average family size was 3.54.

The population was spread out, with 20,291 people (27.1%) under the age of 18, 7,147 people (9.6%) aged 18 to 24, 20,207 people (27.0%) aged 25 to 44, 21,889 people (29.3%) aged 45 to 64, and 5,265 people (7.0%) who were 65 years of age or older. The median age was 36.6 years. For every 100 females, there were 97.7 males. For every 100 females age 18 and over, there were 94.7 males.

There were 23,617 housing units at an average density of 527.8 per square mile (203.8/km^{2}), of which 18,421 (80.3%) were owner-occupied, and 4,520 (19.7%) were occupied by renters. The homeowner vacancy rate was 1.0%; the rental vacancy rate was 5.4%. 61,152 people (81.8% of the population) lived in owner-occupied housing units and 13,492 people (18.0%) lived in rental housing units. The median household income was $106,099 and the mean household income was $122,788. For families, the median income was $109,106 and the mean was $127,755.

== Economy ==
=== Top employers ===
According to the city's 2020 Comprehensive Annual Financial Report, the top employers in the city are:

#	Employer	# of Employees
1	Chino Valley Unified School District	3,350
2	Costco	340
3	Lowe's	265
4	Boys Republic	264
5	City of Chino Hills	229
6	Albertsons	226
7	Kaiser Permanente Laboratory	220
8	Chino Valley Fire District	140
9	99 Ranch Market	124
10	Harkins Theaters	123

== Arts and culture ==
=== Landmarks ===
- BAPS Shri Swaminarayan Mandir Chino Hills
- The Egyptian Building, a building imitating ancient Egyptian architecture whilst housing a restaurant, is located in the city.

=== In Media ===
- The hit song 2 of Amerikaz Most Wanted by Tupac Shakur and Snoop Dogg says, "I've got a house out in the hills, right next to Chino."
- South Park episode "Stunning and Brave" has a character state they are from Chino Hills
- Chino Hills has served as a filming location for numerous films and tv shows, including 2006 comedy movie The Benchwarmers
- The area was the fictionalized location of the initial Martian spacecraft's landing in 1953's The War of the Worlds. In the film, Pastor Collins, a resident of nearby Corona, California, refers to the meteor as having landed "halfway to Pomona". Subsequent geographical references by Colonel Heffner indicate the landing place as somewhere near "Carbon Canyon".

== Parks and recreation ==
The city of Chino Hills has 44 municipal parks. One such example is Overlook Park, which spans 1.5 acres (0.61 ha) and features scenic views of the Pomona Valley, Chino Hills, and San Gabriel Mountains. It has picnic tables, barbecue grills, and a seating area.

Chino Hills State Park has 60 miles (100 km) of trails and fire roads also offer opportunities for viewing wildlife and native plants. Facilities consist of a picnic area, camping sites, equestrian staging area and corrals, a historic barn, water and restrooms.

== Government ==
=== Local ===
Chino Hills follows the Council-Manager model of government. The city is governed by a city council which establishes all city ordinances, approves plans, adopts budgets, etc. The council appoints the city manager who enforces laws and, in essence, runs the city's day-to-day operations.

==== City council ====
The city council is elected by city residents and, within the council, rotates the position of mayor. Once elected, the city council members serve a four-year term. The five city council members meet on the second and fourth Tuesday of each month, with opportunity for residents to voice their opinion during the open forum. The meetings are broadcast via the city's television station and streaming via the city's website.

The current mayor and council members are:

- Mayor: Art Bennett
- Vice mayor: Brian Johsz
- Council Members: Ray Marquez, Cynthia Moran, and Peter Rogers

==== Mayors ====
The City Council selects one member to serve as Mayor for a one-year term. This is a list of Chino Hills mayors by year.

List of Mayors
Year	Name
2009	Peter Rogers
2012	Art Bennett
2013	Peter Rogers
2015	Cynthia Moran
2016	Art Bennett
2017	Ray Marquez
2018	Peter Rogers
2019	Cynthia Moran
2020	Art Bennett
2021	Brian Johsz
2022	Peter Rogers
2023	Cynthia Moran

=== State and federal representation ===
Chino Hills' most pro-Republican areas are in the southern and eastern regions.

In the state legislature following the 2020 elections, Chino Hills is located in the 32nd Senate District, represented by Republican Kelly Seyarto, and in the 59th Assembly District, represented by Republican Phillip Chen.

In the United States House of Representatives, Chino Hills is split between California's 35th congressional district, represented by Democrat Norma Torres, and California's 40th congressional district, represented by Republican Young Kim.

== Education ==
Chino Hills is served by the Chino Valley Unified School District.

=== Elementary schools ===
- Hidden Trails
- Country Springs
- Eagle Canyon
- Oak Ridge
- Butterfield Ranch
- Michael G. Wickman
- Chaparral
- Gerald F. Litel
- Glenmeade
- Rolling Ridge
- Edwin Rhodes

=== Junior high schools ===
- Canyon Hills Junior High
- Robert O. Townsend Junior High

=== High schools ===
- Ruben S. Ayala High School
- Chino Hills High School

=== Independent schools ===
- Loving Savior of the Hills
- Chino Hills Christian School
- Chino Hills Montessori School
- Boys Republic

=== Charter schools ===
- Mirus Secondary School
- Sycamore Academy of Science and Cultural Arts

== Infrastructure ==
=== Police and fire ===
Law enforcement services in Chino Hills are provided by the San Bernardino County Sheriff's Department. The Chief of Police is Sheriff’s Captain Garth Goodell. Chino Hills has contracted with the sheriff's department for law enforcement services since its incorporation in 1991.

The city contracts with the Chino Valley Independent Fire District (CVIFD) for fire protection services. The CVIFD serves the Chino Valley, serving Chino Hills and the city of Chino. The CVIFD is a separate political entity from either Chino Hills or Chino and is managed by its own elected board. The department has three stations located throughout Chino Hills.

=== Transportation ===
==== Local highways ====
- State Route 60
- State Route 71
- State Route 91
- State Route 142

==== Public transportation ====
Chino Hills is served by Omnitrans' OmniLink demand-response service open to the general public. For $2.50 each way, one can travel throughout the city and transfer for free to the Omnitrans public bus at the Chino Hills Marketplace and the Chino Hills Civic Center. The dial-a-ride service operates five days a week, mostly during daytime hours.

== Notable people ==
- Clarence Ray Allen - Criminal
- LaMelo Ball - NBA player
- LaVar Ball - Businessman, Former NFL Player
- LiAngelo Ball - Basketball player and rapper
- Lonzo Ball - NBA player
- Alex Bengard - Soccer player
- Aaron Cervantes - Soccer player
- Zach Collier - Baseball Player
- Kevin Cooper - Prisoner
- Rebekah Gardner - Basketball Player
- Cory Harkey - Former NFL Player
- Mike Harkey - Former MLB Player
- Danny Lopez - Hall of Fame boxer
- Steve McQueen - Actor (Spent teen years at Boys Republic)
- Ricky Minor - American Idol music director
- Mat Mladin - AMA Superbike champion
- Tracy Murray - A retired NBA Champion
- Onyeka Okongwu - NBA player
- Leah O'Brien-Amico - U.S. Olympic softball group gold medalist
- Tony Pedregon - NHRA Funny Car champion
- Rafael Pérez - former LAPD officer, convicted in relation to the Rampart scandal
- Mike Randolph - Los Angeles Galaxy soccer player
- Makenzy Robbe - soccer player for the Houston Dash
- Ron Roenicke - MLB player and manager
- Eli Scott - Basketball Player
- Brianne Tju - actress
- Tyler Wilson - soccer player
- Del Worsham - NHRA Funny Car driver

== See also ==
- Rancho Santa Ana del Chino
- Prado Dam
- Los Serranos
- BAPS Shri Swaminarayan Mandir Chino Hills
- The Shops at Chino Hills
