= Una Abell-Brinker =

American actress

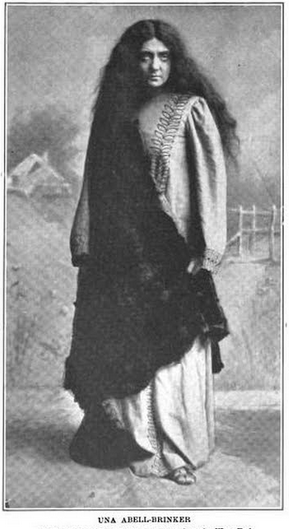
- Abell-Brinker as Kundry in Parsifal, from a 1904 publication
- Born: Una Abell; August 16, 1874; Wayne, Michigan, U.S.
- Died: November 12, 1952 (aged 78)
- Occupation: Actress
- Spouses: H. Coulter Brinker; Jacob H. Kahn
- Children: 2

Una Abell-Brinker (August 16, 1874 – November 12, 1952) was an American actress, billed as "First Lady of the Newark Theatre."

== Early life ==
Una Abell was born in Wayne, Michigan, the daughter of Oliver Clinton Abell and Mary E. Chase Abell. Her father served in the Michigan State Senate in 1867; her mother worked as a fraternity matron at the University of Michigan. As a girl she recited to entertain a reunion of Civil War veterans in Akron, Ohio.

== Career ==
Abell began her professional stage career by 1892, as an ingenue in the Hortense Rhéa company. She appeared in shows with Helena Modjeska, Sarah Bernhardt, and Maurice Barrymore, before launching her own repertory company at the New Century Theater in Newark, New Jersey.

She took a few years away from the stage, and returned to vaudeville in 1909, in Edward Weitzel's The Fifth Act. In 1910 she presented Ullie Akerstrom's The Eleventh Hour in Newark, where a reviewer noted, "The part deprives Mrs. Brinker of displaying some of her beautiful gowns, but gives her every opportunity for acting, which she does in a most artistic manner." She was billed as "the First Lady of Newark Theatre."

Abell-Brinker adapted and translated The Typhoon, a sketch by Melchior Lengyel, in 1912, but another playwright, Emil Nyitray, claimed that her version was his own, and she was arrested to prevent its performance. She was also founder of the Junior League of Pleasantville, New York.

== Personal life ==
Una Abell married H. Coulter Brinker, a fellow actor, in 1899; she was widowed in 1900, when Brinker died in an accidental fall from a hotel window. Her mother died a few months later. Her second husband was theatrical producer Jacob H. Kahn. She had two daughters, Joan Goldberg and Holly Becker. She was widowed again in 1944. Una Abell Brinker died in 1952, aged 78 years. Her papers are archived at the New York Public Library.
