= John Blocki =

American perfumer (1845–1934)

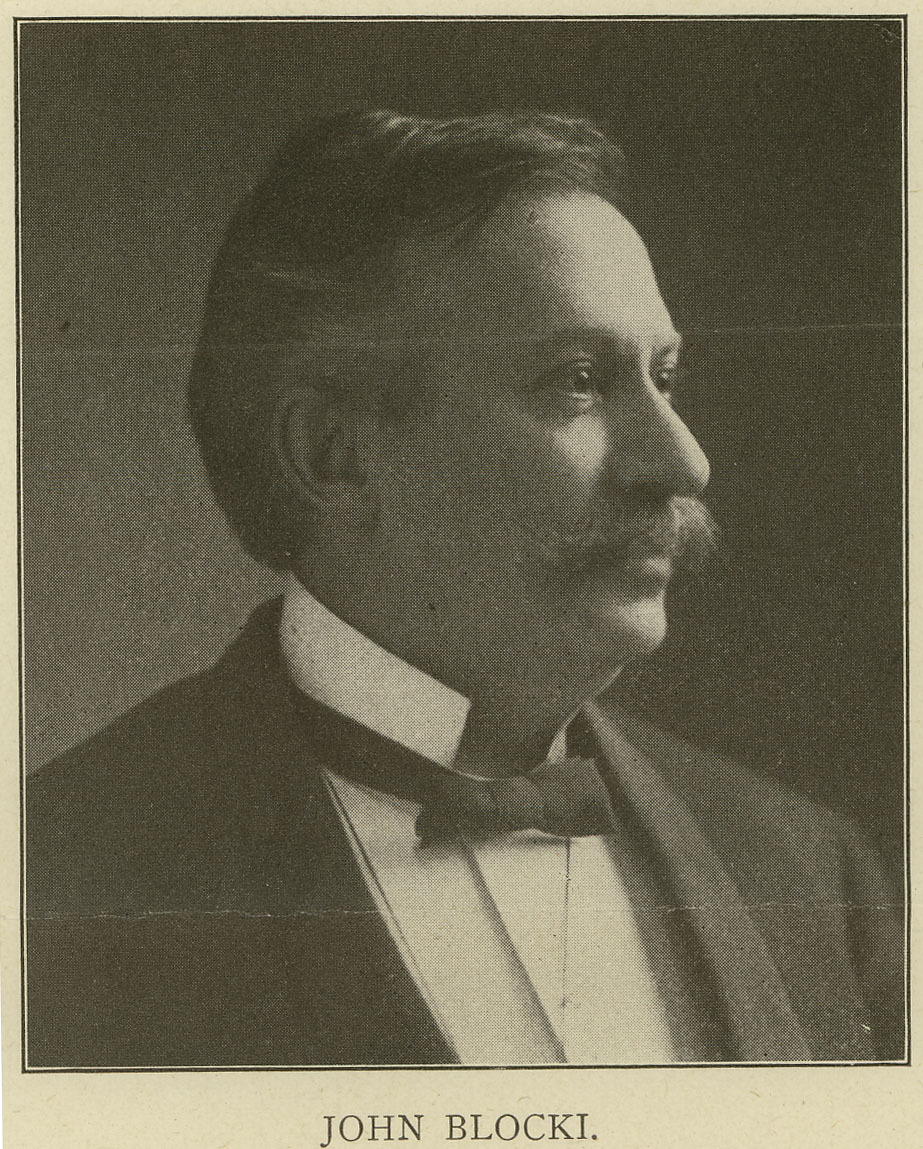
- Born: June 15, 1845; Hansewalde, Prussia
- Died: May 7, 1934 (aged 88); Chicago, Illinois, USA
- Occupation: perfumer
- Known for: flower-in-the-bottle floral waters and perfumes

John Blocki (15 June 1845 – 7 May 1934) was an American perfumer. His perfumes and cosmetics were widely sold and his unique presentation earned him a U.S. patent for perfumery packaging.

== Early life and family ==
John Blocki was born on a feudal estate near Königsberg, Prussia in 1845. His parents were Friedrich Wilhelm Blocki, a Prussian and Polish noble, and Emma Blocki (née Doehling) of Pomerania. In 1850, the Blockis with their six sons, two daughters, tutor, governess and several servants left the turbulence in Prussia for America.

The voyage took six weeks and ended in a shipwreck off the shore of Sheboygan, Wisconsin where the family decided to settle. The only item salvaged from the shipwreck was a piano. It was the first piano in the state and people would come from miles around to hear Emma Blocki play on Sundays.

Blocki was educated in the public and private schools in Wisconsin and afterwards moved to Chicago where he lived the rest of his life. He married an English woman, Emma Leadbeater, in 1867. They had two children, Frederick William and Jeanette (a twin, Irene, died very young).

== Chemist and perfumer ==
In 1859 when he was fourteen years old, Blocki apprenticed as a chemist with pharmacist F.A. Wheeler in Sheboygan. Blocki's older brother, William, had moved to Chicago to begin his pharmacy career as a clerk for Edwin Oscar Gale; the Gale drugstore was founded in 1847 making it one of the oldest apothecaries in Chicago. William Blocki became a full partner in the business which changed its name to Gale & Blocki and grew to several stores including a prime location in the historic Palmer House Hotel (now the Palmer House Hilton).

Blocki moved to Chicago in 1862 and joined the drug firm of Fuller, French and Fuller; this was his first and only employer. On August 12, 1865, at the age of twenty, Blocki established his own retail and wholesale drug firm known as Blocki, Dietzsche & Co. The firm specialized in high quality chemicals, perfumes, essences and essential oils. The business was destroyed by the Great Chicago Fire of 1871 but quickly reopened at a new location in one of the few surviving business buildings in the city.

Having accomplished himself as a chemist, Blocki sharpened his business skills by calling on large retailers in a wholesale capacity. From 1885 to 1895 he was appointed to represent the old New York house of Lehn & Fink in Chicago and vicinity. This endeavor was a success and Blocki became known as one of the best wholesale druggists in the country for his unusually strong ability to memorize market quotations.

Early in his career, Blocki began to specialize in perfumes and toilet waters. He gained a local reputation in Chicago for the excellence of his fragrance creations and opened a shop on Michigan Avenue for the exclusive sale of perfumery. The perfume shop was connected to his laboratory. This was the first and only retail perfume store in Chicago at the time and eventually it had to be relocated to a larger space owing to its success.

In 1895, Blocki and his son, Frederick, dropped the drug and chemical aspects of the business and focused entirely on creating and manufacturing perfumes and toiletries. The firm was named John Blocki & Son and it produced hundreds of fine perfumes and toiletries that were used by millions. They formulated and manufactured products under the Blocki name and also for several other beauty brands, including the Franco American Hygienic Co. The father-son partnership met an untimely and unexpected end in 1919 when Frederick Blocki died of pneumonia due to the influenza epidemic of 1918-1919.

In addition to being a trained chemist and perfumer like his father, Frederick was a politician having served as Commissioner of Public Works and City Treasurer during Chicago's formative years. He was well respected for his management of city finances and for actions such as lending the city money from his own account to pay police and firemen before Christmas. Fred Blocki supervised some of the city's great public improvements, including construction of the first fixed trunnion bascule bridge in the United States, the Cortland Street Drawbridge.

After Frederick Blocki's death, the firm was renamed John Blocki, Inc. and it continued to produce perfumes and toiletries for many years. Blocki died on May 7, 1934, at the age of eighty eight having been active in his business up to the end. He is buried in a family memorial room in the mausoleum at Rosehill Cemetery; a Victorian era cemetery that is the burial place of many well-known early Chicagoans. Blocki's daughter, Jeannette Peterson, operated the perfume company after his death but soon sold it to the Winter Group who eventually closed the business.

== Industry advocate ==
Blocki was an active advocate for the pharmaceutical industry and the burgeoning American perfume industry. He was a charter member and from 1909-1910 served as first vice president of the Manufacturing Perfumers' Association in New York (now the Personal Care Products Council). He was also a founding member and permanent corresponding secretary of the Chicago Veteran Druggists Association and the first president of the Perfumery, Soap and Extract Makers' Association of Chicago.

In the early 1900s, American perfumes began to increase in value and Blocki attributed this increase to progress made in the art by American perfumers. Well trained chemists were essential to this progress and Blocki was an early supporter of the UIC College of Pharmacy being an active member since 1867. He donated several perfumery trade items to the school's pharmaceutical museum: a musk pod, two containers of East Indian buffalo horn packed with civet as well as an essay on the use of musk and civet in perfume, and a small model of a copper still like the type used to distill rose oil in the Kazanlak district of Bulgaria. The copper still had been part of a perfumer exhibit at the St. Louis World's Fair.

Blocki's engaging character, dedication to the industry and involvement in numerous social clubs won him many friends. The fifty year anniversary of his business was celebrated at a luncheon on August 12, 1915 with members of the Chicago Veteran Druggists Association and the local perfumery trade. Blocki's friend and American League President Ban Johnson gave a eulogy. Among the many telegrams with good wishes was one from Hugo Kantrowitz of New York, the chairman of the American Pharmaceutical Association (now the American Pharmacists Association).

In February 1915 Blocki asked that a steamer being built in Philadelphia to sail through the Panama Canal to California be named CVDA. Blocki had been selected to baptize the steamer due to his expertise in cracking perfume bottles for that purpose. This was one of many voyages taken by Blocki; he was an avid traveler and spent many months at a time in Europe as well as trips to Cuba, South American and Minor Asia gaining inspiration and exploring new markets and materials for perfume.

== Presentation and patent ==
In addition to being known for high quality fragrances, Blocki's perfumes and toiletries could be identified by their colorful and artistic presentations. His perfume boutique on Michigan Avenue was so large and had such a vast assortment of perfumes that it was referred to in the trade as a "perfume palace" that was worth a visit from any retailer. Blocki frequently offered tours of his laboratory and showroom to visiting pharmacists and perfumers.

In 1907, Blocki obtained one of the first United States patents related to perfumery packaging: No. 840,105. The patent claim involved placing a preserved natural flower of the same type as that of the odor of the perfume within the bottle. This was Blocki's solution to the problem of the loss or deterioration of perfume bottle labels as well as the evaporation of essential oils.

The resulting fragrance line was known as the Empress Floral Perfumes and Toilet Waters and also the Flower-in-the-Bottle perfumes. He created a vibrant holiday display for this line that included a colored felt mat, 2-foot tall etched display bottles, lithographed announcement cards and colored blotters. He also created a sample set for this line that was in the form of a miniature book named "The Story of the Flower by Blocki" and contained four perfume samples each with a preserved flower.

The Flower-in-the-Bottle line bore Blocki's unique presentation style but he also produced several lines of perfume that followed the popular style of the times. His Regal and Bouquet lines of perfume that debuted in the early nineteen hundreds were typical of the Belle Epoque style. They were presented in classic flacons with cut glass stoppers and colorful, embossed labels depicting bold and beautiful women. Many of these perfumes were named after famous operas or historical figures; particularly Prussian and Polish noble families.

Blocki also derived inspiration from his family and one of the more artistic results was a perfume named Psyche Rose. The fragrance was inspired by the White Rock Sparkling Water company's trademark Psyche logo; a nymph kneeling on an alabaster rock and admiring her reflection in pure spring water. White Rock was owned by Edwin Gale and Blocki's brother, William. There are many famous stories about White Rock Sparking Water; one being that it was used by Charles Lindbergh to christen his plane the Spirit of St. Louis before its trans-Atlantic flight and another that it was served at the coronation of England's King Edward VII and was his preferred water for diluting wine.

In addition to perfumes, Blocki had an extensive line of toiletries and cosmetics that were sold under the Esprit d'Amour trade name in apothecaries and beauty shops throughout the country. He created a perfume with this name in 1916 along with scented sachets and powders. By the 1920s, this line grew to include night cream, face creams for different skin types, nail polish, shampoo and other cosmetics. The presentation was in dark blue tins with a floral design and gold accents. The tins were made by the American Can Company of New York and paper boxes were made by the Buedingen Box and Label Co. of New York.

== List of creations ==
Blocki was one of America's pioneer perfumers and one of the largest manufacturers of perfumes and cosmetics of his time; his perfumes and toiletries were sold throughout the United States and abroad. A sample of Blocki perfumes includes

- American Belle Rose 1903
- Blocki's Ideal 1908
- Bouquet de Vigne 1903
- Bouquet du Barry 1903
- Bouquet Helena Modjeska 1903
- Bouquet Kosciuszko 1903 (named for Tadeusz Kościuszko)
- Bouquet Pulaski 1903
- Bouquet Sobieski 1903 (named for John III Sobieski)
- Brazilian Lily 1903
- Colb's Veilchen 1903
- Empress Lily 1908
- Empress Rose 1908
- Empress Violet 1908
- Esprit d'Amour 1916
- Fairy Rose 1903
- Geisha Rose 1908
- Ilovit 1903
- Italian Violette 1903
- Naiad's Breath 1903
- Ollantay 1922
- Pearl of Persia 1903
- Psyche Rose 1903
- Queen Louise 1903
- Regal Frangipanni 1903
- Regal Heliotrope 1903
- Regal Peau d'Espagne 1903
- Saharet 1908
- Sanrovia 1911
- Sensation 1908
- Superba 1908
- Sweets of Araby 1908
- Thais 1911
- Thisbe 1908
- Uno 1908
