= Agnes Sorma =

German actress (1862–1927)

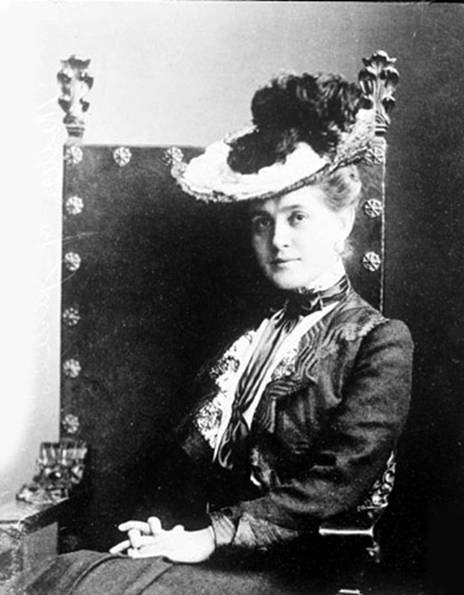
- Born: c. 1862; Breslau, Province of Silesia, Kingdom of Prussia
- Died: 10 February 1927 (aged 64); Crown King, Arizona
- Other names: Agnes Zaremba, Agnes Minotto
- Occupation: Actress

Agnes Sorma (c. 1862 – 10 February 1927), born Agnes Maria Caroline Zaremba, was a German actress best known for originating the playing the role of Nora in A Doll's House by Henrik Ibsen. Some sources give 1865 as her year of birth.

== Early life ==
Agnes Maria Caroline Zaremba was born in Breslau, Province of Silesia, Prussia (now Wrocław, Poland). A street in Breslau was once named Agnes-Sorma-Straße in her honour, but when the city was transferred to Poland after World War II, the street was renamed to Ulica Heleny Modrzejewskiej after Sorma's near-contemporary, the Polish actress Helena Modjeska.

== Career ==
In 1884, having performed in regional theatres, Sorma was invited to join the Deutsches Theater in Berlin, as a character actress. Sorma, for whom the part was written, was perhaps best known for playing Nora in Henrik Ibsen's A Doll's House, beginning in 1894. She played Nora in Paris in 1899, where a critic marveled at her interpretation of the character: "Sorma has no need to resort to the tricks and devices of the art of acting; she had but to live and to reproduce that nature which she had assimilated to her own personality," concluding that "a great performance like hers dissolves all criticism into praise, and the highest tribute of all is speechless admiration." She also played Nora in the United States (1897), Italy, Austria, Belgium, Greece, and the Netherlands, and was the first actress known to play the character in Istanbul.

Other stage appearances by Sorma were roles in The Sunken Bell, Der Strom, Liebelei, The Taming of the Shrew, Diplomacy, Chic, Hero and Leander, Die Konigskinder, Mädchentraum, Cyprienne, and Morituri. Many of her performances in New York and Chicago were given in German, for German-speaking American audiences.

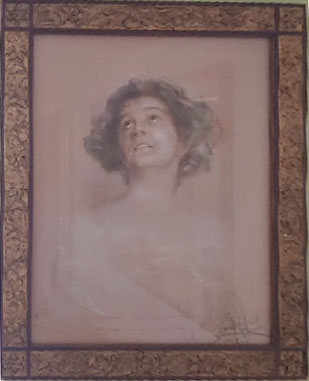
Pastel of Sorma by Franz von Lembach (Note: Painting owned by James Minotto, Jr)

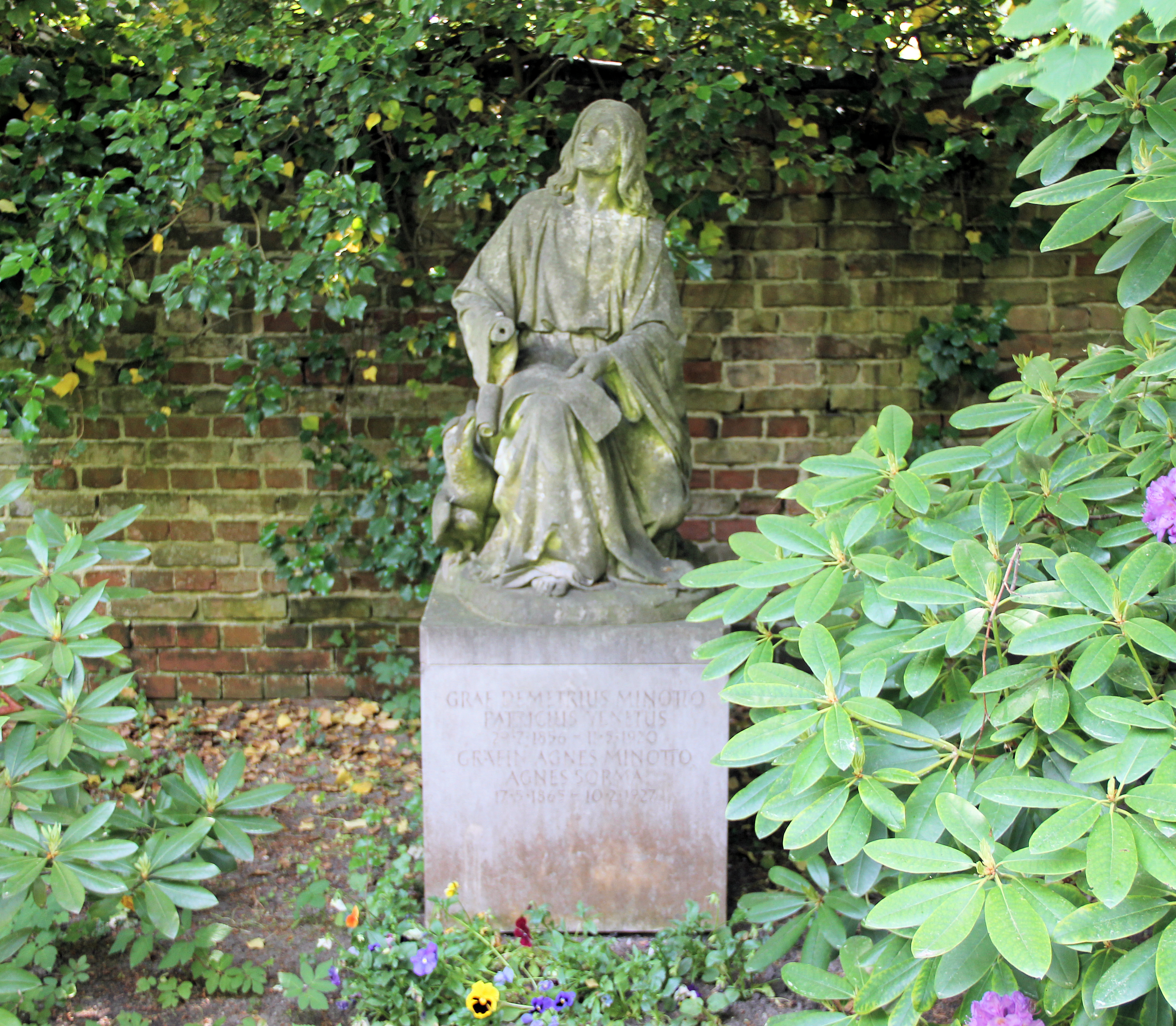
Sorma's grave in Berlin

== Personal life ==
Agnes Sorma married an Italian count and diplomat, Demetrius Minotto, in 1890. They had a son, James Minotto (1891–1980). In 1903, she was hospitalized with "a severe nervous malady", attributed to marital difficulties, after rumors of his gambling debts and her affair with actor Harry Walden.

During World War I, Sorma volunteered as a nurse and gave benefit appearances for war relief causes, but was barred from the stage in Hanau because she was an Italian citizen by marriage. Meanwhile, her son in the United States was considered a security threat because of his German birth, and held in an internment camp in Georgia, until his wealthy American in-laws, the Swift family of Chicago, argued for his release.

Sorma was widowed in 1920, and she moved to the United States to be near her son, who had a ranch in Arizona, the Z Triangle. She sold her collection of art and antiques in 1925, to fund her travels. She was injured in a fall from a horse in 1926, and she died in Crown King, Arizona, in 1927, aged 63 years, from heart failure. Her grave is in Berlin.

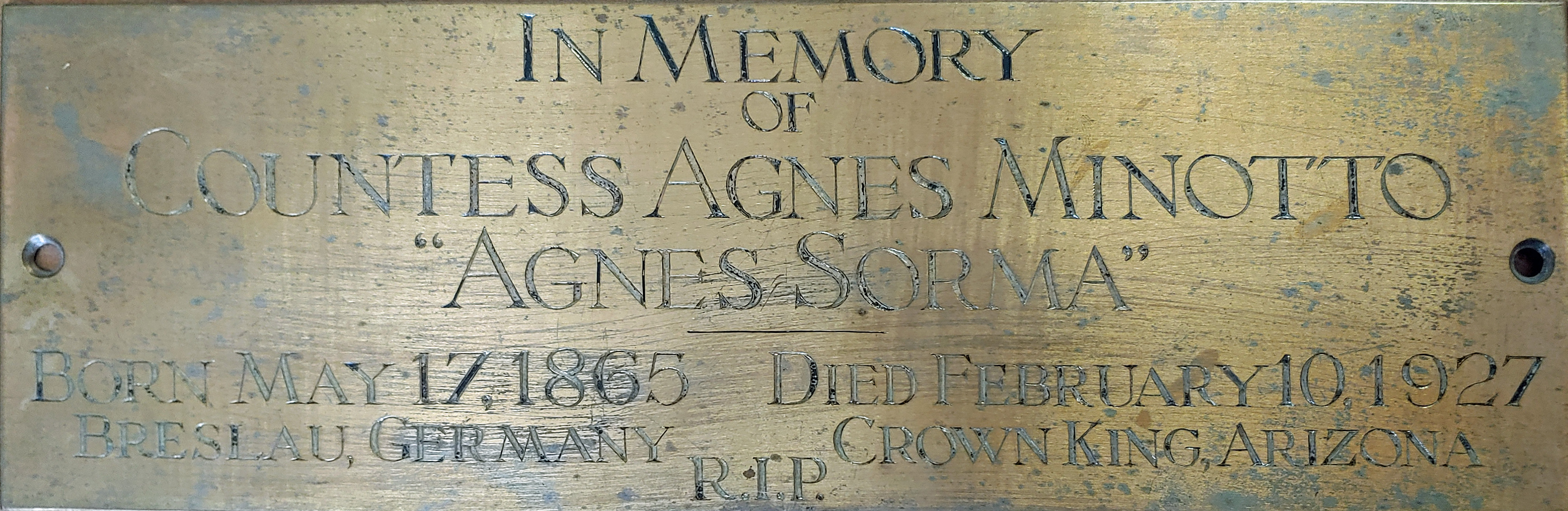
Bronze grave marker for the countess in Crown King, Arizona (Note: Originally on a granite boulder marking her grave, it was stolen and eventually recovered by James Minotto, Jr.)

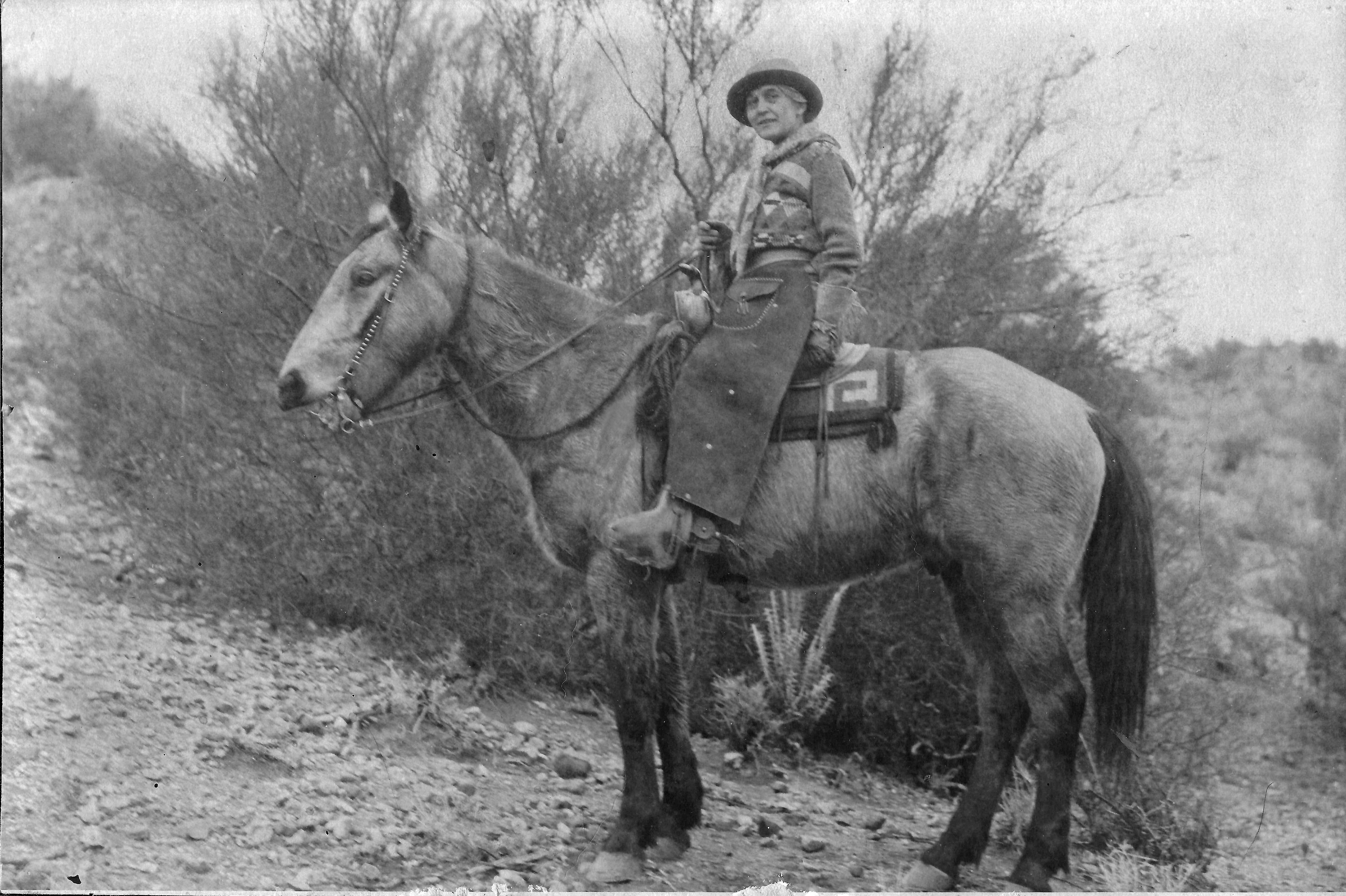
Sorma on horseback in Crown King, Arizona, c. 1927 (Note: Photographer unknown. Photo is part of the James Minotto, Jr collection)

Sorma's grandson, James Minotto Jr (1946– ), lives in Phoenix, Arizona. Her granddaughter, Anina Minotto (1950– ), lives in Altadena, California. She had two other grandchildren, Idamay "Sissi" Minotto Walker (1920–1996), buried in Skull Valley, Arizona; and Demetrius "Mitri" Minotto (1917–1968), buried in Phoenix, Arizona. Sorma's great-granddaughters, Laurel Walker Denton and Carol Walker Belmore, live in Skull Valley, Arizona. Denton is a professional horsewoman and rancher, and has served as president of the Arizona Quarter Horse Association and editor of that organization's magazine.
