= Modjeska Youth Theater Company =

American theatre company

Coordinates: 43°00′44.8″N 87°55′36.1″W

The Modjeska Youth Theater Company was a nonprofit theater company based out of the Modjeska Theater on 12th and Mitchell in Milwaukee, Wisconsin. The theater put on shows that were performed and crewed solely by students. The program served also as an outreach and afterschool program for inner city kids.

The Modjeska Youth Theater is no longer in operation. Financial difficulties brought on by building maintenance and a decrease in audience attendance eventually became this company's demise.

The Modjeska Theater is still in use, but no longer as a youth theater.

== Shows ==
The Modjeska Youth Theater Company put on four shows in a normal season. They were most often musicals with a large cast so that they could get as many young people involved as possible. A typical show ran for two weekends plus the company put on shows during the week so that schools could come in and experience the theater.

The shows they have done include: The Wizard of Oz, Starmites, Peter Pan, Guys and Dolls, Annie, Anything Goes, The Wiz, The Sound of Music, Joseph and the Amazing Technicolor Dreamcoat, Seussical the Musical, Fame, Aida, Beauty and the Beast, Cats, Grease, Dreamgirls, The Me Nobody Knows, High School Musical, A Chorus Line, Oliver!, Fiddler on the Roof, Once on This Island, Attack of the Elvis Impersonators, and "Stand and Deliver".

The 2008–2009 season features many musicals including West Side Story in early fall 2008, The Death and Life of Sneaky Fitch in late winter 2009, Willy Wonka & the Chocolate Factory in early spring 2009, Chicago in summer 2009, and one play, To Kill a Mockingbird scheduled for winter 2009.

The last show the Modjeska Youth Theater Company put on was a musical adaptation of "The Jungle Book."
