= Harry J. Sargent =

American Actor, Magician and Theatre Manager

Harry J. Sargent (1843–1896) was an American actor, magician, theatre manager and agent who promoted several female actors including Madame Modjeska, Hortense Rhéa, Madame Janauschek and Adelaide Moore. He also promoted a series of exhibition bouts between boxers John L. Sullivan and Billy Madden. His final years were spent in England where he died in poverty.

== Early years ==
His real name was Harry/Henry Sargent Jones and he was born in Machiasport, Maine, January 1, 1843, moving to Boston with his family whilst still a child. His mother was Sarah Ann Marston (c1805-1864) and father Thomas Jones (1794–1863). Jones took up amateur dramatics and became a utility man at the Boston Theatre during the season of 1858–59. In the 1860 Boston census his occupation was described as clerk.

== Civil War ==
On April 18, 1861, at Brooklyn, Jones joined the 14th Regiment New York State Militia, Company F, as a private. The regiment, known as the Red Legged Devils, saw action in some of the major engagements of the Civil War including Bull Run and Gettysburg. Regimental losses during the war amounted to 721 men, including killed, wounded and missing. Jones was promoted to sergeant and later to sergeant major, leaving the army on June 6, 1864. In later life, when he performed as an illusionist, he elevated his rank and called himself "Colonel H.J. Sargent, the Wizard of the South".

== Post war ==
An entry in the Washington Evening Star dated September 29, 1864 reported that "H. Sargent Jones, of New York, has been appointed to a first class clerkship in the General Post Office Department, at a salary of $1200 per annum". On October 18, 1864, Jones married Ellen (Nellie) Amanda Hovey (1844–1889) in Lexington, Massachusetts. During this period and over the next few years he performed as a magician and in 1869, became a lessee and manager of the Lyceum Theatre, Boston. In 1870, now known as Harry Sargent, he was involved with the management of theatrical productions in Indianapolis. From there he moved to the National Theatre in Cincinnati, Ohio and after this managed the Athenaeum in Columbus, Ohio, for three seasons. In August, 1873, Harry and Ellen's five-year-old daughter, Alice Bell, died. In October of the same year Harry Sargent remarried to actress Hannah E. Bailey (1847–1900) (Note: Hannah Bailey's sister was fellow actress Josephine Bailey (1855-1939) who was married to actor Walter Eytinge (1854-1893).)

== Madame Modjeska ==
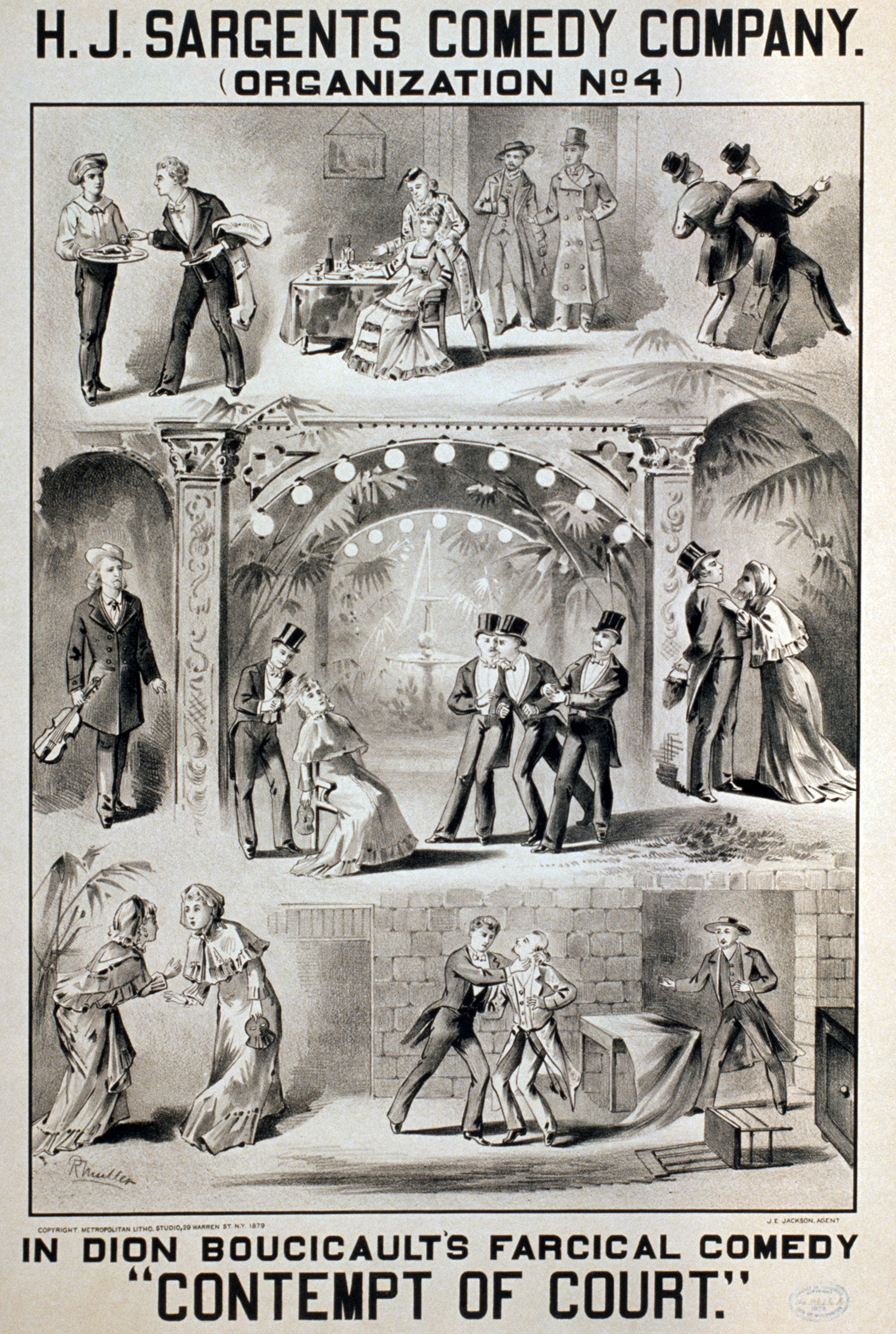
Poster for a Harry J. Sargent production of Boucicault's farce Contempt of Court, c. 1879. From the Library of Congress

In 1875 Sargent was manager for the actor and playwright Dion Boucicault, who had recently returned to America from Europe. During a break Sargent went to California to arrange a tour for the magician Robert Heller. After the completion of this he remained on the west coast managing a minstrel show and in 1877 attended the California Theatre (San Francisco) to see a performance by Helena Modjeska, playing Adrienne Lecouvreur. She was a Polish actress, born 1840 in Kraków, who moved to America with her husband in 1876 to start a new life farming. They failed to make a go of this, and Modjeska, who had a limited knowledge of the English language, secured an acting role on the stage of the California Theatre. After seeing her performance, Sargent signed her for a successful tour on the east coast. However, by November 1880 Sargent was in dispute with her, seeking a legal restraint to prevent her acting on the London stage without his sanction. Not long after this she was with another manager, John Stetson. She became a critically acclaimed and successful actress of the period.

== Other signings ==
Sargent was the agent at some period for several other actors including Rhea, Janisch, Madame Janauschek, Alma Stuart Stanley, Adelaide Moore and Mrs Scott Siddon. He also promoted many stage productions in America and Britain. In 1882 Sargent signed a contract with boxer John L. Sullivan to give sparring exhibitions with Billy Maddon during the autumn and winter of that year. Sullivan was said to have been promised $500 per week, but by October disputes arose between the boxers and Sargent and later Maddon walked out on Sullivan.

In about 1887 Sargent, who was running a theatrical agency in London, signed an English amateur actress called, Emily Jane Vertue Churchill-Jodrell (1850–1895). She had family connections to the aristocracy, her grandfather being Sir Richard Paul Jodrell, 2nd Baronet Lombe, of Great Melton, co. Norfolk. A tour was planned for her in England starting in Liverpool with her own company, managed by Sargent and Sidney Herberte-Basing. Her publicity claimed that she would be taking part in a world tour that included America and Australia. She and Sargent arrived in America in 1888 but success eluded them. They returned to England, where Churchill-Jordell took a lease on the Novelty Theatre, Great Queen Street in London, with Sargent as her manager. It was renamed the Jodrell Theatre and opened on October 22, 1888, but in February 1889 had closed with financial losses. Their next venture together was a form of variety theatre called Cagliostromantheon in Waterloo House, Pall, Mall, London. Sargent was the proprietor on this occasion, with Churchill-Jodrell appearing on the bill with a monologue written for her by Sargent and others. Within a few months the undertaking had failed, and bankruptcy proceedings were brought against him in August 1891. One of the actors who had not been paid, Arthur Playfair, tried to sue Churchill-Jodrell for his loss, claiming that she was Sargent's business partner and, therefore, liable. She told the court that she had lent Sargent the money (£1300), but later paid him an addition £500 to be released from any partnership agreement. At the later bankruptcy hearing it transpired that Sargent and Churchill-Jodrell lived at the same address in London, she had paid for a recent vacation they took together in Monte Carlo and had lent him the diamond rings that he wore.

== Final years ==
In 1890 it was reported in American newspapers that Sargent had deserted his wife and their two children, leaving them destitute in Europe. A passport application made by Hannah E. Sargent in Berlin, Germany, dated March 1889, for herself and her two children, confirms that she was no longer able to travel on her husband's passport. Her reason for applying for the passport was given as “legitimation”. She returned to America in 1890 with her children and was offered acting work in the theatre by Madame Modjeska.

Churchill-Jodrell died in London on July 24, 1895, and Sargent died in Leeds, Yorkshire, February 3, 1896. One report in 1894 said that he had been seen in London living as a tramp in rags, sauntering aimless and dejectedly about town, at night sleeping in a Salvation Army hostel. Reports in the newspapers after his death said that his last two to three year were spent in Leeds where he had sunk into extreme poverty. He eventually sought help from the Actors’ Benevolent Fund, but it was too late; they took him to the infirmary but he could not be saved. He had been sharing lodgings with an acquaintance called Swainson who had little enough for himself, but shared what he had. In gratitude Sargent left him his belongings that included his war medals.

== External Reference ==
There is a colorized photograph of Sargent Major Jones on the 14th Brooklyn Company B Facebook page.
