= Helena Modjeska =

Polish-American actress (1840–1909)

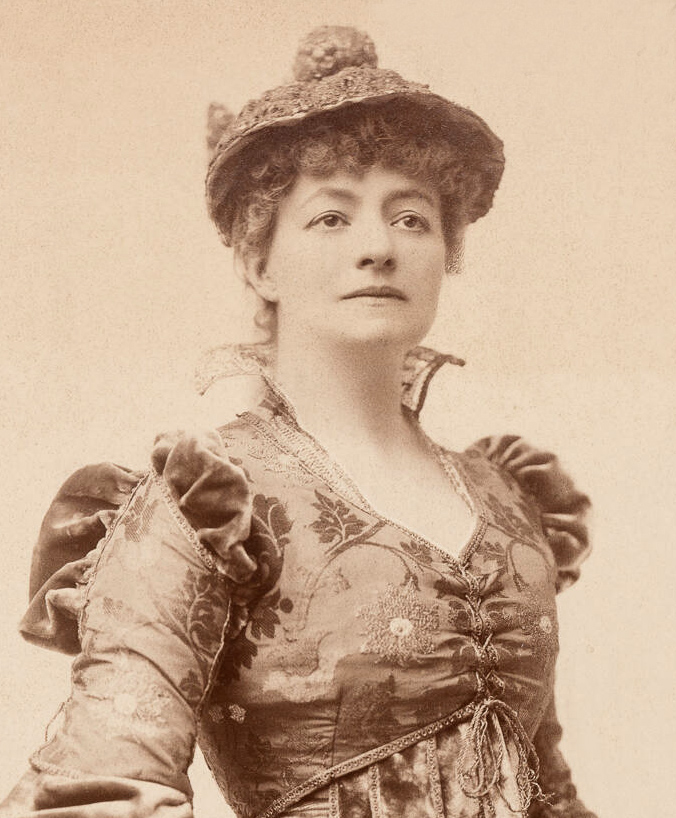
- Helena Modjeska, c. 1890
- Born: Jadwiga Helena Misel Benda; October 12, 1840; Kraków, Free City of Kraków
- Died: April 8, 1909 (aged 68); Newport Beach, California, U.S.
- Occupation: Actress
- Years active: 1861–1907
- Spouses: Gustav Modrzejewski (m. 1861; div. 1868) Count Karol Bozenta Chłapowski (m. 1868)
- Children: 2, including Ralph
- Relatives: Władysław T. Benda (nephew)

Signature
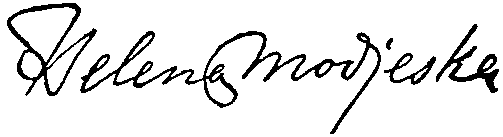

Helena Modrzejewska (Polish: [mɔdʐɛˈjɛfska]; born Jadwiga Helena Misel Benda; October 12, 1840 – April 8, 1909), known professionally in the United States as Helena Modjeska, was a Polish-American actress who specialized in Shakespearean and tragic roles. She was also a philanthropist and a socialite.

She was successful first on the Polish stage. After emigrating to the United States, she also succeeded on stage in America and London. She is regarded as the greatest actress in the history of theatre in Poland. She was also a member of the Pacific Coast Women's Press Association and was mother of a prominent Polish-American engineer Ralph Modjeski.

Helena Modjeska performed dramatic roles in five languages—Polish (in Kraków, Warsaw, and Lwów), English (throughout her 30-year American career), French (including Adrienne Lecouvreur), German (with early German theatrical companies), and Czech (onstage in Prague). Her ability to work professionally in all five made her the most linguistically versatile actress of the 19th century.

According to Beth Holmgren in Starring Madame Modjeska, despite not learning English until age thirty-six and retaining a Polish accent, Helena Modjeska was regarded by stage historians as the most distinguished Shakespearean actress in America in the late nineteenth century, performing thirty-five English roles (twelve Shakespearean) between 1877 and 1907, for a period of thirty years, appearing with leading actors such as Edwin Booth and the Barrymores, and ultimately playing 256 roles across her career.

Modjeska became a well known socialite in America, from Boston to the South; she cultivated friendships with retired presidents Ulysses S. Grant and Grover Cleveland, General William T. Sherman, poet Henry Wadsworth Longfellow, and writer Mark Twain.

== Early life ==
Helena Modjeska was born in the Free City of Kraków on 12 October 1840. Her birth name was recorded as Jadwiga Benda, but she was later baptized Helena Opid.

The question of Modjeska’s paternity and identity has been a subject of controversy and myths from the very beginning, often perpetuated by Modjeska herself. Helena’s great-grandfather, Antoni Goltz, was a German mining engineer brought to Poland by King Stanisław August Poniatowski in the late 18th century to serve as Royal Overseer (Director) of the king’s first Polish coal mine in Szczakowa, by royal lifetime appointment. However, after the fall of the Polish–Lithuanian Commonwealth in 1795 and the king’s abdication and departure to St. Petersburg, the monarch defaulted on Goltz’s annual royal salary, leaving him unpaid and in financial distress. This is attested in a letter from Giovanni Filippo (Jan Filip) Carosi, an Italian-born royal geologist and mining engineer who oversaw all of the king’s mining projects and appealed to the monarch for payment of Goltz’s outstanding wages. Following the collapse of the Commonwealth, Goltz was compelled to accept a lesser position as an engineer at the Wieliczka Salt Mine. He was married to Katarzyna Dunkain, who was Hungarian. They had three children: Jozef Anton Goltz, Teresa Goltz, Katarzyna Goltz (Helena Modjeska’s grandmother). Katarzyna Goltz first married Karol Misel (Müzel), a German mining engineer in Szczakowa. Their only daughter, Józefa (Helena Modjeska’s mother), was born in Wróblowice. After Karol Misel died in an accident at the Wieliczka Salt Mine while trying to rescue trapped workers, Katarzyna Goltz remarried Franciszek Brückner (polonized to Brykner), a government official from a German ennobled family, with whom she had a daughter-Franciszka Brykner. Katarzyna Brykner chose to leave behind little Józefa to be raised by her own mother, Katarzyna Dunkain-Goltz (referred to as ”Mrs von Goltz” in Helena Modjeska’s autobiography Memories and Impressions). Katarzyna Goltz-Brückner left little Józefa to be raised by her own mother, Katarzyna Dunkain-Goltz, and her younger sister, Teresa Goltz. After her grandmother’s death — reportedly struck by lightning while sitting indoors, as attested on her death certificate — seven-year-old Józefa was taken in by the Radwański family, the owners of the nearby Swoszowice spa estate and friends of the family. They provided her with a proper education, brought her to Kraków, and arranged her marriage to Szymon Benda in 1824, a wealthy and ennobled Kraków merchant devoted to public service and civic generosity. The marriage was held at St. Szczepan Church in Kraków on 13 August 1824. The marriage certificate was signed by Józefa’s estranged mother, Katarzyna Goltz-Bruckner, and her stepfather, Franciszek Brückner (Brykner). In her book Memories and Impressions Helena Modjeska makes references to Teresa Goltz (the younger sister of her grandmother) as Aunt Teresa, and to Katarzyna Dudkain-Goltz (her great-grandmother) as Mrs von Goltz.

Szymon Benda and Józefa had three sons: Józef Szymon, Jan Szymon, and Feliks Filip. Benda died in 1835 at the age of 63, leaving his wife and sons a substantial estate, including two interconnected town houses at the corner of Grodzka and Szeroka Streets (now Dominikański Square). A few years after his death, Józefa became involved with a municipal clerk, Michał Opid, an admirer of music and classical literature, who was married to Anna Krzyczkiewicz. From this marriage, he had a son Adolf. From the relationship between Józefa Benda Misel and Michał Opid, Helena was born in 1838, followed by her younger sister, Józefa Michalina, in 1842. Adolf Opid was two years older than Helena and the closest to her among all the siblings.

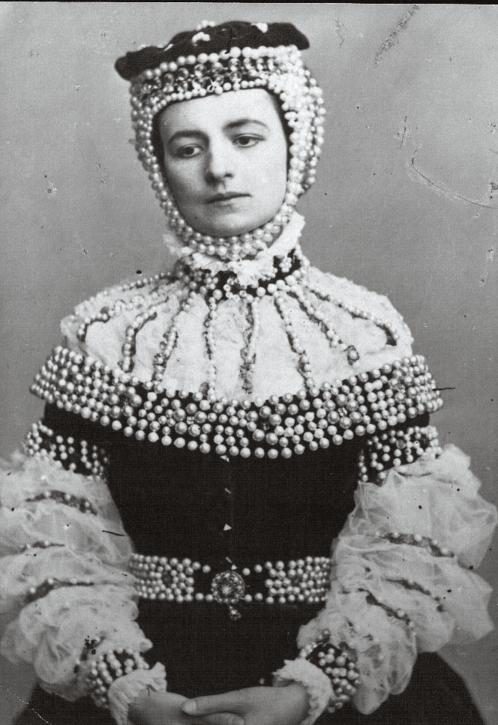
Modjeska as Queen Barbara Radziwiłł, 1865

For a long time, a popular rumor suggested that Modjeska's father was Prince Władysław Hieronim Sanguszko, a wealthy landowner and hero of the November Uprising. The basis of this speculation was likely the resemblance in appearance and life paths between Modjeska and Sanguszko’s acknowledged daughter, also Helena, who was also an actress, renowned for both her beauty and scandalous lifestyle.

Michał Opid died around 1845, when Helena was 5 years old. The two historic townhouses, owned by Helena’s mother, in which she and her family lived burned down in the Great Fire of Kraków of 18 July 1850, which could not be rebuilt, causing a financial ruin for Helena’s mother. One remaining property she owned in central Kraków, which had not been destroyed, she converted into a café that soon attracted local intellectuals and society ladies, because it offered a separate coat and powder-room section for them. The family moved into the flat of Doctor Schanzer, father of the actress Marie von Bülow, and Helena and her sister Józefina were sent to the school of the Presentation Sisters. In 1850 or 1851, the sisters began to take private German lessons from Gustaw Zimajer, an actor, who fostered in Helena the interest in theatre that had been awakened by her brothers, especially Feliks.

Also glossed over in Modjeska's autobiography were the details concerning her first marriage, to her former guardian, Gustaw Zimajer. Gustaw was an actor and the director of a second-rate provincial theater troupe. The date of Modjeska's marriage to Gustaw is uncertain. She discovered many years later that they had not been legally married, because he was still married to his first wife when they wed. Together the couple had two children, a son Rudolf (later renamed Ralph Modjeski), and a daughter Marylka, who died in infancy.

Gustaw Zimajer used the stage name "Gustaw Modrzejewski." Modjeska adopted the feminine declension of the surname when she made her stage debut in 1861 as Helena Modrzejewska. Later, when acting abroad, she simplified her name to "Modjeska", which was easier for English-speaking audiences to pronounce.

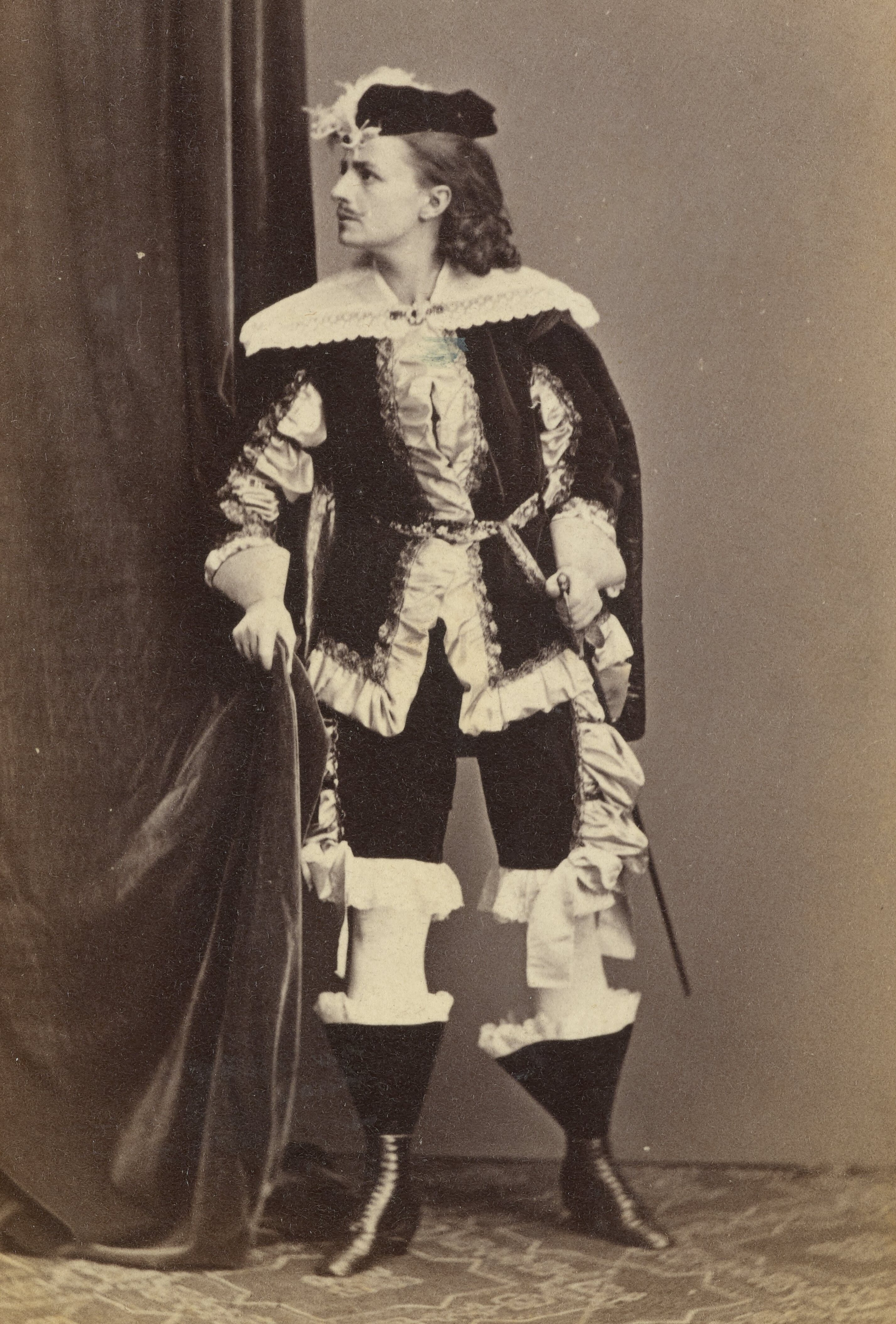
Modrzejewska as Adam Kazanowski in The Court of Prince Władysław, 1867

In her early Polish acting career, Modrzejewska played at Bochnia, Nowy Sącz, Przemyśl, Rzeszów and Brzeżany. In 1862 she appeared for the first time in Lwów, playing in her first Romantic drama, as "Skierka" in Juliusz Słowacki's Balladyna. From 1863 she appeared at Stanisławów and Czerniowce, in plays by Słowacki.

In 1865 Zimajer tried to get her a contract with Viennese theaters, but the plan came to naught due to her rather strong accent when performing in German. Later that year Helena left Zimajer, taking their son Rudolf, and returning to Kraków. Once there she accepted a four-year theatrical engagement. In 1868 she began appearing in Warsaw; during her eight years there, she consolidated her status as a theater star. Her half-brothers Józef and Feliks Benda were also well-regarded actors in Poland.

One incident illustrates the restrictions of nineteenth century Polish society. At one of Modrzejewska's Warsaw performances, seventeen secondary-school pupils presented her with a bouquet of flowers tied with a ribbon in the red-and-white Polish national colors. The pupils were accused by the occupying Russian Imperial authorities of conducting a patriotic demonstration. They were expelled from their school and banned from admission to any other school. One of the pupils, Ignacy Neufeld, subsequently shot himself; Modrzejewska attended his funeral.

== Chłapowski ==
On September 12, 1868, Modjeska married a Polish nobleman, Karol Bożenta Chłapowski. His family belonged to the old Polish nobility. In the Polish–Lithuanian Commonwealth, all nobles (szlachta), irrespective of wealth, were legally equal and held the same rights. Therefore, Polish kings did not grant aristocratic titles (aside from the hereditary title of prince).During the partition of Poland, aristocratic titles were occasionally bestowed by foreign rulers. For instance, Karol’s great-grandfather Count Felix Łubieński received the title of a count from Prussian King Frederick William III, but later sided with Napoleon and served as the last Minister of Justice of the Duchy of Warsaw (1807–1815, effectively until 1813) — the final bastion of Polish independence during the Napoleonic era — where he implemented the Napoleonic Code. In addition, Karol's paternal uncle, the famed general Dezydery Chłapowski, was granted the title of Baron of the French Empire by Napoleon for his victories during the Napoleonic Wars. He later fought against the Russian occupation of Poland during the November Uprising of 1830, for which he was sentenced to prison by the Prussians. General Dezydery Chłapowski’s sister-in-law, Joanna Grudzińska—the daughter of a very wealthy Polish nobleman who owned the city of Chodzież (formerly Chodziesen)—was granted the title of Princess of Łowicz (Łowicka-Romanovska) after her marriage to Grand Duke Konstantin Pavlovich of Russia, the brother of both Tsar Alexander I and Tsar Nicholas I. Karol's first cousin was Dr Francis Chlapowski married to Countess Marie Lubienska. His other first cousin, Jozef Chlapowski was married to Princess Leonie Woroniecka. The Chłapowski family was considered an aristocratic family in Poland. Best known in America as "Count Bozenta," he was not a count, but the only way for Karol Chłapowski to emphasize his social status to Americans unfamiliar with Polish history was to present himself as Count Bozenta. Karol Chłapowski, like his paternal uncle, was a Polish patriot, who took part in the patriotic January Uprising against the Russian occupation of 1864 and spent one year in Moabit the Prussian prison in Berlin.

At the time of his marriage to Helena Modjeska, Chłapowski was employed as the editor of a liberal nationalist newspaper, Kraj (The Country), which was owned by Prince Adam Stanisław Sapieha and a Mr. Szymon Sammelson who was Jewish. Modjeska wrote that their home "became the center of the artistic and literary world [of Kraków]." Poets, authors, politicians, artists, composers and other actors frequented Modjeska's salon. Karol Chlapowski was Modjeska's devoted husband for more than forty years, until her death in 1909. Drama critic William Winter described him as "one of the kindest, most intellectual, and most drolly eccentric men it has been my fortune to know." He traveled everywhere with Modjeska as her personal manager, on long exhausting nine-month theater tours by luxury private railroad car.

== Immigration ==
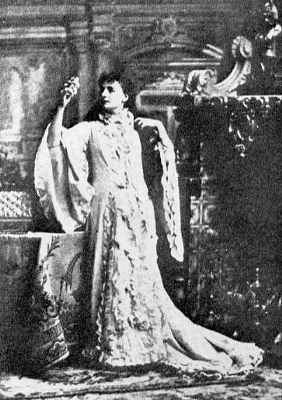
Modrzejewska in Alexandre Dumas, fils', Camille, 1878

Per Helena’s autobiography “Memories and Impressions” in 1876, to fulfill the dream of fourteen-year-old Rudolf, they went to America to see the Centennial Exhibition, and then intended to travel to Panama and from there to California. While looking at maps, the 14 year old Rudolph declared that someday he would build the Panama Canal (Pg. 245, Memoirs). “He looked so happy planning this journey that both Karol and I began to look upon the crossing of the ocean as a possibility. “Why not?” we asked. And my son put his arms around our necks, and kissing us in turn, said, “Oh, let’s go there soon!” Doctors told Karol that it would help Helena health-wise to travel on the ocean and that six months of vacation would serve her well.

My husband's only desire was to take me away from my surroundings and give me perfect rest from my work ... Our friends used to talk about the new country, the new life, new scenery, and the possibility of settling down somewhere in the land of freedom, away from the daily vexations to which each Pole was exposed in Russian or Prussian Poland. Henryk Sienkiewicz was the first to advocate emigration. Little by little others followed him, and soon five of them expressed the desire to seek adventures in the jungles of the virgin land. My husband, seeing the eagerness of the young men, conceived the idea of forming a colony in California on the model of the Brook Farm. The project was received with acclamation.[19]

In July 1876, after spending more than a decade as the reigning diva of the Polish national theater, for reasons both personal and political, Modjeska and her husband chose to immigrate to the United States.

The "colonists" saw the theatres of New York and the Centennial Exposition in Philadelphia before sailing down the Atlantic coast to Panama, where they crossed the isthmus by rail. They reached San Francisco by coastal steamer in the autumn of 1878.

Once in America, Modjeska and her husband purchased a ranch near Anaheim, California. Julian Sypniewski- fellow member of the January 1864 Uprising and political prisoner of the Moabit prison in Berlin with his wife and two children, Łucjan Paprowski- an amateur caricaturist, and Henryk Sienkiewicz (winner of the Nobel Prize for literature in 1905 for “Quo Vadis”), were among the friends who had accompanied them to California. It was during this period that Sienkiewicz wrote his Charcoal Sketches (Szkice węglem). Originally the artists Stanisław Witkiewicz (father of Stanisław Ignacy Witkiewicz) and Adam Chmielowski (the future St. Albert) were also to have come with Modjeska's group, but they changed their plans. She was a member of the Pacific Coast Women's Press Association.

Modjeska intended to abandon her career and envisioned herself living "a life of toil under the blue skies of California, among the hills, riding on horseback with a gun over my shoulder." The reality proved less cinematic. None of the colonists knew the first thing about ranching or farming, and they could barely speak English. The utopian experiment failed, the colonists went their separate ways, and Modjeska returned to the stage, reprising the Shakespearean roles that she had performed in Poland. Perhaps the best account of daily life on the ranch is Theodore Payne's memoir, Life on the Modjeska Ranch in the Gay Nineties. Arden, the century-old Modjeska House in the foothills of the Santa Ana Mountains designed by Stanford White, is California State Historic Landmark #205. The ranch was 400 acres. In her autobiography Memories and Impressions she refers to her Arden house as her “American bungalow”.

== American career ==
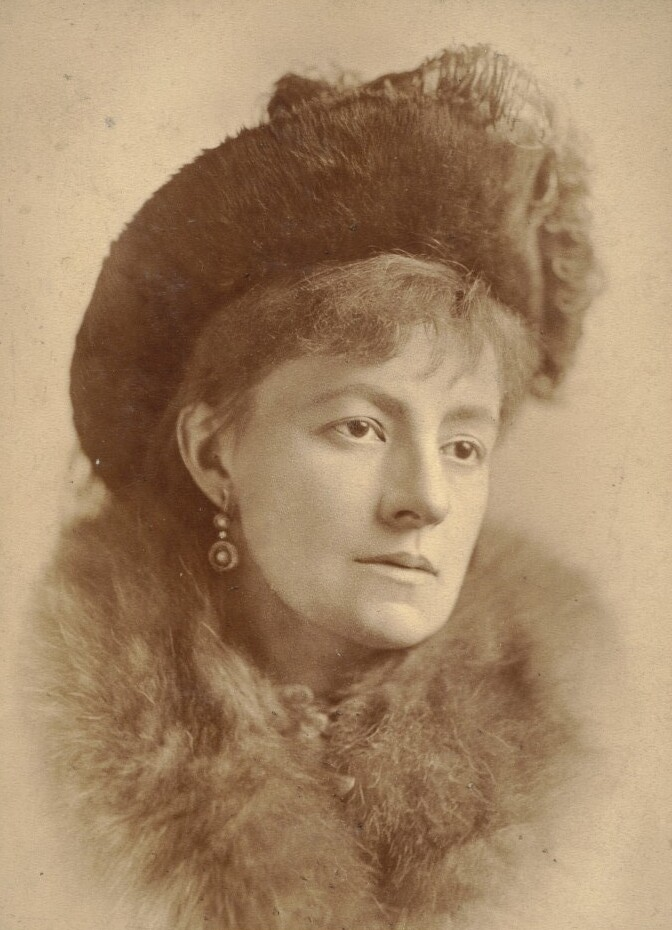
Modjeska, c. 1879

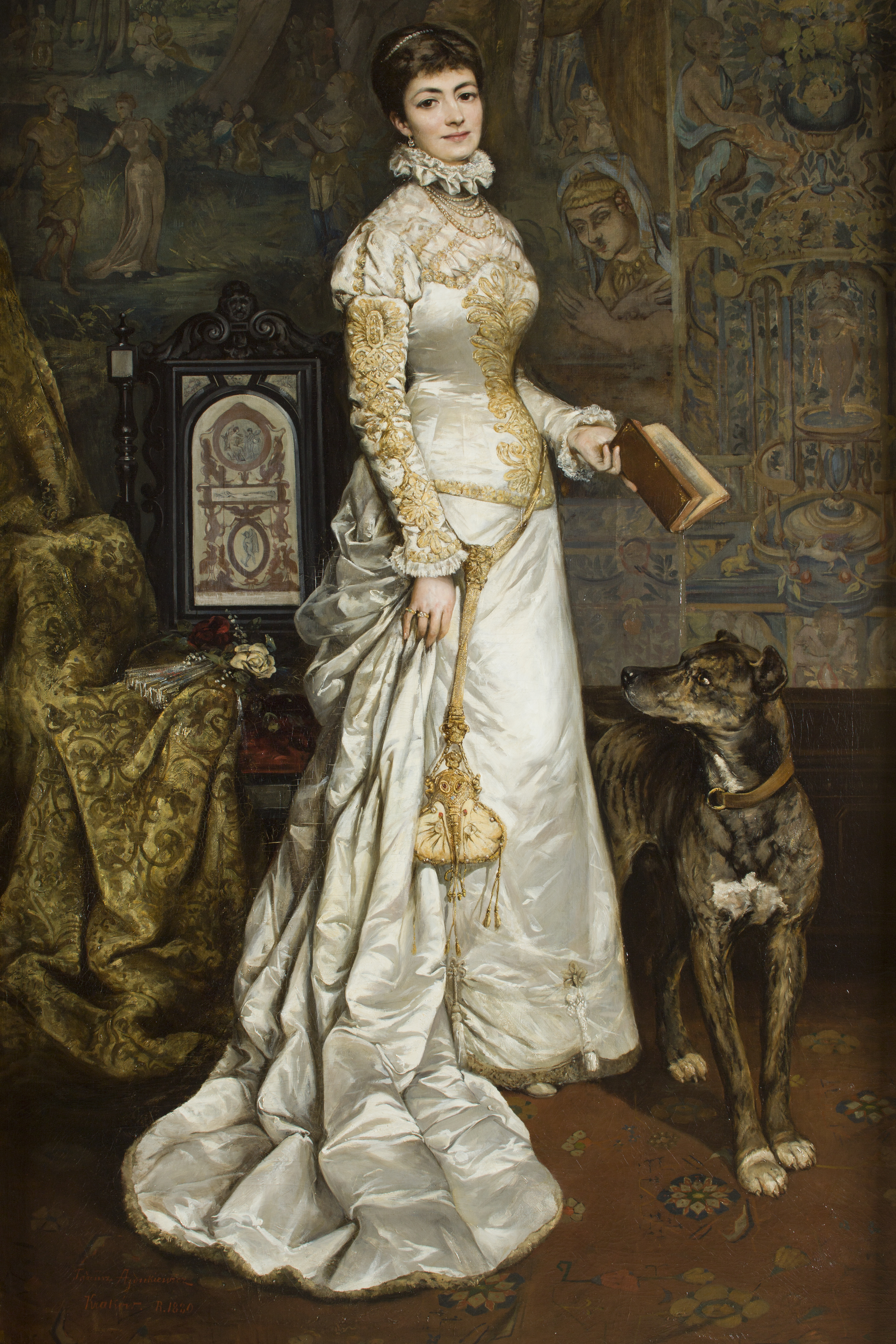
Helena Modrzejewska. Portrait by Tadeusz Ajdukiewicz, 1880.

On 20 August 1877, Modjeska debuted at the California Theatre in San Francisco in an English version of Ernest Legouvé's Adrienne Lecouvreur. She was seen by theatrical agent Harry J. Sargent who signed her for a tour on the east coast where she made her New York debut. She then spent three years abroad (1879–82), mainly in London, attempting to improve her English, before returning to the stage in America. In 1880, she visited the Lizard Peninsula in Cornwall and on hearing that the parish church of Ruan Minor was in need of an organ she collaborated with Mr J Forbes-Robertson to put on a performance. Romeo and Juliet was performed on a temporary stage in the vicarage garden and watched by many local people. A resident of Penzance and soon-to-be member of parliament for the St Ives constituency, Charles Campbell Ross, played the part of Friar Laurence.

Despite her accent and imperfect command of English, she achieved great success. During her career, she played nine Shakespearean heroines, Marguerite Gautier in Camille, and Schiller's Maria Stuart. In 1883, the year she obtained American citizenship, she produced Henrik Ibsen's A Doll's House in Louisville, Kentucky, the first Ibsen play staged in the United States. In the 1880s and 1890s, she had a reputation as the leading female interpreter of Shakespeare on the American stage. In her book Starring Madame Modjeska, Beth Holmgren writes: ” Although she did not learn English until she was thirty-six years old, Helena Modjeska is still regarded by stage historians as America's most distinguished Shakespearean actress of the last quarter of the nineteenth century. Despite the handicap of her Polish accent, she played thirty-five English roles, twelve of them Shakespearean, during a career in this country that lasted (with a few interruptions for illness and appearances abroad) from 1877 until 1907, a period of thirty years. Among those with whom she appeared were Edwin Booth, the greatest English-speaking actor of his day; Maurice and Georgie Barrymore, the parents of Lionel, Ethel and John; Otis Skinner and his future wife, Maud Durbin; and James 0'Neill, the father of playwright Eugene 0'Neill. Altogether, in Poland and America, she played 256 roles during her lifetime.

Helena Modjeska is the only stage actress who has performed dramatic playwrights roles in five languages: Polish, French, German, English and Czech (in Prague).

In “Starring Madame Modjeska” Beth Holmgren writes: “ In 1884 the Chicago Tribune wrote that Modjeska’s last Mary Stuart was aristocratic- her composure, her humiliation, and her passion breathing that charm of gentle breeding which is the inheritance of a lady rather than a trick of the stage, or even a direct result of art”

Beth Holmgren writes: “by 1890 Helena Modjeska established herself as a one-woman institution in the American theatre, a female equivalent to Booth in her revivalist [of Shakespeare] ambitions and hits. Modjeska contrary to other artists, inspired by true artistic temperament, was always seeking to enlarge her repertory and win triumphs in new directions” according to Towes”.

In 1893, Modjeska was invited to speak to a women's conference at the Chicago World's Fair, and described the situation of Polish women in the Russian and Prussian-ruled parts of dismembered Poland. This led to a tsarist ban on her traveling in Russian territory.

Based on Beth Holmgren’s Starring Madame Modjeska and the collected historical material, Helena Modjeska established a wide network of American and European connections. In the United States, her close friends, supporters, and consistent admirers included President Grover Cleveland, First Lady Frances Folsom Cleveland, President Chester A. Arthur, former President Ulysses S. Grant, General William Tecumseh Sherman, General Andrew Jackson, poet Henry Wadsworth Longfellow, publisher James T. Fields, writer-physician Oliver Wendell Holmes Sr, writer Mark Twain, and journalist-poet Eugene Field. Her Washington circle also included Senator and Governor George Boutwell, as well as other senators and officials who regularly attended her performances.

In Boston, she took part in the Longfellow–Fields–Holmes literary group. In New York, Modjeska joined the salon of Century Magazine editor Richard Watson Gilder, where she met and interacted with poet Walt Whitman, novelist Henry James, writer Bret Harte, and other cultural figures associated with the magazine. Her regional popularity was strong in Chicago, where society women created “Orders of Helena” from pieces of her napkin, and in San Francisco, where she was received at the Bohemian Club, an unusual invitation for a woman at that time. She and her husband also stayed at General Jackson’s estate in the South.

Her stage colleagues included Edwin Booth, Otis Skinner, James O’Neill, Maurice Barrymore, and Georgie Drew Barrymore. Her relationship with the Barrymore family extended into their private lives. She allowed the Barrymore family to travel on her luxury train. This was a Pullman palace style train called the “Sunbeam” or “Dave Garrick”, which Modjeska and her husband purchased in the early 1880s for $10,000 thousand dollars, an exorbitant amount at that time when average annual salary was $300–500. It had its own bedrooms, dining room, a living room with a piano for receptions and interviews, a modern style fully equipped bathroom and kitchen. According to Thomas J. Noel “In Greeley Modjeska's private railway car, called the Dave Garrick after the English playwright, attracted as much notice as her inauguration of the opera house. Practically everyone turned out to view her home on wheels. Such a sight was infrequent in northeastern Colorado, and the palatial car was described as a "hotel in miniature" with a "cellar in the shape of four large provision lockers under the car." The car was equipped for good living; "In the grand saloon there is a piano and the private boudoir, bathroom and kitchen are wonderful examples of what comforts can be supplied in a small space. Modjeska says that without these comforts no actress would be able to withstand the fatigue of a series of one-night stands and do justice to her part at night”.

Per Ethel Barrymore, both of her parents worshipped Modjeska (as per documentary by Basia Myszynska Woman Triumphant). Modjeska eventually guided Georgie Drew Barrymore toward converting herself and her children to Catholicism. Ethel described how she and her brother were baptized again, with Modjeska and Count Bozenta (Modjeska’s husband) serving as Lionel Barrymore’s godparents, and Veronica Murray and Perugini as hers. After Georgie Drew Barrymore died in Santa Barbara, the Chłapowskis assisted thirteen-year-old Ethel when she traveled with her mother’s body; Ethel recalled Modjeska’s emotional response during that difficult journey.

Modjeska’s professional collaboration with Maurice Barrymore included the play Nadjezda, written for her and based on the 1863 Polish Uprising. She declined repeated performances due to the play’s taxing dual role, which led to a rupture in 1884 and a legal complaint filed by Barrymore’s wife regarding alleged unauthorized performances. Barrymore later sent an uncopyrighted manuscript of Nadjezda to Sarah Bernhardt, a Frech diva in Paris, who held it for two years. Shortly afterward, Bernhardt appeared in Victorien Sardou’s La Tosca, whose plot Barrymore considered similar to his own. He accused Bernhardt of betrayal and filed a lawsuit against Sardou for plagiarism in U.S. courts but did not succeed; La Tosca became internationally known and later formed the basis of Puccini’s opera. Despite the conflict caused by the play Nadjezda, Barrymore rejoined Modjeska’s company for the 1886–87 season.

Modjeska’s European friends and acquaintances included major artistic, literary, and musical figures, to include English Poet -Alfred Lord Tennyson, English poet and playwright -Robert Browning, American-born painter and printmaker in London-James Whistler, English painter and co-founder of the Pre-Raphaelite Brotherhood-Sir John Everett Millais, English painter and designer of the Pre-Raphaelite movement Sir Edward- Burne-Jones, Dutch-British painter - Lawrence Alma-Tadema, French illustrator, painter, and engraver -Gustave Doré, Irish playwright, novelist -Oscar Wilde, French writer -Victor Hugo, and German composer- Richard Wagner. In the United States, Modjeska appeared frequently in major cultural centers including Boston, New York, Washington, Chicago, Louisville, Philadelphia, and San Francisco. She traveled primarily by her private railcar and was invited to speak at the 1893 Chicago Columbian Exposition, aligning her with leading American intellectuals and artists. Her wide-ranging contacts—friends, colleagues, and acquaintances across political, artistic, and literary arenas—reflected the scale of her career and the extent of her influence in both American and European cultural life. Throughout her career, Modjeska worked continuously and maintained a large correspondence. She wrote approximately seventy letters a week, many of which are preserved and published in two volumes.

The following are some newspaper clips regarding Modjeska and Maurice Barrymore:

New York Times (New York, New York) - May 14, 1882

Mme. Modjeska's acting in "Odette," recently brought out in London, is highly praised by the English journals. Mr. John Stetson, the actress's new American manager, is now forming a company to assist her in the country next season. The company - although not yet wholly formed - includes Mr. Maurice Barrymore, Mr. Frank Clements, Mr. Norman Forbes, Mr. W. F. Owen, Mr. N. D. Jones, and Mrs. Clara Fisher Maeder.

Eleanor Marx wrote to her sister Jenny telling her that she had seen Modjeska perform in Victorien Sardou’s "Odette" on 27 June 1882.

New York Times (New York, New York) - February 6, 1884

Mr. Maurice Barrymore, the author of the new play, "Nadyezda," which is to be produced on next Monday evening at the Star Theatre, and in which Mme. Modjeska will act the chief part, is well known here as an actor. He is now the leading actor in Mme. Modjeska's company, and he has prepared his play from step to step with her approval. The scenes of "Nadyeszda" are placed in Poland. The drama is in a prologue and three acts. In the prologue Mme. Modjeska will appear as a mother; in the three acts she will appear as the daughter of this woman. The life of the daughter runs in the shadow cast upon it by the life of the mother. The spirit of the play is tragic.

The Academy of Music in Northampton is one of the few theatres where Modjeska played (in 1894, 1899 and 1900) which are still active as theatres.

Modjeska suffered a stroke and was partially paralyzed in 1897, but recovered and soon returned to the stage, continuing to perform for several additional years.

During her last stay in Poland, from 31 October 1902 to 28 April 1903, she appeared on the stage in Lwów (currently Lviv in Ukraine), Poznań, and her native Kraków.

On 2 May 1905, she gave a jubilee performance in New York City at the Metropolitan Opera House, marking the only time the Met granted a benefice to a non-opera performer. It was organized in part by her former protégé, Ignacy Jan Paderewski, the world-famous pianist, personal friend of President Woodrow Wilson, and future Polish prime minister, who also performed during the event alongside leading artists of the era. The benefice drew a full house of about 4,000, including industrialists, politicians, intellectuals, and artists, reportedly including Andrew Carnegie and former President Grover Cleveland with his wife Frances Cleveland. The performance, featuring scenes from Macbeth and Maria Stuart with Modjeska herself, raised approximately $12,000, an extraordinary sum for the time.

Then she toured for two years and ended her acting career, afterward only appearing sporadically in support of charitable causes.

As Beth Holmgren notes, on her final American tour in 1906–1907, she was in such poor health that she once fell asleep during a rehearsal (she died in 1909). She refused a lucrative ten-week vaudeville tour that offered her $18,000. Her husband wrote to the impresario Robert Grau: “Please believe me that my refusal to appear in vaudeville conveys no disrespect to the artists and directors associated with it. She simply feels that it would not be suitable to change the direction of her work after such a long career. On the contrary, because everything on the stage interests her, she has observed vaudeville’s artistic development and progress with great pleasure.” She turned down the exceptionally lucrative $18,000, ten-week engagement and continued with her less profitable dramatic performances purely for artistic reasons. At the time, the average American worker earned only about $500–$600 per year—roughly $40–$50 a month.

In 1907, Modjeska purchased a home on Bay Island in Newport Beach, which for a time was renamed in her honor. Modjeska died at Newport Beach, California on 8 April 1909, aged 68, from Bright's disease. Her remains were sent to Kraków to be buried in the family plot at the Rakowicki Cemetery.

Per Beth Holmgren: “By 1908 her health had grown extremely fragile—she suffered from Bright’s disease of the kidneys—yet she still appeared as Lady Macbeth in a benefit performance for victims of the Armenian earthquake. She spent her final years traveling frequently between Los Angeles and Chicago to visit her son Ralph, who proudly showed her his engineering projects, his leadership roles in the Wellers Club and the Cliff Country Club, and spoke of his hopes to build the Benjamin Franklin Bridge and, one day, a bridge across San Francisco Bay to Oakland.

As her condition worsened, the press generated a frenzy. The Los Angeles Examiner reported dramatic scenes: Modjeska unconscious and near death, a priest rushed by automobile to administer last rites, and her husband nearly collapsing from grief. After her death, her body was displayed publicly in Los Angeles, Chicago, and New York before being shipped to Kraków. Thousands came to pay their respects, including at least 4,000 in Los Angeles and representatives from New York’s Lambs Club, who sent a wreath.

Modjeska and Chłapowski’s “funeral tour” across America demonstrated the massive, abiding impact of their American lives. Modjeska was mourned as a great actress, and she and her husband together were paid homage as beloved, established members of the various communities to which they contributed—their Orange County neighbors, cultured American friends across the country, and Polish immigrants whose church and native culture they generously supported—as well as the actress’s many professional associates and protégés. Bishop Conaty praised her devotion to her art, her belief that the stage was a teacher of goodness, and her generosity, noting that she gave away far more to relatives, friends, and charities than she kept for herself. Her funerals in four cities drew unprecedented respect from clergy and the public, marking a new level of dignity accorded to actors. In a 20 June 1909 letter to the editor of the Chicago Tribune, Mrs. N. Cox protested the Tribune’s misreporting of Modjeska’s enormous fortune, citing the actress’s very modest estate as testament to her benevolence: ‘She was the most generous of women and gave away to relatives, friends, and a host of private and public charities far more than she retained for herself.’ Her husband, Karol Chłapowski, reported extensively on her final days to Richard Watson Gilder, the influential editor of Century Magazine, who later published her Memories and Impressions with great admiration. Today, documents connected to Modjeska can be found in communities across the United States, a testament to her widespread influence and legacy”.

Modjeska’s final funeral in Kraków on July 17, 1909 was attended by deputies from the Austrian Government Council and the Galician Parliament, the mayor and city council of Kraków, delegates from Poland’s three partitions and the United States, local aristocrats including the Chłapowski family, local mountaineers from Zakopane, representatives of Polish theatres, artistic groups, and the Prague Theatre, as well as Modjeska’s fellow “greats,” the world-famous pianist Paderewski and the Nobel Laureate in Literature Sienkiewicz, along with a huge procession of city residents. Modjeska’s Polish commemoration surpassed her American services in its extensive, solemn linkage of theatre and church (see Starring Madame Modjeska by Beth Holmgren).

Her autobiography Memories and Impressions of Helena Modjeska, written by her in English, was published posthumously in 1910 and published by Joseph Gilder. A Polish translation ran the same year in the Kraków newspaper Czas (Time). The last Polish edition of the book appeared in 1957.

Modrzejewska's son, Rudolf Modrzejewski (Ralph Modjeski), was a civil engineer who gained fame as a designer of bridges.

== Legacy ==
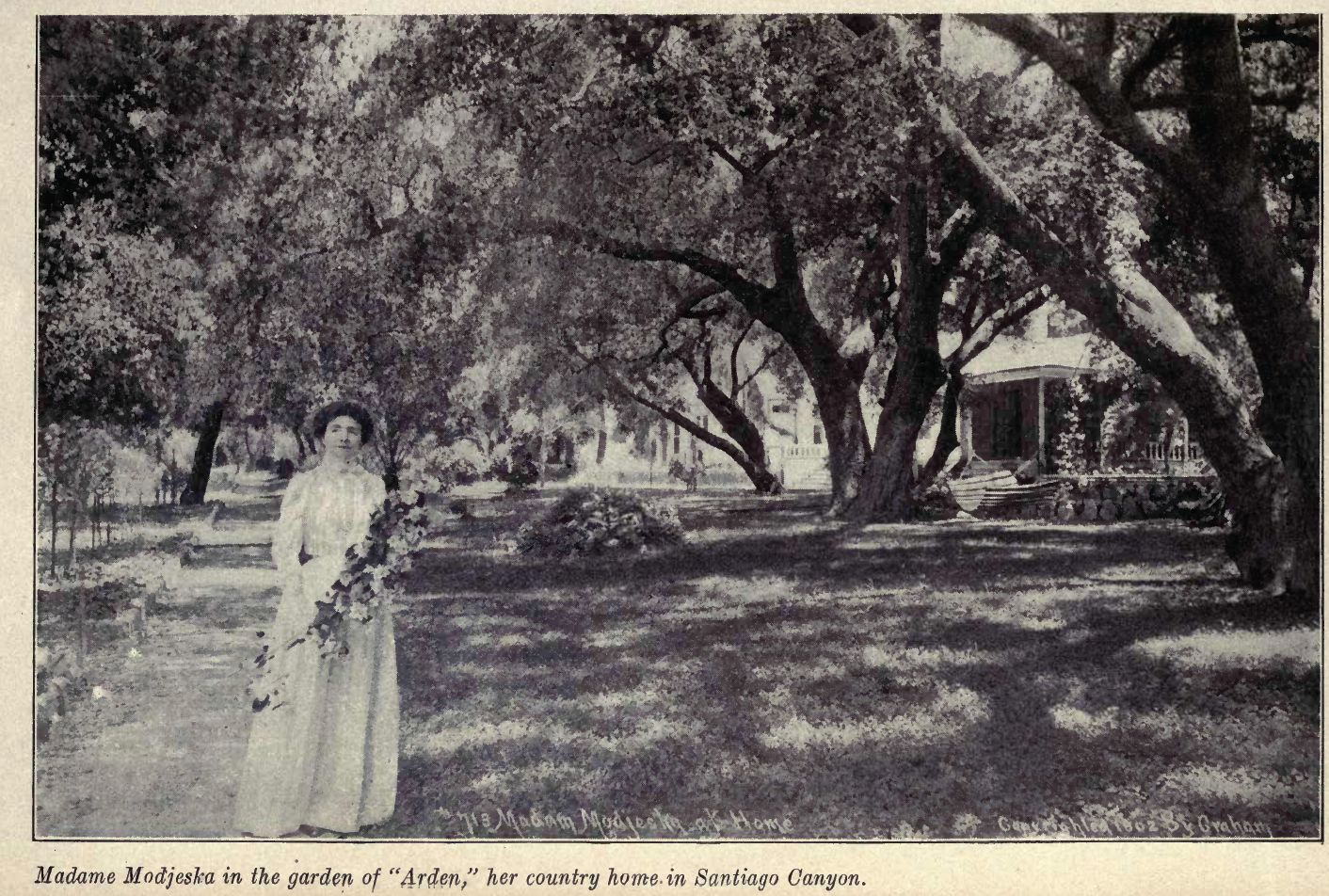
Modjeska in her garden at Arden in Modjeska Canyon, California, 1902

Modjeska's home and garden from 1888 to 1906, is a registered National Historic Landmark.

Named for her are:

- Modjeska Park in Anaheim, California (33°48'53"N 117°57'8"W)
- Helene Street in Anaheim, California
- Modjeska Canyon, California (where Arden is located)
- Modjeska Falls, California, at the Glen Alpine Springs Resort
- Modjeska Peak (the north peak of Saddleback Mountain)
- Bouquet Helena Modjeska by American perfumer John Blocki of Prussian and Polish descent
- Modjeskas, a caramel-covered marshmallow confection invented in 1889 by a local candy-maker named Anton Busath (and later made by other candy-makers, including Bauer's Candies, Muth's Candies and Schimpff's Confectionery) in her honor when she visited Louisville, Kentucky
- A street in Wrocław, formerly named after the German actress Agnes Sorma when the city was part of Germany as Breslau
- Modjeska Youth Theater Company in Milwaukee, Wisconsin
- A Pullman car, named Helena Modjeska, a 26-seat parlor–one-drawing-room observation car by Pullman Company, known for manufacturing luxury passenger railcars
- SS Helena Modjeska, the U.S. Maritime Commission’s designated ship name- a 7,000 ton US cargo steamer that ran aground on Goodwin Sands in 1946

A statue of Modjeska is located outside the Pearson Park Amphitheater in Anaheim, California.

Modjeska was the mother of bridge engineer Ralph Modjeski and godmother to artist-author-philosopher Stanisław Ignacy Witkiewicz (son of artist Stanisław Witkiewicz, who almost accompanied Modjeska and her family to California in 1876). She was also the aunt of artist Władysław T. Benda.

She was godmother to American actress Ethel Barrymore.

== Roles ==
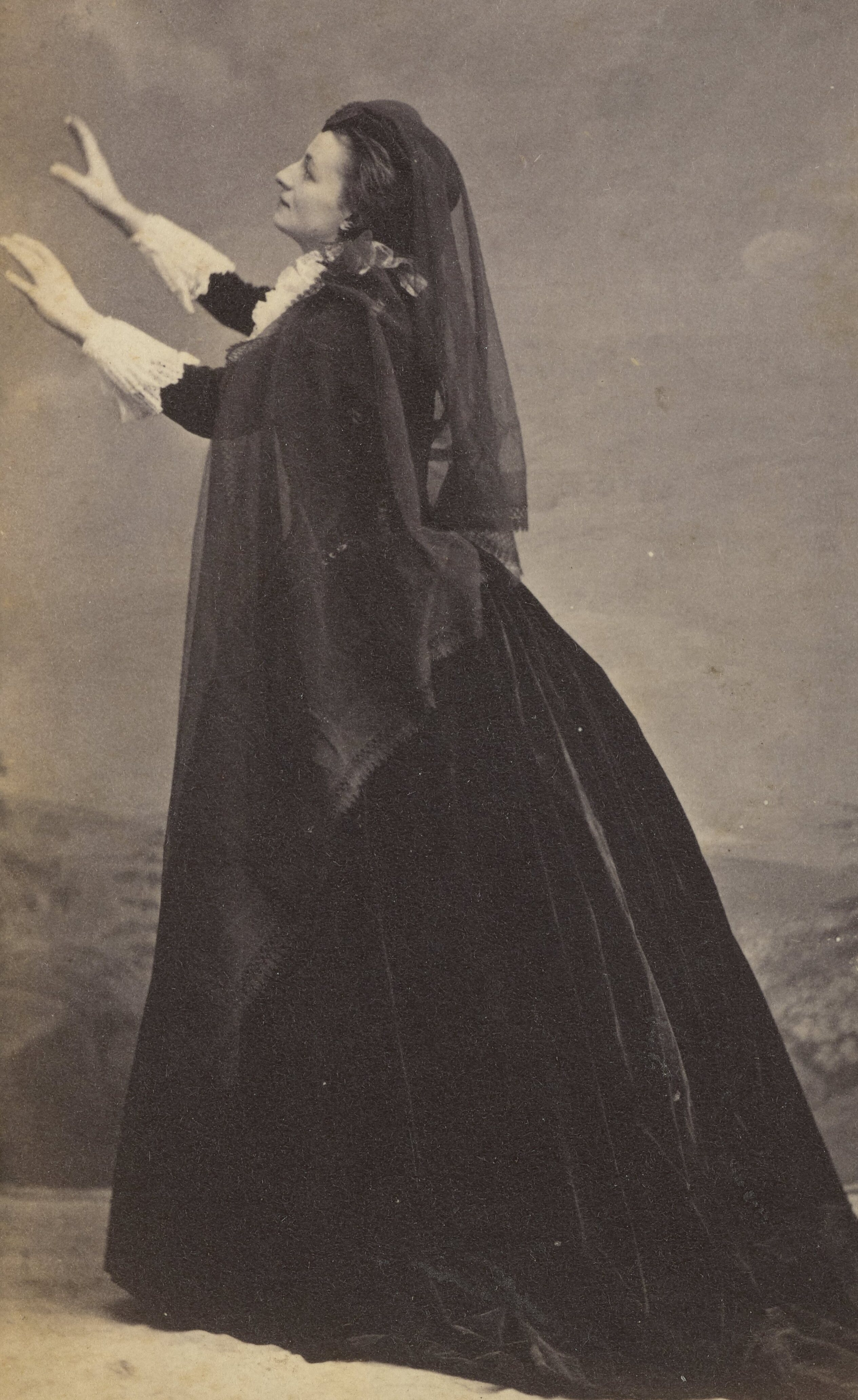
Modjeska as Mary, Queen of Scots, in Maria Stuart, 1867/1868

Modjeska's chief tragic roles were:

- William Shakespeare:
  - Ophelia in Hamlet
  - Juliet in Romeo and Juliet
  - Desdemona in Othello
  - Queen Anne in Richard III
- Nora in Henrik Ibsen's A Doll's House
- Luisa Miller in Salvadore Cammarano's Luisa Miller
- Friedrich Schiller's Maria Stuart and Princess Eboli
- Marion Delorme in Victor Hugo's Marion Delorme
- Victor Hugo's Tisbé
- Juliusz Słowacki's Maria Stuart and Mazeppa

Modrzejewska was also the Polish interpreter of the more prominent plays by Ernest Legouvé, Alexandre Dumas, père and fils, Émile Augier, Alfred de Musset, Octave Feuillet and Victorien Sardou.

Her favorite comedy roles were Beatrice in Much Ado About Nothing, and Donna Diana in the Polish translation of an old Spanish play of that name.

== In literature ==
Susan Sontag's award-winning 1999 novel In America, though fiction, is based on Modjeska's life. The book precipitated a controversy when Sontag was accused of having plagiarized other works about Modjeska.

Modjeska was a character in the novella My Mortal Enemy by Willa Cather.

Scholars Joanna and Catharina Polatynska have posited that Modjeska might have been Arthur Conan Doyle's model for the character Irene Adler, the only woman that Sherlock Holmes came close to loving. In "A Scandal in Bohemia", Doyle mentions Adler having been prima donna of the fictional Imperial Opera of Warsaw in the same years when Modjeska was at the peak of her theatrical career in Warsaw, and the fictional character's personality recalls that of the actual actress.

== Death anniversary ==
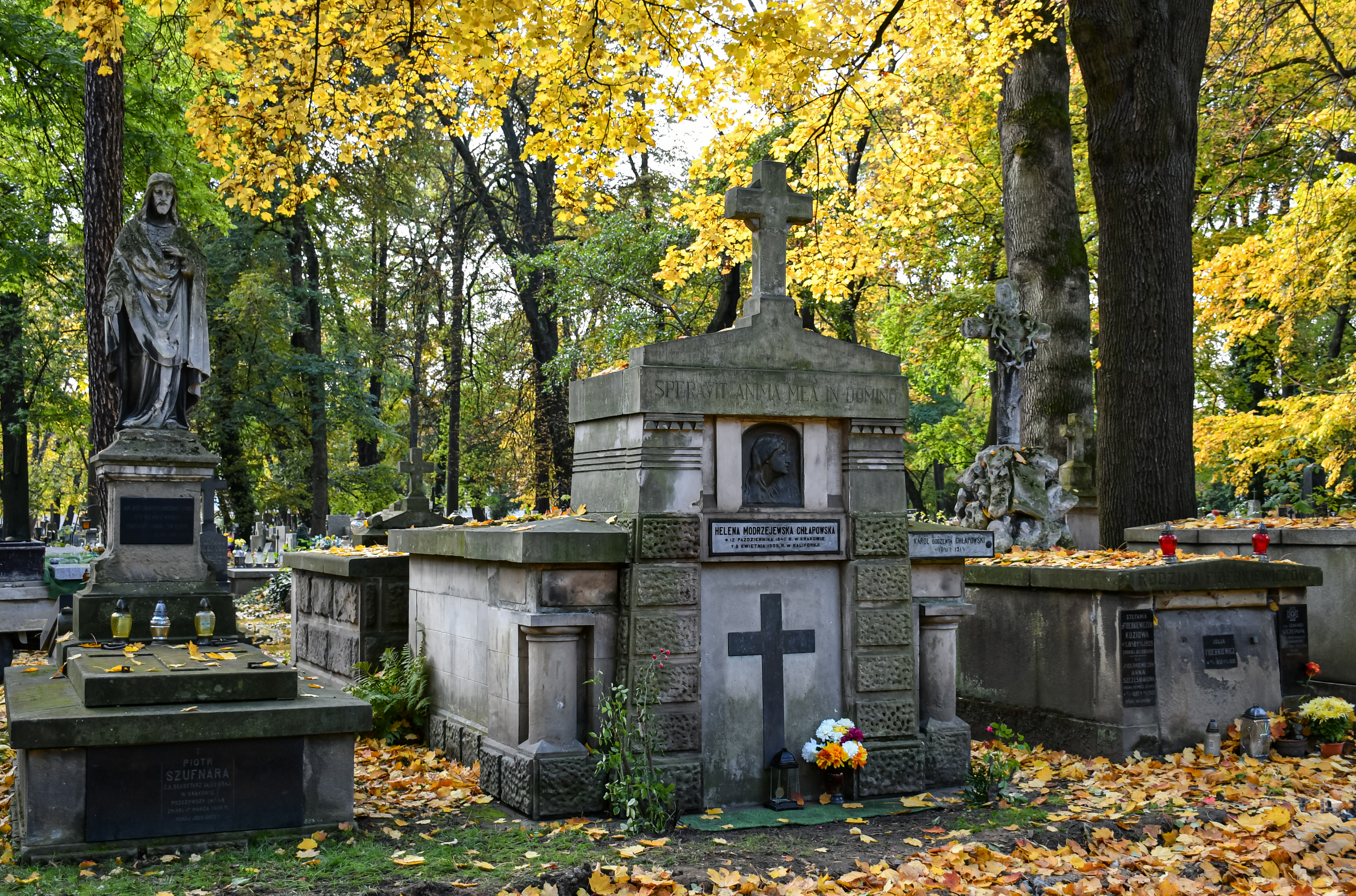
Tomb of Helena Modrzejewska (Modjeska) Rakowicki Cemetery, 26 Rakowicka Street, Kraków

In 2009, in honor of the 100th anniversary of her death, the Historical Museum of the City of Kraków presented the exhibition "Helena Modjeska (1840–1909): For the Love of Art" (8 April – 20 September 2009). The Warsaw staging of the same exhibition ran from October 2009 through January 2010. The exhibition included items from the Bowers Museum in Santa Ana, California.

=== Google Doodle ===
To commemorate the 181st anniversary of her birth on 12 October 2021, a Google Doodle paid homage to Modjeska.

== See also ==
- Helena Modrzejewska National Stary Theater in Kraków
- Starring Madame Modjeska
