= Don Stephenson =

American actor

- Born: Donald Ragan Stephenson IV; September 10, 1964 (age 61); Chattanooga, Tennessee, U.S.
- Occupations: Actor, Director
- Spouse: Emily Loesser (m. 1991)
- Children: 4

Donald Ragan Stephenson IV (born September 10, 1964), known as Don Stephenson, is an American actor and stage director. He has numerous credits on both television and in the theatre.

== Biography ==
=== Early and personal life ===
Don Stephenson was born in Chattanooga, Tennessee, on September 10, 1964, to medical technologist Diane Stephenson and TVA chemical engineer Don Ragan Stephenson, Jr. Stephenson graduated from Hixson High School in Chattanooga and the University of Tennessee in Knoxville in 1982 and 1986, respectively.

He is married to Emily Loesser, daughter of composer Frank Loesser, with whom he has four children. They met while appearing together in The Secret Garden, wed in 1991, and have appeared in a number of productions together.

=== Performance ===
On Broadway, Stephenson originated the roles of Charles Clarke in Titanic (1997), Mr. Peavy in Parade (1998), Bingo Little in By Jeeves (2001) and Renfield in Dracula (2004). He also starred as Leo Bloom in the Broadway production and first national tour of The Producers in 2003. Other Broadway credits include Private Lives (2002) and Rock of Ages (2009). and A Gentleman's Guide to Love and Murder (2013) in the role of "The D'Ysquith Family".

Off-Broadway, Stephenson originated the role of Fidele in Death Takes a Holiday in 2011, and played Vissi D'Amore Boy/Thurio in Two Gentlemen of Verona at the Delacorte Theater in 2005, Sid Davis in Take Me Along at The Irish Repertory Theatre in 2008, Anatoly in Chess, and Zach in The Tavern at Equity Library Theatre in 2007.

Other roles include Tom Stoppard's Travesties at the Long Wharf Theatre, New Haven, Connecticut in 2005, and the 2014 Encores! staged concert of The Band Wagon as "Hal". He appeared in the 2018 Encores! production of Me and My Girl.

Stephenson appeared as himself during his run on The Producers on Curb Your Enthusiasm episode Mel's Offer. Other television roles include David Jordan on the soap Another World, and guest roles in Elsbeth, The Good Wife, 30 Rock, Ugly Betty, the Law & Order franchise, Glee, Happy!, Deception, The Americans and Turn: Washington's Spies.

In September 2021 it was announced that Stephenson would originate the role of Bill O’Wray in the upcoming Broadway production of the play Trouble in Mind by Alice Childress. The production was nominated for the Tony Award and Stephenson's performance was singled out for acclaim. From May 25 until June 26, 2022, Stephenson starred as Coleman in Trading Places at the Alliance Theatre in Atlanta, Georgia, a musical inspired by the original film of the same name. Stephenson received a Suzi Bass Award nomination for Outstanding Featured Performer for his performance.

In March 2024 Don Stephenson was announced to star as Doc Brown in the Back to the Future: The Musical North American Tour and starred in the musical for a year.

Stephenson will star in the new musical Elephant Shoes which is a co-production of Two River Theatre and Deaf West Theatre in June 2026.

=== Directing ===
In 2010, Stephenson directed a production of Titanic at The Muny (St. Louis, Missouri). Two years later he developed and directed a scaled-down chamber version, which used 20 actors playing all of the roles, an abstract set design, projections, and new orchestrations. Stephenson restored previously cut material from the original Broadway production and reassigned and reordered the existing material. This new intimate version opened in July 2012 at The Hangar Theatre in Ithaca, New York, and was nominated for eleven BroadwayWorld Awards including Best Director. The production was subsequently remounted at Westchester Broadway Theatre in January 2014. He also directed the staged concert of Titanic at the Lincoln Center in 2014.

He has also directed productions of The Other Place at the Alley Theatre, Houston in 2015, The 39 Steps at the Flat Rock Playhouse, North Carolina in 2010 Noises Off at the Pittsburgh Public Theater in 2014, Lend Me a Tenor (BroadwayWorld Nomination for Best Director) at the Paper Mill Playhouse, New Jersey in 2013, Deathtrap in 2013 at the Flat Rock Playhouse, North Carolina, Cat on a Hot Tin Roof, Oleanna, The Cottage at Theatre Aspen, Colorado in 2014, Vanya and Sonia and Masha and Spike at the Paper Mill Playhouse in 2015, Buyer & Cellar at TheaterWorks, Hartford, Connecticut in 2016, I'll Eat You Last: A Chat with Sue Mengers in 2015 at Theater Works, Hartford, Connecticut and The Great Unknown in 2010 at the Theater at St. Clement's, as part of the New York Musical Theatre Festival. He directed a reading of a new play, What Women Do, by William Youmans in 2015 in New York City.

In 2015 he directed a new production of Guys and Dolls for Goodspeed Musicals at the Goodspeed Opera House.

Stephenson developed and directed a re-conceived version of the Leslie Bricusse and Anthony Newley musical The Roar of the Greasepaint – The Smell of the Crowd for Goodspeed Musicals. This new version of the show reduced the cast size to four actors and placed it in a post apocalyptic setting. The show was praised and Stephenson was nominated for the BroadwayWorld Award for Best Director. Also in the 2016-2017 season he directed The Producers and A Comedy of Tenors at Paper Mill Playhouse. The second show reunited the cast from his earlier production of Lend Me a Tenor at Paper Mill.

During the summer of 2017, Stephenson directed the Off-Broadway production of the new musical Attack of the Elvis Impersonators, with a book, music, and lyrics by Lory Lazarus. It opened at The Lion Theatre at Theatre Row on June 15, 2017. The show closed on July 30 of the same year after 49 performances.

In 2018 he directed Broadway Classics in concert at Carnegie Hall and a new production of The Will Rogers Follies for Goodspeed Musicals and in 2023 Stephenson directed the new musical "The Jerusalem Syndrome" at the York Theatre. In the summer of 2025 he directed the new musical One Night for the Broadway Bound Theatre Festival and in 2026 a newly imagined Children's Letters to God at the Laurie Beechman Theatre. In March 2026 the Weathervane Theatre announced the world premier of the new musical Paperboy which Stephenson will co-write and direct for their 61st season.
