= Hortense Rhéa =

French actress

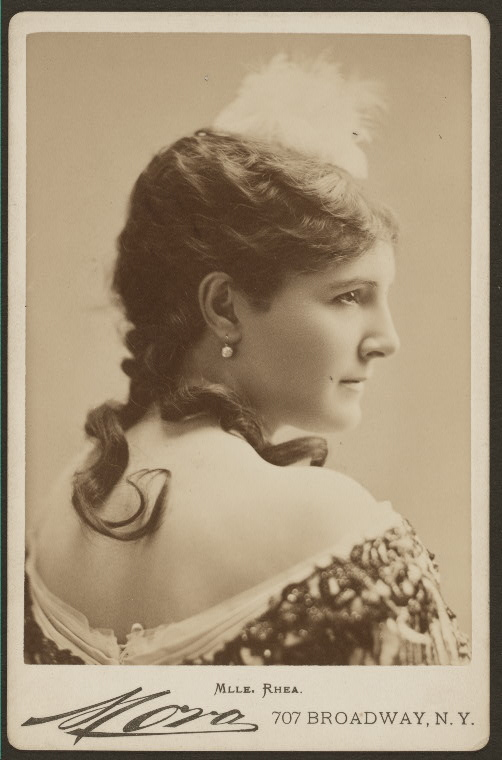
- Born: Hortense Barbe-Loret; 4 September 1844; Brussels, Belgium
- Died: 5 May 1899 (aged 54); Montmorency, Val-d'Oise, French Third Republic
- Occupation: Actress

Hortense Rhéa (born Hortense Barbe-Loret; 4 September 1844 – 5 May 1899) was a Belgian-born French actress whose popularity extended to the Russian Empire and later the United States of America.

== Early life ==
Hortense Barbe-Loret was born in Brussels, the daughter of a prosperous French organ builder. At an early age she lost first her father and then her mother and was sent to France to be raised and educated at the Ursuline Convent in Paris. After graduating, Rhéa came to the attention of Charles Fechter, who in turn introduced her to Madame Samson, remembered as an acting instructor who worked with Rachel Felix. With Samson's backing she was accepted to study at the Conservatoire de Paris under the tutelage of Léon Beauvallet.

== Belgium, France, and Russia ==
Rhéa made her debut at the Théâtre Royal de la Monnaie, Brussels, in Les doigts de fée, a comedy in five acts by Ernest Legouvé and Eugène Scribe. The following season Rhéa began a two-year engagement playing principle young woman roles at the Théâtre-Français, Rouen, that led to a successful tenure at the Théâtre du Vaudeville in Paris, and a subsequent tour of French provinces. In the early 1870s Rhéa commenced a tour of the Russian Empire that in 1876 led to her becoming a leading actress at the French Imperial Theatre in St Petersburg. Rhéa remained at the Imperial until the company disbanded following the assassination of Tsar Alexander II on 13 March 1881. Rhéa, who had once met the tsar, witnessed the attack as she watched his carriage pass below the windows of her rehearsal studio just moments before Nikolai Rysakov threw the first bomb.

== Britain and America ==
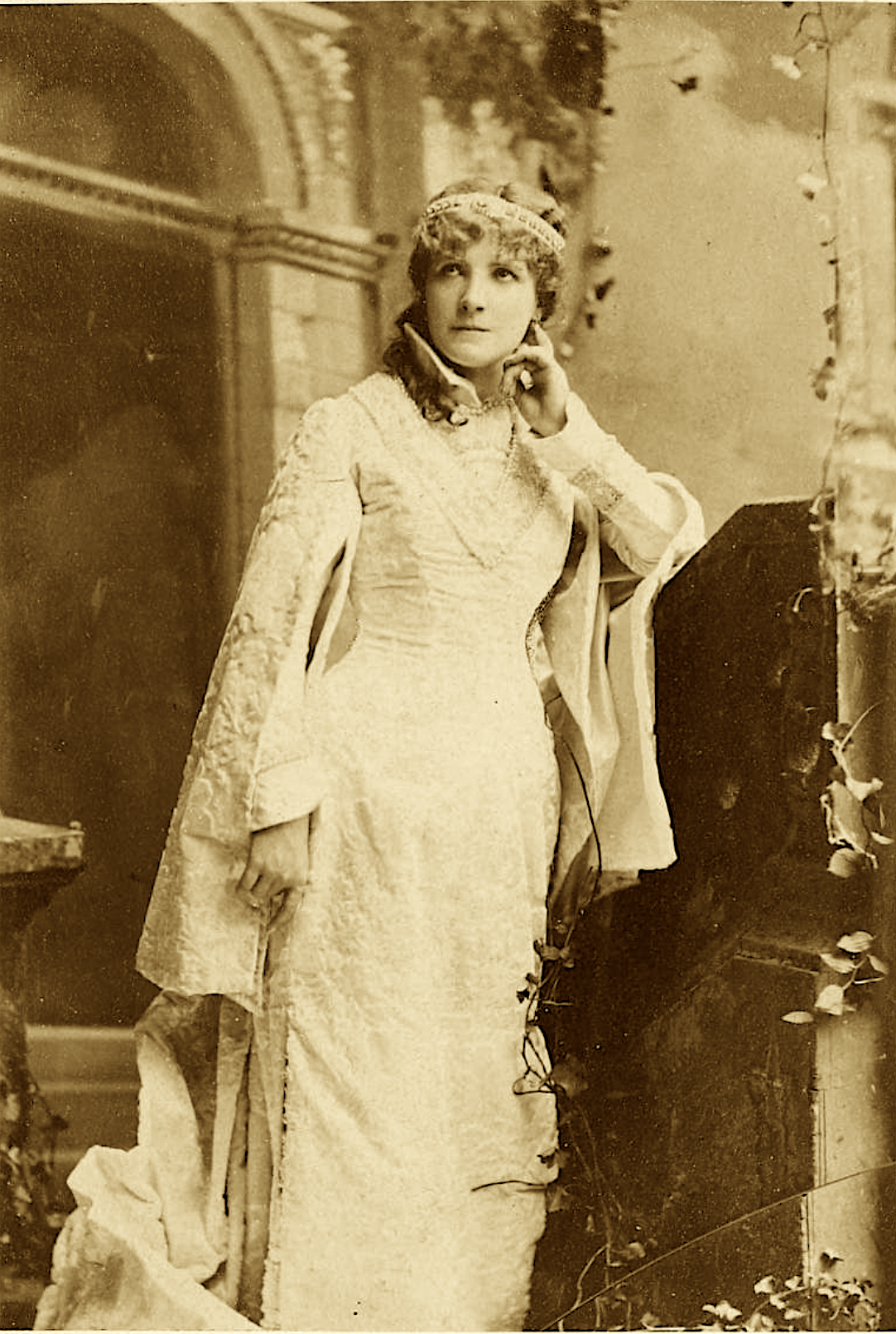
Hortense Rhéa

Rhéa eventually made her way to Britain where she studied for the English stage under John Ryder. With limited English language skills and only a month's preparation, on 10 June 1881, she made her London debut at the Gaiety Theatre playing Beatrice in Shakespeare's Much Ado about Nothing. A critic wrote:

Mdlle. Rhéa has striking endowments. A fine figure, a superbly-shaped head, clear cut and very handsome features and a powerful yet musical voice, are hers, and she has, too, an admirable method. As an impersonation of Beatrice, her performance, nevertheless, leaves something to desire. Mdlle. Rhéa obtained, in short, a qualified success.

That autumn, theatre manager Harry Sargent signed her to an American tour that debuted at the Park Theatre, Brooklyn on 14 November 1881, with Rhéa paying Marguerite Gautier in Matilda Heron's dramatic adaptation of the Alexandre Dumas, fils novel La Dame aux Camélias. Though her initial tour struggled due in part to her thick French accent, the following season's tour under the management of Arthur B. Chase proved more successful. Rhéa's repertory during this period included, Adrienne Lecouvreur, Camille, Pygmalion and Galatea, David Garrick's The Country Girl, A Dangerous Game, The School for Scandal, Frou-Frou by Ludovic Halévy and Henri Meilhac, The Case Vidal, and L'Aventurière, a comedy by Émile Augier.

Rhéa continued to return to America for tours until 1898. She found her greatest success in the country's heartland where her strongly accented English was received as more of a novelty than a hindrance. During this time Rhéa was often seen performing the title role in Josephine, Empress of the French, by Albert Roland Haven. The success of Haven's play was credited, at least in part, for rekindling an interest in America of the Napoleonic era. During the 1890s Rhéa played the title roles in such plays as The New Magdalene by Wilkie Collins, Lyton's The Lady of Lyons, The Queen of Sheba (opposite a young William S. Hart) by John Rettig, and Nell Gwynn by Paul Krester. One of her American protégées was actress Una Abell-Brinker.

== Illness and death ==
In February 1898 the press reported that for the upcoming season Rhéa would join forces with Louis James and Frederick Warde in a tour that would mostly feature works by William Shakespeare. An illness that prevented this from happening forced Rhéa to abandon the stage and return to France. She died on 5 May 1899, at her home on the Rue de Chesneaux in Montmorency.
