= Blocki =

American fragrance brand

Blocki Perfumes Inc.
- Historic JBS monogram
- Company type: Private
- Industry: Fragrance and Beauty
- Predecessor: John Blocki and Son
- Founded: 1865; 160 years ago in Chicago, Illinois, USA
- Founder: John Blocki
- Headquarters: USA
- Products: Perfumes, cosmetics and personal care
- Website: blocki.com

Blocki is an American fragrance brand and one of the earliest perfume and cosmetic manufacturers in the United States. It was founded in 1865 by perfumer John Blocki, a pioneer in the American fragrance industry.

== History ==
Blocki began in 1865 as an importer and wholesaler of drugs, chemicals, perfumes, essences and essential oils. By 1895 the company specialized in making perfumes and cosmetics with John Blocki as the chief chemist and perfumer overseeing creation. In 1916, the Blocki house launched its own line of cosmetics under the Esprit d’Amour trade name.

In 1904 Blocki opened a perfume showroom and laboratory on Michigan Avenue in Chicago that was regarded as one of the most up-to-date in the United States. It was also the first perfume boutique in Chicago. The Blocki perfumery became a specimen of retail display due to its extensive collection of perfumes.

As part of a partnership with the Franco American Hygienic Company, Blocki also operated perfume laboratories and manufacturing facilities in San Francisco and New York. In 1909, Blocki partnered with The American Floral Perfume Co. to open a perfume laboratory in Toronto, Canada.

Blocki was known for its innovative and eye-catching perfume packaging design. One of its popular line of fragrances was named Flower-in-the-Bottle because each perfume contained a preserved natural flower corresponding to the type of perfume. In 1907, Blocki received a U.S. and Canadian patent for this packaging innovation.

The Blocki house was owned and operated by the Blocki family during most of its existence. John Blocki retired in 1930 and his daughter, Jeannette Blocki Petersen, took over as active head of the business. She sold the company to the Winter Group in the 1940s and they ran it for a decade before ceasing operations. It was later reopened by John Blocki’s great-great-grandson and his wife with a trio of fragrances to celebrate the 150th anniversary of the brand’s founding.

Today Blocki is an independent perfumery creating modern fragrances that recall its unique Gilded Age history as a pioneer American perfumery.
