= Władysław T. Benda =

American painter

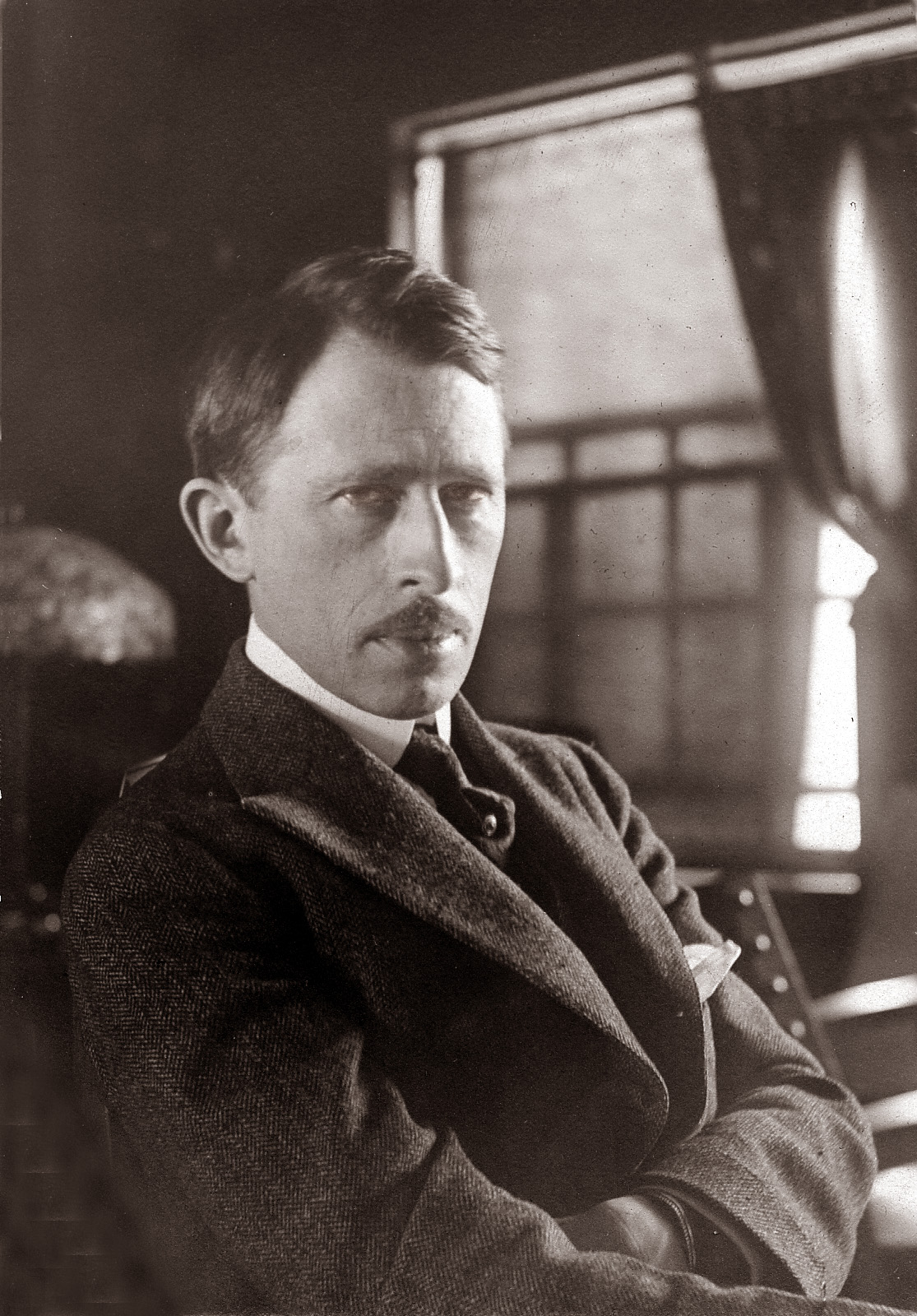
- Władysław Benda, 1900
- Born: 15 January 1873; Posen, German Empire
- Died: 1948 (aged 74–75); Newark, New Jersey, U.S.
- Known for: painter, illustrator, designer
- Spouse: Romola Campfield
- Children: 2
- Relatives: Helena Modjeska (aunt)

Władysław Teodor "W.T." Benda (15 January 1873 – 30 November 1948) was a Polish painter, illustrator, and designer.

== Early life ==
The son of musician Jan Szymon Benda, and a nephew of the actress Helena Modrzejewska (known in the United States as Helena Modjeska), W.T. Benda studied art at the Kraków College of Technology and Art in his native Poland and at the School of Fine Arts in Vienna, Austria. He came to the United States in 1899, to visit his Aunt Helena, who then lived in California. He stayed, and moved to New York City in 1902, where he attended the Art Students League of New York and the William Merritt Chase School. While there, Benda studied under Robert Henri and Edward Penfield.

He joined the Society of Illustrators in 1907, the Architectural League in 1916, and became a naturalized American in 1911. He was also a member of the National Society of Mural Painters.

== Personal life ==
He remained in NYC for the rest of his life. Benda married Romola Campfield, and they had two daughters, Eleonora and Basia, who were both artists.

== Work ==
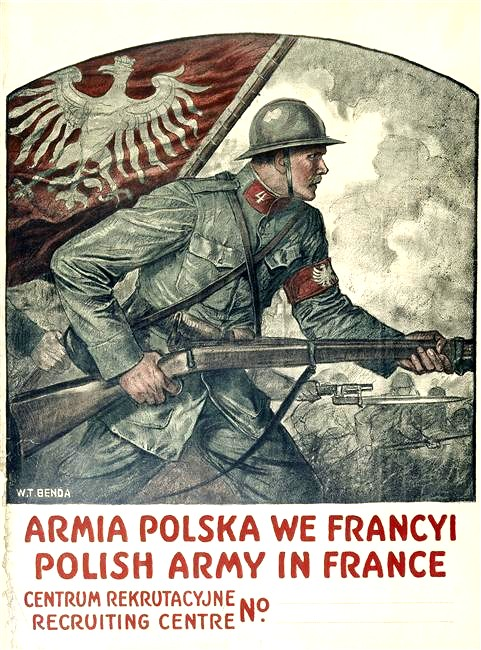
WWI recruitment poster Polish Army in France created by Władysław Benda

Starting in 1905, Benda was primarily a graphic artist. He illustrated books, short stories, advertising copy, and magazine covers for Collier's, McCall's, Ladies' Home Journal, Good Housekeeping, Theatre Magazine and many others. Many publishers regarded Benda as their go-to artist for his dependability and artistic abilities. In his time he was as well known as Norman Rockwell, N.C. Wyeth or Maxfield Parrish. During the 1920s/1930s every publication sought the look of "the American Girl", but Benda's beautiful women were often exotic and mysterious, not homespun pretty like the girls of Harrison Fisher or Howard Chandler Christy. Benda was fiercely proud of his Polish heritage and became closely associated with the Polish-American cultural institution, The Kosciuszko Foundation (see below). During the two World Wars, he designed many posters for both Poland and America. Many of these posters advocated for relief efforts. He was honored with the ‘Polonia Restituta’ decoration by the Polish government following World War I.

Beginning in 1914, Benda was also an accomplished mask maker and costume designer. His sculpted, papier-mâché face masks were used in plays and dances and often in his own paintings and illustrations. They were used in masques or miracle plays in New York City at venues like the New York Coffee House. Benda also created the masks for stage productions in New York and London for such writers as Eugene O'Neill and Noël Coward. He became so well known as a mask maker that his name became synonymous for any lifelike mask, whether it was of his design or not. Benda also created "grotesque" masks, which were more fantasy or caricature in nature. Benda created the original mask design for the movie The Mask of Fu Manchu, which was originally published as a twelve part serial in Collier's from May 7, 1932, through July 23, 1932. The cover of the May 7 issue presented a stunning portrait by Benda. In the latter stages of his career, Benda spent less time doing illustration and more time making masks.

At Busby Berkeley's behest, Benda created scores of masks for the spectacular conclusion of Broadway Serenade (1939), including the faces of “all the great composers”. According to TCM, that project earned Berkeley a contract with MGM.

Articles by and about Benda and his masks appeared regularly in many of the same magazines and publications that carried his illustrations. In the 1930s, he authored the Encyclopædia Britannica entry on masks. He also wrote a book, Masks, a study of his own designs and unique construction techniques.

The Polish Museum of America and the Pritzker Military Museum & Library possess collections of Benda's posters for the relief effort in Poland.

== See also ==
- List of Poles
