= Attack of the Elvis Impersonators =

Musical

Attack of the Elvis Impersonators is a 2017 Off-Broadway musical-parody with a book, music and lyrics by Lory Lazarus. The musical features original songs based on the music of singer Elvis Presley. It was inspired by Elvis impersonator culture.

== Production ==
The Off-Broadway production opened at the Lion Theatre of Theatre Row, New York City, on June 15, 2017. It was directed by Don Stephenson and choreographed by Melissa Zambrema. The musical direction, arrangements, and orchestrations were by Benjamin Rauhala. The cast featured Eric Sciotto and Laura Woyasz in the lead roles. The show closed on July 30.

== Synopsis ==
The ghost of Elvis possesses a rock star and convinces his followers that world peace can only be achieved if everyone becomes an Elvis impersonator and joins the religion of "Hound Dog".

== Characters ==
- Drac Frenzie: Burnt out rock star who becomes an Elvis Impersonator and starts the religion of "Hound Dog"
- Prissy Bordeaux: News reporter who falls in love with Frenzie
- Antichrist: Drac Frenzie's biggest fan who wants to conquer the world
