= Carbondale =

Carbondale may refer to:

== Places ==
=== United States ===
- Carbondale, California
- Carbondale, Orange County, California
- Carbondale, Colorado
- Carbondale, Georgia
- Carbondale, Illinois
- Carbondale, Indiana
- Carbondale, Kansas
- Carbondale, Michigan
- Carbondale, Ohio
- Carbondale, Tulsa, a neighborhood of Tulsa, Oklahoma
- Carbondale, Pennsylvania

=== Canada ===
- Carbondale, Alberta, a hamlet in Canada
