= California Historical Landmarks in Orange County =

List table of the properties and districts listed as California Historical Landmarks within Orange County, California.

- Note: Click the "Map of all coordinates" link to the right to view a Google map of all properties and districts with latitude and longitude coordinates in the table below.

== Listings ==
Image		Landmark name	Location	City or town	Summary
Anaheim Landing	219	Anaheim Landing	Seal Beach Blvd. and Electric Ave. 33°44′16″N 118°05′52″W	Seal Beach	
Balboa Pavilion	959	Balboa Pavilion	400 Main St. 33°36′10″N 117°53′56″W	Newport Beach	
Barton Mound	218	Barton Mound	SE corner of I-405 and State Hwy 133; 33°38′53″N 117°45′23″W	East Irvine	This site is unmarked. A housing development has been built on the S.E. Corner of the 405 and 133.
Black Star Canyon Indian Village Site	217	Black Star Canyon Indian Village Site	On the east side of Black Star Canyon Rd, 5.0 mi N of the locked gate, accessible only by biking or hiking 33°48′09″N 117°39′18″W	Silverado	
Carbondale	228	Carbondale	Silverado Community Church entrance, Silverado Canyon Rd. 33°44′37″N 117°39′34″W	Silverado	
Dana Point	189	Dana Point	Ken Sampson Overview; 33°27′50″N 117°42′24″W	Dana Point	
Diego Sepúlveda Adobe	227	Diego Sepúlveda Adobe	Estancia Park; 33°40′23″N 117°56′13″W	Costa Mesa	
Don Bernardo Yorba Hacienda	226	Don Bernardo Yorba Hacienda	Esperanza Rd. and Echo Hill Ln. 33°51′51″N 117°46′51″W	Yorba Linda	
First water-to-water flight	775	First water-to-water flight	S end of Main St at Ocean Front; 33°35′52″N 117°53′56″W	Newport Beach	
Flores Peak	225	Flores Peak	Tucker Wildlife Sanctuary; 33°42′40″N 117°37′08″W	Modjeska Canyon	
North gate of city of Anaheim	112	North gate of city of Anaheim	775 Anaheim Blvd. at North St. 33°50′38″N 117°55′01″W	Anaheim	
McFadden Wharf	794	McFadden Wharf	Newport Pier; 33°36′28″N 117°55′42″W	Newport Beach	
Mission San Juan Capistrano	200	Mission San Juan Capistrano	Ortega Hwy and Camino Capistrano; 33°30′10″N 117°39′46″W	San Juan Capistrano	
Modjeska House	205	Modjeska House	29042 Modjeska Canyon; 33°42′32″N 117°37′30″W	Modjeska	
Old Landing	198	Old Landing	Dover Dr. north of State Hwy 1; 33°37′03″N 117°54′26″W	Newport Beach	
Old Town Irvine	1004	Old Town Irvine	Sand Canyon Ave. and Burt Rd. 33°40′31″N 117°45′28″W	Irvine	
Olinda	918	Olinda	Carbon Canyon Regional Park; 33°55′17″N 117°49′49″W	Brea	
Pioneer House of the Mother Colony	201	Pioneer House of the Mother Colony	414 N. West St. 33°50′11″N 117°55′41″W	Anaheim	
Old Orange County Courthouse	837	Old Orange County Courthouse	211 W Santa Ana Blvd. 33°45′01″N 117°52′09″W	Santa Ana	
Old Maizeland School	729	Old Maizeland School	Knott's Berry Farm; 33°50′36″N 118°00′03″W	Buena Park	
Old Santa Ana	204	Old Santa Ana	Lincoln Ave. & Orange Olive Rd. 33°50′12″N 117°50′47″W	Orange	
Red Hill	203	Red Hill	11911 Red Hill Rd. 33°45′26″N 117°47′32″W	Tustin	
Richard Nixon Birthplace	1015	Richard Nixon Birthplace	Richard Nixon Presidential Library and Museum; 33°53′22″N 117°49′05″W	Yorba Linda	
Serrano Adobe	199	Serrano Adobe	Serrano Regional Historic Village; 33°38′30″N 117°41′07″W	El Toro	
Silverado	202	Silverado	Historic district 33°44′46″N 117°38′10″W	Silverado	
Crystal Cove Historic District	1050	Crystal Cove Historic District	Historic district 33°34′32″N 117°50′26″W	Newport Beach	

== See also ==
- List of California Historical Landmarks
- National Register of Historic Places listings in Orange County, California
