= Gates of Anaheim =

California historic landmark

North Gate of City of Anaheim
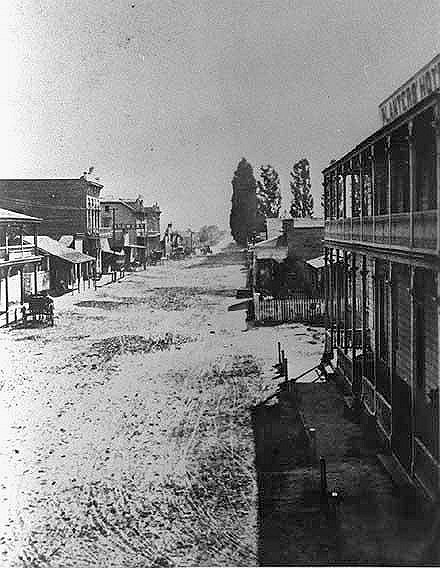
- Anaheim in 1879

- Location within California
- 33°50′38″N 117°55′01″W
- Location: Anaheim, California

History
- Built: 1857

California Historical Landmark
- Designated: March 29, 1933
- Reference no.: 112

The Gates of Anaheim are a series of gates in California that mark the historic entrance to Anaheim, California. Four city gates were built: North, East, South, and West. They were designated a California Historic Landmark (No.122) on March 29, 1933. An historic marker sits at the intersection of South Anaheim Boulevard and West South Street, at 777 South Anaheim Boulevard. The marker is to memorialize Anaheim's founding in 1857 and the city gate that was there.

The early Anaheim Colony put up a barrier around the town to block out wild cattle grazing in nearby fields. The City of Los Angeles lay beyond the North gate, making it the most frequented.

== Pioneer house of the Mother Colony ==
Pioneer House of the Mother Colony
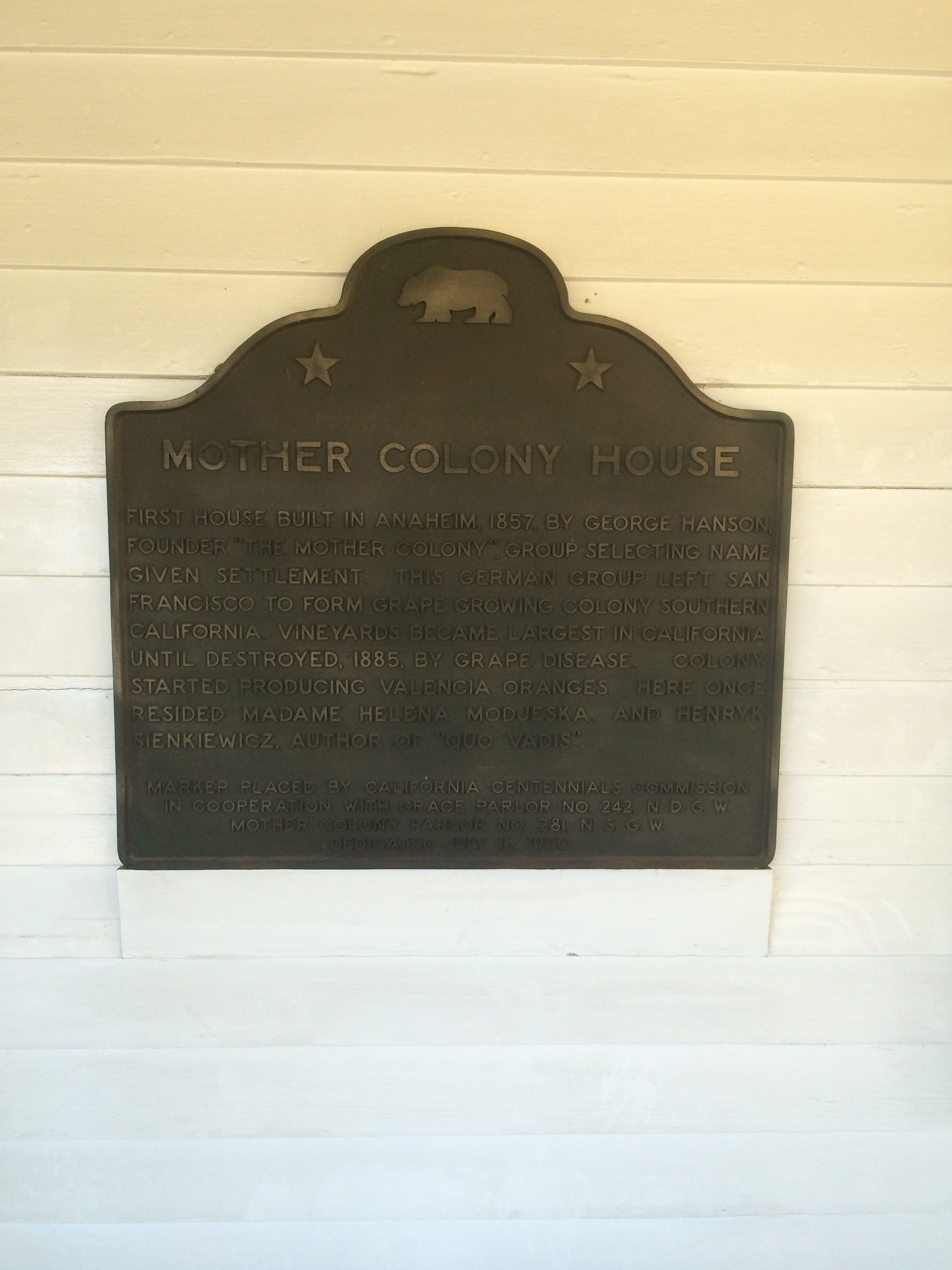
- Pioneer House of the Mother Colony Marker
- Location: Anaheim, California

History
- Built: 1857

Site notes
- Architect: George Hansen
- Architectural style: American Territorial style cottage

California Historical Landmark
- Designated: June 20, 1935
- Reference no.: 201

The Pioneer House of the Mother Colony or Anaheim first house was designated a California Historic Landmark (No.102) on June 20, 1935. The house was relocated to 414 North West Street, Anaheim in 1929 from the corner of Los Angeles Ave, now Anaheim Boulevard, and Cypress Streets. The house was built in 1857 by the colony's founder, George Hansen, a Los Angeles surveyor, known as the "Father of Anaheim". The Mother Colony is the name given to the group of a German-Americans that departed San Francisco in 1857 to start farming grapes in Southern California. Soon the colony's vineyards were the largest in California, but a fungus disease destroyed them in 1885. The colony switched to growing Valencia oranges.

Actress Helena Modjeska and author Henryk Sienkiewicz (Quo Vadis) came from the Mother Colony. In 1929, the house was taken over by the Mother Colony Chapter of the Daughters of the American Revolution. Since 1929, the house has been an Orange County museum. The City of Anaheim purchased the house in 1950, and since 1962 the Anaheim Public Library has managed it. Next to the Mother Colony house is the two-story historic John Woelke House. Modjeska House is also a California Historical Landmark.

== George Hansen ==
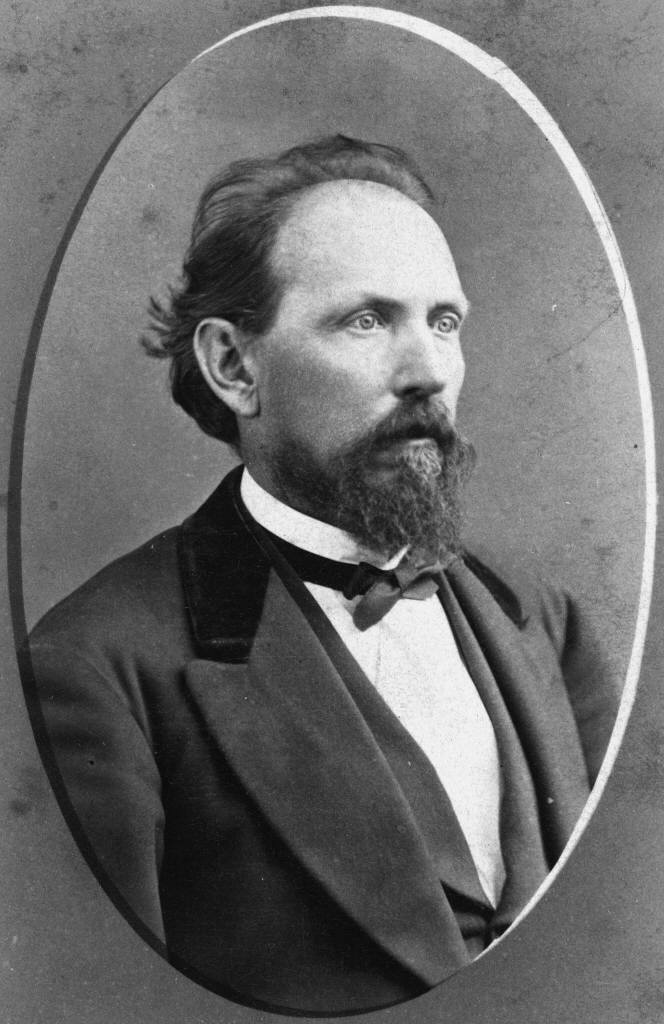
Founder of Anaheim: George Hansen

George Hansen, known as the "Father of Anaheim", was a surveyor and a civil engineer. Hansen was born in Fiume, Austria in 1824. He departed Austria in 1850 and came to California by sailing to Peru around Cape Horn. He arrived at Los Angeles in 1853.

He took out a loan of $100 and bought surveying equipment. In 1853 and 1854 his first job was to survey a large part of Los Angeles County with Major Henry Hancock. In 1868, he was president of the company that built the dam at Echo Park to provide drinking water to the Los Angeles hill houses. He moved to Orange County and designed Anaheim as head of the Los Angeles Vineyard Company. He died on November 10, 1897. He never married. His estate went to Alfred S. Solano, his adopted son and work partner. Hansen was highly educated, speaking his native German, as well as French, English and Spanish.

== Anaheim Founders' Park ==
Founders' Park has the Pioneer House of the Mother Colony and the Woelke-Stoffel House of Queen Anne style. The park also hosts city landmark 1876, a Moreton Bay fig tree, a carriage house, a vegetable garden, a small orange grove, a pump house and a windmill. These landmarks are preserved to reflect the way of life in the 1880s.

== Historic markers ==
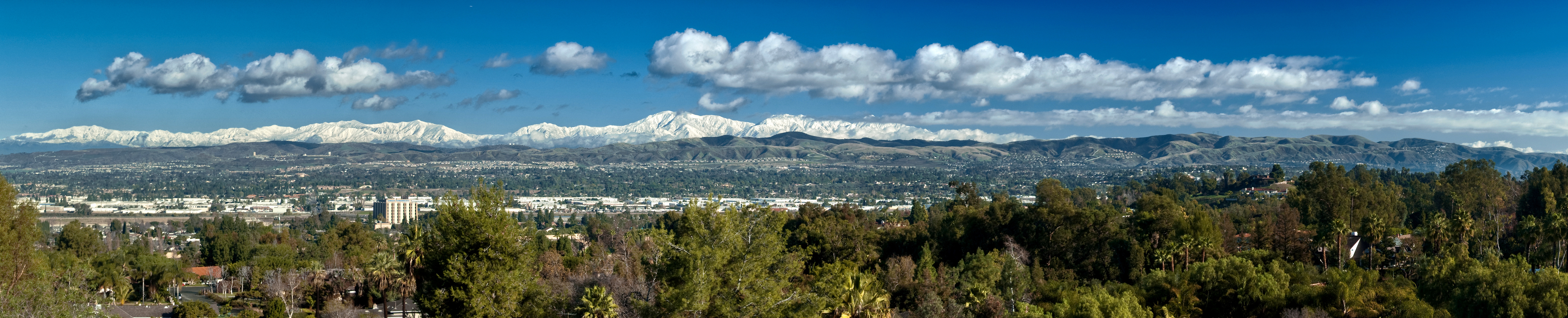
Panorama of part of East Anaheim in the Santa Ana Canyon

North Gate marker at 777 South Anaheim Boulevard, Anaheim reads "Anaheim Founded 1857, Location of North Gate" (Marker Number 112.)

North Gate marker records at Office of Historic Preservation reads: "A wall or fence of willow poles that took root and grew was planted around the Anaheim Colony to keep out the herds of wild cattle that roamed the surrounding country. Gates were erected at the north, east, south, and west ends of the two principal streets of the colony. The north gate, on the highway to Los Angeles, was the main entrance to the city."

The marker for the Pioneer House of the Mother Colony reads:

- First house built in Anaheim, 1857, by George Hansen, founder "The Mother Colony", group selecting name given settlement. This German group left San Francisco to form grape growing colony. Southern California Vineyards became largest in California until destroyed, 1885, by grape disease. Colony started producing Valencia oranges. Here once resided Madame Helena Modjeska, and Henry Sienkiewicz, author of "Quo Vadis". Erected 1950 by California Centennials Commission in cooperation with Grace Parlor No. 242, N.D.G.W., Mother Colony Parlor No. 281, N.S.G.W. (Marker Number 201.)

Marker on The Mother Colony reads "this house was built in 1857 by Mr. Geo. Hansen the promoter of that little colony of Germans who founded what is now the City of Anaheim, and originally stood on N. Los Angeles Street between Chartres & Cypress Streets. The building was a gift from Mr. E.E. Beazley and the lot on which it now stands was donated by Marie Horstmann Dwyer in memory of her parents who were pioneers and purchased the land October 1st, 1860. That the pioneers of Anaheim and what they did for us shall not be forgotten this house is preserved by the Mother Colony Chapter Daughters of the American Revolution."

== See also ==
- California Historical Landmarks in Orange County, California
