= Orange County Fire =

Orange County Fire may refer to:

- Orange County wildfire - A wildfire that occurred in Orange County, California during October 2007.
- Orange County Fire Authority - The fire department for Orange County, California.
- Orange County Fire Rescue - The fire department for Orange County, Florida.
