= Red Hill, California =

California historic landmark

Red Hill
- Location within California
- 33°45′24″N 117°47′33″W
- Location: Red Hill Elementary School, 11911 Red Hill Avenue, North Tustin, California

History
- Built: 1884

California Historical Landmark
- Designated: June 20, 1935
- Reference no.: 203

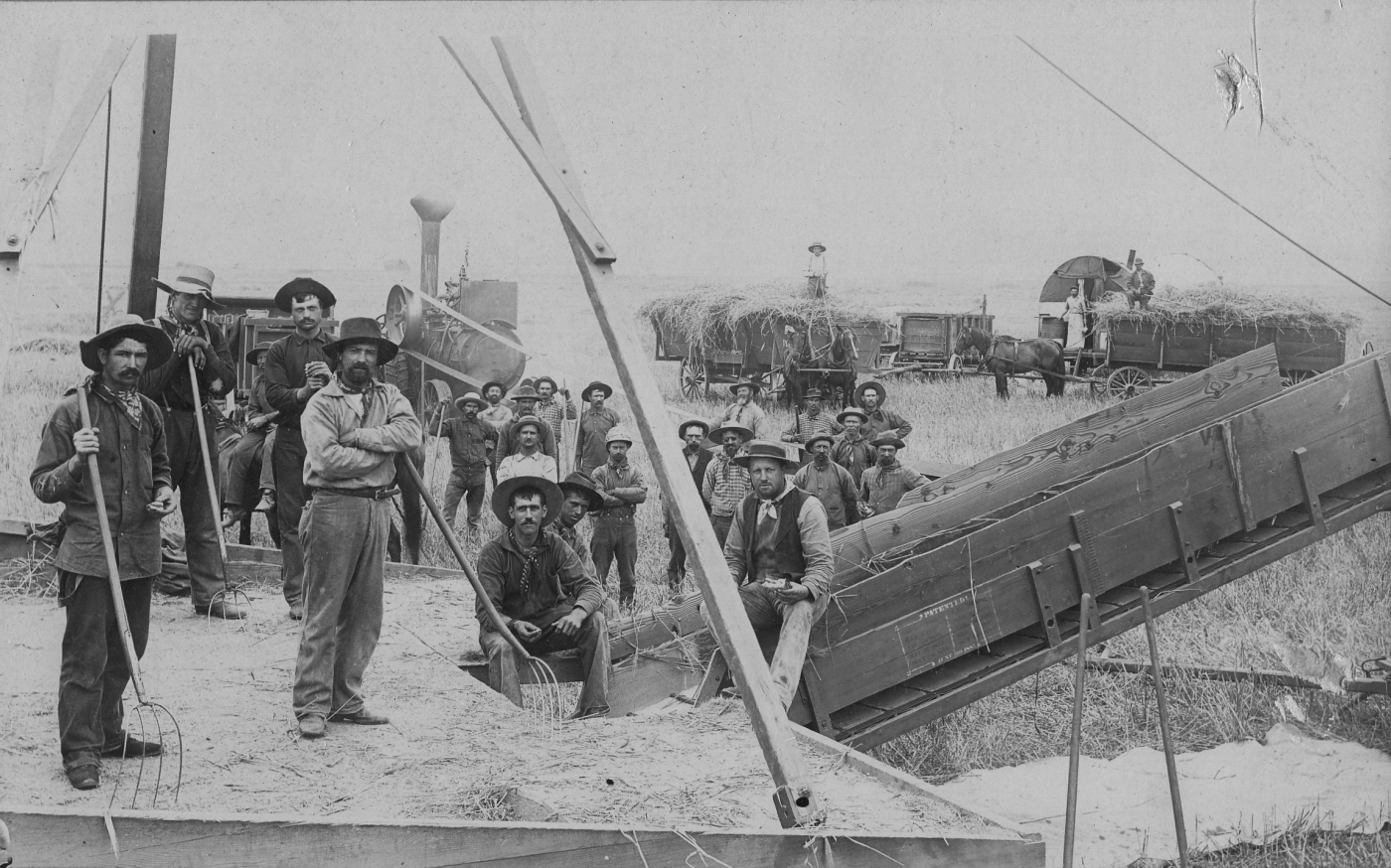
Hay harvest in 1891 on the Irvine Ranch

The place of Red Hill was designated a California Historic Landmark (No. 203) on June 20, 1935. Red Hill is in what is today North Tustin, California, Orange County. Red Hill has played an important part of history for the area. Red Hill is 347 feet tall, and 1,000 feet by 500 feet.

Local Native Indian legends tell of tribes using the hill as a safe place during floods and fires. Archeological digs have found Indian artifacts on the hill. Gabrielino Indian called the Red Hill, Katuktu which translates to place of refuge.

Under Spanish rule, the hill was called Cerrito de las Ranas, meaning Hill of the Frogs, or just Las Ranas, due to the frogs which were commonly found on the swampy side of the hill. The Spanish also called it Cerro Colorado, which translates to Red Hill.

Under the Mexican land grant system, the hill was the boundary marker between Rancho Santiago de Santa Ana, Rancho San Joaquin and Rancho Lomas de Santiago. Red Hill was on land that was part of the form Mexican land grant of José Antonio Yorba. The land was on the edge of the Rancho Santiago de Santa Ana. In 1854, the Yorba family sold Rancho Santiago de Santa Ana to José Antonio Andrés Sepúlveda. Sepúlveda later lost the land due to bankruptcy caused by fighting to uphold his land claims in court. In 1866 much of the ranch was sold to James Irvine. James Irvine starting ranching the land.

Red Hill's red soil was recognized as a source of mercury. Today we know that the red is due to high levels of cinnabar. In 1884 the first mining operation was started by the Rattlesnake Hill Mercury Mine. Red Hill is sometimes called Rattlesnake Hill from this mining operation. In 1890 the Irvine Ranch Company, took possession of the land. The Irvine Ranch Company dug two mines into the side of Red Hill and dug one 30-foot shaft down into Red Hill. In 1896 Irvine Ranch Company leased the hill to Thomas Harris, known as Shorty. Harris dug a new 70-foot shaft down the hill using Santa Clara Coal Mines workers till 1898. In 1899 E. J. Kimball and J. A. Turner signed a 10-year lease with Irvine. They had two new shafts dug removing 50 tons of ore. On Feb. 27, 1907, Red hill was sold to Felton P. Browning who mined mercury for the World War I efforts. In 1927 Charles McWalters leased Red Hill from Felton Browning. During World War II there were a few failed mining operations. Red Hill was the site of a number of abandoned mines, but most are all closed off now. The hill is now a private housing development. Red Hill continues to be a local landmark for the surrounding community, and there are a number of local entities named after it, including companies, Red Hill Avenue, a school name, a church and a fire station.

== Markers ==
Marker at the site reads:

- 'No. 203 RED HILL, In early descriptions it was known as Cerrito de las Ranas, meaning the Hill of the Frogs. In the 1890s this hill became the scene of mining excitement. Its soil composition, very red in color, had caused early American settlers to name it Red Hill. This landmark is a physical reminder of our rich State and local history.' Presented by: Michael B. Cross, Boy Scout Troop 323, April 2005

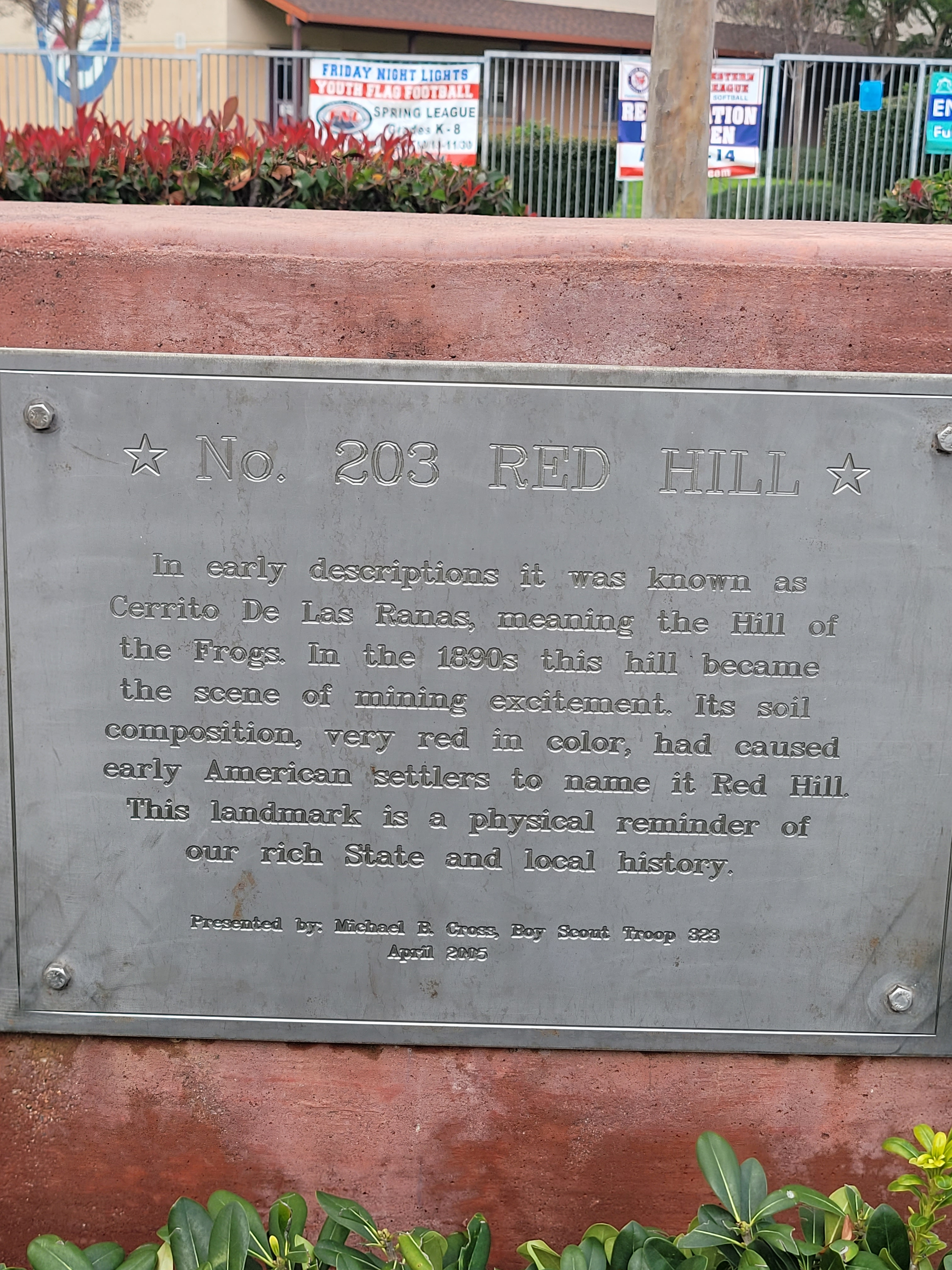

Marker 2

- A promontory which served as a landmark for early travelers. It was called "Katuktu" by the Indians. Erected 1969 by Katuktu Chapter, NSDAR. (Marker Number 203.)

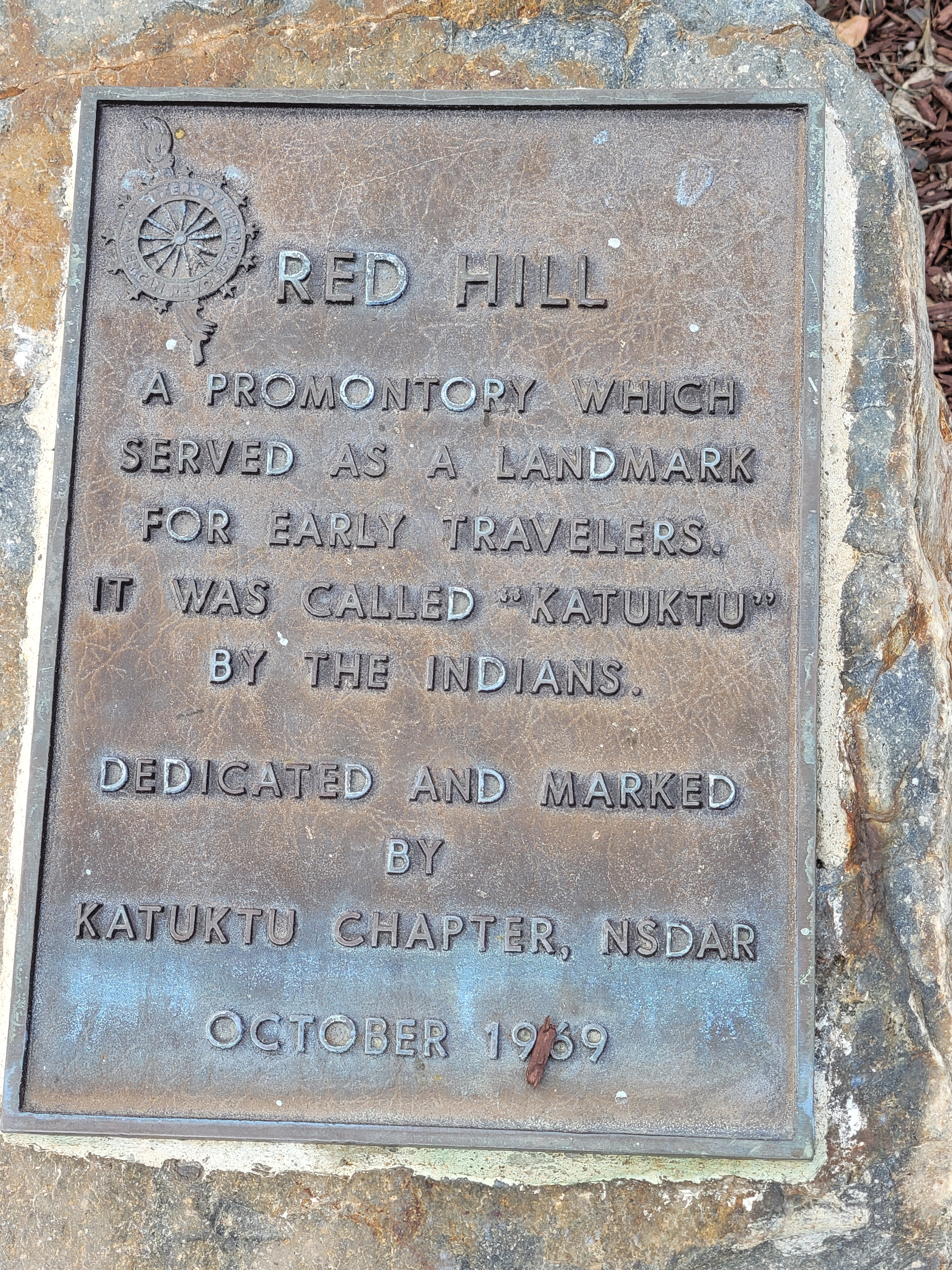

== See also ==
- California Historical Landmarks in Orange County, California
