= Orange County Fire Department =

Orange County Fire Department may refer to:

- Orange County Fire Authority, California, US
- Orange County Fire Rescue, Florida, US
