= First water-to-water flight =

California historic landmark

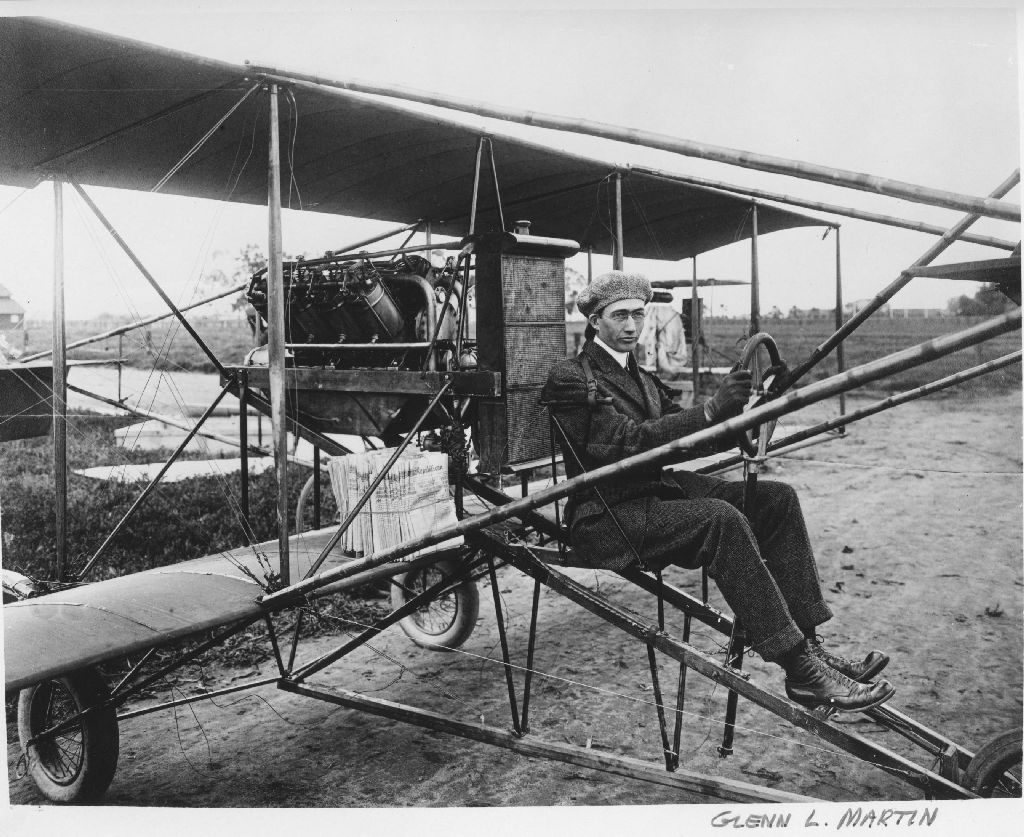
- Glenn L. Martin in a pusher-biplane 1912

- Location within California
- 33°36′03″N 117°54′00″W
- Location: near Newport Bay, California

History
- Built: 1912

Site notes
- Architect: Glenn L. Martin
- Architectural style: Early Seaplane

California Historical Landmark
- Designated: September 25, 1962
- Reference no.: 775

The place of First water-to-water flight was designated a California Historic Landmark (No.775) on September 25, 1962. On May 10, 1912, 26 year old Glenn L. Martin (January 17, 1886 – December 5, 1955) flew a self-built seaplane from Balboa Bay at Newport Bay, California to Avalon Harbor on Catalina Island, then back across the channel. His amphibian biplane, the Avalon Zipper, broke the earlier English Channel record for over-water flight. Martin's total distance was 68 miles (109 km), with the Newport-Avalon leg taking 37 minutes. Avalon Zipper had a 15-horsepower Model V Ford gasoline engine donated by Henry Ford. He picked up a bag of mail on the island on the way, and was presented with $100 ($2300 in 2011) prize for his achievement. The trip made headline news around the world. Soon regular seaplane passenger and freight services started between Catalina and the ports of Balboa, Long Beach, Wilmington and San Diego, like: Catalina Air Lines. Jim Watson, an aviation historian made a television documentary Wings Across the Channel, the Golden Age of Seaplanes on Catalina., starting with Glenn L. Martin trip.

== Markers ==
Marker at the site reads:

- On May 10, 1912, Glenn L. Martin flew his own plane, built in Santa Ana, from the waters of the Pacific Ocean at Balboa to Catalina Island. This was the first water-to-water flight, and the longest and fastest overwater flight, to that date. On his return to the mainland, Martin carried the day's mail from Catalina-another first.

== See also ==
- California Historical Landmarks in Orange County, California
- Amphibious aircraft
- Floatplane
- Flying boat
- List of seaplanes and amphibious aircraft
- List of seaplane operators
