= John Woelke House =

- Woelke-Stoffel House
- U.S. National Register of Historic Places
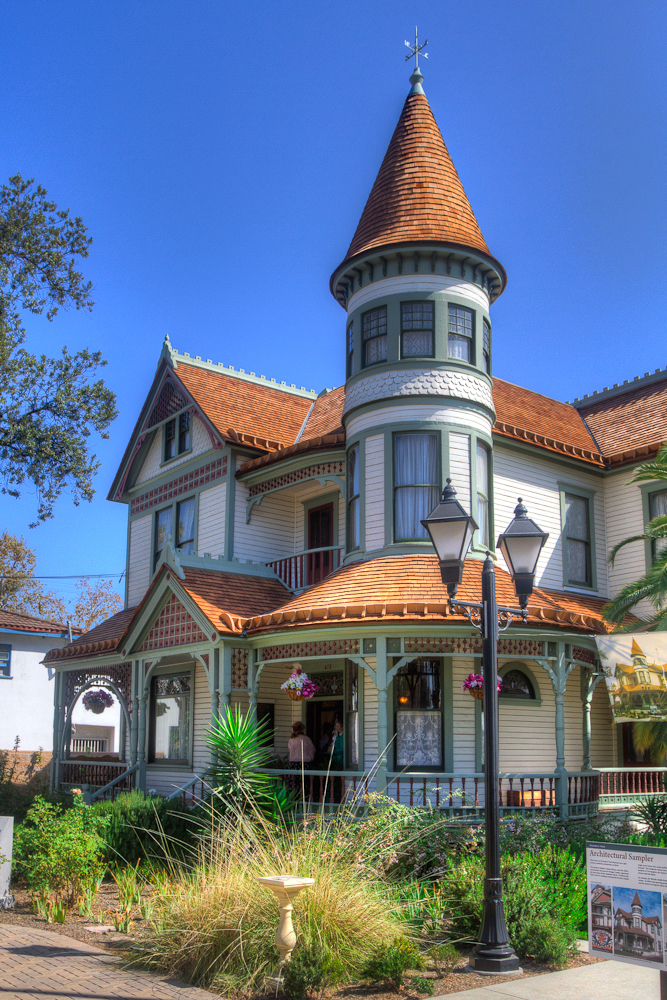
- Queen Anne style entrance facade.

- Location within California
- Location: 400 N. West St., Anaheim, California
- Coordinates: 33°50′11.26″N 117°55′41.01″W
- Built: 1896
- Architectural style: Queen Anne — Victorian architecture
- NRHP reference No.: 13000474
- Added to NRHP: July 8, 2013

The Woelke-Stoffel House is a two-story Queen Anne style home in Anaheim, California, United States. It was constructed in 1896 by architects George Franklin Barber and Armstrong Davis Porter. The home is now owned by the City of Anaheim and part of Founders Park, in which sits a collection of historical buildings and acts as a museum. Free public tours are available on the 3rd Saturday of every month. Its location with close proximity to the Disneyland Resort makes it a popular tourist destination in the area. It was listed on the National Register of Historic Places on July 8, 2013. The house is in the Anaheim Founders' Park. Founders' Park also has the Pioneer House of the Mother Colony house built by the city's founder George Hanson . At the park is also a city landmark 1876 Moreton Bay Fig tree, a large Carriage House in Queen Anne style, vegetable garden, small orange grove, a Pump House and windmill.
