= Chip Prather =

American fire chief

Charles "Chip" Prather
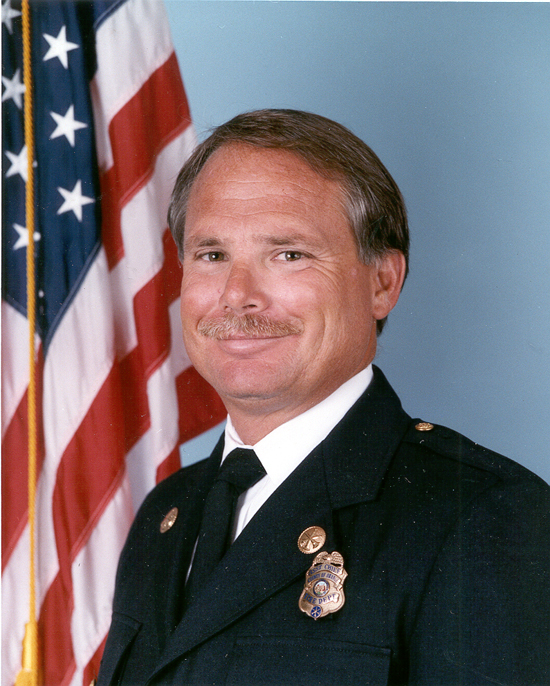
- Former OCFA Chief Chip Prather

Orange County Fire Authority, United States
- In service 1970–2009
- Rank: Sworn in as a Firefighter - 1970; Paramedic, Engineer - 1975; Captain - 1980; Captain, EMS Coordinator - 1980-1981; Battalion Chief - 1982; Division Chief - 1989; Assistant Fire Chief - 1990; Fire Chief - 1997-2009

Personal details
- Born: 1953 (age 72–73) United States
- Relations: Married
- Awards: Firefighter of the Year (1995), Fire Chief of the Year (2002), Boy Scouts Spurgeon Award (2000)

Charles Prather (born 1953) is an American former firefighter who became the second Fire Chief of the Orange County Fire Authority (OCFA) in California, United States.

== Early life ==
Charles Prather is the son of the late Charles W. Prather, longtime chief of the University of California, Davis Fire Department from the 1950s to the 1980s.

The younger Prather began his career in 1970 as a seasonal firefighter with the California Department of Forestry, now known as California Department of Forestry and Fire Protection (CAL Fire).

== Career ==
Prather was named Fire Chief of the Orange County Fire Authority on October 1, 1997.

Prather's leadership was characterized by direct community involvement. He frequently addressed criticism directly, responding to online critics and answering complaints from firefighters in person. He received numerous accolades from state and federal agencies as well as a resolution approved by the Orange County Board of Directors on June 25, 2009.

=== Programs ===
During his tenure as chief, Prather developed or expanded instrumental safety programs, including:

- Paramedic Assessment Unit Program
- Urban Search and Rescue Team
- Helicopter Program
- Safety Officer Response Plan
- Automatic External Defibrillator Program
- Swift Water Rescue Team
- Technical Truck Program
- WEFIT Program
- Occupant Liaison Program.

These programs greatly increased the status and quality of Orange County's regional fire protection, and attracted other departments to emulate these procedures (including Japan).

=== Facilities ===
Prather led the project to create a new department headquarters; the project was completed in 2004. The Regional Fire Operations and Training Center (RFOTC) was completed in June 2004, moving the OCFA from Water Street in Orange, California, to the northeast border of Irvine, California. The training center includes a six-story tower for remote fire simulation, swiftwater rescue canals, train tracks, an airplane fuselage for mass casualty incident training, and an underground dispatch center designed to withstand seismic shifts of up to 18 inches. Its construction was a complex project involving the efforts of many stakeholders.

Prather oversaw the Federal Emergency Management Agency Urban search and rescue Task Force (CA-TF5), one of eight in California and 28 in the United States. In November 2008, Prather expanded this program by adding the first nationally certified canine and handler team in Orange County.

== Safety, prevention, and education ==
Prather has helped Orange County's cities become some of the safest in the US. Irvine for example, is served by over eight stations, and was ranked the number one safest city in America for four years in a row (for a population over 100,000).
