= Modjeska House =

Historic house in California, United States

Coordinates: 33°42′32.4″N 117°37′30″W

- Arden - Helena Modjeska's Home
- U.S. National Register of Historic Places
- U.S. National Historic Landmark
- California Historical Landmark No. 205
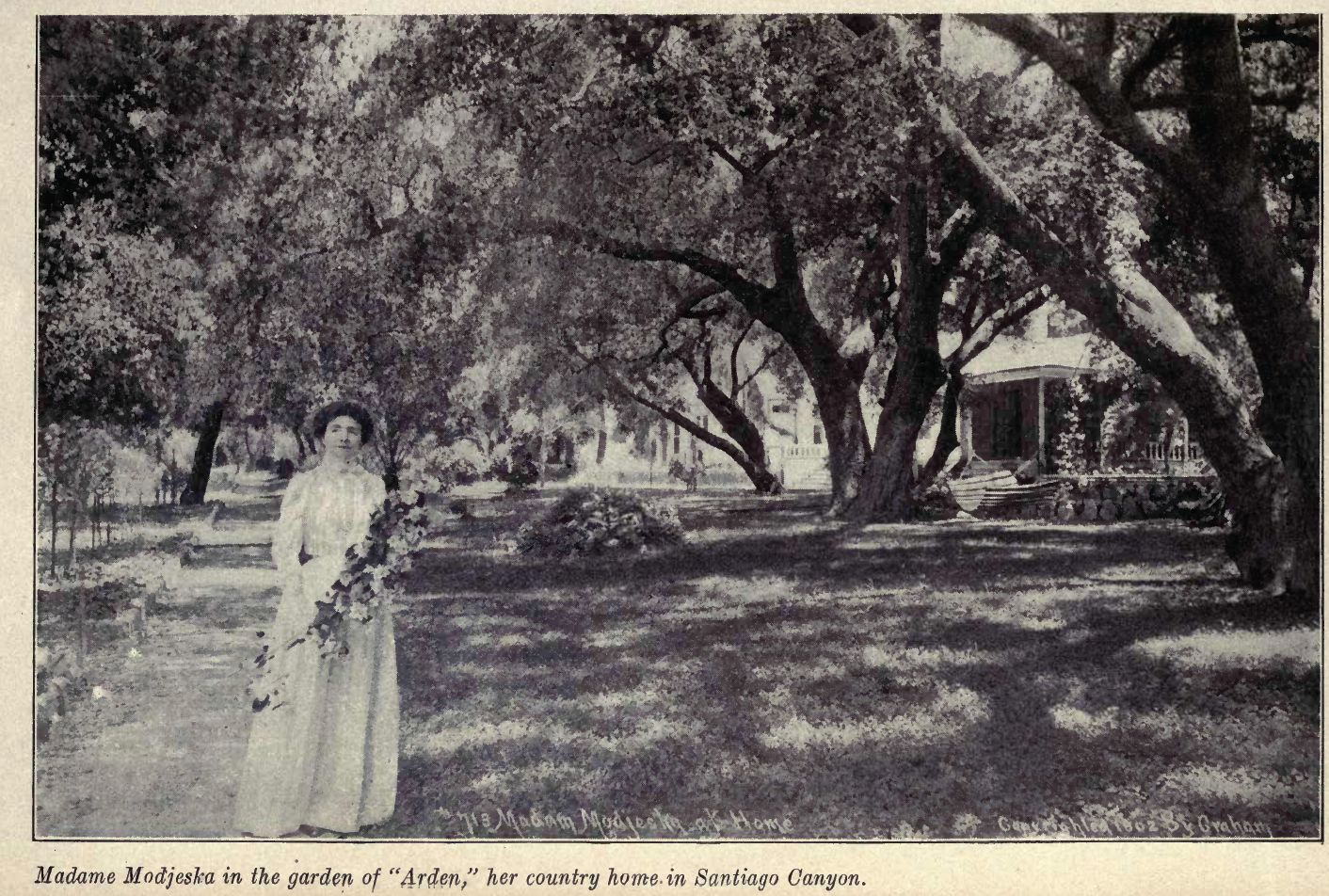
- Madame Helena Modjeska in the garden at "Arden"

- Location within California Location within the United States
- Location: 29042 Modjeska Canyon Road; Modjeska, California
- Area: 14 acres (57,000 m^{2})
- Built: 1888
- Architect: Stanford White
- Architectural style: Queen Anne
- NRHP reference No.: 72000244
- CHISL No.: 205

Significant dates
- Added to NRHP: December 11, 1972
- Designated NHL: December 14, 1990
- Designated CHISL: 1935

Arden, also known as The Modjeska House, is a historic home designed by Stanford White in Modjeska Canyon, California. It is significant for being the only surviving home of Helena Modjeska, a Shakespearean actress and Polish patriot. The property is located in a live oak grove on the banks of Santiago Creek in Modjeska Canyon, California.

== History ==
Modjeska came to America with her husband Karol Bozenta Chłapowski in 1876 from Poland, and created a retreat for when she was not performing on stage. To design a large Victorian country house, she hired one of America's leading architects, Stanford White. They named it "Arden" after the forest setting of Shakespeare's play As You Like It and planted gardens with olive trees, palms, roses, oleander and lilac. It was their home from 1888 until 1906.

=== Post-Modjeska years ===
After the property was sold, the romance associated with Modjeska's life attracted developers who marketed parcels of the property for vacation homes. In 1908, Gustave A. Schweiger bought the home and operated it as a bed and breakfast. In 1922, local Rotary groups discussed buying the property to use as a country club. In 1923, the Walker family of Long Beach purchased parcels of land in the canyon that included the Modjeska house and its surrounding wooded area.

=== Historic site ===
Modjeska House was declared a California Historical Landmark in 1935.

In 1986, the Orange County Harbors, Beaches and Parks Authority, now called OC Parks, purchased the 14.4-acre property for $1 million and established it as a historical site. A major restoration occurred before the site could be opened to the public. The original house had no indoor plumbing or utilities. The grounds are open four days a week and tours of the home are available by appointment. Contact the park to make a reservation.

It was declared a National Historic Landmark in 1990.

The house was featured in Visiting... with Huell Howser Episode 920.

== Marker ==
Marker at the site reads:

- Famous as the home of Madame Modjeska, one of the world's great actresses, it was designed by Stanford White in 1888 on property called the Forest of Arden. Sold soon after her retirement, it remains a monument to the woman who contributed immeasurably to the cultural life of Orange County. Erected by California State Park Commission. (Marker Number 205.)

== Gallery ==
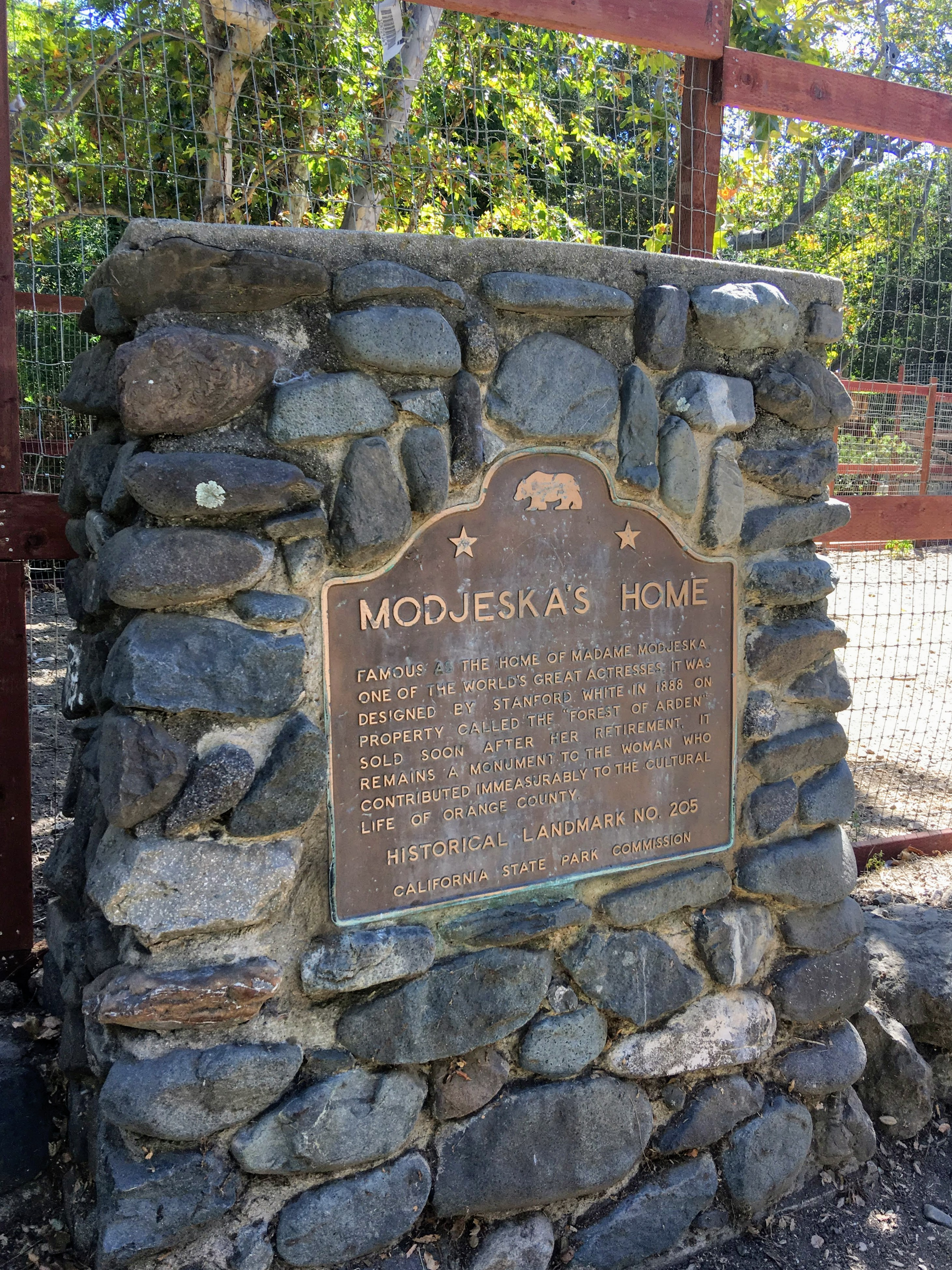
Modjeska House marker

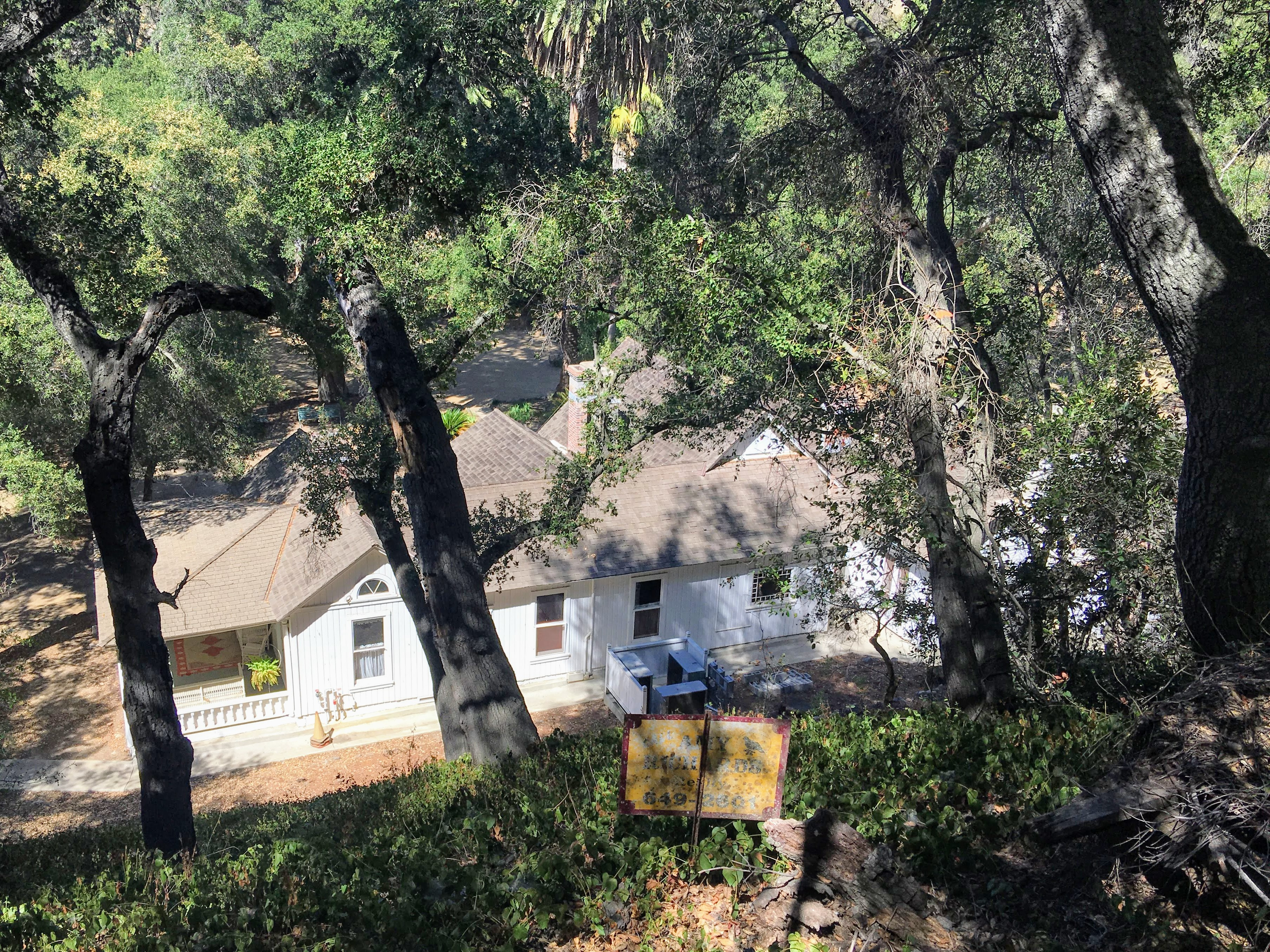
Modjeska House

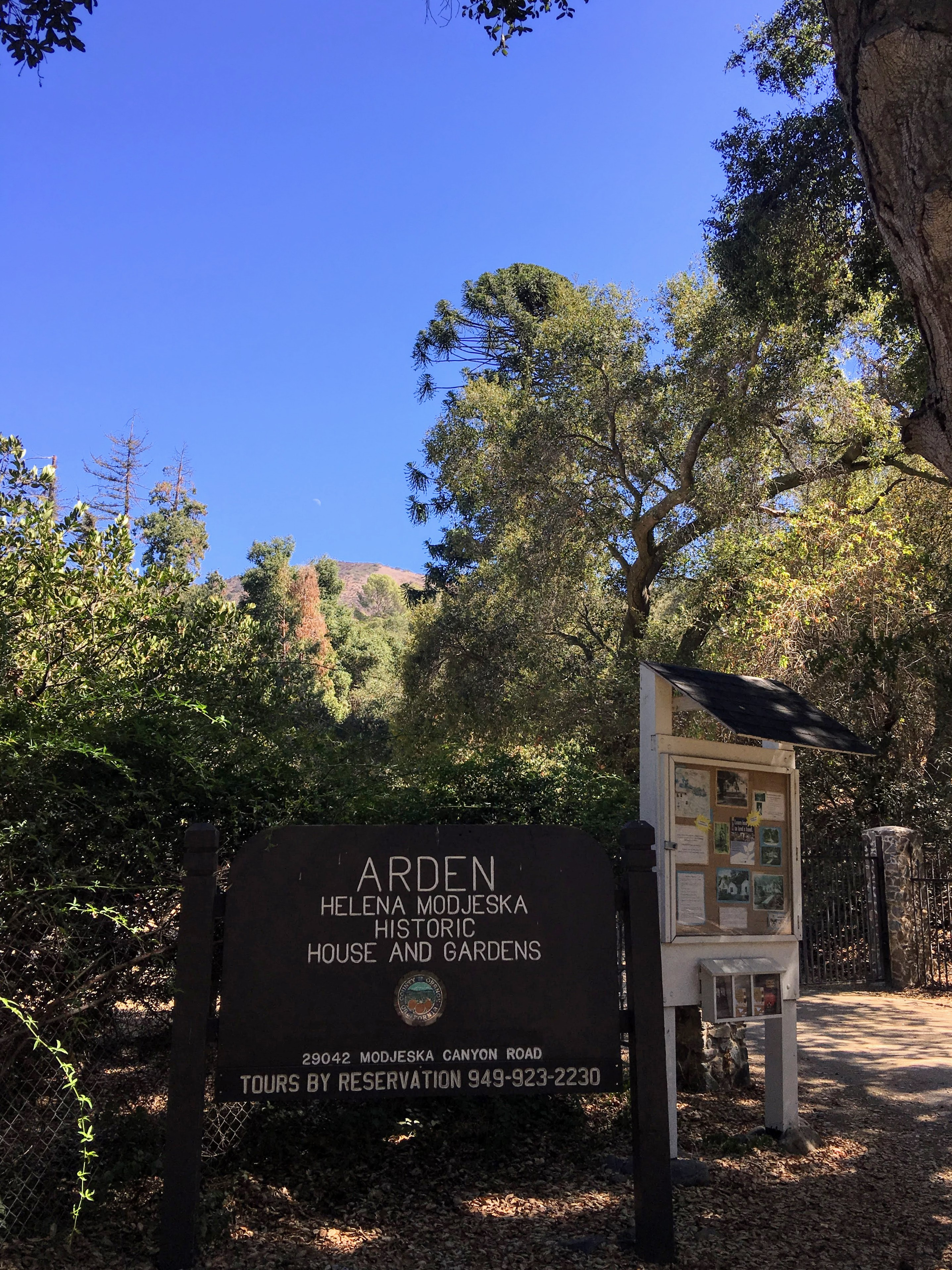
Modjeska House

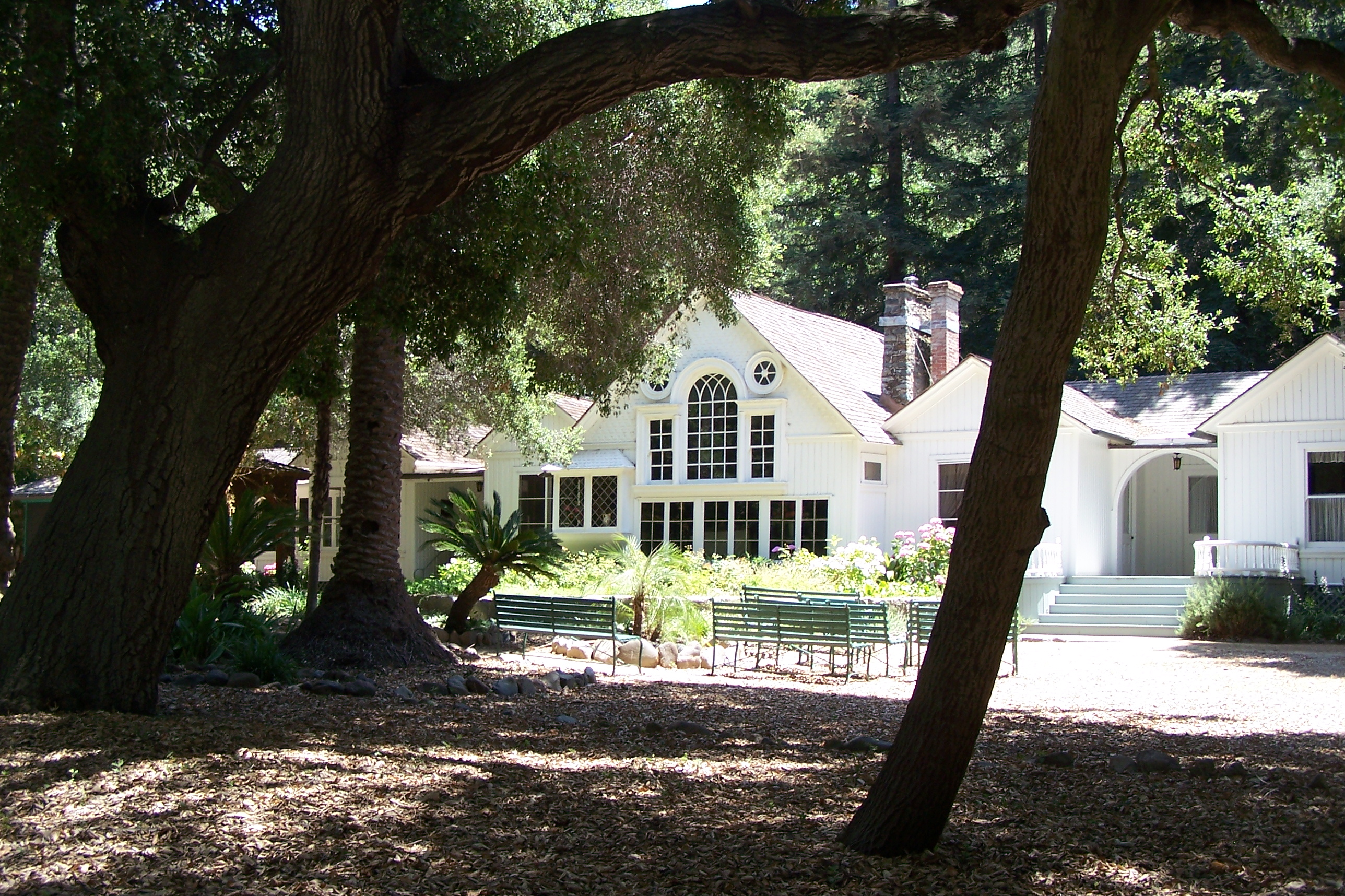
Modjeska House

== See also ==
- California Historical Landmarks in Orange County, California
