= Silverado, California =

Census-designated place in California, United States

- Unincorporated community Census-designated place
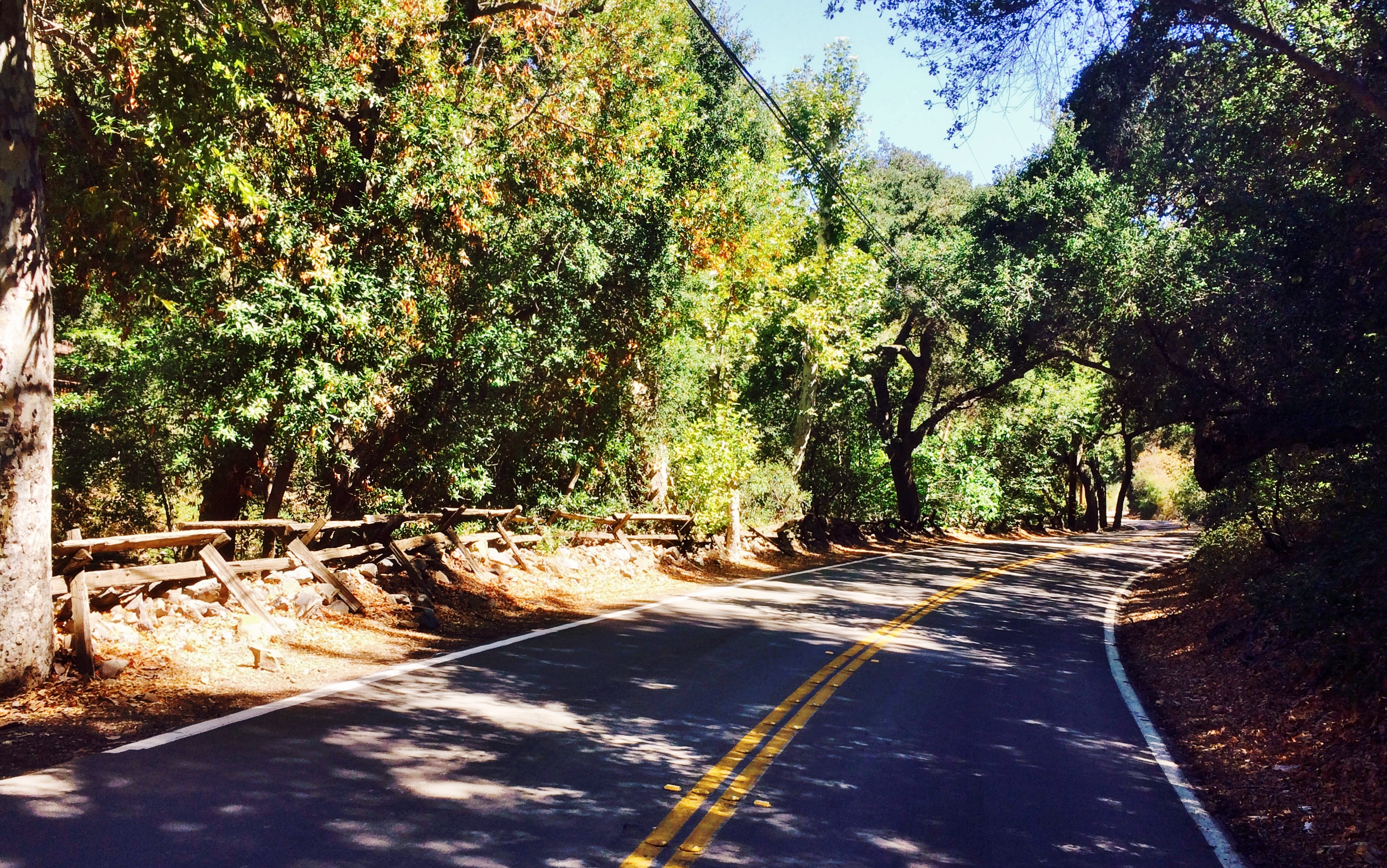
- Silverado Canyon Road, 2015

- Location within California Location within the United States
- Coordinates: 33°44′53″N 117°37′43″W
- Country: United States
- State: California
- County: Orange

Area
  - Total: 5.719 sq mi (14.81 km^{2})
  - Land: 5.719 sq mi (14.81 km^{2})
  - Water: 0 sq mi (0 km^{2})
- Elevation: 1,677 ft (511 m)

Population
  - Total: 932
  - Density: 163/sq mi (62.9/km^{2})
- Time zone: UTC-8 (PST)
  - Summer (DST): UTC-7 (PDT)
- ZIP code: 92676
- Area code: 714
- GNIS feature ID: 2805252

California Historical Landmark
- Reference no.: 202

Silverado is an unincorporated community and census-designated place (CDP) in Silverado Canyon, which is located in the Santa Ana Mountains in eastern Orange County, California, United States. Portions of the town sit on the former Mexican land grant Rancho Lomas de Santiago. Silverado is located at the boundaries of Cleveland National Forest. The site is a California Historical Landmark, and is located near the village site of Puhú.

As of the 2020 census, Silverado had a population of 932.

== History ==
Silverado was founded in 1878. The area was mined for silver during the late 19th and early 20th centuries. Remnants of mining operations such as the Blue Light Mine are still scattered in the area. Timber was harvested for use by the railroad. Coal was mined at the time in Carbondale. Ancient sea life fossils can be found within the sandstone cliffs in the area. During Spanish rule, the canyon was visited by Spanish explorers and was known by the name Cañada de la Madera (Timber Canyon). The town in Spain by that name bears a remarkable resemblance to Silverado. (The name Silverado is a type of Spanglish indicating a place where silver is found; a parallel formation to El Dorado.) The area enjoyed a renaissance in popularity in the 1940s as a hot springs vacation retreat, during which time hotels and restaurants prospered. Many weekend cabins were also built at that time. Home to a number of artists and craftsmen, the town now consists of about 2,000 residents, a general store, a cafe, a public library, a church, two fire stations, a community center, and a post office. It hosts summer concerts, an annual Country Fair, and an Easter breakfast. A local landmark near Silverado is Cook's Corner, a bar popular with motorcyclists.

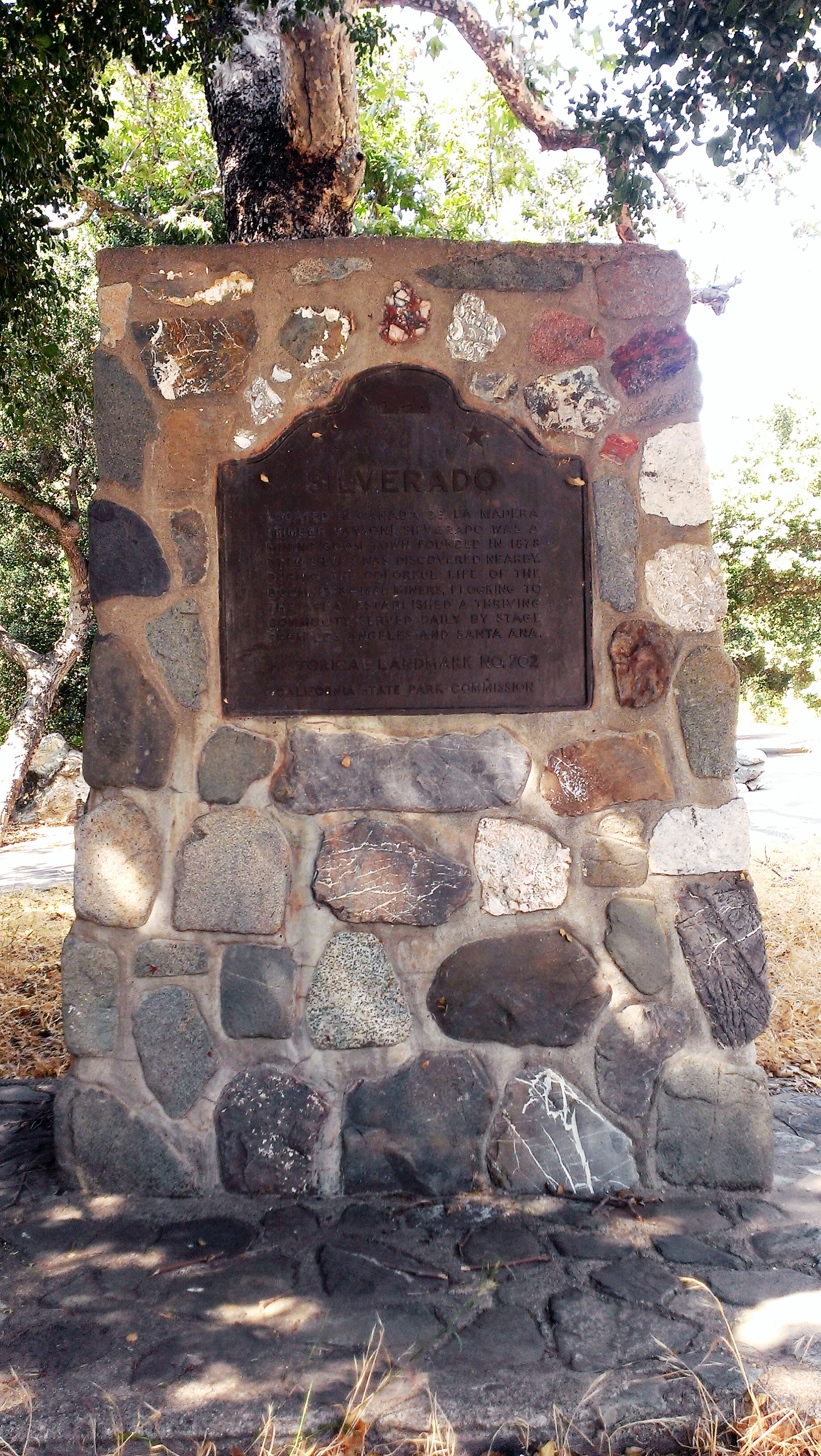
Silverado California Historical Landmark 202

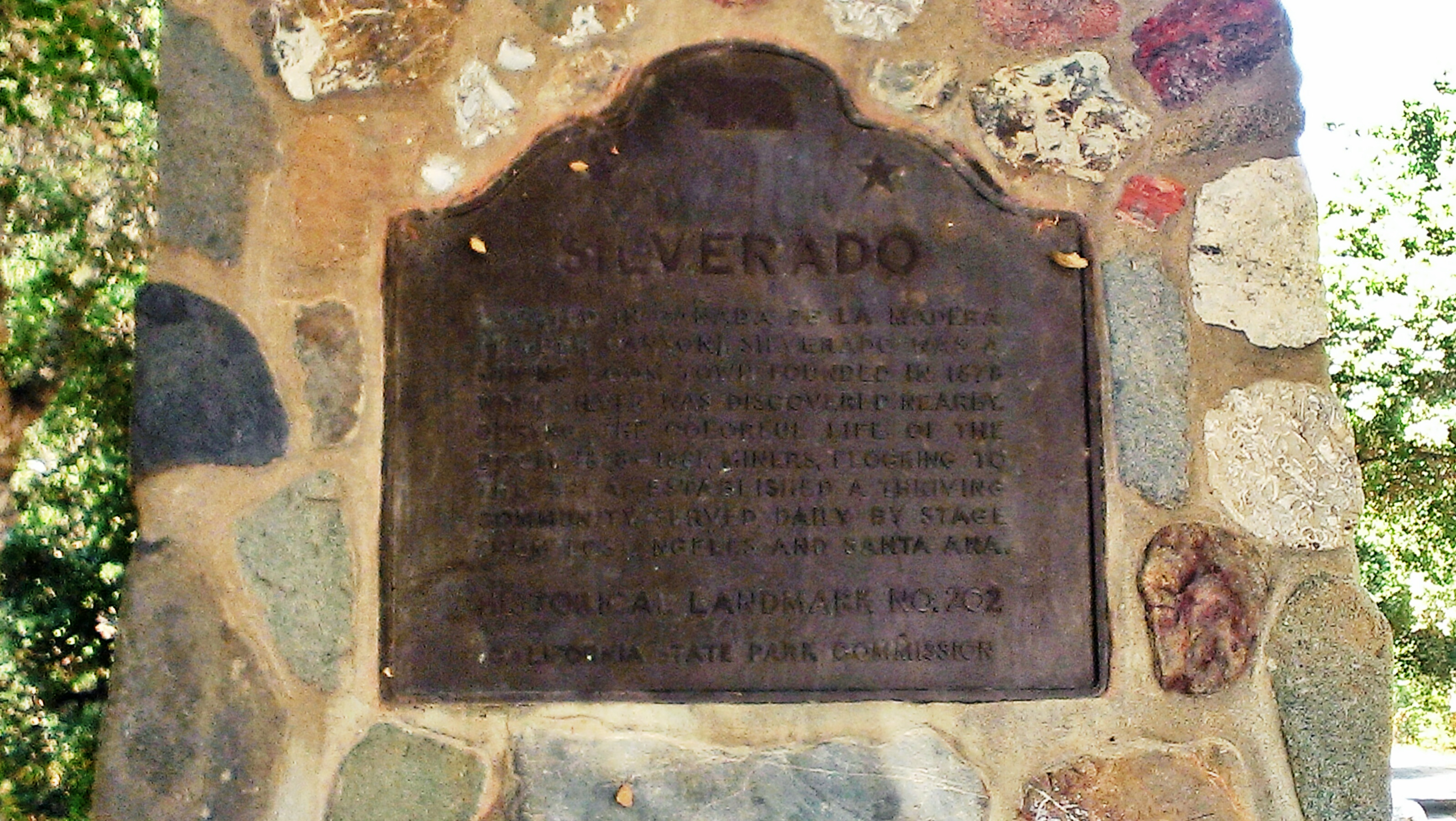
Silverado California Historical Landmark 202

Torrential rains from Pacific storms in 1939, and again in 1969, washed away homes and devastated roads and bridges. The latter storm resulted in a number of flood related casualties. On October 26, 2007, the Orange County Fire Authority issued a mandatory evacuation of the area due to the Santiago Fire. In September 2014, a fire burned approximately 1,000 acres (400 ha) within the canyon. However, no structures were lost.

Today new homes and developments from nearby urban areas are encroaching on the canyons. The largest proposed projects are by the Irvine Company, which plans to build two developments stretching along Santiago Canyon Road from Jamboree Road past Irvine Lake.

=== Marker ===
Marker at the site reads:

- Located in Cañada de la Madera (Timber Canyon), Silverado was a mining boom town founded in 1878 when silver was discovered nearby. During the colorful life of the boom, 1878-1881, miners, flocking to the area, established a thriving community, served daily by stage from Los Angeles and Santa Ana. Erected by California State Park Commission. (Marker Number 202.)

== Demographics ==
Historical population
Census	Pop.	Note	%±
2020	932		—
U.S. Decennial Census; 2020

For statistical purposes, the United States Census Bureau first listed Silverado as a census-designated place (CDP) in the 2020 census.

=== 2020 census ===
Silverado, California - Demographic Profile Note: the US Census treats Hispanic/Latino as an ethnic category. This table excludes Latinos from the racial categories and assigns them to a separate category. Hispanics/Latinos may be of any race.
Race / Ethnicity (NH = Non-Hispanic)	Pop 2020	% 2020
White alone (NH)	736	78.97%
Black or African American alone (NH)	3	0.32%
Native American or Alaska Native alone (NH)	4	0.43%
Asian alone (NH)	23	2.47%
Pacific Islander alone (NH)	4	0.43%
Other race alone (NH)	7	0.75%
Mixed race or Multiracial (NH)	38	4.08%
Hispanic or Latino (any race)	117	12.55%
Total	932	100.00%

== See also ==
- California Historical Landmarks in Orange County, California
- Puhú (former village)
