= Carbondale, Georgia =

- unincorporated community
- Location within Georgia
- Coordinates: 34°36′N 85°00′W
- Country: United States
- State: Georgia
- County: Whitfield
- Elevation: 768 ft (234 m)
- Time zone: UTC-5 (Eastern (EST))
  - Summer (DST): UTC-4 (EDT)
- ZIP code: 30710
- GNIS feature ID: 354990

Carbondale is an unincorporated community in Whitfield County, in the U.S. state of Georgia.

== History ==
An early variant name was "Cove City Post Office". A post office called Cove City was established in 1870, the name was changed to Carbondale in 1904, and the post office closed in 1907. The present name is for the coaling station at the town site, coal being a carbon-based fuel.
