= Modjeska Canyon, California =

Census-designated place in California, United States

- Unincorporated community Census-designated place
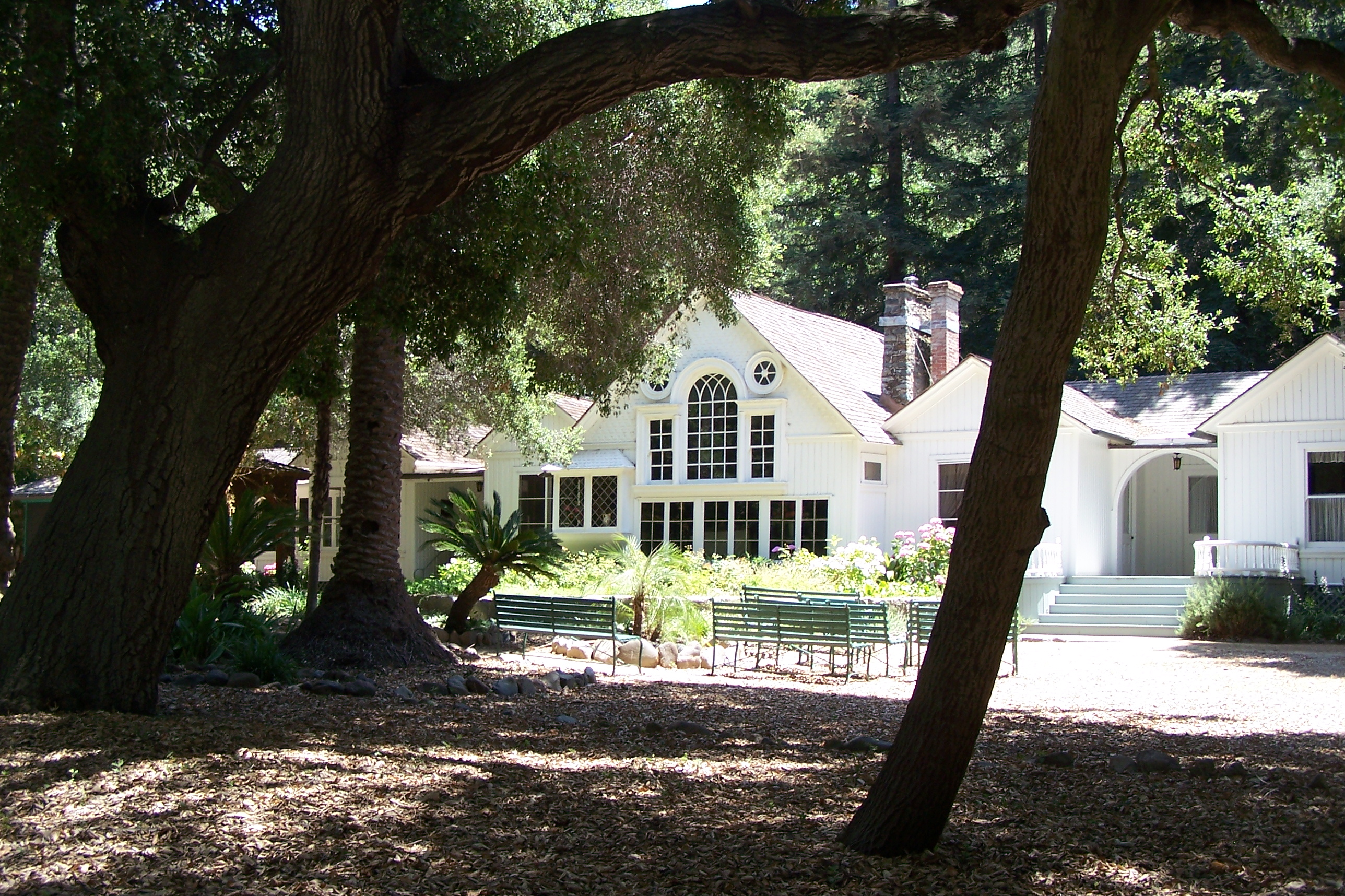
- The Modjeska House, a historical landmark in the community

- Location within California Location within the United States
- Coordinates: 33°42′39″N 117°38′32″W
- Country: United States
- State: California
- County: Orange
- Named for: Helena Modjeska

Area
  - Total: 2.004 sq mi (5.19 km^{2})
  - Land: 2.004 sq mi (5.19 km^{2})
  - Water: 0 sq mi (0 km^{2})
- Elevation: 1,312 ft (400 m)

Population (2020)
  - Total: 632
  - Density: 315/sq mi (122/km^{2})
- Time zone: UTC-8 (PST)
  - Summer (DST): UTC-7 (PDT)
- ZIP code: 92676
- Area code: 714
- GNIS feature ID: 2805246

Modjeska Canyon is an unincorporated community and census-designated place (CDP) on the western slope of the Santa Ana Mountains in eastern Orange County, California, United States. It is a suburban community of several hundred residents, with a small park and a volunteer fire station. The ZIP Code is 92676, and the community is served by area code 714.

The canyon is also the location of the Tucker Wildlife Sanctuary. Most of the canyon is bordered by the Cleveland National Forest. The community of Modjeska is very tight knit, hosting several in-canyon events, such as pot lucks, dance lessons, movie nights at the park, Fourth of July parades, as well as Christmas and Halloween parties. The parties are usually held in the Modjeska Community Center and the Fire Station. They also hold events for non-residents to come and enjoy, such as an arts and crafts fair held in early spring at the Tucker Wildlife Sanctuary.

== History ==
Modjeska is named after the 19th-century Polish stage actress, mother of the famous bridge engineer Ralph Modjeski, Helena Modjeska, who settled in the canyon in the late 19th century. Her home from 1888 to 1906, "Arden", is a National Historic Landmark. The house and gardens are private; therefore, reservations are required for a tour of the property. The house is typically open only once or twice a month.

Mary Teegarden Clark, an early resident of nearby Orange, described a late 1800s community picnic in Modjeska in her memoirs, Pioneer Ranch Life in Orange.

== Demographics ==
Historical population
Census	Pop.	Note	%±
2020	632		—
U.S. Decennial Census; 2020

For statistical purposes, the United States Census Bureau first listed Modjeska as a census-designated place (CDP) in the 2020 census.

=== 2020 census ===
Modjeska, California – Racial and ethnic composition Note: the US Census treats Hispanic/Latino as an ethnic category. This table excludes Latinos from the racial categories and assigns them to a separate category. Hispanics/Latinos may be of any race.
Race / Ethnicity (NH = Non-Hispanic)	Pop 2020	% 2020
White alone (NH)	449	71.04%
Black or African American alone (NH)	1	0.16%
Native American or Alaska Native alone (NH)	9	1.42%
Asian alone (NH)	20	3.16%
Native Hawaiian or Pacific Islander alone (NH)	1	0.16%
Other race alone (NH)	2	0.32%
Mixed race or Multiracial (NH)	48	7.59%
Hispanic or Latino (any race)	102	16.14%
Total	632	100.00%

The Brotherhood of Eternal Love was incorporated as a non-profit organization in Modjeska on Oct 26, 1966 — a few months before John Griggs and other founding members relocated to the Woodland Drive neighborhood of Laguna Beach, CA (later known as 'Dodge City').

== Wildfires ==
The canyon was affected by the Santiago Fire. About 14 homes in Modjeska were destroyed by the fire and another 8 homes were damaged (out of a total of roughly 220 homes in the canyon). Mandatory evacuations were issued prior to President George W. Bush declaring the site an emergency.

During the Bond Fire, Modjeska Canyon was one of the first communities to be evacuated due to their proximity to Silverado Canyon, where the wildfire originated.

== Gallery ==
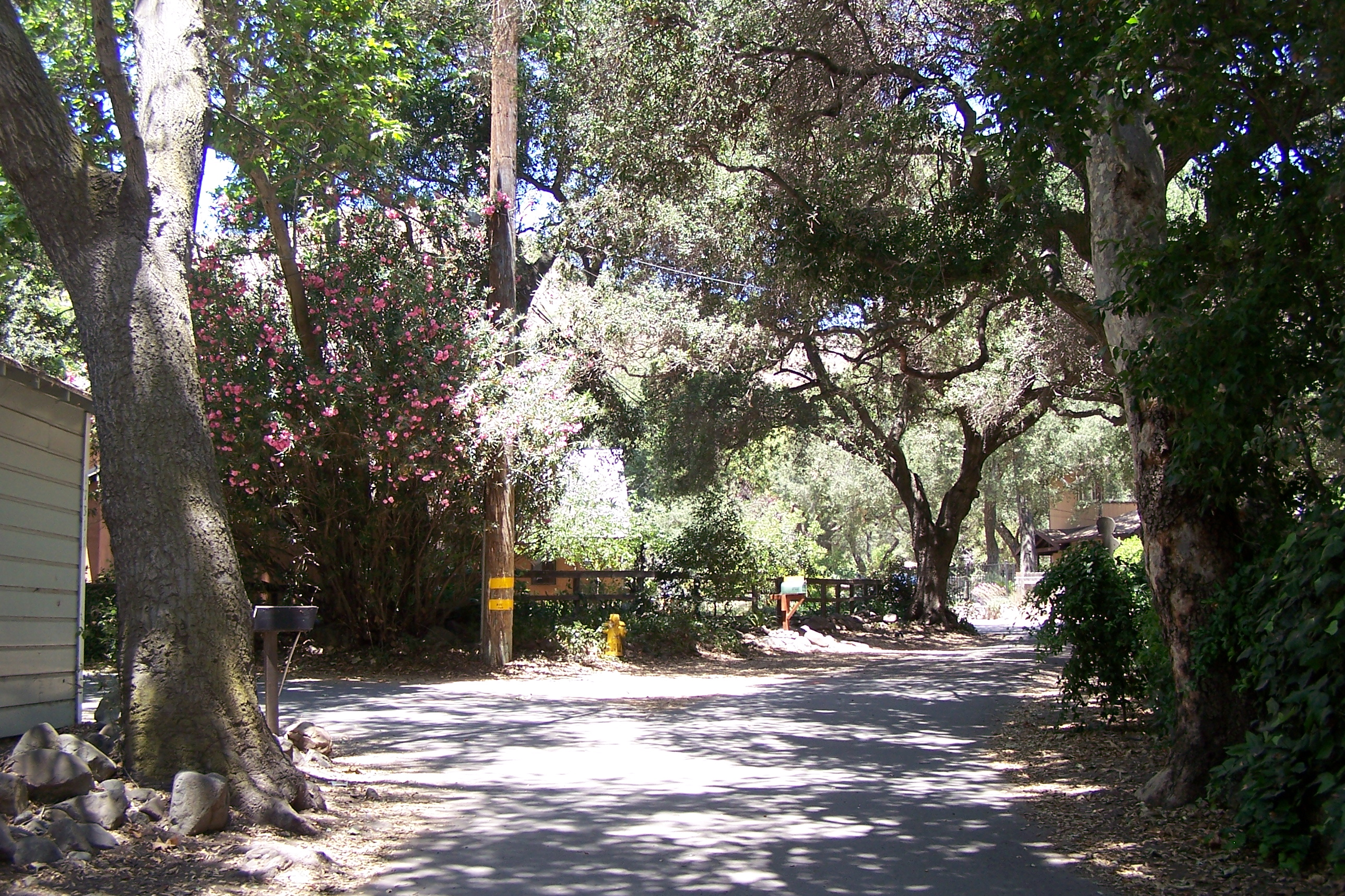
Side street

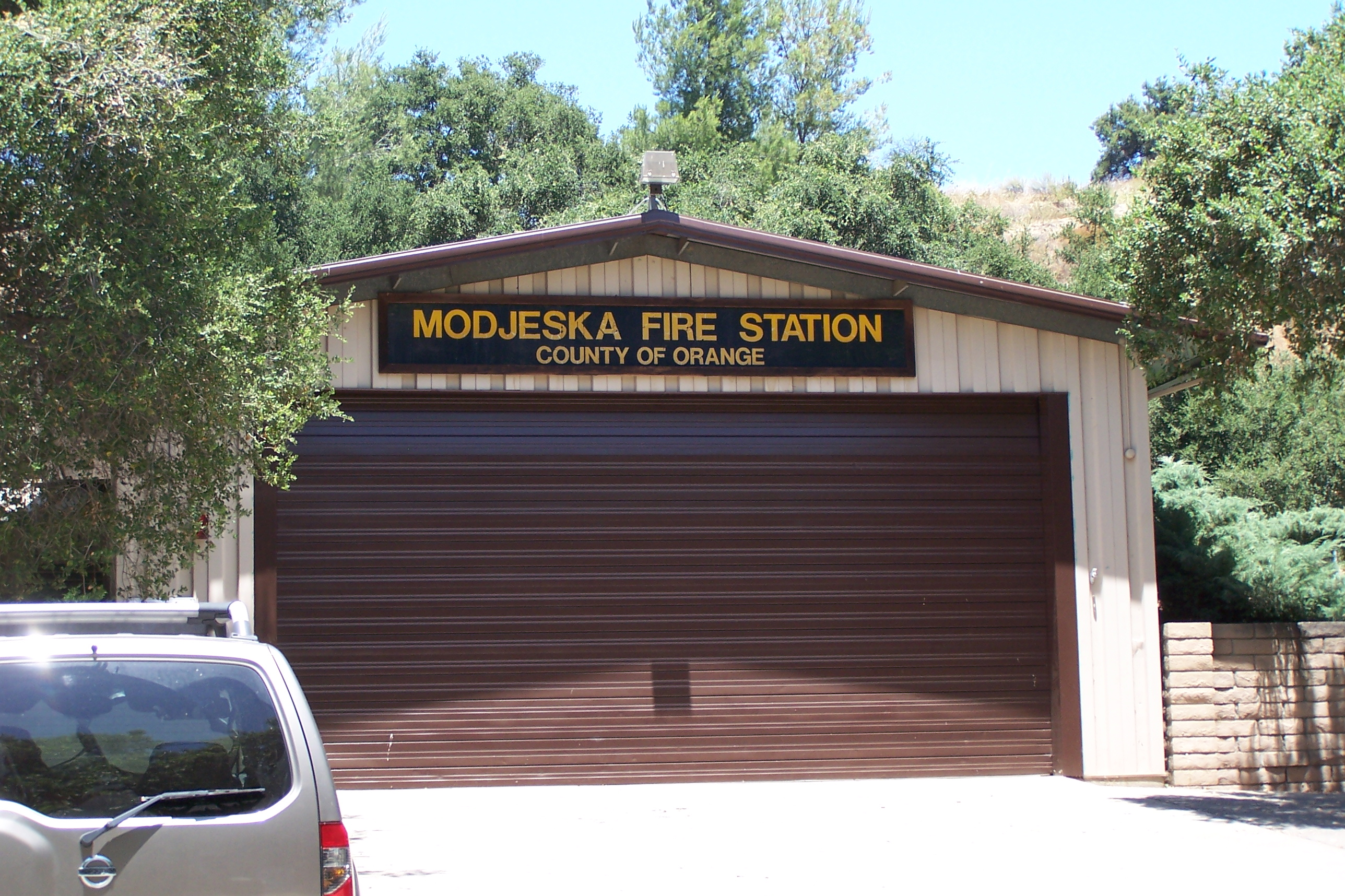
Modjeska Fire House
