= Orange County Fire Authority =

Fire department of Orange County, California, United States

Coordinates: 33.74720°N 117.76666°W

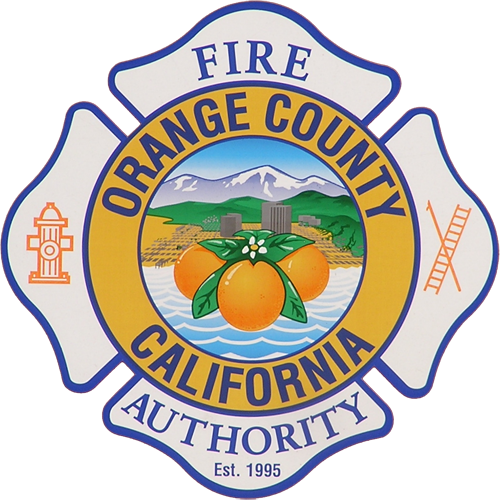

Operational area
- Country: United States
- State: California
- County: Orange

Agency overview
- Established: March 1, 1995
- Annual calls: 183,165 (2025)
- Annual budget: ~$555,800,000 (2026)
- Staffing: 1,544 full-time personnel 189 reserve personnel
- Fire chief: TJ McGovern
- IAFF: 3631

Facilities and equipment
- Divisions: 7
- Battalions: 11
- Stations: 78
- Engines: 136
- Tillers: 11
- Platforms: 3
- Ladders: 5
- Squads: 2
- Rescues: 1
- Tenders: 5
- HAZMAT: 4
- USAR: 4
- Airport crash: 7
- Wildland: 28
- Bulldozers: 2
- Helicopters: 4

Website
- Official website
- IAFF website

The Orange County Fire Authority (OCFA) is the joint powers authority that provides fire protection and emergency medical services for unincorporated areas of Orange County and 23 contract cities in the county: Aliso Viejo, Buena Park, Cypress, Dana Point, Garden Grove, Irvine, La Palma, Laguna Hills, Laguna Niguel, Laguna Woods, Los Alamitos, Mission Viejo, Rancho Santa Margarita, Santa Ana, San Clemente, San Juan Capistrano, Seal Beach, Stanton, Tustin, Villa Park, Westminster and Yorba Linda. There are 7 divisions and 11 battalions.

== History ==
Prior to 1980, the Orange County Fire Department, as it was then known, was operated by CAL FIRE under contract. In May 1980, the Orange County Fire Department was formed to serve the county. Over the next decade, multiple new cities were formed from what had been unincorporated areas of the county. Many of these cities chose to contract with the OCFD for fire services. In 1991 the OCFD began exploring the possibility of reorganizing as a separate agency, first as a Special District and then as a Joint Powers Authority. The County filed for bankruptcy in December 1994, which further encouraged Orange County Fire Department to reorganize as a JPA, known as the Orange County Fire Authority. In 2012 the Orange County Fire Authority absorbed the Santa Ana Fire Department. In, January 2017, OCFA Station 61 in the city of Buena Park Caught fire. Station 61 is just adjacent to the rear of Knotts Berry Farm. The incident occurred around 3 A.M. Engine 61 was en route to a medical emergency at the time but was quickly cancelled when Engine 61 returned. The station was engulfed in flames. No one was injured in the event and all were able to safely escape. A $1,000,000 ladder truck was lost in the blaze, which was the 2006 American Lafrance Truck 61. In 2018, Station 61 was reconstructed on 7440 La Palma Ave, nearly a block away from the old location. In 2019 the OCFA absorbed the Garden Grove Fire Department. Later that year, the City of Placentia, California decided that it would leave the OCFA and create its own fire department, Placentia Fire and Life Safety Department. Placentia, California is the first city to leave the authority.

== Stations & equipment ==
The Operations Department of the OCFA is responsible for directly rendering emergency services to the communities that OCFA serves. In 2006, OCFA responded to 79,718 incidents within its jurisdiction and 4,084 mutual aid calls. The department is split into seven geographic divisions numbered 1-7 with 11 battalions, each commanded by a battalion chief. In 2017-2019, OCFA Purchased a large amount of KME Pumpers and 11 KME TDA's, which went to Trucks 4, 17, 22, 28, 43, 45, 56, 61, 71, 75, and 76. In 2020, they also purchased 4 KME 100' RM Ladders, which will go to Trucks 59, 49, 81, and 85, 2 Water Tenders (WT 4 and 16), and 3 Type III Brush Engines, which went to E351, E358, and E364. In 2021, they again, purchased 13 more KME Pumpers, which were assigned to Engines 9, 22, 222, 24, 29, 30, 31, 38, 60, 64, 66, 67, and 78. And in 2023, 3 Sutphen Monarch 100’ MM aerials were purchased and assigned to Trucks 20, 24, and 32. And most recently, a Rosenbauer Heavy Rescue was purchased to replace HR6, a Pierce Arrow XT.

=== Division 1 ===
Division 1 is located in the western area of Orange County. It covers the communities of Los Alamitos, Seal Beach, Westminster, Midway City, and Garden Grove; and the unincorporated communities of Rossmoor, and Sunset Beach. Division 1 is covered by Battalion 1 commanding seven fire stations with Station 2 in Los Alamitos, Stations 44 and 48 in Seal Beach and Stations 64, 65 and 66 in Westminster. and Battalion 11 also commanding seven stations covering the city of Garden Grove. The stations in Battalion 11 are Stations 80, 81, 82, 83, 84, 85 and 86 in Garden Grove. As of July 1, 2025, Station 25 was disbanded. Engine Company 25 was transitioned, re-entering Truck Company 64 into service. This is the first time Truck 64 is seen in service since 2019. On May 21, 2026, the Garden Grove Chemical Leak occurred at a GKN Aerospace manufacturing facility in Garden Grove. It lasted 5 days with hazmat units all over the county responding including OCFAs Hazmat Utility 20, Hazmat 20, 220, and 79 staying day, and night on the call. With fear of the 7,000 gallon tank of methyl methacrylate exploding, a nine-square-mile area (23 km^{2}) of Garden Grove had a mandatory evacuation affecting nearly 50,000 people.

Battalion 1
Fire Station Number	City	Engine Company	Truck Company	EMS Units	Wildland Units	Auxiliary Units
2	Los Alamitos	Paramedic Engine 2, Reserve Engine 102				
44	Seal Beach	Paramedic Engine 44				
48	Seal Beach	Paramedic Engine 48		Patrol 48		
64	Westminster	Paramedic Engine 64	Paramedic Truck 64	Emergency Transport 64, Emergency Transport 264	Engine 364	Battalion Chief 1, Division 1, Cadet Engine 1
65	Westminster	Paramedic Engine 65				
66	Westminster	Paramedic Engine 66		Emergency Transport 66		

Battalion 11
Fire Station Number	City	Engine Company	Truck Company	Wildland Units	Auxiliary Units
80	Garden Grove	Paramedic Engine 80			
81	Garden Grove		Paramedic Truck 81		Battalion Chief 11
82	Garden Grove	Paramedic Engine 82			
83	Garden Grove	Paramedic Engine 83			
84	Garden Grove	Paramedic Engine 84		Engine 384	
85	Garden Grove		Paramedic Truck 85		
86	Garden Grove	Paramedic Engine 86, Reserve Engine 186			

=== Division 2 ===
Division 2 is located in the central area of Orange County covering the city of Irvine; along with the John Wayne Airport, and University of California, Irvine. Division 2 covered by Battalion 5 and Battalion 10, each commanding six fire stations. The stations in Battalion 5 are Stations 4, 6, 28, 33, 36 and 47. The stations in Battalion 10 are Stations 20, 26, 27, 38, 51 and 55.

Battalion 5
Fire Station Number	City	Engine Company	Truck Company	EMS Units	Wildland Units	Auxiliary Units
4	Irvine	Paramedic Engine 4	Paramedic Truck 4	Reserve Medic 104, Reserve Medic 904 (Ex-Medic 4)	Water Tender 4	
6	Irvine	Paramedic Engine 6	Heavy Rescue 6			Battalion 5, Swift Water 6, USAR 6
28	Irvine	Paramedic Engine 28	Paramedic Truck 28	Reserve Medic 128		
33	John Wayne Airport					Crash 1, Crash 2, Crash 3, Crane 33, Foam Trailer 33, Utility 33, Stair 33
36	Irvine	Paramedic Engine 36				Foam 36, Investigator 36, Cadet Engine 5
47	Irvine	Paramedic Engine 47			Engine 347, Dozer 1	

Battalion 10
Fire Station Number	City	Engine Company	Truck Company	EMS Units	Wildland Units	Auxiliary Units
20	Irvine	Paramedic Engine 20	Truck 20	EMS Cart 3		Battalion Chief 10, HazMat 20, HazMat 220, HazMat Utility 20
26	Irvine	Paramedic Engine 26			Patrol 26	
27	Irvine	Paramedic Engine 27			Engine 327	Information 1 & 2 (PIO)
38	Irvine	Paramedic Engine 38		Reserve Medic 138 (Special Events)		
51	Irvine	Paramedic Engine 51			Engine 351	Division 2, Mass Casualty 51
55	Irvine	Paramedic Engine 55			Engine 355	Investigator 55

=== Division 3 ===
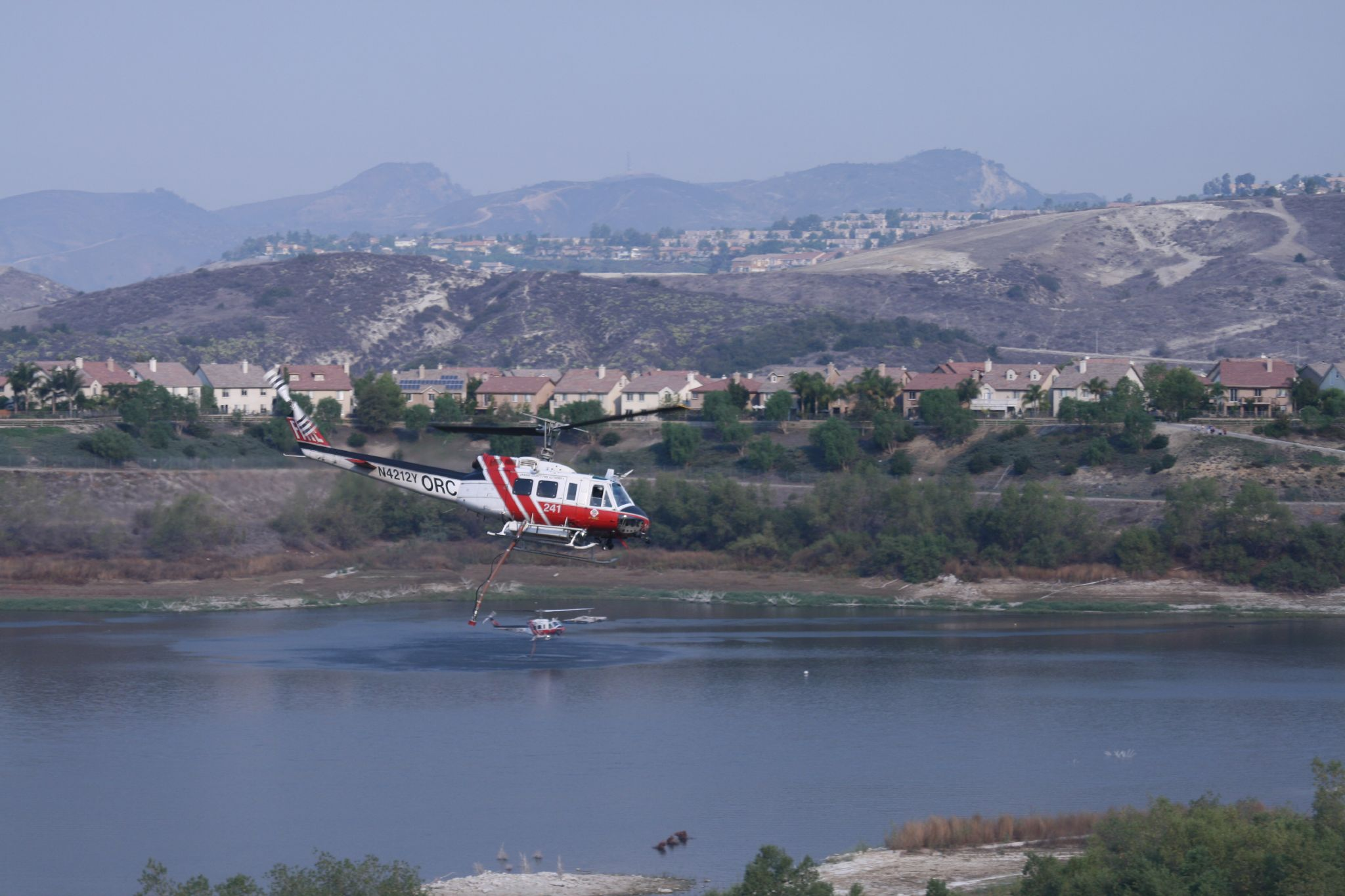
OCFA helicopters filling their water tanks at Upper Oso Reservoir during the Santiago Fire (2007)

Division 3 is located in the southern and eastern areas of Orange County. It covers the cities of Dana Point, Laguna Hills, Laguna Niguel, Mission Viejo, Rancho Santa Margarita, San Clemente, and San Juan Capistrano; along with the unincorporated communities of Coto de Caza, Ladera Ranch, Las Flores, Modjeska Canyon, and Trabuco Canyon. Division 3 is covered by Battalion 6 and Battalion 7, both commanding seven fire stations. Battalion 6 commands Stations 7, 29, 30, 50, 56, 59, 60 and 67, while Battalion 7 commands Stations 9, 18, 24, 31, 40, 45 and 58. As of June 25, 2025, Paramedic Truck 9 was transitioned to Paramedic Truck 24, as the new station 24 has completed construction, as well as seeing the disbandment of Medic 45 on July 1, 2025.

Battalion 6
Fire Station Number	City	Engine Company	Truck Company	EMS Units	Wildland Units	Auxiliary Units
7	San Juan Capistrano	Paramedic Engine 7		Medic 7	Engine 307, Patrol 7, Water Tender 7	
29	Dana Point	Paramedic Engine 29				Battalion Chief 6
30	Dana Point	Paramedic Engine 30			Patrol 30	
50	San Clemente	Paramedic Engine 50		Care Ambulance 50	Engine 350	
56	Rancho Mission Viejo	Paramedic Engine 56	USAR Truck 56			Urban Support 56, Swift Water 56
59	San Clemente		Paramedic Truck 59			Cadet Engine 6, Utility 59
60	San Clemente	Paramedic Engine 60				
67	Rancho Mission Viejo	Paramedic Engine 67			Engine 367	

Battalion 7
Fire Station Number	City	Engine Company	Truck Company	EMS Units	Wildland Units	Auxiliary Units
9	Mission Viejo	Paramedic Engine 9				
18	Trabuco Canyon	Paramedic Engine 18			Fire Crew 1, Fire Crew 2, Fire Crew 18, Engine 318, Patrol 18	Superintendent 1
24	Mission Viejo	Paramedic Engine 24	Paramedic Truck 24			
31	Mission Viejo	Paramedic Engine 31				
40	Coto de Caza	Paramedic Engine 40				
45	Rancho Santa Margarita	Paramedic Engine 45	Paramedic Truck 45		Engine 345	Battalion Chief 7, Utility 45, Utility 7, Reserve Battalion Chief 945, Service Support 3, Cadet Engine 7
58	Ladera Ranch	Paramedic Engine 58			Engine 358	Division 3

=== Division 4 ===
Division 4 is located in the northern area of Orange County. It covers cities of Tustin, Villa Park, and Yorba Linda along with the unincorporated communities of El Modena, Orange Park Acres, Santiago Canyon, Silverado Canyon, and North Tustin. Division 4 is covered by Battalion 3 commanding eight fire stations and Battalion 2 commanding three fire stations. The stations in Battalion 3 are Stations 8, 14, 15, 16, 21, 37 and 43. The stations in Battalion 2 are Stations 10, 23, 32 and 53. In July 2020, the city of Placentia disbanded from OCFA, disbanding stations 34 and 35. Truck 34 was the only station unit to be reassigned, now as Truck 32. Water Tender 32 has since been reassigned back to Water Tender 10, where it was originally assigned before being assigned to Water Tender 32 around 2009 (exact date not available). Battalion 2 was since reassigned from Station 34 to Station 53, then in 2021, moved to station 10.

Battalion 3
Fire Station Number	City	Engine Company	Truck Company	EMS Units	Wildland Units	Auxiliary Units
8	Santa Ana	Paramedic Engine 8				
14	Silverado	Engine 14			Patrol 14	
15	Silverado	Paramedic Engine 15			Engine 315, Patrol 15	
16	Modjeska Canyon	Engine 16			Patrol 16, Water Tender 16	
21	Tustin	Paramedic Engine 21				Battalion Chief 3, Cadet Engine 3
37	Tustin	Paramedic Engine 37				Division 4
43	Tustin		Paramedic Truck 43	Reserve Medic 943		Utility 3

Battalion 2
Fire Station Number	City	Engine Company	Truck Company	EMS Units	Wildland Units	Auxiliary Units
10	Yorba Linda	Paramedic Engine 10			Water Tender 10, Patrol 10	Battalion 2, Utility 2
23	Orange	Paramedic Engine 23			Patrol 23	
32	Yorba Linda	Paramedic Engine 32	USAR Truck 32	Reserve Medic 932		USAR Support 32
53	Yorba Linda	Paramedic Engine 53			Engine 353, Dozer 2	Cadet Engine 2

=== Division 5 ===
Division 5 covers the cities of Aliso Viejo, Laguna Hills, Laguna Niguel, Laguna Woods, Lake Forest, Emerald Bay and Mission Viejo. Division 5 is covered by Battalion 4 commanding nine fire stations. These stations are Stations 5, 11, 19, 22, 39, 42, 49, 54 and 57. There are two paramedic engine companies at Station 22. As of July 1, 2025, Paramedic Engine Company 12 was placed into service, running temporarily out of station 19 while station 12 is being constructed, as well as the disbandment of Medic 57.

Battalion 4
Fire Station Number	City	Engine Company	Truck Company	EMS units	Wildland Units	Auxiliary Units
5	Laguna Niguel	Paramedic Engine 5, Reserve Engine 105				
11	Emerald Bay	Engine 11			Patrol 11	
19	Lake Forest	Paramedic Engine 19, Paramedic Engine 12				
22	Laguna Woods	Paramedic Engine 22, Paramedic Engine 222	Truck 22			Battalion Chief 4, Reserve Battalion Chief 904, Utility 22
39	Laguna Niguel	Paramedic Engine 39			Engine 339	Utility 39
42	Lake Forest	Paramedic Engine 42				
49	Laguna Niguel		Paramedic Truck 49			
54	Lake Forest	Paramedic Engine 54				USAR Task Force 5
57	Aliso Viejo	Paramedic Engine 57, Reserve Engine 157			Patrol 57	Division 5, Cadet Engine 4

=== Division 6 ===
Division 6 is located in the center area of Orange County, covers the city of Santa Ana and is covered by Battalion 9 commanding ten fire stations. These stations are Stations 70, 71, 72, 73, 74, 75, 76, 77, 78 and 79.

Battalion 9
Fire Station Number	City	Engine Company	Truck Company	EMS Units	Wildland Units	Auxiliary Units
70	Santa Ana	Paramedic Engine 70			Engine 370	Service Support 2
71	Santa Ana	Paramedic Engine 71	Paramedic Truck 71	Reserve Medic 171		
72	Santa Ana	Paramedic Engine 72				
73	Santa Ana	Paramedic Engine 73				
74	Santa Ana	Paramedic Engine 74				Battalion Chief 9, Division 6
75	Santa Ana	Paramedic Engine 75	Paramedic Truck 75			Cadet Engine 9
76	Santa Ana		Paramedic Truck 76, Reserve Truck 976			
77	Santa Ana	Paramedic Engine 77				
78	Santa Ana	Paramedic Engine 78				
79	Santa Ana	Paramedic Engine 79				HazMat 79

=== Division 7 ===
Division 7 is located in the western area of Orange County. It covers the communities of Buena Park, Cypress, La Palma, Stanton and the Air Support Facility at Fullerton Airport. In 2024 OCFA received two Sikorsky S70I Firehawks, as Helicopters 1 & 2. The Firehawks replaced two Bell UH-1 Super Hueys, after they were grounded in 2020 due to rising maintenance costs. The 2 existing Bell 412EP’s were reassigned to Helicopters 3 & 4. Battalion 8 commands Stations 13, 17, 41, 46, 61, 62 and 63.

Battalion 8
Fire Station Number	City	Engine Company	Truck Company	EMS Units	Auxiliary Units
13	La Palma	Paramedic Engine 13		Reserve Medic 113	
17	Cypress	Paramedic Engine 17, Reserve Engine 117, Reserve Engine 917	Truck 17		
41	Fullerton				Helicopter 1, 2, 3, 4 Helitender 41, 241 Water Tender 41
46	Stanton	Paramedic Engine 46		Medic 46	
61	Buena Park	Paramedic Engine 61	USAR Truck 61	EMS Cart 2 (Temporary)	USAR Support 61, Swift Water 61, Battalion Chief 8, Division 7, Cadet Engine 8
62	Buena Park	Paramedic Engine 62			
63	Buena Park	Paramedic Engine 63, Reserve Engine 163			

== See also ==
- Orange County, California
- CAL FIRE
- Chip Prather
