= Tucker Wildlife Sanctuary =

Nature reserve in Orange County, California

Tucker Wildlife Sanctuary is a non-profit nature reserve owned and operated by the Environmental Nature Center (ENC). It is located at the Santa Ana Mountains in Orange County, California, in the United States near the end of Modjeska Canyon, at the foot of Modjeska Peak, and adjacent to the Cleveland National Forest. Tucker is open to the public Saturday and Sunday from 10am-3pm to enjoy and learn about the local wildlife and natural habitat in the Southern California canyon area. Tucker's facilities include a small natural history museum and interpretive center, a bird observation porch, relaxing patio and picnic areas, a small amphitheatre, hiking trails, a gift shop, restrooms and a visitor parking lot.
