= Carbondale, Amador County, California =

Unincorporated community in California, United States

Carbondale
- Former settlement
- Location in California Carbondale (the United States)
- Coordinates: 38°24′32″N 121°00′25″W
- Country: United States
- State: California
- County: Amador County
- Elevation: 223 ft (68 m)

Carbondale (formerly, Buckeye) is a former settlement in Amador County, California. It was located 6 miles (10 km) northwest of Ione on the Southern Pacific Railroad, at an elevation of 223 feet (68 m).

The place's early economy was related to coal mining and shipment. Large deposits of potter's clay were also mined in the area, along with aluminum and sand at one time. A post office operated at Carbondale from 1922 to 1955.

Nothing remains of Carbondale today.

== See also ==
- Carbondale, Orange County, California - Another town in California named Carbondale supported by coal mining
