= Carbondale, Orange County, California =

California historic landmark

Carbondale, California
- Location within California
- 33°44′41″N 117°39′22″W
- Location: Silverado, California

History
- Built: 1878

Site notes
- Architect: Southern Pacific

California Historical Landmark
- Designated: June 20, 1935
- Reference no.: 228

Carbondale, in Orange County, California, United States, is a historical coal mining town in Santiago Canyon, where Santiago Creek had its confluence with Silverado Creek in Silverado, California. It had a post office from May 11, 1881, to January 29, 1884, when it was closed and mail sent to the Santa Ana post office.

Coal was discovered near Santiago Creek in 1878. A coal mine was established there, called the Santa Clara. In 1881, the Southern Pacific took over the Santa Clara Coal Mine, and a mining camp, Carbondale, with a post office was established on the flat near the creek. Besides the post office, it had a hotel, saloons, a store, and shacks for the miners. Carbondale became the post office for Silverado after its post office was closed on January 22, 1883. When the coal was depleted, the coal mine was closed down in 1884. Carbondale's post office closed, and its buildings and equipment were removed, leaving few other remains.

== See also ==
- California Historical Landmarks in Orange County, California

== Marker ==
The site is marked as California State Historical Landmark No. 228 by a plaque located at the Silverado Community Church entrance on Silverado Canyon Rd., 1.1 mi west of the Silverado post office. It is also marked as Orange County Historical Site No. 1 by a plaque located at 8002 Silverado Canyon Rd., Silverado.

The marker at the site reads:

- In 1881, after the Southern Pacific took over the Santa Clara Coal Mine northeast of here, a bustling mining camp complete with hotel, saloons, shacks, store, and post office sprang up on these flats. Three years later the mine played out and Carbondale disappeared without a trace. Erected 1976 by Orange County Board of Supervisors and Orange County Historical Commission. (Marker Number 01, CA 228.)
