= Garden Grove chemical leak =

2026 industrial accident in California

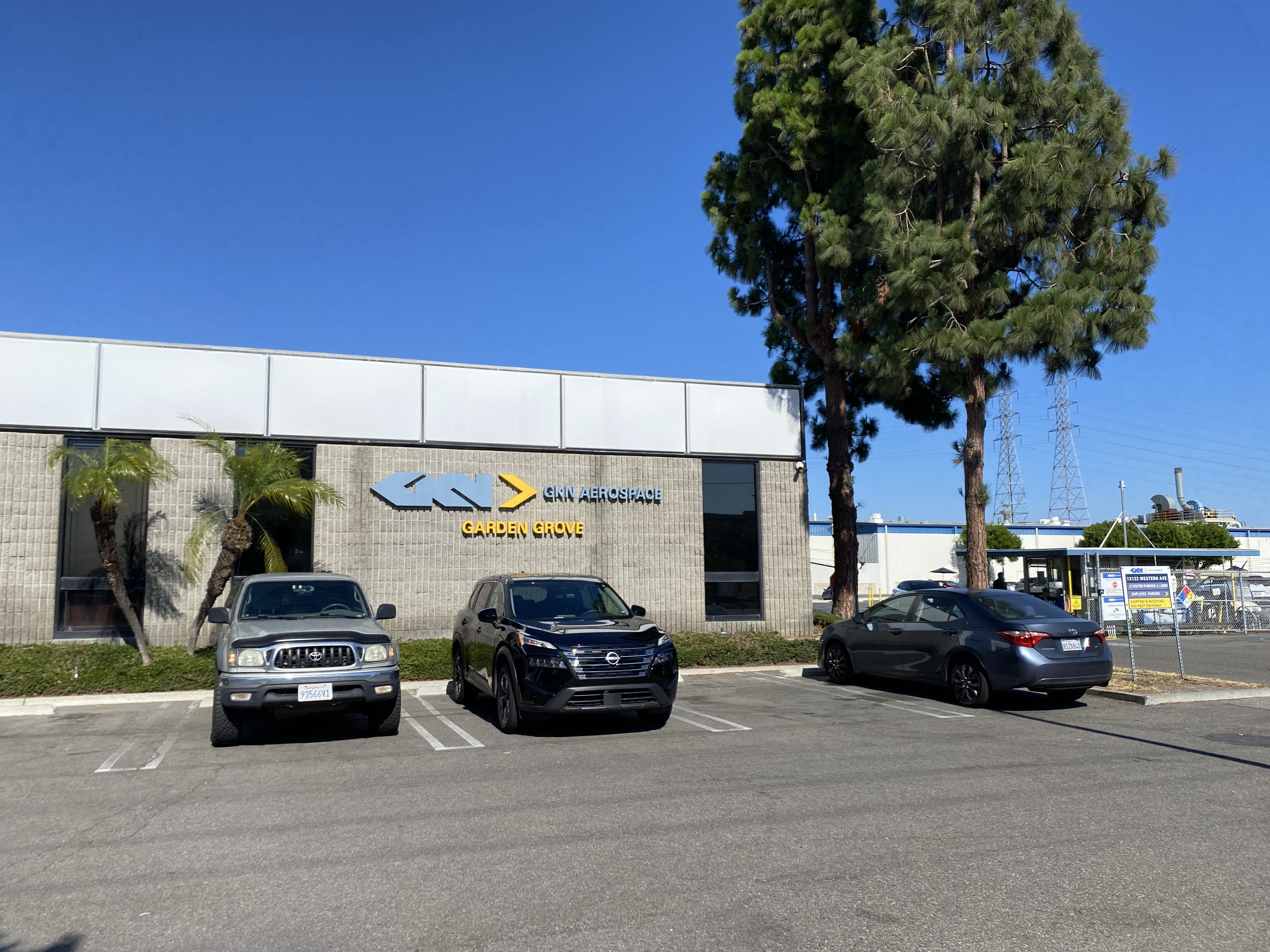
- GKN Aerospace facility in Garden Grove, California, in June 2026.
- Incident site and evacuation zones from May 22 and May 25
- Date: May 21–26, 2026
- Time: 3:30 p.m. (PDT)
- Duration: 5 days
- Location: Garden Grove, California, US; 33°47′1.0″N 117°59′59.3″W
- Type: Chemical accident
- Website: ggcity.org/hazmat-incident

On May 21, 2026, a chemical leak occurred at a GKN Aerospace manufacturing facility in Garden Grove in Orange County, California, about 35 miles (56 km) southeast of Los Angeles. First responders with the Orange County Fire Authority (OCFA) determined that a chemical tank had begun to overheat and off-gas excess pressure. The tank contained approximately 7,000 US gallons (26 kL) of methyl methacrylate (MMA), a flammable and volatile liquid chemical used in plastics manufacturing. Unable to chemically neutralize or drain its contents due to a faulty valve, authorities stated that the tank would either fail and spill liquid MMA into the surrounding area or experience a boiling liquid expanding vapor explosion (BLEVE), releasing toxic vapor over a wide area.

Due to the possibility of an explosion, mandatory evacuation orders were issued, affecting over 50,000 people in a nine-square-mile area (23 km^{2}) which included parts of Garden Grove as well as the bordering Orange County cities of Anaheim, Buena Park, Cypress, Stanton, and Westminster. California governor Gavin Newsom declared a state of emergency in Orange County, and a Federal Emergency Declaration was signed by President Donald Trump.

On May 25, authorities discovered that a crack in the tank wall had relieved the excess pressure, and the evacuation orders were fully lifted the following day. An investigation conducted by the Orange County District Attorney's office concluded with no criminal charges. GKN Aerospace pledged $5 million in community donations, including $1 million to the American Red Cross, and announced a $100 million damages claims program for affected residents and businesses.

== Background ==
=== GKN Aerospace ===
GKN Aerospace is a company based in the United Kingdom that manufactures commercial and military aircraft components. The company's 15.5-acre facility (6.3 ha) in Garden Grove, California, has operated since 2004 and is involved in the production of military canopies, cockpit windows, and passenger windows. At the time of the chemical leak, the facility employed at least 540 people, according to a 2024 news release, and an expansion for a new production line was scheduled to be completed in January 2027. Garden Grove city officials issued a permit for a 34,000-square-foot (3,200 m^{2}) expansion of the facility on May 19, 2026, days before the incident. On its website, GKN Aerospace cited increasing demand for the F-35 fighter jet as the reason for expansion.

As early as 2018, GKN Aerospace faced penalties from the California Department of Industrial Relations after an inspection of the Garden Grove facility revealed the company did not maintain or inspect all active machinery on the site and improperly cooled and covered tanks. That same year, ten violations were found during Occupational Safety and Health Administration (OSHA) visits to the facility. In 2019, GKN Aerospace was fined $2,898 for unpaid civil penalties related to their failed safety inspections and poor maintenance. In 2021, GKN Aerospace paid $909,935 in a settlement with the South Coast Air Quality Management District for several environmental violations, including failing to keep emission records regarding volatile chemical compounds, operating equipment without a permit, and using toxic chemicals in plant operations. In 2022, OSHA fined GKN Aerospace an additional $420 over a safety issue at this facility. In March 2025, the company received notices to comply regarding operating records, registration of equipment, and an application for change in ownership of the facility.

=== Methyl methacrylate ===
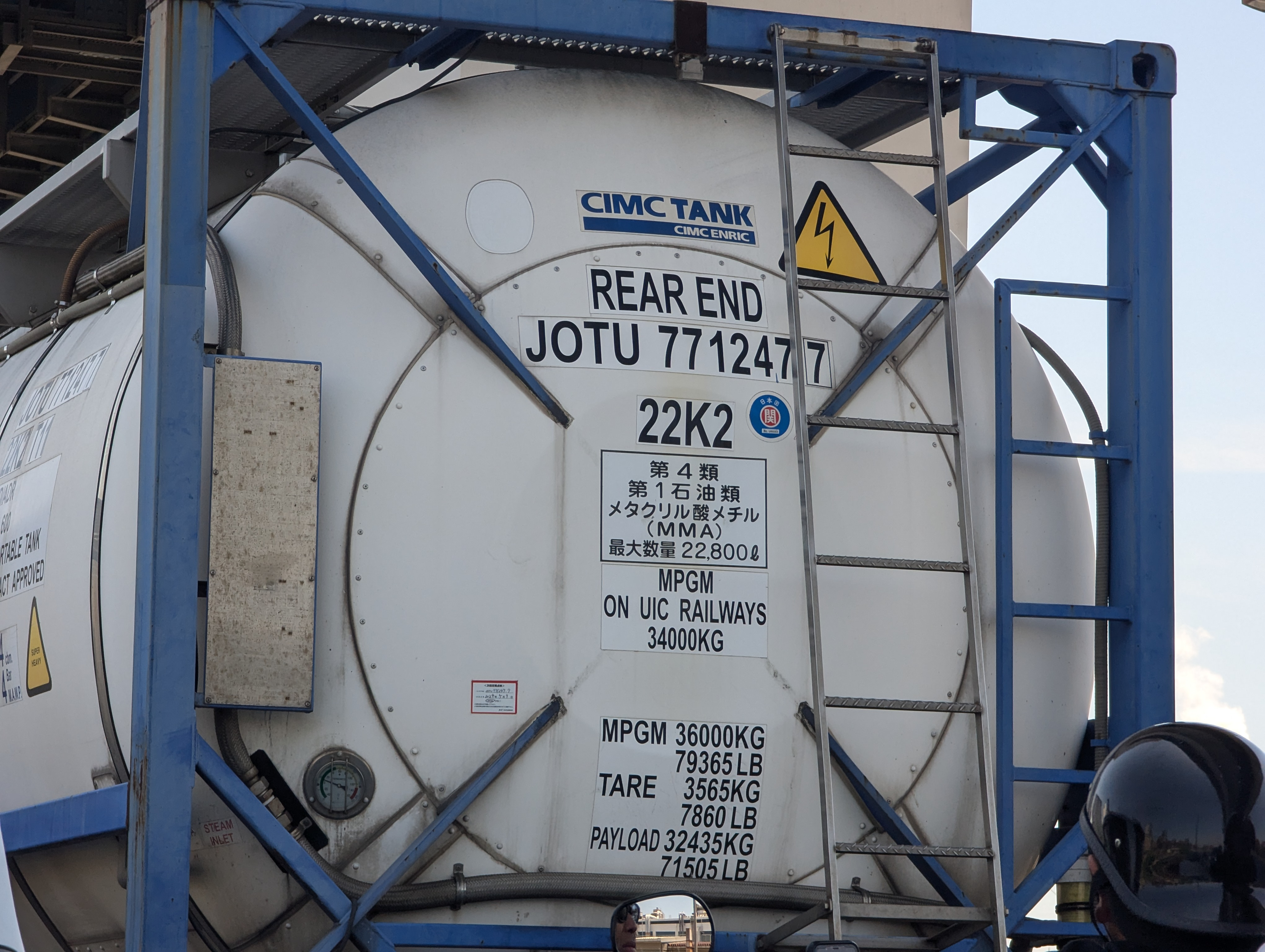
A container of methyl methacrylate on a truck

Methyl methacrylate (MMA) is a chemical used in the manufacturing of plastics and resins. It is flammable and volatile, and short-term exposure can irritate the eyes, skin and lungs. MMA is a monomer that undergoes a polymerization reaction, which is exothermic, and the rate of polymerization increases as temperature increases; therefore, an uncontrolled self-polymerization can lead to thermal runaway. The increased temperature increases pressure, so a tank containing MMA that is actively polymerizing is an explosion risk.

MMA is a key ingredient in acrylic F-35 fighter jet canopies, for which the GKN Aerospace Garden Grove facility is a lead manufacturer. Two of the three chemical tanks at the facility were confirmed to contain MMA, including the damaged tank.

== Incident ==
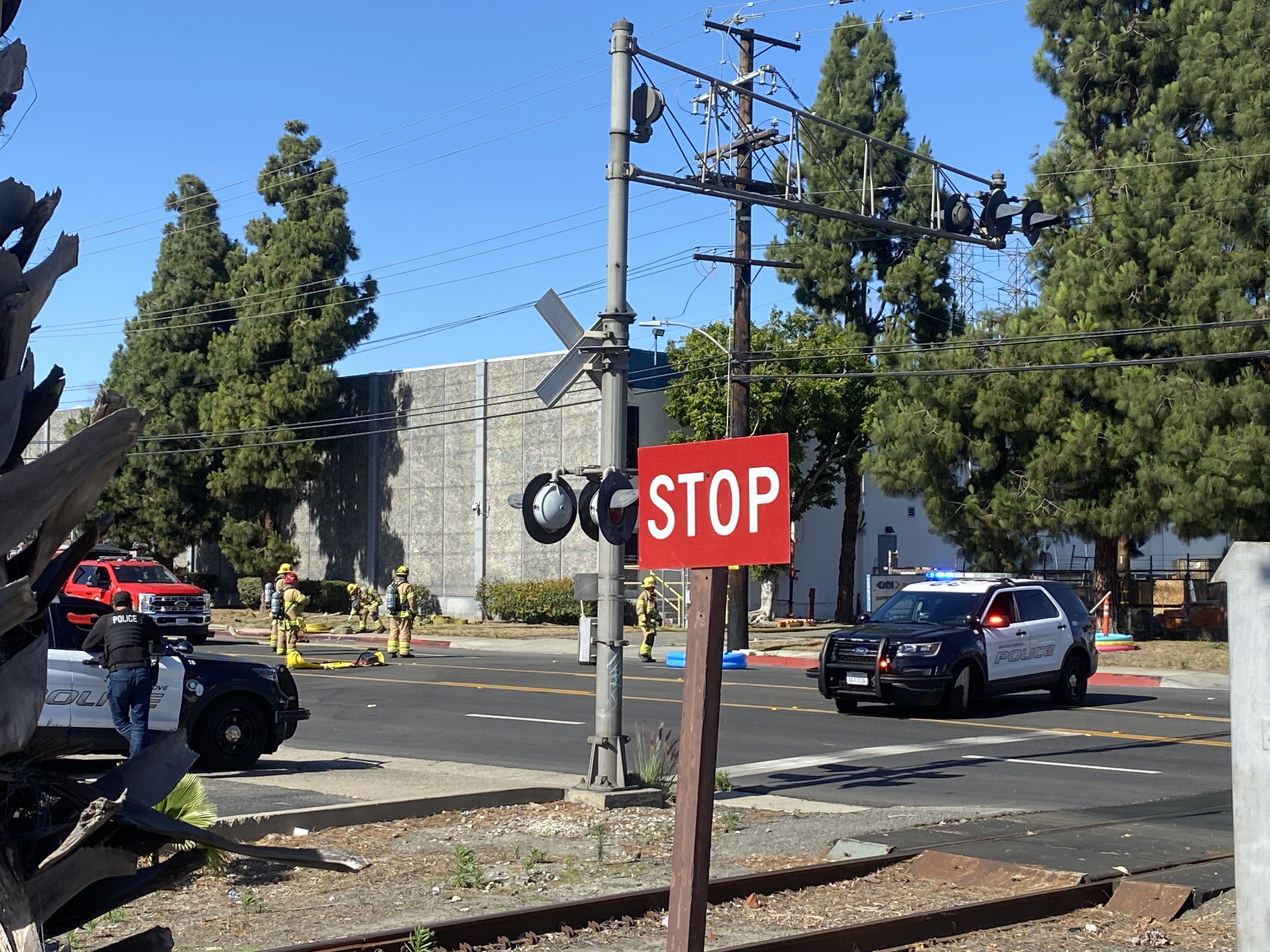
Firefighters and police near the incident on May 27, 2026

At approximately 3:22 p.m. PDT on May 21, 2026, the Orange County Fire Authority (OCFA) was alerted to a hazardous materials incident at the GKN Aerospace facility in Garden Grove. Upon arriving at the scene, the OCFA determined that a 34,000-US-gallon (130 kL) tank containing approximately 7,000 US gal (26 kL) of methyl methacrylate (MMA) had begun to off-gas vapor and bulge outwards. The off-gassing tank was one of three tanks at the GKN site, with a neighboring tank confirmed to also contain MMA. A problem with a valve in the tank's refrigeration system, which normally maintained the internal temperature at 50 °F (10 °C), caused the tank's contents to overheat and pressurize; the tank's pressure relief valve and sprinkler system activated automatically.

Authorities issued an evacuation order to local residents. As the temperature inside the tank continued to rise, firefighters cooled the overheating tank by spraying water with unmanned water hoses, allowing the relief valve to close and preventing further vapor release of the contents. The evacuation orders were lifted that night. GKN Aerospace's response team attempted to inject a chemically neutralizing agent into the tank to reduce the volatility of its contents. However, the tank's valves were "gummed up" due to the chemical reaction taking place inside, preventing the injection of the substance and leaving no clear options to prevent the tank's failure. Were the tank to explode, the toxic chemical would have been released as a vapor, distributing it over a wide area and posing a health risk to residents. Evacuation orders were reinstated and expanded the next day.

On the night of May 22, a team approached one of the two neighboring tanks in an attempt to chemically neutralize its contents and was able to read the internal temperature gauge on the overheating tank. The reading was 90 °F (32 °C), significantly higher than the 77 °F (25 °C) reading that had been taken that morning before responders retreated. Firefighters had previously believed the temperature to be decreasing based on exterior temperature readings via drone. According to OCFA incident commander chief Craig Covey, the new assessment indicated an average increase of 1 °F (0.56 °C) per hour on the afternoon of May 23. By May 24, the internal temperature had reached at least 100 °F (38 °C), the maximum temperature reading possible by the gauge.

The OCFA said teams were thinking "outside the box" and communicating with experts around the country to find ways to mitigate the crisis. In a press conference, Covey stated that, with the MMA unable to be neutralized or drained, the two outcomes possible were that the tank would fail and spill liquid MMA into the surrounding area, or that the contents would enter thermal runaway and experience a boiling liquid expanding vapor explosion (BLEVE). Responders constructed channels and holding areas to prevent liquid MMA flowing into storm drains, waterways or the ocean if the tank were to rupture.

Firefighters and hazardous materials experts conducted an overnight mission on May 23 to assess the integrity of the tank. The crew discovered a crack in the tank, through which no liquid was leaking, but were forced to retreat when alarm sounded. According to OCFA interim fire chief TJ McGovern, the crack was possibly relieving pressure inside the tank, potentially preventing the tank from exploding.

A second all-night operation was conducted the next day to determine whether the excess tank pressure had been relieved. The other neighboring tank containing MMA was successfully neutralized, and the third tank was assessed as structurally sound. Crews confirmed that the cracked tank's excess pressure was relieved, and they removed external insulation material to assist cooling efforts and allow for more accurate temperature readings. The internal temperature was recorded as a decrease to 93 °F (34 °C). On May 25, the OCFA confirmed that the threat of a BLEVE had been "eliminated", and authorities reduced the size of the evacuation zone while monitoring the possibility of a smaller explosion or leak. The following day, the OCFA stated that the risk of a chemical leak, explosion, and fire had been eliminated, and the evacuation order was fully lifted. No significant chemical spillage was reported. According to Garden Grove county officials, the OCFA incurred $2.8 million in expenses during the operation.

== Responses ==
=== Evacuation ===
The expanded mandatory evacuation orders issued on May 22 applied to roughly 50,000 people in a nine-square-mile area (23 km^{2}) around the Garden Grove facility, including parts of the neighboring Orange County cities of Anaheim, Buena Park, Cypress, Stanton and Westminster. About 15% of residents refused to leave the evacuation zone, according to Garden Grove police chief Amir El-Farra. As Garden Grove includes part of the neighborhood of Little Saigon, local Vietnamese radio and television stations translated emergency updates for non-English-speaking residents.

Local authorities established evacuation centers at several community centers, schools, and parks, including Savanna High School, Mile Square Regional Park, Los Amigos High School, Ocean View High School, Golden West College, John F. Kennedy High School, and Los Alamitos High School. State-owned properties and fairgrounds in Orange County became available as evacuation centers, and evacuees with recreational vehicles were permitted to park at the OC Fair & Event Center in Costa Mesa. Several of these emergency shelters were managed by the American Red Cross. Airbnb.org, a non-profit company founded by Airbnb, partnered with 211 Orange to offer free emergency housing.

Several businesses provided free or discounted services for affected residents. Planet Fitness, 24 Hour Fitness, and LA Fitness locations in Orange County and portions of Southern Los Angeles County opened to evacuees regardless of membership, and Uber offered free transportation to evacuation sites. Various hotels in the surrounding area offered discounts for affected residents. The Elks Lodge in Garden Grove also provided shelter. U-Haul offered displaced residents 30-days free use of its self-storage units and portable storage containers. World Central Kitchen volunteered alongside local restaurants and food trucks to provide meals to evacuees.

Orange County supervisor Janet Nguyen assisted in opening more shelters for evacuees. Staff from the Orange County Registrar of Voters assisted evacuees at shelters with voting for the 2026 California primary elections. Orange County Sheriff's Department officers were sent to patrol the evacuated areas to deter looters.

Several schools districts either closed campuses or relocated classes to alternate physical sites or online, including the Garden Grove Unified School District, Magnolia School District, Savanna School District, and the Westminster School District. CR&R Environmental Services trash collection operations, which serve several cities, were delayed as its facilities were located in the evacuation zone.

The evacuation zone was reduced on May 25 after the OCFA eliminated the possibility of a boiling liquid expanding vapor explosion, allowing roughly 34,000 residents to return home, and it was fully lifted on May 26.

=== California state government ===
The Office of the Governor began coordinating with local agencies on May 21. On May 23, California governor Gavin Newsom declared a state of emergency in Orange County. Newsom requested a Federal Emergency Declaration from President Donald Trump; California senators Alex Padilla and Adam Schiff and Representative Derek Tran of California's 45th congressional district, which includes Garden Grove, sent letters to the president urging him to approve the request. The declaration was signed by Trump on May 25. In a news release on May 24, Newsom's office said that 785 state and local first responders were deployed to Orange County.

The South Coast Air Quality Management District coordinated with the Environmental Protection Agency (EPA) to deploy 24 stationary air monitors to measure pollutant levels around the evacuation zone. As of May 25, levels remained "completely normal". The EPA also dispatched two coordinators to the facility.

== Investigation ==
California governor Gavin Newsom said on May 27 that California officials were reviewing GKN Aerospace's safety records and those of other chemical plants, especially in light of a chemical tank collapse at a Longview, Washington, paper mill that occurred on May 26.

The Orange County District Attorney's office began their investigation on May 22, with investigators surveying the site via drones and opening an anonymous tip line. District Attorney Todd Spitzer ordered GKN Aerospace to preserve relevant records in the event of future litigation, and "hold" letters were sent to the company's representatives. On August 24, the DA's office announced that its investigation had concluded with no criminal charges, and that it was negotiating towards a civil disposition with GKN Aerospace. The California Division of Occupational Safety and Health opened an separate investigation into the facility.

Agents with the Federal Bureau of Investigation and Environmental Protection Agency served a search warrant at the GKN Aerospace Garden Grove facility on June 10. According to the warrant, agents searched for records related to the "storage, use, or disposal" of methyl methacrylate (MMA), samples of MMA, and documents related to inspections and maintenance.

== Remediation and recovery ==
=== Cleanup ===
Cleanup operations were performed by GKN Aerospace's environmental response partner, Arcwood Environmental, and overseen by the Orange County Health Care Agency in coordination with the South Coast Air Quality Management District and GKN Aerospace. The agency planned to begin mitigation operations on June 4 or 5, which would involve transferring the neutralized MMA in two tanks to sealed trucks and disposed off site. The delivery of these sealed trucks was delayed, pushing back the planned start date of the first phase. Cleanup operations formally began on June 30. On July 16, GKN Aerospace stated that cleanup operations were complete. Officials additionally tested about 50 U.S. gallons (190 L) of water for MMA after it had spilled into a storm drain at the facility during transfer from an unrelated storm water tank. GKN Aerospace employees conducted safety checks during the third week of June as the facility planned to partially restart operations in unaffected sections.

Following the conclusion of the criminal investigation performed by the Orange County District Attorney's Office, the office stated that GKN Aerospace planned to resume manufacturing operations on September 28, 2026, "contingent upon full compliance with required safety standards, ongoing monitoring protocols, any regulatory obligations and a court-approved safety plan". Garden Grove city officials said that they do not expect the facility to store MMA "before at least the first quarter of [2027]".

=== Compensation ===
GKN Aerospace announced on June 3, 2026, that it pledged $1 million to the American Red Cross and $3 million to the OC Community Resilience Fund, launched by the non-profit organization United Way to help businesses and residents affected by evacuations. Applications for the fund, which was available as a one-time payment of up to $500 per household, were no longer being accepted as of June 16. United Way said that it received over 6,000 applications for financial assistance, leading to the closure. GKN Aerospace pledged an addition $1 million "to support broader community initiatives across Orange County".

The Garden Grove City Council, headed by Mayor Stephanie Klopfenstein, sent a formal letter to GKN Aerospace on June 4, criticizing the $3 million donation as insufficient and demanding that the company send a representative to a future council meeting. A meeting was scheduled on June 9, during which the senior vice president of GKN Aerospace, Steven Carlin, apologized to the community.

Orange County council officials sent a letter to GKN Aerospace on July 17, 2026, demanding $4,071,305 for expenses incurred during the incident. The letter included an itemized list of costs, including $2.7 million by the Orange County Sheriff's Department, more than $233,000 by the county executive office, $195,000 by the county's healthcare agency, and $500,000 of discretionary funds that supervisors allocated to assist affected residents. Expenses incurred by the Orange County Fire Authority were not included. Counselor Leon Page, who authored the letter, said that the county is legally entitled to seek full restitution under the Comprehensive Environmental Response, Compensation, and Liability Act and the Hazardous Substance Account Act. The letter called the incident "not an unforseeable accident", citing GKN's inspection penalties. In a unanimous vote by its board of supervisors, Orange County initiated litigation processes against GKN Aerospace on August 25.

Following the conclusion of its criminal investigation, the Orange County District Attorney's Office announced on August 24 that GKN Aerospace agreed to establish a $100 million damages claim program for Orange County residents and business affected by the incident. The funds will be used to reimburse expenses including hotel costs, meals, transportation, and loss of wages. The District Attorney's Office announced on October 12 that a settlement agreement had been reached and submitted to a judge for approval. In addition to the damages claim program, the agreement included $15 million in civil penalties and $8.47 million to reimburse emergency response spending, including the $500,000 in discretionary funds expended by Orange County. A $1.4 million, seven-year injunction monitoring program for the facility will be paid for by GKN Aerospace.

The California Governor's Office of Emergency Services (CalOES) approved a reimbursement claim submitted by the city of Garden Grove, under the California Disaster Assistance Act, to be used for municipal spending. CalOES denied similar requests from the cities of Stanton and Westminster on August 12.

=== Legal proceedings ===
On May 23, 2026, a class-action lawsuit was filed against GKN Aerospace by The X-Law Group P.C. and Presidio Law Firm LLP, on behalf of affected residents of the area, led by two residents of the evacuation zone. The suit is seeking damages for residents facing evacuation orders, property disruption, potential health risks, loss of use of their homes, related expenses, and diminished property values. As of May 28, 2026, 44 lawsuits against GKN Aerospace have been filed in the Orange County Superior Court and the US District Court in Orange County.

== See also ==
- O'Connor Plating Works disaster – 1947 deadly explosion at a Los Angeles industrial factory
- Bhopal disaster – 1984 highly toxic gas release in Bhopal, Indioa, with a similar chemical starting to overheat
