= Stanton, California =

City in California, United States

- City
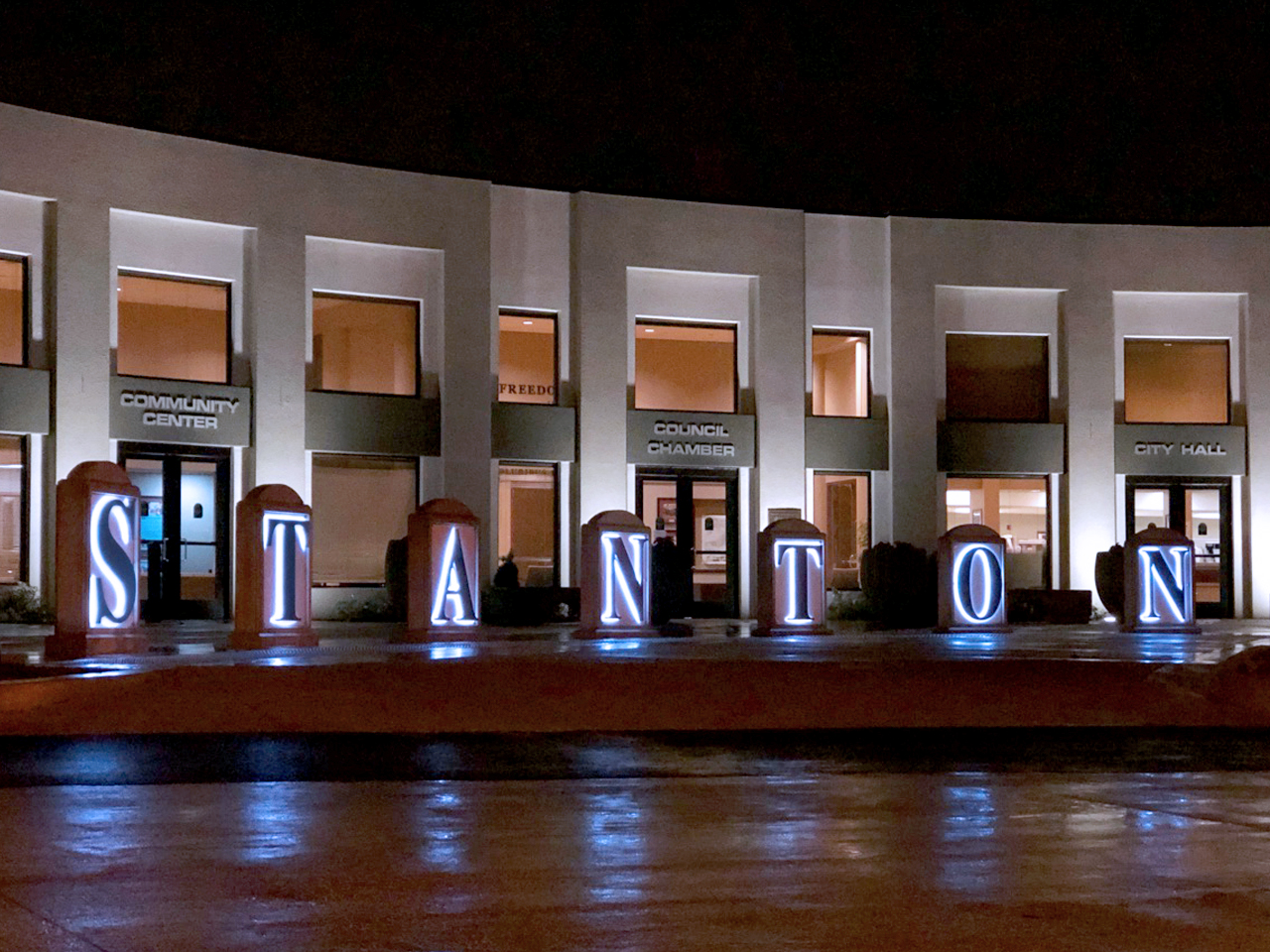
- Stanton City Hall

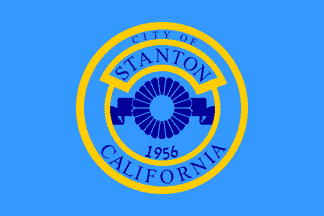
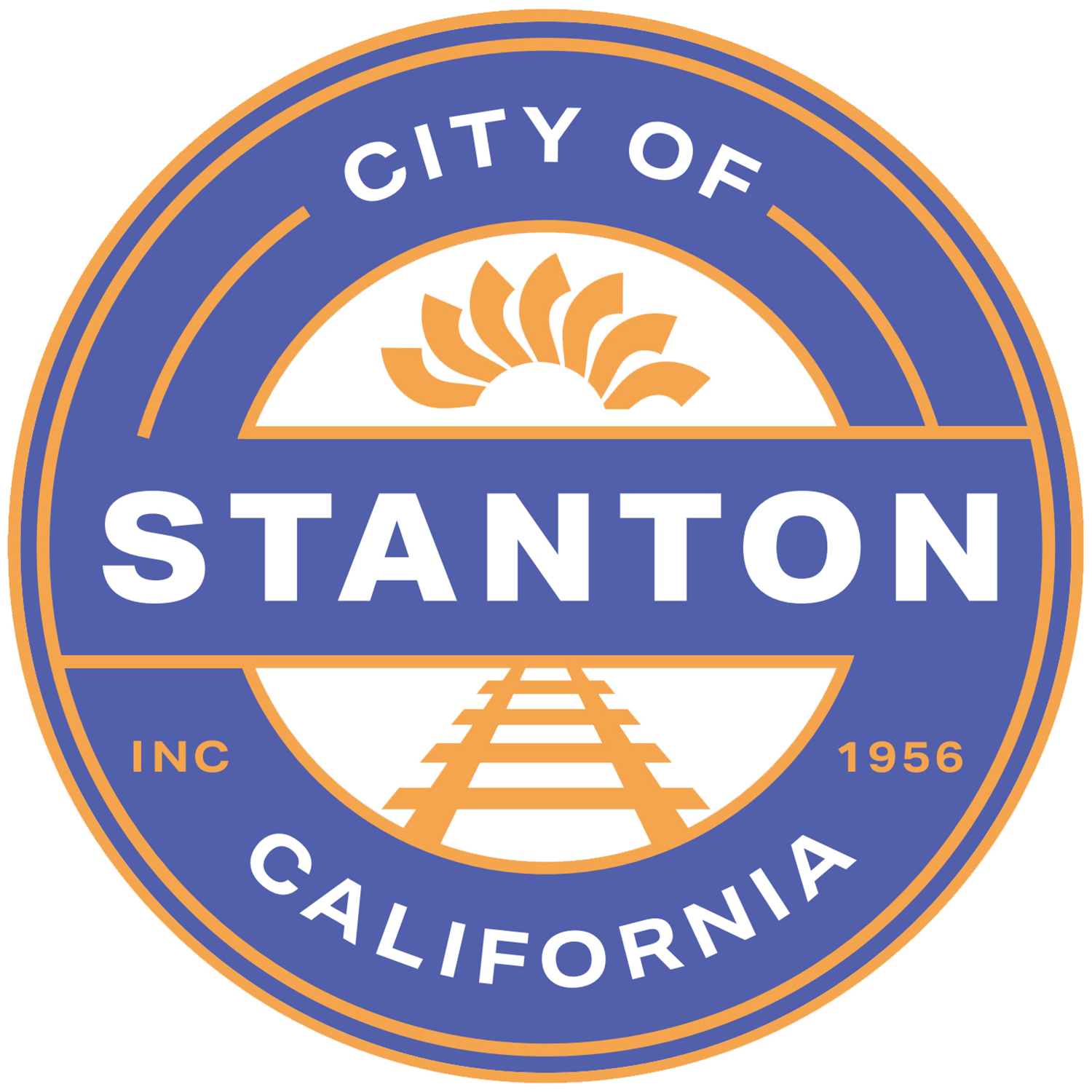
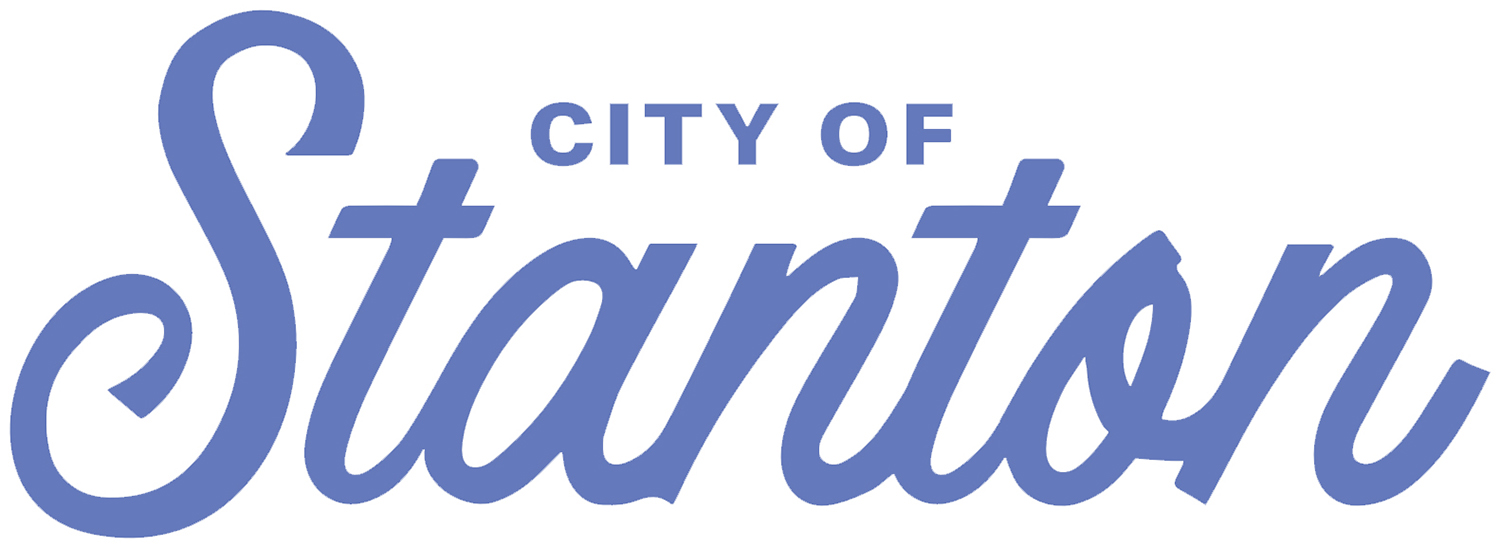
- Flag Seal Logo
- Motto: "Pride. Purpose. Progress."
- Interactive map of Stanton, California
- Location in the United States
- Coordinates: 33°48′9″N 117°59′40″W
- Country: United States
- State: California
- County: Orange
- Founded: 1911
- Incorporated: June 4, 1956

Government
  - Type: Council–manager
  - Mayor: David J. Shawver
  - Mayor Pro-Tem: Gary Taylor
  - City council: Victor Barrios; John D. Warren; Donald Torres
  - City Manager: Hannah Shin-Heydorn

Area
  - Total: 3.10 sq mi (8.03 km^{2})
  - Land: 3.10 sq mi (8.03 km^{2})
  - Water: 0 sq mi (0.00 km^{2}) 0%
- Elevation: 66 ft (20 m)

Population (2020)
  - Total: 37,962
  - Density: 12,212.0/sq mi (4,715.07/km^{2})
- Time zone: UTC-8 (PST)
  - Summer (DST): UTC-7 (PDT)
- ZIP code: 90680
- Area code: 657/714
- FIPS code: 06-73962
- GNIS feature ID: 1661501
- Website: www.stantonca.gov

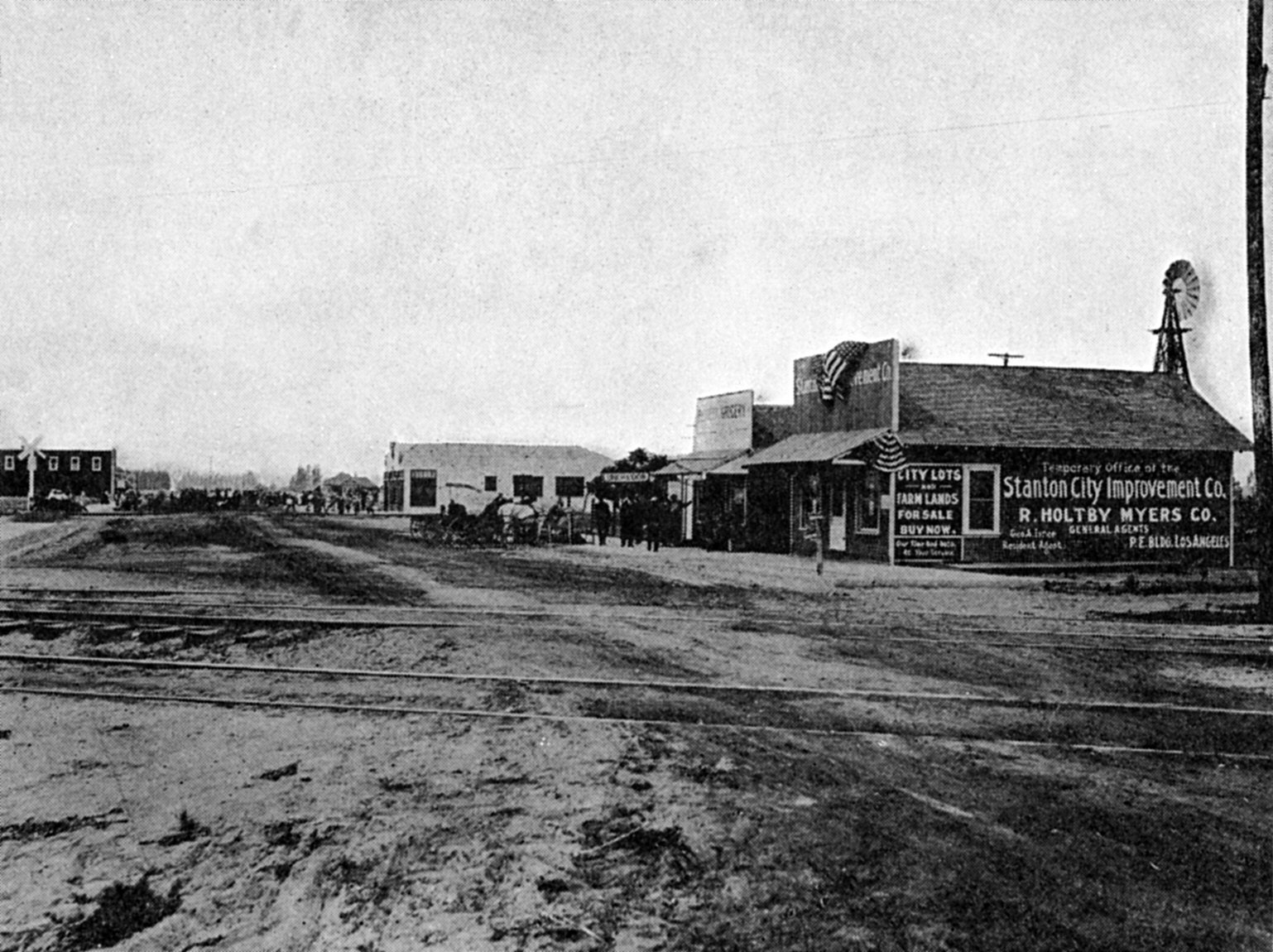
Downtown Stanton, 1913

Stanton is a city in northern Orange County, California, United States, within the Los Angeles metropolitan area. The population was 37,962 at the 2020 United States census. The city was incorporated in 1956 and operates under the council–manager form of government, providing a full range of municipal services. Stanton is bounded by Cypress on the west, Anaheim on the north and east, and Garden Grove on the east and south.

== History ==
During the Spanish colonial period, northern Orange County along with much of the LA Basin had been granted to Manuel Nieto in 1784 under the Rancho Los Nietos. After Nietos' death, his heirs partitioned the land into five smaller ranchos under Mexican governance. The current boundaries of the city roughly lies over two of five descending ranchos of Rancho Los Alamitos and Rancho Los Coyotes.

On November 4, 1905, the Los Angeles Interurban Railway started service on the Santa Ana Line. It ran along an almost perfectly straight line between Watts and Santa Ana. Access to transportation allowed the population of the rural area to grow. This area is now Stanton and West Anaheim.

The original name recorded by the Railway was Benedict. In 1911, the name was changed to Stanton after Philip A. Stanton, a Republican assemblyman for Los Angeles from 1903 to 1909, who was recorded to have assisted the formation of the territory.

In 1908, the privately owned Pacific Electric Railway leased the Santa Ana Line and took over the service, extending its regional light-rail system. Passenger service to Santa Ana was discontinued in 1950, shortly after the railway was taken over by the Metropolitan Transportation Agency. Today, the easement still is owned by the Orange County Transportation Authority (OCTA). It crosses the intersections of Beach Boulevard/Pacific Street and Cerritos Avenue/Western Avenue.

The first City of Stanton was incorporated in 1911 and was then the largest city in Orange County by area. The main motivation for incorporation was the City of Anaheim's plan to build a "sewage farm" to the west of their city. Former Speaker of the California State Assembly Phillip Ackley Stanton assisted in the incorporation and the city was named Stanton in his honor. In 1924, the residents voted to dis-incorporate to avoid the cost of building roads in the city.

In the early 1950s, the area had experienced a post-war population boom and the neighboring cities rapidly annexed land. In May 1956, the citizens responded by re-incorporating into today's City of Stanton.

The city was impacted by the Garden Grove chemical leak, as 85% of the city was evacuated.

== Geography ==
Stanton is directly bordered by Anaheim to the north and Cypress to the west. A southern salient of the city largely bisects the city of Garden Grove from its West Garden Grove neighborhood, making the city as a whole a neighbor of Stanton to the east, south, and west.

According to the United States Census Bureau, the city has a total area of 3.15 square miles (8.2 km^{2}), all land.

=== Climate ===
Climate data for Stanton, California
Month	Jan	Feb	Mar	Apr	May	Jun	Jul	Aug	Sep	Oct	Nov	Dec	Year
Record high °F (°C)	91 (33)	91 (33)	97 (36)	104 (40)	99 (37)	107 (42)	107 (42)	102 (39)	108 (42)	107 (42)	96 (36)	89 (32)	108 (42)
Mean daily maximum °F (°C)	67 (19)	67 (19)	67 (19)	71 (22)	73 (23)	77 (25)	81 (27)	82 (28)	81 (27)	77 (25)	72 (22)	67 (19)	74 (23)
Mean daily minimum °F (°C)	47 (8)	49 (9)	51 (11)	54 (12)	58 (14)	61 (16)	65 (18)	65 (18)	64 (18)	59 (15)	51 (11)	46 (8)	56 (13)
Record low °F (°C)	20 (−7)	34 (1)	37 (3)	39 (4)	48 (9)	50 (10)	58 (14)	54 (12)	52 (11)	45 (7)	37 (3)	29 (−2)	18 (−8)
Average precipitation inches (mm)	2.8 (71)	3.2 (81)	2.1 (53)	0.8 (20)	0.2 (5.1)	0.1 (2.5)	0.0 (0.0)	0.0 (0.0)	0.2 (5.1)	0.7 (18)	1.1 (28)	2.0 (51)	13.2 (334.7)
Source 1:
Source 2:

== Demographics ==
Historical population
Census	Pop.	Note	%±
1920	695		—
1930	926		33.2%
1940	953		2.9%
1950	1,145		20.1%
1960	11,163		874.9%
1970	18,186		62.9%
1980	23,723		30.4%
1990	30,491		28.5%
2000	37,403		22.7%
2010	38,186		2.1%
2020	37,962		−0.6%
2024 (est.)	41,188	▲	8.5%
U.S. Decennial Census; 1860–1870 1880-1890; 1900 1910 1920; 1930 1940 1950; 1960 1970 1980; 1990 2000 2010; 2020

Stanton first appeared as a city in the 1920 U.S. census and was coextensive with the now defunct Stanton Township. In 1960, it was assigned to the newly defined Santa-Ana Orange census county division.

=== Racial and ethnic composition ===
Stanton city, California – Racial and ethnic composition Note: the US Census treats Hispanic/Latino as an ethnic category. This table excludes Latinos from the racial categories and assigns them to a separate category. Hispanics/Latinos may be of any race.
Race / Ethnicity (NH = Non-Hispanic)	Pop 1980	Pop 1990	Pop 2000	Pop 2010	Pop 2020	% 1980	% 1990	% 2000	% 2010	% 2020
White alone (NH)	16,904	15,992	11,295	8,340	5,968	71.26%	52.45%	30.20%	21.84%	15.72%
Black or African American alone (NH)	208	650	721	703	666	0.88%	2.13%	1.93%	1.84%	1.75%
Native American or Alaska Native alone (NH)	251	123	155	107	58	1.06%	0.40%	0.41%	0.28%	0.15%
Asian alone (NH)	1,480	3,476	5,721	8,708	11,250	6.24%	11.40%	15.30%	22.80%	29.63%
Native Hawaiian or Pacific Islander alone (NH)	1,480	3,476	322	202	208	6.24%	11.40%	0.86%	0.53%	0.55%
Other race alone (NH)	32	41	57	75	198	0.13%	0.13%	0.15%	0.20%	0.52%
Mixed race or Multiracial (NH)	x	x	847	634	807	x	x	2.26%	1.66%	2.13%
Hispanic or Latino (any race)	4,848	10,209	18,285	19,417	18,807	20.44%	33.48%	48.89%	50.85%	49.54%
Total	23,723	30,491	37,403	38,186	37,962	100.00%	100.00%	100.00%	100.00%	100.00%

=== 2020 census ===
As of the 2020 census, Stanton had a population of 37,962 and a population density of 12,241.9 inhabitants per square mile (4,726.6/km^{2}). The census reported that 98.2% of the population lived in households, 0.8% lived in non-institutionalized group quarters, and 1.0% were institutionalized. 100.0% of residents lived in urban areas, while 0.0% lived in rural areas.

There were 11,018 households in Stanton, of which 40.8% had children under the age of 18 living in them. Of all households, 48.1% were married-couple households, 7.2% were cohabiting couple households, 17.4% were households with a male householder and no spouse or partner present, and 27.3% were households with a female householder and no spouse or partner present. About 16.9% of all households were made up of individuals and 8.2% had someone living alone who was 65 years of age or older. The average household size was 3.39. There were 8,399 families (76.2% of all households).

The median age was 37.4 years. 22.7% of residents were under the age of 18, 9.9% were aged 18 to 24, 26.9% were aged 25 to 44, 26.9% were aged 45 to 64, and 13.6% were 65 years of age or older. For every 100 females, there were 97.5 males, and for every 100 females age 18 and over there were 95.4 males age 18 and over.

There were 11,361 housing units at an average density of 3,663.7 units per square mile (1,414.6 units/km^{2}). Of these, 97.0% were occupied, 49.4% were owner-occupied, and 50.6% were renter-occupied. The vacancy rate was 3.0%, including a homeowner vacancy rate of 0.5% and a rental vacancy rate of 3.2%.

=== 2010 census ===
The 2010 United States census reported that Stanton had a population of 38,186. The population density was 12,122.5 inhabitants per square mile (4,680.5/km^{2}). The racial makeup of Stanton was 16,991 (44.5%) White, 858 (2.2%) African American, 405 (1.1%) Native American, 8,831 (23.1%) Asian, 217 (0.6%) Pacific Islander, 9,274 (24.3%) from other races, and 1,610 (4.2%) from two or more races. Hispanic or Latino of any race were 19,417 persons (50.8%). Non-Hispanic Whites were 21.8% of the population.

The Census reported that 37,836 people (99.1% of the population) lived in households, 92 (0.2%) lived in non-institutionalized group quarters, and 258 (0.7%) were institutionalized.

There were 10,825 households, out of which 5,015 (46.3%) had children under the age of 18 living in them, 5,551 (51.3%) were opposite-sex married couples living together, 1,798 (16.6%) had a female householder with no husband present, 860 (7.9%) had a male householder with no wife present. There were 645 (6.0%) unmarried opposite-sex partnerships, and 74 (0.7%) same-sex married couples or partnerships. 1,958 households (18.1%) were made up of individuals, and 846 (7.8%) had someone living alone who was 65 years of age or older. The average household size was 3.50. There were 8,209 families (75.8% of all households); the average family size was 3.90.

The population was spread out, with 10,566 people (27.7%) under the age of 18, 4,062 people (10.6%) aged 18 to 24, 11,289 people (29.6%) aged 25 to 44, 8,455 people (22.1%) aged 45 to 64, and 3,814 people (10.0%) who were 65 years of age or older. The median age was 33.0 years. For every 100 females, there were 98.0 males. For every 100 females age 18 and over, there were 95.8 males.

There were 11,283 housing units at an average density of 3,582.0 per square mile (1,383.0/km^{2}), of which 5,418 (50.1%) were owner-occupied, and 5,407 (49.9%) were occupied by renters. The homeowner vacancy rate was 2.1%; the rental vacancy rate was 4.3%. 18,033 people (47.2% of the population) lived in owner-occupied housing units and 19,803 people (51.9%) lived in rental housing units.

According to the 2010 United States Census, Stanton had a median household income of $50,542, with 16.9% of the population living below the federal poverty line.

=== Economic characteristics ===
In 2023, the US Census Bureau estimated that the median household income was $81,455, and the per capita income was $36,027. About 9.4% of families and 11.9% of the population were below the poverty line.

=== Crime ===
2023 Uniform Crime Report data
	Aggravated Assault	Homicide	Rape	Robbery	Burglary	Larceny Theft	Motor Vehicle Theft	Arson
Stanton	115	3	10	49	119	529	127	6

== Economy ==
According to the city's 2021 Comprehensive Annual Financial Report, the top employers in the city are:

#	Employer	# of Employees
1	Rowntree Gardens	334
2	The Home Depot	165
3	Super King Market	128
4	CR Transfer Inc.	122
5	Great Scott Tree Service	122
6	All Metals Process	105
7	Adventure City	105
8	Custom Pipe & Coupling	104
9	USS Cal Builders	95
10	Wal-Mart Neighborhood Market	93

== Arts and culture ==
The Orange County Public Library has a branch Library in Stanton.

== Parks and recreation ==
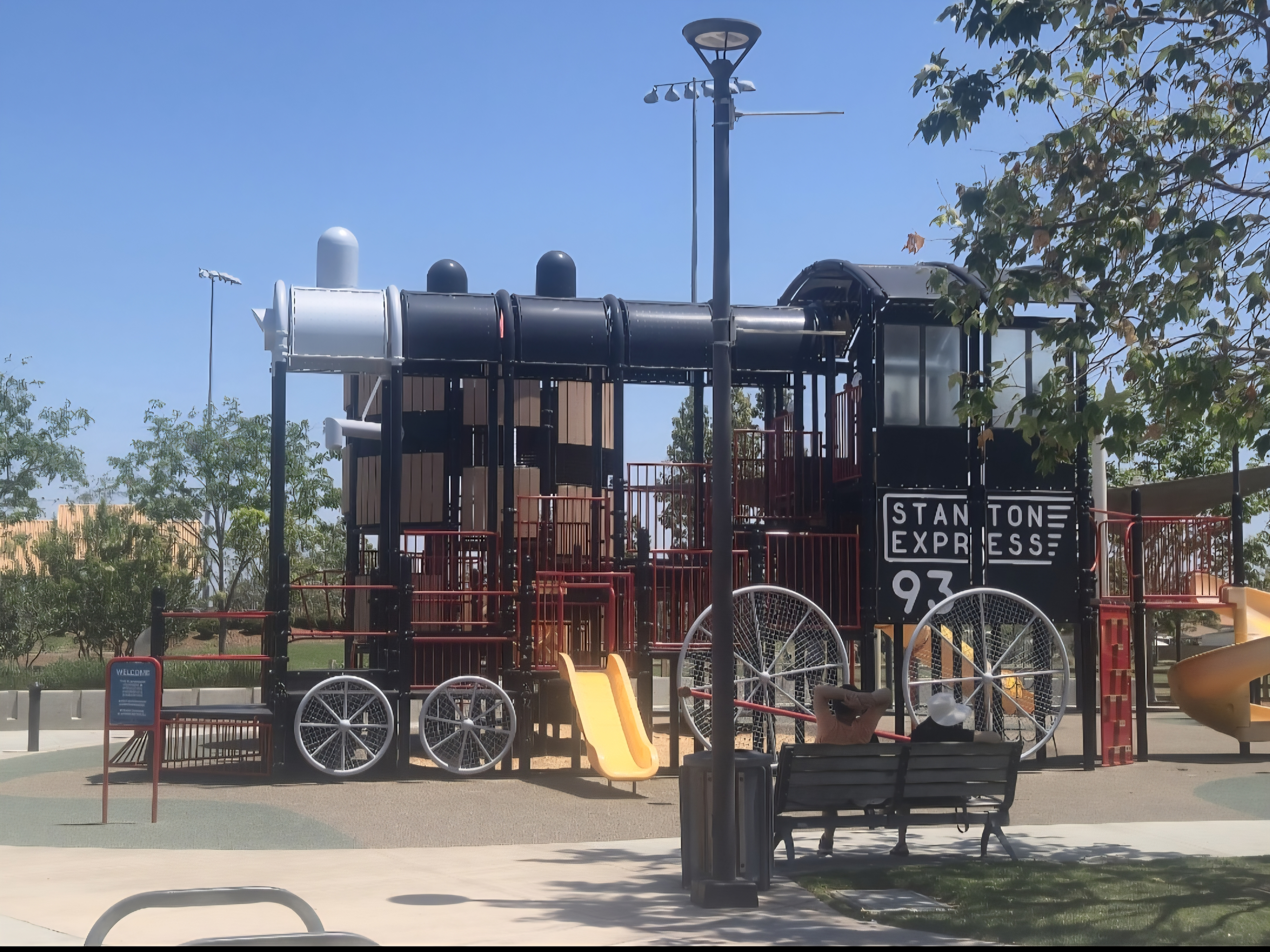
Train Playground at Central Park

Stanton has ten parks, including Stanton Central Park, which features a tennis center, sports complex, and community garden. Lions-Stock Park includes a sports facility and community center.

Adventure City is an amusement park in Stanton.

== Government ==
=== Local ===
Under its city charter, Stanton operates under a council–manager government. Legislative authority is vested in a city council of five nonpartisan members, who hire a professional city manager to oversee day-to-day operations. The mayor serves as the presiding officer of the city council in a first among equals role. Under the city's term limits, an individual may serve a maximum of two terms as a city council member.

In response to a California Voting Rights Act lawsuit, the city transitioned to council members elected by district instead of at large.

David J. Shawver is mayor.

=== Federal, state and county representation ===
In the United States House of Representatives,

- California's 46th congressional district, represented by Democrat Lou Correa since 2017.

In the California State Senate,

- the 29th senatorial district, represented by Democrat Eloise Reyes since 2020, and
- the 36th senatorial district, represented by Republican Tony Strickland since 2022.

In the California State Assembly,

- the 70th Assembly district, represented by Republican Tri Ta since 2022.

On the Orange County Board of Supervisors,

- the 4th supervisorial district, represented by Democrat Doug Chaffee since 2019.

== Education ==
Residents of the city are served by the following public school districts:

- Garden Grove Unified School District.
- Savanna School District, serves elementary students.
- Magnolia School District, which include Baden-Powell and Pyles School.
- Anaheim Union High School District.

Saint Polycarp School is a K-8 Catholic School.

== Infrastructure ==
=== Roads ===
Though Stanton has no freeways within its city limits, one California state highway, Beach Boulevard (SR 39), runs north-south through the city. Other north-south roads include Knott, Western, Dale, and Magnolia Avenues. East-west streets in Stanton include Lampson, Chapman, Orangewood, Katella and Cerritos Avenues. Garden Grove Boulevard and Gilbert Street have short sections along the city limits of Stanton to the south and east, respectively. SR 39 provides access to the Garden Grove Freeway (SR 22) south of the city limits of Stanton.

=== Bus ===
Orange County Transportation Authority operates bus transportation in Stanton.

=== Emergency services ===
Fire protection in Stanton is provided by the Orange County Fire Authority, with ambulance transport by Care Ambulance Service. The Orange County Sheriff's Department (OCSD) provides law enforcement services under the command of Police Chief Cruz Alday. In 1987 the city disbanded its police and fire departments and contracted with county agencies.

=== Water Services ===
Water in Stanton is supplied by the Golden State Water, which sources its water from the Metropolitan Water District of Southern California, importing water from the Colorado River Aqueduct and the State Water Project. In addition, groundwater is pumped from the Orange County Groundwater Basin.
