= Anaheim Union High School District =

School district in California

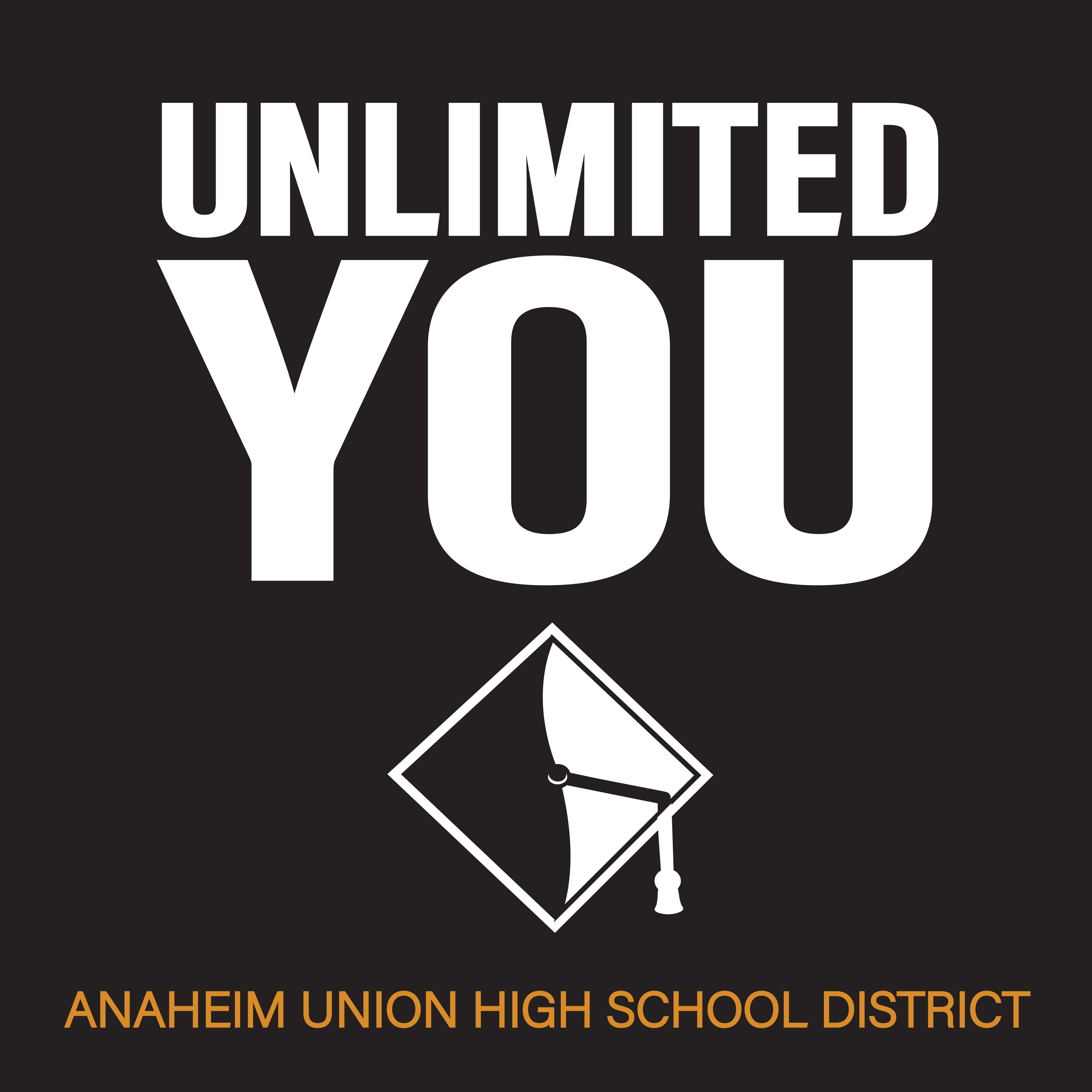

Address
- 501 Crescent Way Anaheim, California, 92803; United States
- Coordinates: 33°50′20.27″N 117°56′56.03″W

District information
- Type: Public
- Motto: Unlimited You
- Grades: 7th-12th
- Established: 1898
- Superintendent: Jaron Fried
- Asst. superintendent(s): Dr. Nancy Nien, Brad Jackson
- Accreditation: Western Association of Schools and Colleges
- Schools: 19
- Budget: $566,368,409 (2022-2023)
- NCES District ID: 0602630

Students and staff
- Students: 29,183 (2020–2021)
- Teachers: 1,203.57 (FTE)
- Staff: 1,294.22 (FTE)
- Student–teacher ratio: 24.25:1
- Athletic conference: CIF Southern Section

Other information
- Website: www.auhsd.us

The Anaheim Union High School District (AUHSD) is a public school district serving portions of the Orange County cities of Anaheim, Buena Park, Cypress, La Palma, and Stanton. It oversees seven junior high schools (7-8), seven high schools (9-12), one secondary selective magnet school (Oxford Academy), one special education school, and two alternative education sites.

Its superintendent, Elizabeth Novack, was fired in December 2013 without public explanation. The Board of Trustees appointed Michael Matsuda, the district's former BTSA Coordinator who also currently serves as Secretary on the North Orange County Community College District Board of Trustees.

The school district has gained brief national notoriety twice: once in 1968 when members of the organization Mothers Organized for Moral Stability, inspired by the information in the pamphlet "Is the School House the Proper Place to Teach Raw Sex?", flooded a school board meeting and demanded that a course in sex education at the school be suspended, and again in 1978 when it banned the novels Silas Marner and Gone with the Wind from the school curriculum. The books and the course have long since been reinstated.

In 2024, the school district has received backlash from the local community as a result of its decision for a mass reduction in force (RIF), with the intent to lay off 10% of teachers (119 out of 1,259) increasing to now 253 teachers district-wide. In response to recent backlash, Michael Matsuda claims the layoffs were because of the expiration of federal funding at the start of the COVID-19 pandemic and a drop in student enrollment. As of May 2024, the district has released a joint statement with the Anaheim Secondary Teachers Association that they’ve rescinded all RIF notifications.

Anaheim Union High School District closed the site of Orangeview Junior High School in the Summer of 2025 to become the future Hope School. The Orangeview students and staff members moved to Western High School property to become one shared school. During this merger, the community faces local families taking their children to other schools in or outside the Anaheim Union High School District.

In January 2025, Michael Matsuda resigned for District Superintendent later having the position filled by Assistant Superintendent Jaron Freid

== High schools ==
- Anaheim High School (Established 1898), serves the Anaheim Colony District
- Orangeview Western 7-12 School (Established 2025), serves the western end of Anaheim, southwest Buena Park and northwest Stanton
- Magnolia High School (Established 1961), serves the Southwest Anaheim region and northeast Stanton
- Savanna High School (Established 1961), serves the Northwest Anaheim region and southeast Buena Park
- Loara High School (Established 1962), serves the Anaheim Resort District
- John F. Kennedy High School (Established 1964), serves La Palma and small portions of Cypress and Buena Park
- Katella High School (Established 1966), serves the Southeast Anaheim region
- Cypress High School (Established 1973), serves a majority of Cypress
- Oxford Academy (Established 1998, 7th-12th grades)

=== Former high schools ===
Los Alamitos High School (Established 1967, was in the Anaheim Union High School District until 1980 when it left to become part of the new Los Alamitos Unified School District.

Western High School (Established 1957, closed in 2025 to merge with Orangeview Junior High School to become Orangeview Western 7-12 School)

From 1898 through 1954, Anaheim Union High School was a four-year high school. Starting in the 1954-55 school year, AUHSD 7th through 12th grade education was split between three-year junior high school (grades 7-9) and three-year high school (10-12). This would continue until the 1980-81 school year, when junior high schools became two-year (7-8) and high schools became four-year (9-12) institutions.

== Junior high schools ==
- Ball Junior High School (Established 1962)
- Brookhurst Junior High School (Established 1956)
- Dale Junior High School (Established 1959)
- Lexington Junior High School (Established 1972)
- Orangeview Junior High School (Established 1957, Site is Temporarily Closed to become new site for Hope School)
- South Junior High School (Established 1967)
- Sycamore Junior High School (Established 1961)
- Walker Junior High School (Established 1959)

=== Former junior high schools ===
- Apollo Junior High School (Established 1967, closed in 1979, demolished)
- Crescent Junior High School (Established 1961, closed in 1979, demolished)
- John C. Fremont Junior High School (Established 1912, closed in 1979, demolished)
- La Palma Junior High School (Established 1964, closed in 1980. Now Hope School - AUHSD Special Needs)
- Oxford Junior High School (Established 1965, closed in 1980. Now Oxford Academy)
- Trident Junior High School (Established 1960, closed in 1980. Now Polaris High School - AUHSD independent study continuation high school)
- Orangeview Junior High School (Established 1957, closed in 2025 due to declining enrollment. Now merged with Western High School to form Orangeview Western 7-12 School)
- Pine Junior High School (Established 1968, now Christa McAuliffe Middle School) and Oak Junior High School (Established 1962, now Oak Middle School) were formerly in Anaheim Union High School District until 1980, but are now in the Los Alamitos Unified School District.

== Alternative ==
- Hope School ( For disabled students)

== Mascots ==
- Anaheim High School - Colonists
- Cypress High School - Centurions
- Katella High School - Knights
- Hope School - Tigers
- John F. Kennedy High School - Fighting Irish
- Loara High School - Saxons
- Magnolia High School - Sentinels
- Oxford Academy - Patriots (Oxford Junior High School, 1965-79: Wildcats)
- Savanna High School - Rebels
- Orangeview Western 7-12 School - Pioneers (Western High School), Panthers (Orangeview Junior High School)
- Apollo Junior High School - Astros
- Ball Junior High School - Blackhawks
- Brookhurst Junior High School - Spartans
- Crescent Junior High School - Crusaders
- Dale Junior High School - Lancers
- John C. Fremont Junior High School - Junior Colonists
- Gilbert Junior High School - Gladiators
- La Palma Junior High School - Patriots
- Lexington Junior High School - Lions
- South Junior High School - Eagles
- Sycamore Junior High School - Buccaneers
- Trident Junior High School - Dolphins
- Walker Junior High School - Vikings

== Feeder districts ==
- Anaheim Elementary School District
- Buena Park School District
- Centralia School District
- Cypress School District
- Magnolia School District
- Savanna School District

== Gallery ==
An older logo
