= Savannah, California =

Savannah
- Former settlement
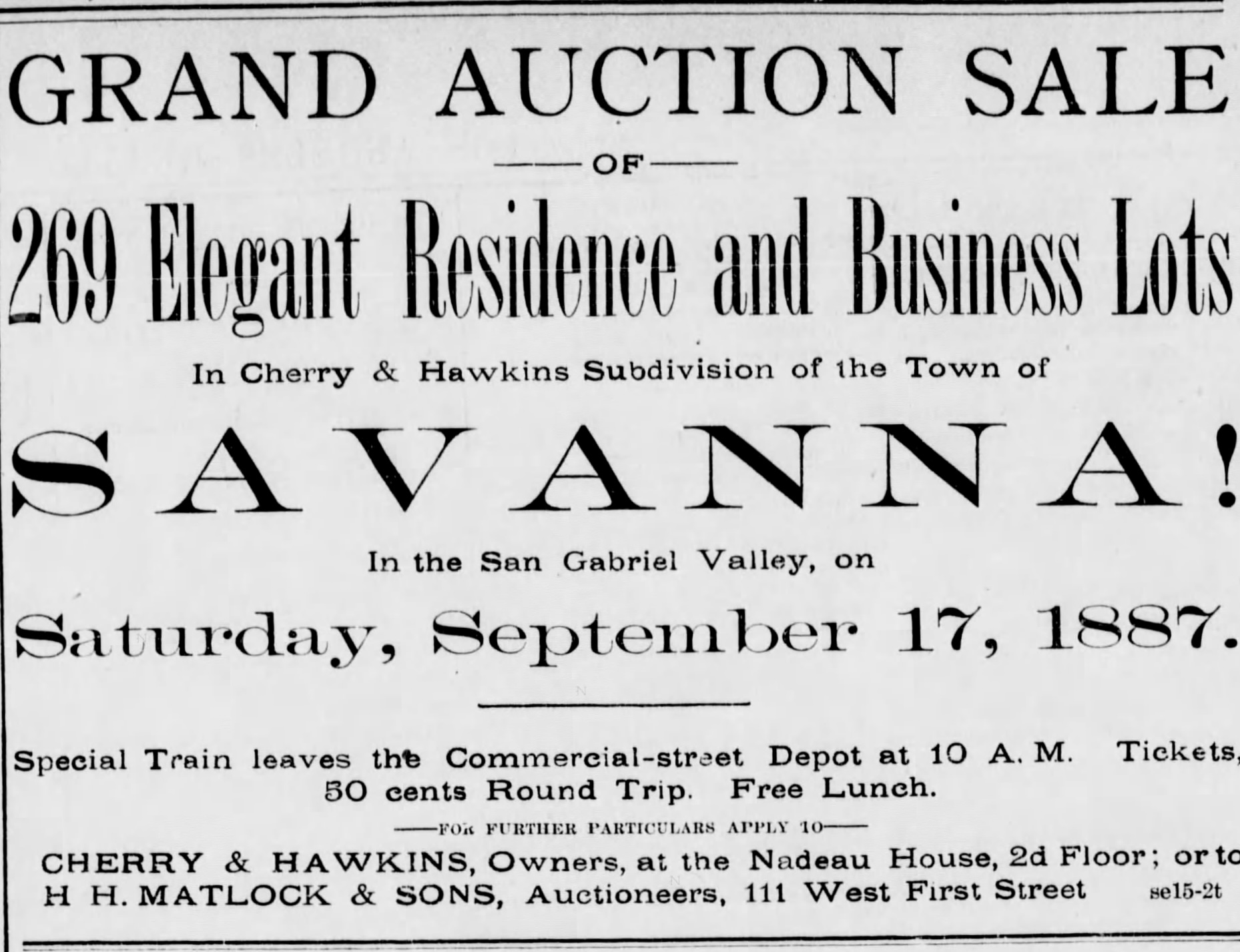

- Location in California
- Coordinates: 34°04′36″N 118°03′48″W
- Country: United States
- State: California
- County: Los Angeles County
- Elevation: 276 ft (84 m)

Savannah (also, Savanna) is a former settlement in Los Angeles County, California, USA. The rail depot of that name was located on the line of the Southern Pacific Railroad between San Gabriel and El Monte, at an elevation of 276 feet (84 m).

Savannah was promoted with considerable dignity in 1887–88 but vanished, nevertheless; the neighborhood of the depot has been absorbed by Rosemead. The name survives in Savanna High School, Savanna School District, both located in Orange County that seceded from Los Angeles County in 1889, and Savannah Elementary School in Rosemead.

Savannah was the location of Camp Monte, a Rebel base where State militias trained openly for participation in the Civil War until Federal troops suppressed it by establishing Camp Carleton in 1862. Camp Monte is recalled today in "Johnny Rebel," the former mascot of Savanna High School and name for a statue of a Civil-War era soldier that used to be in the quad.

== See also ==
- Savannah Memorial Park – California Historic Landmark No. 1046
- 1880s Southern California real estate boom
