= Mary Calderone =

American physician, author and advocate (1904–1998)

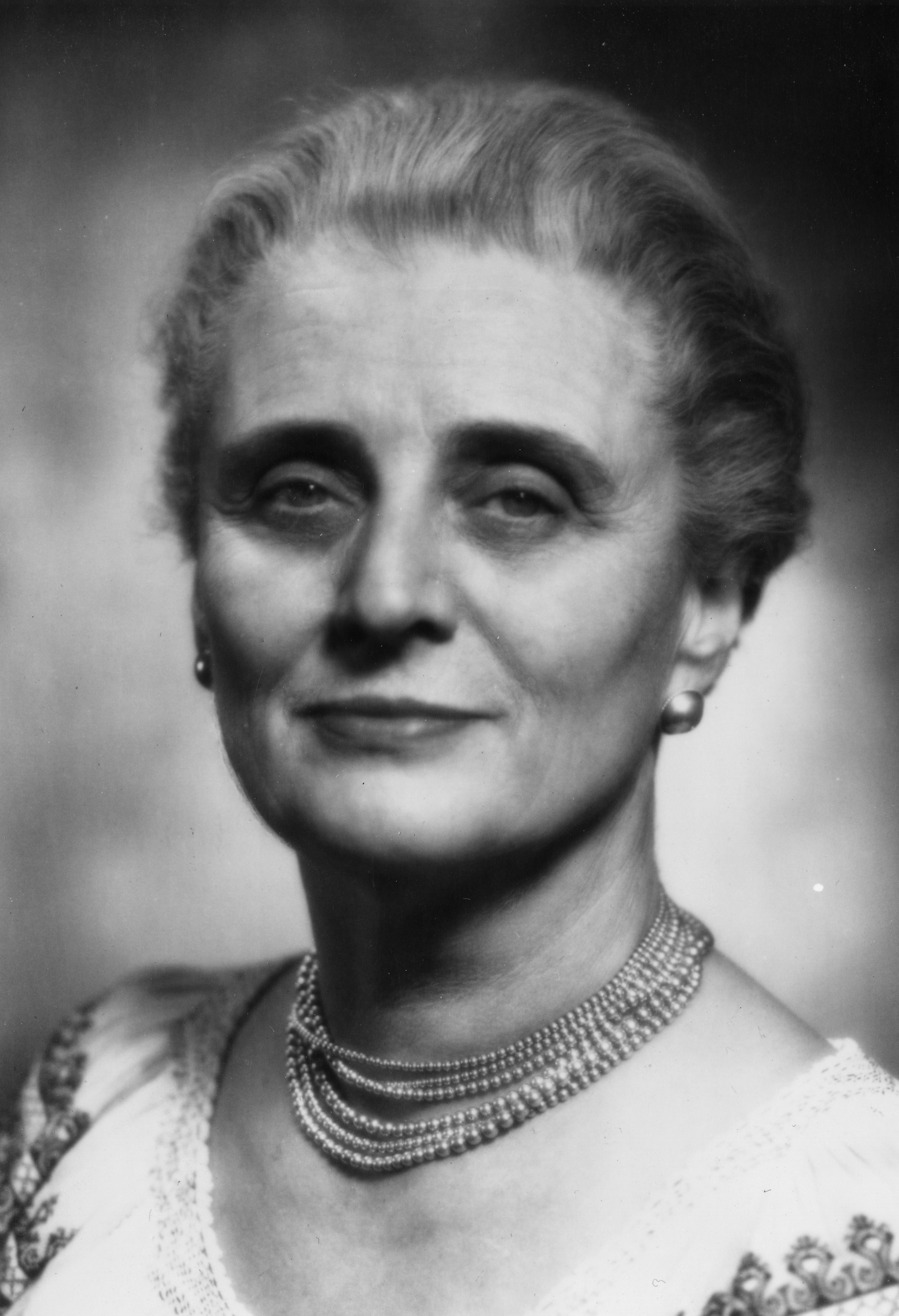
- Portrait of Mary Calderone at the Smithsonian Institution Archives
- Born: Mary Rose Steichen; July 1, 1904; New York City, New York, U.S.
- Died: October 24, 1998 (aged 94); Kennett Square, Pennsylvania, U.S.
- Education: Vassar College (AB); University of Rochester (MD); Columbia University (MPH)
- Occupation: Physician
- Employers: Planned Parenthood; SIECUS
- Known for: Sex education
- Spouses: W. Lon Martin (m. 1926; div. 1933) Frank A. Calderone (m. 1941; died 1987)
- Parent(s): Edward Steichen; Clara Smith
- Relatives: Carl Sandburg (uncle); Willard Dryden Paddock (uncle)

Mary Steichen Calderone (born Mary Rose Steichen; July 1, 1904 – October 24, 1998) was an American physician, author, public speaker, and public health advocate for reproductive rights and sex education.

In 1953, Mary Calderone became the first female medical director of Planned Parenthood. During her tenure, the organization started advocating for reform in abortion laws. Under her leadership, Planned Parenthood organized a national conference of medical professionals on the subject in 1955, known as “Abortion in the United States." This conference marked the first instance of physicians and professionals advocating for the reform of abortion laws, contributing significantly to the creation of a movement for the reform of abortion laws in the U.S.

In 1960, after the Food and Drug Administration (FDA) approved the first oral contraceptive, Calderone lobbied the American Medical Association (AMA) to endorse contraception as standard medical practice. After a four-year effort, she successfully reversed the AMA's policy against providing birth control information to patients, helping to integrate birth control into mainstream American medicine.

Shifting her focus toward sex education, Calderone left Planned Parenthood in 1964 to establish and serve as the Executive Director of SIECUS (Sex Information and Education Council of the United States). During her time at SIECUS, she delivered lectures across the United States, addressing various audiences, including high school and college students, parents, educators, religious leaders, and professional groups, on the topic of sex education. She retired from SIECUS in 1982 at the age of 78.

== Early life and family ==
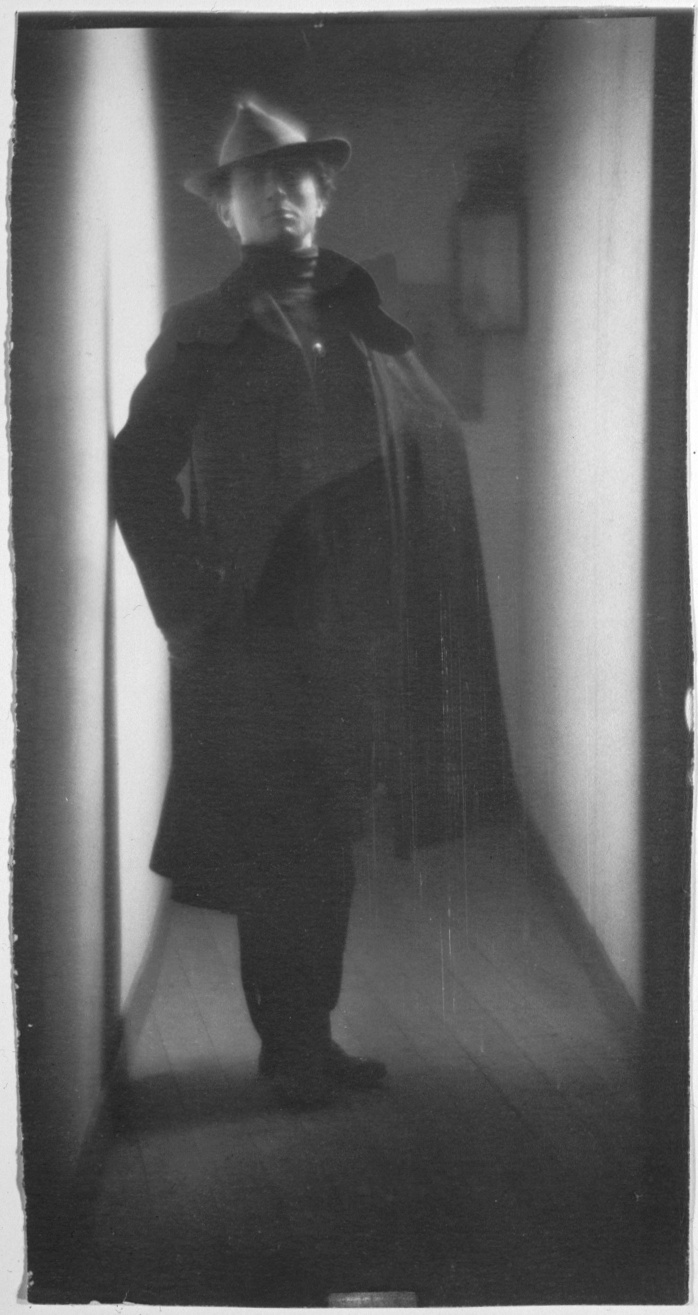
Calderone's father, Edward Steichen, photographed by Fred Holland Day (1901)

Mary Calderone was born in New York, New York on July 1, 1904, as Mary Rose Steichen, the first child of Edward Steichen, a Luxembourgish-American photographer and artist, and his first wife, Clara Emma Smith, an American singer. Following her birth, the Steichen family relocated to Paris, France, and then later to Voulangis, France, a small farming village approximately 32 km east of Paris. Her younger sister, Charlotte "Kate" Rodina Steichen, was born in Paris on May 27, 1908.

While in Voulangis, the family frequently received visits from various artists and colleagues of Edward Steichen, including Constantin Brâncuși, Auguste Rodin, Isadora Duncan, Paul Cézanne, Henri Matisse, and Pablo Picasso. Biographer Jeffrey Moran suggests that Mary's upbringing in a bohemian environment, with her well-known father, her uncle, the poet Carl Sandburg, and Quaker background played a role in shaping her liberal perspective on sex and her passionate nature. For instance, at the age of six, she expressed her opinions about Constantin Brâncuși's sculptures, particularly his horizontal-headed bird pieces, which she believed would hinder the birds from singing. Brâncuși subsequently adjusted his artistic approach.

When the First World War began in 1914, the family fled to New York. Calderone's parents separated soon after and sent Mary to live in New York City at the home of their friends, Dr. Leopold and Elizabeth Stieglitz, brother and sister-in-law of Steichen's friend and photography colleague, Alfred Stieglitz. Calderone's interest in medicine began as she accompanied Leonard Stieglitz on his hospital rounds.

While in New York, Calderone attended the Brearley School for her secondary education. She then matriculated at Vassar College, earning her A.B. in Chemistry in 1925. Initially, she pursued a career in theater and studied at the American Laboratory Theatre for three years. Notably, she served as the model for the figures on the Pratt Institute flagpole, a bronze sculpture created by her uncle, Willard Dryden Paddock, and erected in 1926 to commemorate the soldiers who served in World War I.

In 1926, Calderone married actor W. Lon Martin and had two daughters, Nell (1926) and Linda (1928). With her marriage declining, she abandoned her acting career and divorced in 1933. In 1935, her eight-year-old daughter Nell died of pneumonia, which, along with her unrealized acting aspirations and divorce, led Calderone into a period of depression. After an in-depth series of aptitude tests at the Johnson O'Connor Research Foundation in New York, at age 30, she decided to return to education and pursue a career in medicine.

She earned her M.D. degree from the University of Rochester medical school in 1939 and later obtained her M.P.H. from Columbia University in 1942. For her field study at Columbia, Calderone worked as a health officer-in-training at Lower East Side District Health Center in New York City, where she met Frank A. Calderone, whom she married in 1941. Frank Calderone served as the head of the Lower East Side District Health Center, and after serving as the first deputy health commissioner of New York City from 1943 to 1946, became a leading figure in the World Health Organization (WHO) during its formative years. The Calderone Prize, the most prestigious prize in the field of public health, is named after him. The couple had two daughters, Francesca (1943) and Maria (1946).

== Career ==
=== Planned Parenthood ===
Calderone served as a physician in the Great Neck, New York public school system from 1949 to 1953. Her work in this role gained her recognition in public health circles, as she attended the American Public Health Association's annual conferences during a time when female public health professionals and physicians were relatively rare. In 1953, William Vogt, the National Director of the Planned Parenthood Federation of America, offered Calderone the position of Medical Director. Despite being advised by her public health colleagues that taking the job would be "professional suicide", Calderone accepted the position with the hope of legitimizing family planning in the fields of medicine and public health.

Calderone's 11-year tenure at Planned Parenthood was marked by several significant contributions. In 1955, she organized "Abortion in the United States", a national conference of medical professionals that instigated the movement to legalize abortion. This was the first instance of physicians and other professionals advocating reform of the laws that criminalized abortion, and it played a key role in creating a movement for the reform of abortion laws in the U.S. The conference, which had no advanced publicity at the time, resulted in a book, Abortion in the United States, which was published in 1958 to critical acclaim and remains a classic in its field. According to historian Ellen S. More, “[i]n many ways the book was a milestone. Not only did it reveal a deep commitment among respected medical practitioners and scholars to treat abortion and contraception as subjects of legitimate research, but... because the book included a summary of the laws in every state pertaining to abortion, it became a reference for legal scholars and policy activists, not only physicians.”

Calderone's efforts also played a role in changing Planned Parenthood's approach to abortion. Before her involvement, the organization and its founder, Margaret Sanger, had avoided addressing the subject of abortion, focusing instead on promoting birth control as a means to prevent unwanted pregnancies. Today, Planned Parenthood is the largest single provider of reproductive health services and the largest single provider of abortion in the United States.

Furthermore, Calderone worked as a liaison between Planned Parenthood and the public health establishment to advocate for the mainstream integration of birth control into American medicine. She successfully lobbied professional medical groups such as the American Public Health Association (APHA) and the American Medical Association (AMA) to endorse contraception as a standard medical practice. In 1959, the APHA issued a public statement endorsing family planning as part of routine medical care, emphasizing the importance of individual choice. Her most significant success came in 1964 when she persuaded the more conservative AMA to overturn its long-standing policy against providing birth control information to patients and to endorse contraception as part of standard medical practice.

During her tenure at Planned Parenthood, Calderone authored various articles for both popular and professional publications, as well as books such as Release from Sexual Tensions (1960) and Manual of Contraceptive Practice (1964), which was a pioneering medical text.

=== SIECUS ===
Calderone's office at Planned Parenthood received a steady stream of letters from individuals seeking information not just about the physical aspects of sex but broader topics related to human sexuality. This influx of inquiries led Calderone to a realization that sexuality encompassed more than just genitality, and that sex education was inadequate in American society. She believed her work should extend beyond pregnancy prevention and that simply providing contraceptives was insufficient. Consequently, in 1964, Calderone left her position at Planned Parenthood and founded SIECUS (the Sex Information and Education Council of the United States), the nation's first and only single-issue advocacy group dedicated to promoting comprehensive sex education.

Driven by Calderone's dynamic nationwide lectures and guided by its mission statement, which aimed to establish human sexuality as a health-related subject, SIECUS functioned as an umbrella organization for school administrators, sex educators, physicians, social activists, and parents seeking resources for sexuality education. Calderone soon became a household name and "a magnet for publicity [as] articles in Seventeen, Look, McCall’s, Life Magazine, Parade, Playboy, and other popular magazines profiled her life and analyzed her arguments, [while] her appearances on TV shows such as the Dick Cavett Show and Sixty Minutes reached millions of viewers.”

Calderone retired from SIECUS in 1982 at the age of 78.

==== Criticism ====
While Calderone gained significant recognition for her positive approach to sex education, she also faced criticism. Her assertion that sex education should start in kindergarten, with age-appropriate lessons on topics like basic anatomy and consent, provoked opposition from right-wing politicians and religious conservative groups like Mothers Organized for Moral Stability (MOMS) and the John Birch Society, which spent an estimated $40 million on a smear campaign to discredit her.

In 1968, the Christian Crusade's Billy James Hargis and Gordon V. Drake targeted SIECUS and Calderone in the infamous Is the School House the Proper Place to Teach Raw Sex? pamphlet, as well as other similar fearmongering publications, making unfounded claims that the organization aimed to undermine Christian morality, promote promiscuity, and corrupt children. The pamphlet, which included deliberate misquotations and fabrications of events, also alleged that sex education is part of a "giant Communist conspiracy." Soon after, SIECUS and Calderone became targets of a nationwide smear campaign, with Calderone’s speaking appearances drawing picket lines and protests from ultra-conservative groups who followed her across the country.

In her 1970 book, Oh! Sex Education!, Village Voice writer Mary Breasted intended to defend sex education against its right-wing critics, but after exploring Calderone's views and interviewing her, she concluded that Calderone "advocated a sex education that was basically a form of moral indoctrination."

From 1968 to 1971, Congressman John Rarick of Louisiana read a series of denunciations of sex education, featuring Mary Calderone and SIECUS, into the Congressional Record. Rarick’s testimony emphasized insinuations of SIECUS’s ties to a global communist conspiracy. He wrote, “Through the promotion of pornography, drug use and the ‘New Morality,’ the will to resist the International Communist Conspiracy is being weakened... the downgrading of the influence of the family and religion play right into the hands of the Communists.”

By the mid-1970s, these attacks weakened Calderone's influence, and SIECUS's funding and resources began to dwindle. In 1978, she stepped down as the Executive Director but remained as President. Nevertheless, Calderone's commitment to sex education with a positive and morally neutral approach persisted, expanding the focus beyond the physical act of sex to address topics like puberty, consent, and sexism.

Psychiatrist Thomas Szasz singled out Calderone in his 1980 book, Sex by Prescription. A staunch opponent of the medicalization of behavior, Szasz criticized her "missionary dedication to take sex away from the divines and give it to the doctors." He called Calderone "confused and hypocritical," citing her statement that she was "not suggesting the distribution...of contraceptive information to teenagers."

=== Later career ===
Between 1982 and 1988, Calderone served as an adjunct professor in human sexuality at New York University. She authored several books on sex education, including The Family Book About Sexuality (1981; with Eric W. Johnson) and Talking with Your Child About Sex: Questions and Answers for Children from Birth to Puberty (1982; with James W. Ramey). She continued to be a frequent and popular lecturer and was the recipient of numerous professional and humanitarian awards.

=== Personal views on sex ===
Contrary to her opponents' portrayal of her as an "aging sexual libertine," Calderone, a practicing Quaker and grandmother, held personal convictions that did not align with the sexual revolution of the late 1960s. While she was adamant about sexual freedom, she personally believed that sex should be reserved for marriage and that the highest expression of sexuality was within a permanent, monogamous bond.

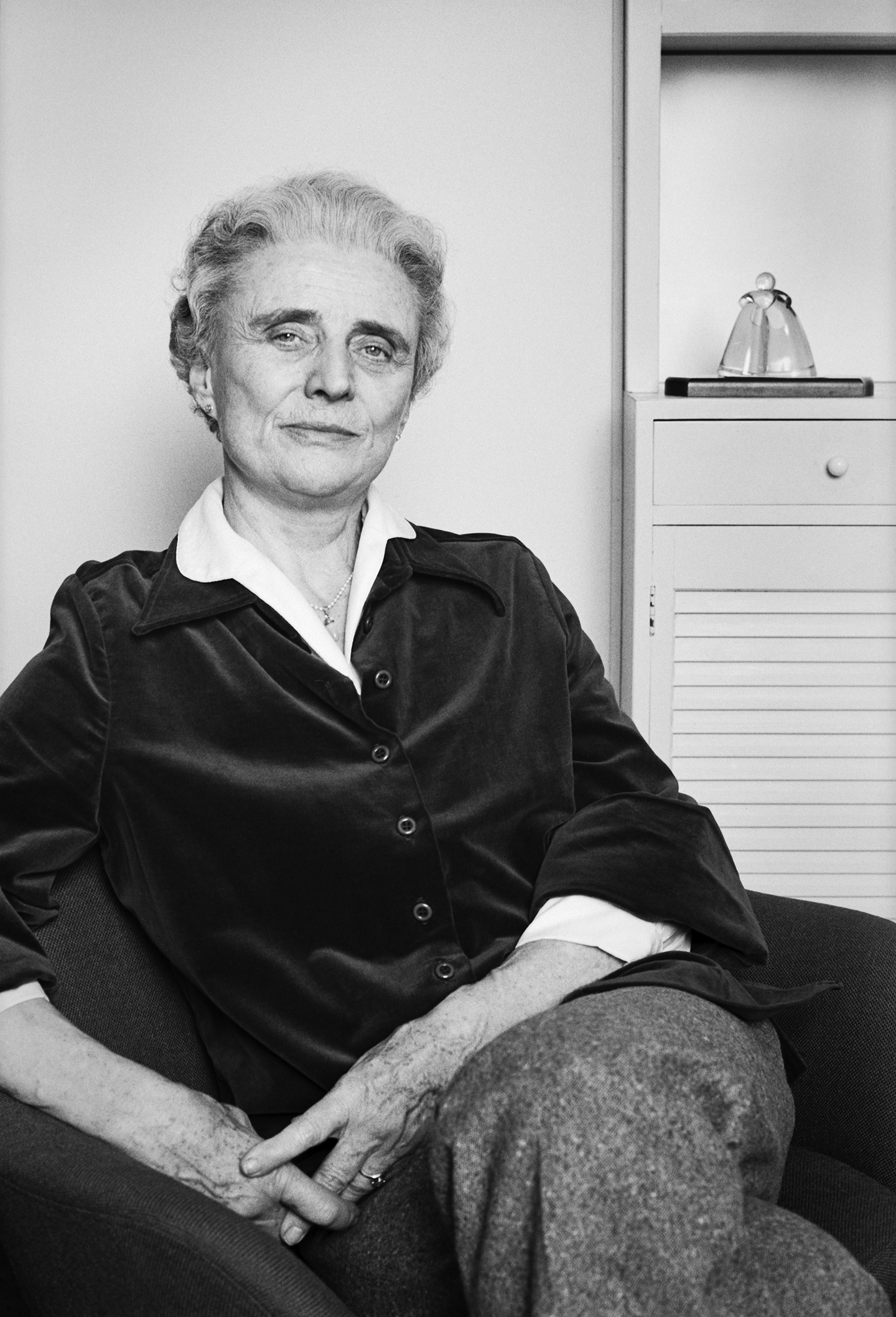
Mary Calderone photographed in 1976 by Lynn Gilbert

=== Death ===
Calderone was a resident of Kendal at Longwood, a Quaker continuing care retirement community in Kennett Square, Pennsylvania. She died in the skilled nursing facility there on October 24, 1998. She was 94.

== Awards and honors ==
Calderone has received numerous awards and honors both posthumously and over the course of her life.

- Browning Award for Prevention of Diseases, American Public Health Association
- Elizabeth Blackwell Award for Distinguished Services to Humanity, Hobart and William Smith Colleges
- Lifetime Achievement Award from the Schlesinger Library of Radcliffe/Harvard College
- The Award for Human Service from the Mental Health Association of New York
- Humanist of the Year from the American Humanist Association (1974)
- Margaret Sanger Award from Planned Parenthood Federation of America (1980)
- National Women’s Hall of Fame inductee (1998)

=== Honorary degrees ===
- D.Med. Science (honorary), Women's Medical College (now Drexel University College of Medicine), 1967.
- Doctor of Humane Letters (honorary), Newark State College (now Kean University), 1971.
- Doctor of Humane Letters (honorary), Dickinson College, 1981.
- Doctor of Humane Letters (honorary), Jersey City State College (now New Jersey City University), 1982.
- Doctor of Science (honorary), Adelphi University, 1971.
- Doctor of Science (honorary), Worcester Foundation Experimental Biology (now University of Massachusetts Medical School), 1974.
- Doctor of Science (honorary), Brandeis University, 1975.
- Doctor of Science (honorary), Haverford College, 1978.
- Doctor of Science (honorary), Columbia University, 1985.
- Doctor of Laws (honorary), Kenyon College, 1972.
- Ped.D. (honorary), Hofstra University, 1978.
- Doctor of Humanities (honorary), Bucknell University, 1982.

== Selected works and publications ==
- Steichen, Mary (1930). The First Picture Book: Everyday Things for Babies. New York, NY: Harcourt, Brace and Company. ISBN 978-1881270522.
- Steichen, Mary (1931). The Second Picture Book. New York, NY: Harcourt, Brace and Company.
- Calderone, Mary S., ed. (1958). Abortion in the United States; a conference sponsored by the Planned Parenthood Federation of America, inc. at Arden House and the New York Academy of Medicine. New York, NY: Hoeber-Harper.
- Calderone, Mary S. (1960). Release from sexual tensions: Toward an understanding of their causes and effects in marriage. New York, NY: Random House.
- Calderone, Mary S. (1964). Manual of Contraceptive Practice. The Williams & Wilkins Co.
- Calderone, Mary S. (1970). Manual of Family Planning and Contraceptive Practice. New York, NY: Lippincott Williams & Wilkins. ISBN 978-0683013108.
- Calderone, Mary S. (1974). Sexuality and human values: The personal dimension of sexual experience. Association Press. ISBN 978-0809618910.
- Calderone, Mary S. (1979). Questions and Answers about Love & Sex. St. Martin's Press. ISBN 9780312660413.
- Calderone, Mary S.; Johnson, Eric W. (1981). The Family Book About Sexuality. Harper & Row. ISBN 978-0060160685.
- Calderone, Mary S.; Ramey, James W. (1982). Talking With Your Child About Sex: Questions and Answers for Children from Birth to Puberty. New York, NY: Random House. ISBN 978-0394521244.

== See also ==
- Comprehensive sex education – Sex education instruction method
- History of women in the United States
- List of women's rights activists
- Sex education – Instruction on human sexuality issues
- Reproductive rights – Legal rights and freedoms relating to reproduction and reproductive health
- United States abortion-rights movement – Support for women's right to elective abortion
