= John Conley (American football) =

American football player (born 1950)

No. 81
- Position: Tight end

Personal information
- Born: October 22, 1950 (age 76); Charlotte, North Carolina, U.S.
- Listed height: 6 ft 3 in (1.91 m)
- Listed weight: 225 lb (102 kg)

Career information
- High school: Savanna (CA)
- College: Hawaii
- NFL draft: 1973: 16th round, 410th overall pick

Career history
- Dallas Cowboys (1973)*; Southern California Sun (1974)
- * Offseason or practice squad member only

John Conley (born October 22, 1950) is an American former professional football tight end in the World Football League (WFL) for the Southern California Sun. He played college football at the University of Hawaii.

== Early life ==
Conley attended Savanna High School. He enrolled at Fullerton Junior College, where he played for two seasons. He transferred to the University of California, Berkeley after his sophomore season. He transferred to the University of Hawaii before the start of his senior season.

== Professional career ==
Conley was selected by the Dallas Cowboys in the 16th round (410th overall) of the 1973 NFL draft. He was waived before the start of the season in August.

On July 21, 1974, he signed with the Southern California Sun of the World Football League, to replace a suspended Jacque MacKinnon at tight end. He was used mostly for blocking, before being released on August 8.
