= Cypress High School =

Public high school in California, United States

Location
- 9801 Valley View Street; Cypress, California 90630; United States; 33°49′13″N 118°1′44″W

Information
- School type: Public, High School
- Established: 1973
- School district: Anaheim Union HS District
- NCES District ID: 0602630
- Superintendent: Jaron Fried
- CEEB code: 050714
- NCES School ID: 060263000172
- Principal: Jennifer Brown
- Teaching staff: 100.04 (FTE)
- Grades: 9–12
- Gender: Coeducational
- Enrollment: 2,685 (2024–2025)
- Student to teacher ratio: 26.84
- Campus type: Large Suburban
- Colors: Navy Blue, Orange
- Fight song: Across the Field
- Athletics conference: Empire League
- Mascot: Roman Centurion
- Rival: Kennedy High School
- Accreditation: Western Association of Schools and Colleges
- USNWR ranking: 1566
- Newspaper: The Centurion Spotlight www.cyphype.com
- Yearbook: Cypress
- Feeder schools: Lexington Junior High
- Website: cypress.auhsd.us
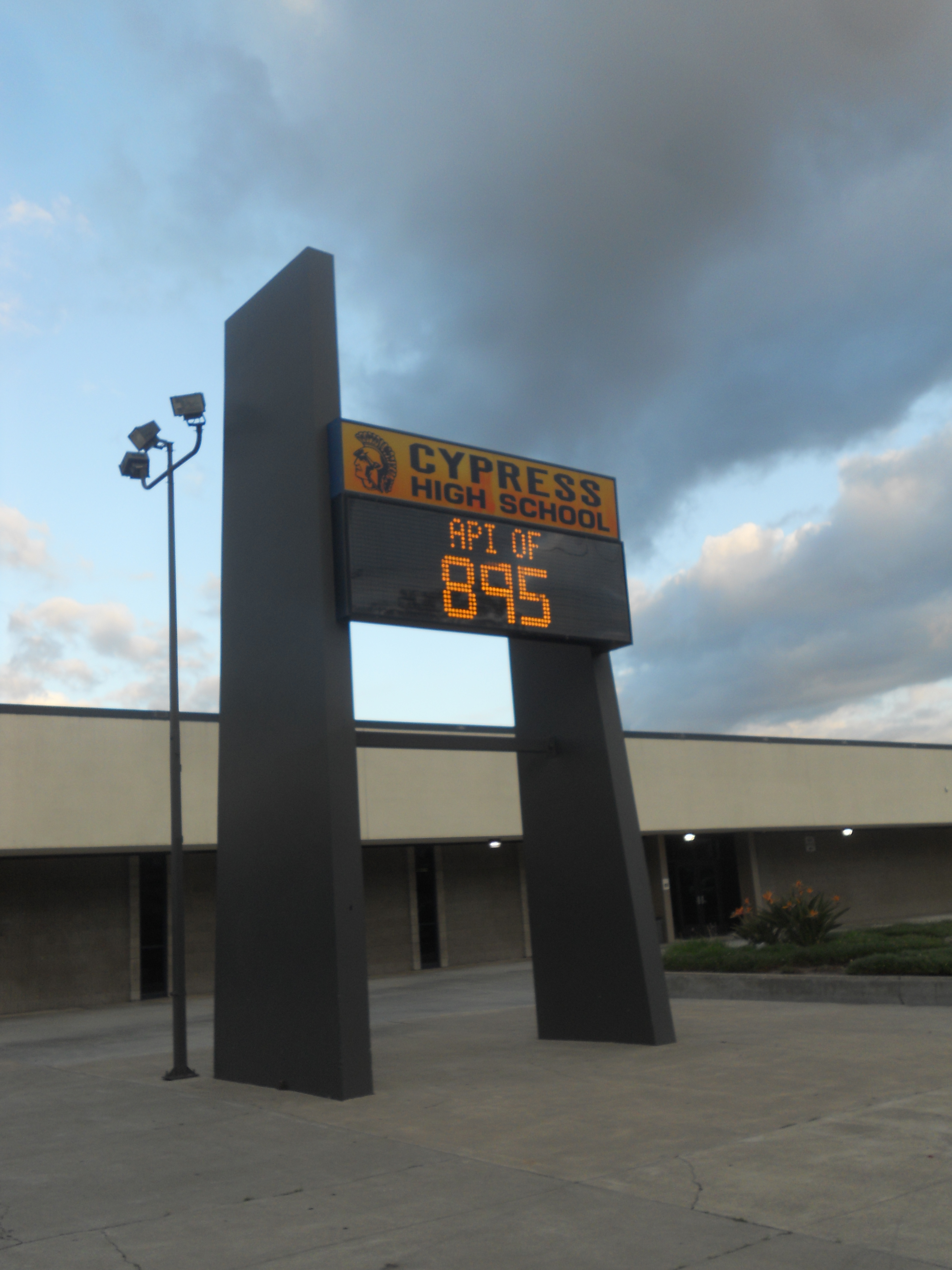
- The marquee in front of the school

Cypress High School is a public high school in the city of Cypress, California. It was founded in 1973 and serves grades 9 through 12. Cypress is one of eight high schools in the Anaheim Union High School District (AUHSD).

== History ==
Cypress was first established in 1973, and was honored as a California Distinguished School in 2007.

== Athletics ==
Cypress's sports teams compete in the Empire League and the CIF Southern Section. The school mascot is the centurion of Roman fame. The school colors are navy blue, orange, and white. In 2007, baseball team was ranked in the Top 25 for all prep teams nationwide.

=== CIF Southern Section championships ===
- Boys Golf 2005
- Baseball: 2005, 2013, 2019
- Football: 2007
- Softball: 1983, 1987, 1992, 2019
- Girls Volleyball: 2007, 2025 Schedules & Scores
- Boys Tennis 2016
- Boys Volleyball: 2017

=== CIF State Regional champions ===
- Girls Volleyball: 2025 Schedules & Scores

=== CIF State champions ===
- Girls Volleyball: 2025 California Interscholastic Federation

== Performing arts ==
The Cypress High School Centurion Imperial Brigade performed in the 2015 Rose Parade in Pasadena, California on New Year's Day. After the 2020 online season they changed their name to Sound In Motion.

Cypress currently has three competitive show choirs: the mixed-gender "High Voltage" and "Shockwaves" as well as the all-female "Pink Thunder". The program has fluctuated over the years from four show choirs to a singular 15-member group. The show choirs formerly hosted an annual competition entitled Star Reflections.

== Notable alumni ==
- Scott Aukerman, writer, actor, comedian, television personality, director, producer, and podcast host
- Marko Cavka, former professional American football offensive tackle
- Lanny Cordola, guitarist, songwriter, and producer
- Joel Crawford, film director
- Emily Dole, athlete, actress, and professional wrestler
- Christopher Dorner, former officer of the Los Angeles Police Department (LAPD) who committed a series of killings against the LAPD
- Jamil Douglas, former professional American football offensive guard
- Jarren Duran, current professional baseball outfielder for the Boston Red Sox
- David Fletcher, Infielder for the Los Angeles Angels
- Dominic Fletcher, 75th pick in the 2019 Major League Baseball draft by the Arizona Diamondbacks. He is the brother of Angels Infielder David Fletcher.
- Justin Lin, director & producer
- Clarence Moore, American football wide receiver who played in the National Football League for the Baltimore Ravens
- Scott Moore, professional baseball infielder for the Houston Astros of Major League Baseball
- Matt Ochoa, drummer for Dirty Heads
- Troy O'Leary, professional baseball outfielder who played with the Milwaukee Brewers, Boston Red Sox, Montreal Expos and Chicago Cubs
- Brian Tochi, actor, best known for role in Revenge of the Nerds
- Josh Vitters, third pick in the 2007 Major League Baseball draft (Chicago Cubs)
- Adrian Young, drummer for No Doubt
- Joe Son, former actor serving a sentence of life imprisonment
