= Marko Cavka =

American football player (born 1981)

No. 60, 73, 77
- Position: Offensive tackle

Personal information
- Born: April 4, 1981 (age 45); Cypress, California, U.S.
- Listed height: 6 ft 7 in (2.01 m)
- Listed weight: 294 lb (133 kg)

Career information
- High school: Cypress
- College: Sacramento State
- NFL draft: 2004: 6th round, 178th overall pick

Career history
- New York Jets (2004–2005); Amsterdam Admirals (2006); New York Jets (2006)*; Amsterdam Admirals (2007); New York Jets (2007)*; Hamilton Tiger-Cats (2007–2008)
- * Offseason or practice squad member only

Marko Cavka (born April 8, 1981) is a former professional American football offensive tackle. He was selected by the New York Jets in the sixth round of the 2004 NFL draft. He played college football at Sacramento State.

== Early life ==
Cavka attended Cypress High School in Cypress, California and was a student and a letterman in football and volleyball. In football, he was a three-year letterman, and as a senior, he was named the Empire League Lineman of the Year, was selected as All-California Interscholastic Federation defensive lineman, and was an All-Orange County selection. Marko Cavka graduated from Cypress High School in 1999.

== College career ==
Cavka attended California State University, Sacramento and was a student and a football letterman. In football, he started 42 consecutive games as an offensive lineman.

In 2010, Cavka was elected to the 2000–2010 CSU Sacramento Hornets Football All-Decade Team.

== Professional career ==
Cavka was selected by the New York Jets in the sixth round (178th overall) of the 2004 NFL draft.

Cavka played with the Amsterdam Admirals in NFL Europe in 2006 and 2007.

The Jets announced that they signed Marko Cavka to a contract on July 24, 2007, but was released on September 2 after sustaining an injury in the 5th preseason game.
