= Clarence Moore (American football) =

American football player (born 1982)

No. 84
- Position: Wide receiver

Personal information
- Born: September 24, 1982 (age 44); Bellflower, California, U.S.
- Listed height: 6 ft 6 in (1.98 m)
- Listed weight: 220 lb (100 kg)

Career information
- High school: Cypress (Cypress, California)
- College: Northern Arizona
- NFL draft: 2004: 6th round, 199th overall pick

Career history
- Baltimore Ravens (2004–2006); Edmonton Eskimos (2008)*
- * Offseason or practice squad member only

Career NFL statistics
- Receptions: 29
- Receiving yards: 353
- Receiving touchdowns: 5
- Stats at Pro Football Reference

Clarence Kelly Moore (born September 24, 1982) is an American former professional football player who was a wide receiver in the National Football League (NFL) for three seasons. He played college football for the Northern Arizona Lumberjacks.

== Early life ==
Moore attended Cypress High School in Cypress, California, and lettered in both football and track and field. In track, as a junior triple jump specialist, he won the League Championship and finished third at the State Finals.

== Professional career ==
He was selected by the Baltimore Ravens with the 34th pick, in the sixth round of the 2004 NFL draft out of Northern Arizona University. As a rookie, Moore appeared in 15 of 16 games with six starts, during which he recorded 24 receptions for 293 yards and four touchdowns. Moore was much less productive in his second season, only playing in four total games with one start with three receptions for 59 yards. His production was slightly better in 2006 with 10 games played with a single start. Moore had two receptions for one yard, that coming on a scoring pass from quarterback Steve McNair. Released prior to the start of the next season, Moore did not played professional football again.

== Personal life ==
He currently lives in Avondale, Arizona.
