= Empire League (California) =

The Empire League was a high school athletic league that was part of the CIF Southern Section. It served primarily large public schools in the Orange County, California area. After the 2023-2024 school year, the Empire League was merged with the Golden West league as part of a massive overhaul of the leagues of Orange County high school sports.

== Members ==
The teams ranging from the 2018–2019 season to the 2023-2024 season were:

- Crean Lutheran High School
- Cypress High School
- Kennedy High School
- Pacifica High School
- Tustin High School
- Valencia High School
