= Is the School House the Proper Place to Teach Raw Sex? =

American anti-sex-education pamphlet

Is the School House the Proper Place to Teach Raw Sex? is a 1968 pamphlet by Gordon V. Drake and published by Billy James Hargis's Christian Crusade. It was a key document in the conservative fight against sex education in public schools, a cultural issue that contributed to the development of the New Right.

The forty-page document, described by Time magazine as, "an angry little pamphlet", was originally distributed as part of a direct-mail fundraising campaign for the Christian Crusade, so that the organization could lobby against sex education in schools. It became a source of unfounded anecdotes about the supposed horrors of sex education for groups such as Mothers Organized for Moral Stability (MOMS).

School House targeted the Sexuality Information and Education Council of the United States (SIECUS), and in particular its director Dr. Mary Calderone. It described her as the "SIECUS Sexpot", and said that the group sought to "toss [...] God aside" and "to teach American youth a new sexual morality independent of church and state". Besides arguing that sex education undermined Christian morality and promoted promiscuity, the document said it is part of a "giant Communist conspiracy". It said: "[If] the new morality is affirmed, our children will become easy targets for Marxism and other amoral, nihilistic philosophies—as well as V.D.!" The pamphlet also identified the National Education Association as an enemy.

The pamphlet was the most widely circulated attack on sex education in the 1960s. Drake estimated that it sold over 90,000 copies in the three months after it was published, while Hargis claimed one million overall. A more conservative estimate is 250,000 copies.
