= Savanna High School =

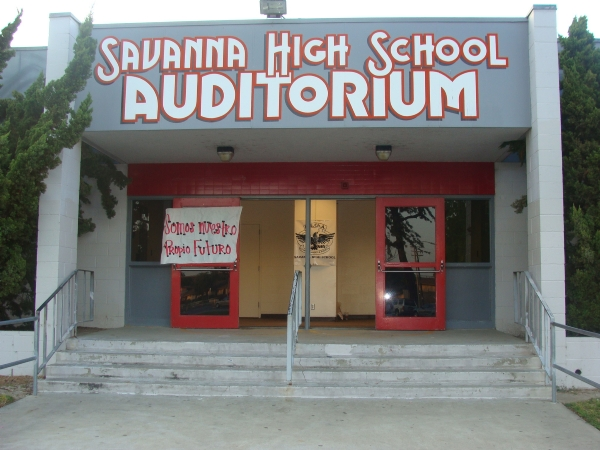

Location
- 301 North Gilbert Street; Anaheim, California 92801; United States; 33°50′6″N 117°58′5″W

Information
- Type: Public high school
- Established: 1961; 65 years ago
- School board: Anaheim Union High School District
- Superintendent: Michael B. Matsuda
- Principal: Michael Pooley
- Faculty: 80.94 (FTE)
- Grades: 9-12
- Enrollment: 1,711 (2022-23)
- Student to teacher ratio: 21.14
- Colors: Red & Gray
- Mascot: Rebel
- Nickname: Rebels
- Yearbook: Savannan
- Website: savanna.auhsd.us

Savanna High School (SHS) is a public high school in the Anaheim Union High School District (AUHSD), located in the city of Anaheim, California in the United States. Savanna was established in 1961 and is one of eight comprehensive high schools within the district. The school currently services the Northwest Anaheim region and southeast Buena Park.

== History ==
Savanna was the second of three new high schools opened in response to the city's rapid postwar growth, between Magnolia and Loara, all built by the Beckner Construction Company. The school was not completed until November 1961, and for the first quarter, students double-sessioned at Magnolia's campus. The school originally served grades 10 through 12, and did not enroll freshmen until 1980.

The students of the school voted in 1961 to adopt the "Rebels" as its nickname over the "Surfers." In 1964, a freelance artist named T. Howard Ball built a fiberglass statue representing the mascot "Johnny Rebel," a Confederate soldier appearing to charge at its enemy with a rifle. The statue stood in the quad until 2009, when it was removed due to its deterioration. An art teacher proposed restoring the statue in 2015, but the school board rejected the project unanimously, citing its racial insensitivity as well as the projected cost of $45,000.

In October 2017, in response to student and alumni objections to the mascot, the school held a nonbinding referendum of the student body on the future of the mascot and nickname. A majority of students voted to retain the nickname "Rebels" but to rebrand it to remove Confederate references and imagery. The school board agreed and voted in November to eliminate the Civil War references, including painting over an image of a Confederate soldier in the school gym and another mural which included a Confederate battle flag.

A memorial to alumnus Stephen Hillenburg was unveiled at the school in November 2021. Hillenburg was the creator of SpongeBob SquarePants, and was honored with a yellow bench and plaque donated by a committee including Hillenburg's wife, Karen. Much of the cast and crew from Spongebob attended the unveiling, including Tom Kenny, Bill Fagerbakke, and Clancy Brown.

== Notable alumni ==
- Don Aase, professional baseball pitcher.
- Marty Castillo, professional baseball player.
- John Conley, professional football tight end.
- Steve DeBerg, professional football quarterback.
- Stephen Hillenburg, creator of SpongeBob SquarePants.
- Glenn Hoffman, professional baseball infielder and coach.
- Trevor Hoffman, professional baseball pitcher.
- Al Hrabosky, professional baseball pitcher.
- Greg Mathews, professional baseball pitcher.
- Bernice Orwig, water polo player who won silver medal at the 2000 Summer Olympics.
- Rick Ownbey, professional baseball pitcher.
