= Magnolia High School (California) =

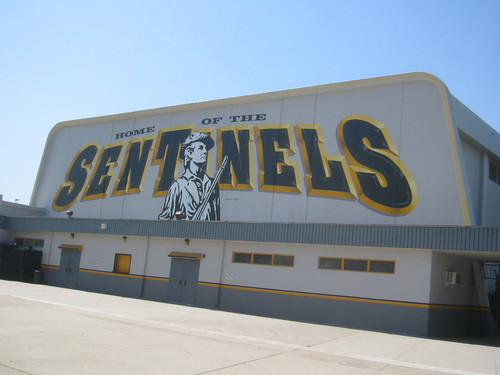

Location
- 2450 W Ball Rd; Anaheim, California 92804; United States; 33°48′58″N 117°58′18″W

Information
- Type: Public
- Motto: Magnolia Does It Better
- Established: 1961
- Principal: Michael Pooley
- Teaching staff: 79.09 (FTE)
- Grades: 9-12
- Enrollment: 1,5662 (2023-2024)
- Student to teacher ratio: 21.01
- Colors: Black and gold
- Nickname: Sentinels
- Yearbook: The Cannon
- Website: magnolia.auhsd.us//

Magnolia High School is a public high school in Anaheim, California, located in the Southwest Anaheim region. It is part of the Anaheim Union High School District. The school is named after the nearest major street to the west.

== Demographics ==
The demographic breakdown of 1,815 students enrolled for 2012-2012 was:

- Male - 51.7%
- Female - 48.3%
- Native American/Alaskan - 0.1%
- Asian/Pacific islanders - 15%
- Black - 2.5%
- Hispanic - 72.1%
- White - 9%
- Multiracial - 0.5%

77.1% of the students qualified for free or reduced lunch.

== Notable alumni ==
- Hank Bauer, football player
- Bill Bensley, architect, Architectural Digest top 100
- James Blaylock, science fiction writer
- Tony Cadena, aka Anthony Brandenburg, lead singer for The Adolescents
- Brian Downing, former major league baseball designated hitter, outfielder, and catcher
- Pat Martin, broadcaster at KMET Los Angeles, KGB San Diego, and KRXQ Sacramento
- Michael Orozco, soccer player
- Mike and Jerry Quarry, professional boxers
- Bill Schmidt, baseball executive
