= John F. Kennedy High School (La Palma, California) =

Public high school in California, United States

Location
- 8281 Walker Street; Southern California; La Palma, Orange County, California 90623; United States; 33°50′33″N 118°2′14″W

Information
- School type: Public, High School
- Established: 1964
- Status: Operational
- School district: Anaheim Union HS District
- NCES District ID: 0602630
- Superintendent: Jaron Fried
- CEEB code: 050379
- NCES School ID: 060263000177
- Principal: Poppy Hill-Bonales
- Teaching staff: 84.25 (FTE)
- Grades: 9th-12th
- Gender: Coeducational
- Enrollment: 2,024 (2023-2024)
- Student to teacher ratio: 24.02
- Campus type: Large Suburb
- Colors: Kelly Green & Gold
- Fight song: Notre Dame Victory March
- Athletics conference: Empire League CIF Southern Section
- Sports: Football
- Mascot: Fighting Irish
- Rival: Cypress High School
- Accreditation: Western Association of Schools and Colleges
- Newspaper: The Shamrock
- Yearbook: Eternal Flame
- Feeder schools: Walker Junior High
- Website: kennedy.auhsd.us

John F. Kennedy High School is a public, four-year high school and International Baccalaureate (IB) World School in the city of La Palma, California. Kennedy gets most of its students from the junior high school across the street, Walker Junior High School.

== History ==
John F. Kennedy High School opened with 1,488 students in the 10th and 11th grades on September 14, 1964. For its first year of operation, there was no senior class. Kenneth MacPherson was Kennedy's first principal. Most buildings were ready except for the dressing rooms, the gym, and playing fields. The school was to be named Centralia, in keeping with the Board's policy of naming high schools after an elementary school district in the area; however, the assassination of John F. Kennedy in 1963 prompted a group of patrons to have the school (then under construction) renamed in his honor.

In the fall of 2011, the administration of Kennedy High School was criticized for its "Gold Card Program," in which students who performed well on the California Standardized Tests from the previous year were given special recognition through planners and ID cards, along with perks and bonuses at local businesses and throughout the school. Nearby Cypress High School had also implemented a similar program, but it did not receive as much media attention. Both schools have since removed or altered the program.

Currently, Kennedy serves around 2,400 students in the 9th through 12th grades. Recent construction has added a quad area, a second practice gym, renovated classrooms, a new library and counseling center, a modular "4th court," and an extensive music building, which includes an auditorium, two band rooms, two choir rooms, practice rooms, and a new pool.

== Sports ==
Kennedy's sports teams are known as the Fighting Irish (with the senior circle resembling a three-leaf clover when viewed from above). They are members of the Empire League in CIF's Southern Section. The school's main rival is Cypress High School. The Fighting Irish football team won the CIF-SS Southern Division Championship in 2006, adding to the AAA championship they won in 1971. In 2017, the boys volleyball team captured their first CIF-SS Div IV championship in program history. It marked the first time in CIF Southern Section history a wild card team successfully captured the CIF title.

=== Complete list of Kennedy team CIF SS Championships ===
- 1971 - Football - Div. 3A CIF Champion
- 1980 - Boys Soccer - Div. 3A CIF Champion
- 1984 - Girls Softball - Div. 4A CIF Champion
- 1988 - Girls Softball - Div. 3A CIF Champion
- 1988 - Boys Basketball - Div. 3A CIF Champion
- 1989 - Boys Baseball - Div. 3A CIF Champion
- 2003 - Boys Soccer - Div. 3 CIF Champion
- 2004 - Boys Soccer - Div. 3 CIF Champion
- 2006 - Football - CIF Southern Division Champion
- 2017 - Boys Volleyball - Div. 4 CIF Champion
- 2019 - Boys Baseball - Div. 4 CIF Champion
- 2025 - Boys Tennis - Div. 6 CIF Champion
- 2025 - Boys Volleyball - Div. 5 CIF Champion
- 2026 - Girls Basketball - Div. 7 CIF Champion

== Performing Arts ==
=== Band and Color Guard ===
The John F. Kennedy High School's marching band and color guard are known as the "Shamrock Regiment," which gave their first Ireland performance in the 1974 Saint Patrick's Day parade in Dublin, continuing to perform in Dublin every four years, and celebrated their 50th-Anniversary trip in 2024. In 2000, the marching band, along with two other Orange County high schools, was invited to perform the 2000 Summer Olympics opening ceremony in Sydney, Australia. The Shamrock Regiment has close connections with the Green Band Association from Japan, often providing their auditorium for the band's concerts.

=== Theatre ===
The high school's theatre program was re-established in 2021 and is known as "The Blarney Stone Theatre".

== Notable alumni ==
- Casey Fien, Major League Baseball pitcher in the Seattle Mariners' Organization
- John Stamos, actor

== See also ==
- List of memorials to John F. Kennedy
