= Cypress School District =

School district in California, United States

Address
- 5816 Corporate Avenue Cypress, California, 90630; United States

District information
- Type: Public
- Grades: K–6
- NCES District ID: 0610440

Students and staff
- Students: 3,540 (2020–2021)
- Teachers: 142.28 (FTE)
- Staff: 183.37 (FTE)
- Student–teacher ratio: 24.88:1

Other information
- Website: www.cypsd.org

Cypress Elementary School District is a public school district in Orange County, California.

The district includes the vast majority of Cypress, as well as portions of Buena Park, La Palma, and Los Alamitos.

== Schools ==
All of these elementary schools are in Cypress except Luther, which is in La Palma.

- A.E. Arnold Elementary School
- Clara J. King Elementary School
- Margaret Landell Elementary School
- Steve Luther Elementary School
- Juliet Morris Elementary School
- Frank Vessels Elementary School

There is also a preschool, located on the King property.
