= Savanna School District =

School district in California

Address
- 1330 South Knott Avenue Anaheim, California, 92804; United States

District information
- Type: Public
- Grades: K–6
- NCES District ID: 0636030

Students and staff
- Students: 1,949 (2020–2021)
- Teachers: 80.5 (on an FTE basis)
- Staff: 81.7 (on an FTE basis)
- Student–teacher ratio: 24.21:1

Other information
- Website: www.savsd.org

Savanna School District is an elementary school district in Anaheim, California that also serves a small portion of Buena Park, Cypress and Stanton. The district has four schools, Cerritos Elementary, Hansen Elementary, Holder Elementary and Twila Reid Elementary. All schools are K-6. The district feeds into the Anaheim Union High School District. The district's name is a survival from the former town of Savanna, California.
