= Magnolia School District (California) =

School district in California, United States

Location
- 2705 West Orange Ave. Anaheim, California 92804 Orange County, California United States

District information
- Motto: To inspire ALL students to extraordinary achievement every day.
- Grades: PreK through 6th
- Established: 1895
- Superintendent: Dr. Frank Donavan
- Budget: $157.4 million (2025-2026)

Students and staff
- Students: 5,887
- Teachers: 256
- Staff: 751
- Student–teacher ratio: 24:1

Other information
- Website: www.magnoliasd.org

Magnolia School District is a public elementary school district in Orange County, California, United States, headquartered in Anaheim. Magnolia School District provides students with an education intended to build a foundation to prepare them for college and careers in the 21st century. All students are provided with rigorous standards-based instruction, one-to-one technology in grades K through six, and specially designed music and arts programs. Seven of the nine Magnolia Elementary Schools received the California Gold Ribbon Schools Award and the Title I Academic Achieving Schools Award in 2016, and one school received the Exemplary Arts Education Program Award. The district feeds into the Anaheim Union High School District. In 2024, one school won third place in the NCUST America's Best School Awards.

== Schools ==
It includes the following schools:

- Dr. Albert Schweitzer Leadership Academy
- Dr. Jonas Salk
- Dr. Peter Marshall
- Esther L. Walter
- Juliette Low School of the Arts
- Lord Baden-Powell
- Mattie Lou Maxwell
- Robert M. Pyles STEM Academy
- Walt Disney

== Embezzlement case ==
A serious embezzlement offense was committed against the Magnolia School District by Jorge Armando Contreras, a former senior director of fiscal services who oversaw the district's finances since 2006. Over a seven-year period, from July 2013 to July 2016, Contreras embezzled around $16.7 million from the school district. He wrote checks totaling from $11,000 to $95,000, making over 250 illicit payments to himself. The checks were written under a false name, but the money was placed into his personal bank account. He would use spaced-out letters and "M S D," the initials of the Magnolia School District, on checks for modest sums. He would increase the check amounts and deposit them into his account after getting the required signatures. Contreras funded his extravagant lifestyle with the proceeds of the theft, which included a $1.5 million Yorba Linda home, a $127,000 BMW from 2021, 57 opulent designer handbags (mainly Louis Vuitton), and $190,000 in cosmetic surgery.

Contreras pleaded guilty to one count of embezzlement, theft, and intentional misapplication of funds from an organization receiving federal funds. He was sentenced to 70 months (nearly six years) in federal prison and ordered to pay $16,694,942 in restitution. Law enforcement seized approximately $7.7 million in personal and real property traced to his fraud.
