= Mothers Organized for Moral Stability =

Mothers Organized for Moral Stability, also known as MOMS, was a socially conservative American organization that arose in Orange County, California in the 1960s and whose primary goal was to counter the cultural trend at the time towards allowing sexual education and techniques for birth control to be taught in public schools. It was one of a number of such acronym-based conservative American organizations focused on sex education.

== History ==
MOMS was largely an organized reaction by conservative residents of the county to the Anaheim Union High School District (AUHSD)'s family life and sex education course. The school district had implemented a sex education course in 1965 with little resistance. Three years later, in 1968, a homemaker named Eleanor Howe, whose son was enrolled at one of the district's schools, got wind of the curriculum and began organizing a network of like-minded mothers to confront the school board. The members of this group flocked to a meeting of the school board and quoted material from a pamphlet, Is the Schoolhouse the Proper Place to Teach Raw Sex?, which had recently been published by Billy James Hargis's Christian Crusade and demanded that the course be halted immediately. They also stated their firm belief, based on the film Pavlov's Children produced by members of the political Radical Right who saw the US as locked in conflict between Christian-based traditional values and Communist subversive "new" values, that the course was the result of a Soviet communist conspiracy orchestrated through the United Nations to make American youth amenable to totalitarian dictatorship. Within a year they had replaced the elected members of the board with their political allies, and the sex education program at AUHSD was dispensed with.
