= Cypress, California =

City in California, United States

- City
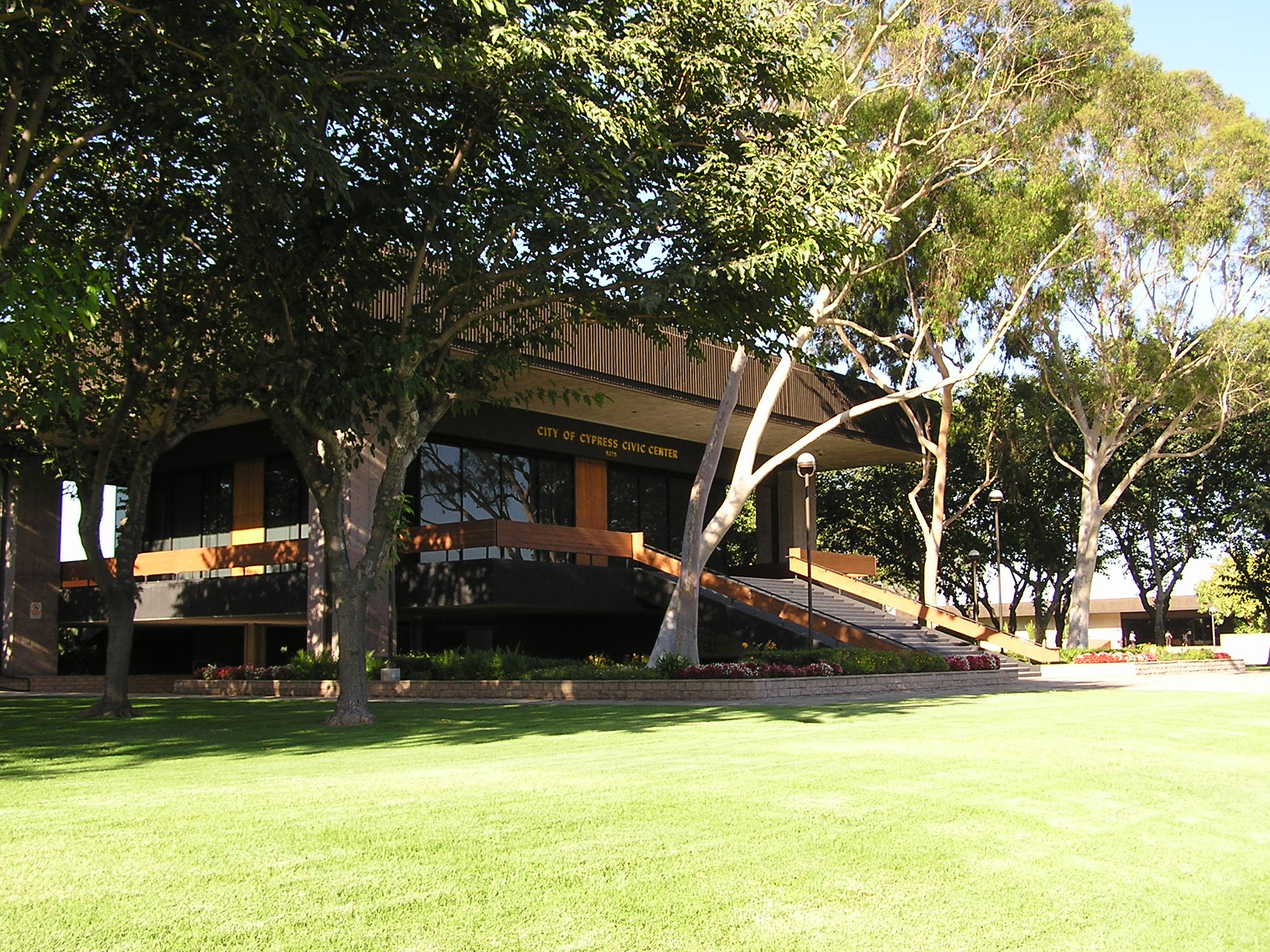
- Cypress City Council Chamber, originally designed by William L. Pereira and Associates

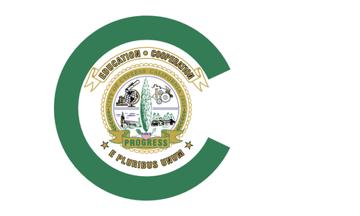
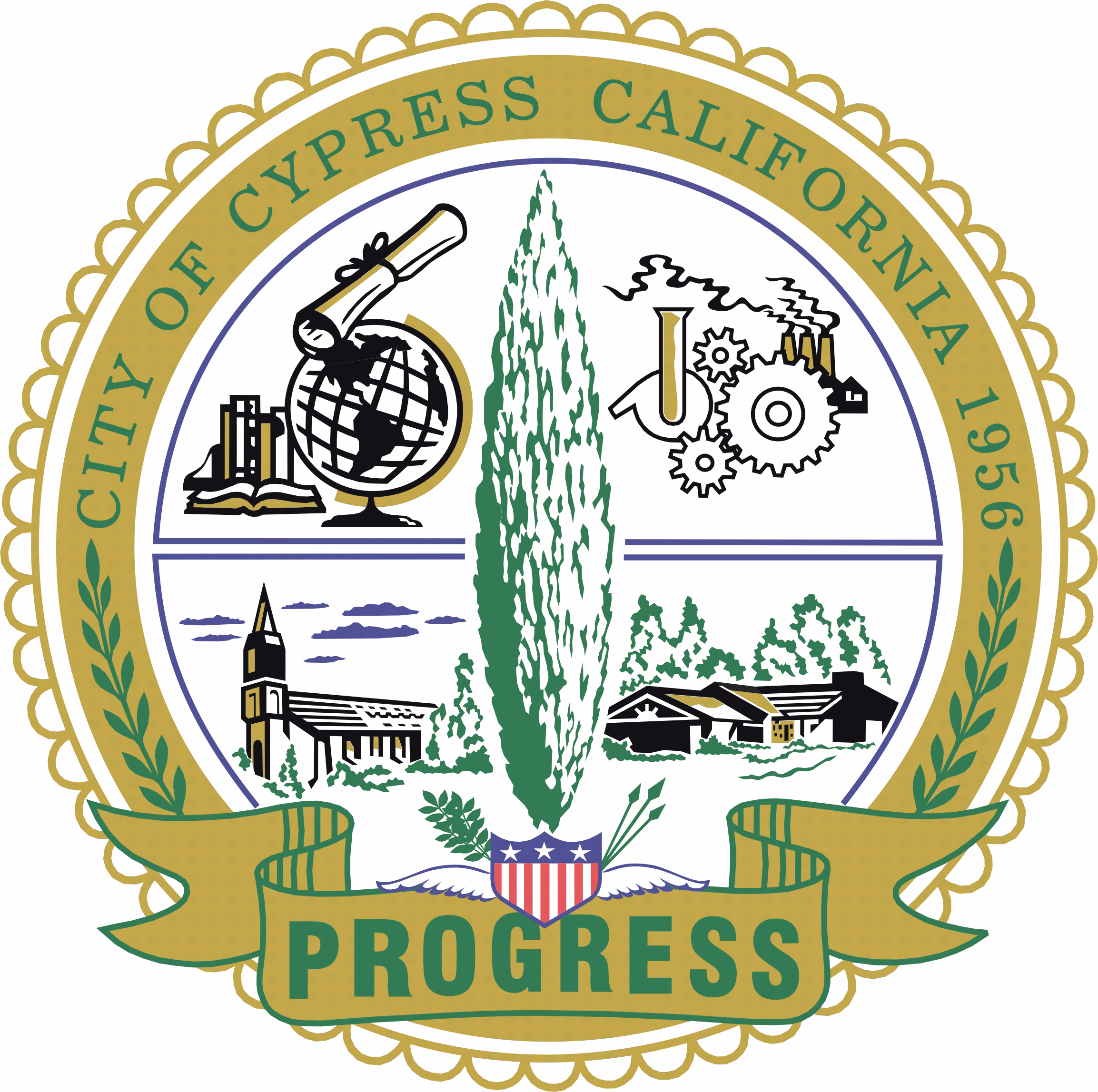
- Flag Seal
- Interactive map of Cypress, California
- Location in the United States
- Coordinates: 33°49′6″N 118°2′21″W
- Country: United States
- State: California
- County: Orange
- Incorporated: July 24, 1956

Government
  - Type: Council-Manager
  - Mayor: Leo Medrano
  - Mayor Pro Tem: Kyle Chang
  - City council: David Burke; Bonnie Peat; Rachel Strong Carnahan
  - City Manager: Shannon DeLong

Area
  - Total: 6.62 sq mi (17.15 km^{2})
  - Land: 6.61 sq mi (17.13 km^{2})
  - Water: 0.0077 sq mi (0.02 km^{2}) 0.14%
- Elevation: 39 ft (12 m)

Population (2020)
  - Total: 50,151
  - Density: 7,583.5/sq mi (2,927.99/km^{2})
- Time zone: UTC−8 (Pacific)
  - Summer (DST): UTC−7 (PDT)
- ZIP code: 90630
- Area codes: 562, 657/714
- FIPS code: 06-17750
- GNIS feature IDs: 1652696, 2410282
- Website: www.cypressca.org

Cypress is a city in northwestern Orange County, California. Its population was 50,151 as of the 2020 census.

== History ==
Cypress originally was nicknamed "Waterville" due to the preponderance of artesian wells in the area, but was incorporated under the name Dairy City in 1956 by local dairy farmers as a means of staving off developers and to preserve their dairies, much like the then-neighboring cities of Dairy Valley in Cerritos and Dairyland in La Palma. After World War II, however, the land became too valuable for farming or ranching, and the dairies gradually sold out to housing developers during the 1960s, so that by the 1970s no dairies remained. Many of the dairymen moved their operations to Chino, where development is once again pushing them out of the area.

In 1957, local residents voted to change the name of "Dairy City" to "Cypress". The name was taken from Cypress Elementary School (originally built in 1895) which took its name from the cypress trees planted to protect the schoolhouse from the seasonal Santa Ana winds. Cypress Elementary School also provided the name for new Pacific Electric Railway station on Walker Street at Lincoln Avenue when the Santa Ana Line was completed in 1906, as "Waterville" already had been used elsewhere in the system.

In 1981, the City of Cypress inaugurated an annual birthday celebration for the city. The event, the Cypress Community Festival, currently may be the largest single-day event of its kind in Orange County, California. The Cypress Community Festival is held annually on the 4th Saturday in July at Oak Knoll Park, located adjacent to the Cypress Community Center at 5700 Orange Avenue, between Valley View Street and Walker Avenue.

== Geography ==
According to the United States Census Bureau, the city has a total area of 6.6 square miles (17.1 km^{2}). 6.6 square miles (17.0 km^{2}) of it is land and 0.14% is water.

== Demographics ==
Historical population
| Census | Pop. | Note | %± |
|---|---|---|---|
| 1960 | 1,753 | | — |
| 1970 | 31,569 | | 1,700.9% |
| 1980 | 40,738 | | 29.0% |
| 1990 | 42,655 | | 4.7% |
| 2000 | 46,229 | | 8.4% |
| 2010 | 47,802 | | 3.4% |
| 2020 | 50,151 | | 4.9% |
| 2023 (est.) | 48,782 | ▼ | −2.7% |
U.S. Decennial Census; 1860–1870 1880–1890; 1900 1910 1920; 1930 1940 1950; 1960 1970 1980; 1990 2000 2010; 2020

Cypress first appeared as a city in the 1960 U.S. census as part of the Buena Park-Cypress census county division.

=== Racial and ethnic composition ===
Cypress city, California – Racial and ethnic composition Note: the US Census treats Hispanic/Latino as an ethnic category. This table excludes Latinos from the racial categories and assigns them to a separate category. Hispanics/Latinos may be of any race.
| Race / Ethnicity (NH = Non-Hispanic) | Pop 1980 | Pop 1990 | Pop 2000 | Pop 2010 | Pop 2020 | % 1980 | % 1990 | % 2000 | % 2010 | % 2020 |
|---|---|---|---|---|---|---|---|---|---|---|
| White alone (NH) | 32,534 | 30,198 | 26,400 | 20,865 | 16,356 | 80.55% | 70.80% | 57.11% | 43.65% | 32.61% |
| Black or African American alone (NH) | 365 | 806 | 1,251 | 1,376 | 1,522 | 0.90% | 1.89% | 2.71% | 2.88% | 3.03% |
| Native American or Alaska Native alone (NH) | 187 | 190 | 176 | 142 | 85 | 0.46% | 0.45% | 0.38% | 0.30% | 0.17% |
| Asian alone (NH) | 2,864 | 5,643 | 9,564 | 14,850 | 18,743 | 7.09% | 13.23% | 20.69% | 31.07% | 37.37% |
| Native Hawaiian or Pacific Islander alone (NH) | 2,864 | 5,643 | 164 | 204 | 251 | 7.09% | 13.23% | 0.35% | 0.43% | 0.50% |
| Other race alone (NH) | 57 | 53 | 112 | 87 | 203 | 0.14% | 0.12% | 0.24% | 0.18% | 0.40% |
| Mixed race or Multiracial (NH) | x | x | 1,327 | 1,499 | 2,302 | x | x | 2.87% | 3.14% | 4.59% |
| Hispanic or Latino (any race) | 4,384 | 5,765 | 7,235 | 8,779 | 10,689 | 10.85% | 13.52% | 15.65% | 18.37% | 21.31% |
| Total | 40,391 | 42,655 | 46,229 | 47,802 | 50,151 | 100.00% | 100.00% | 100.00% | 100.00% | 100.00% |

=== 2023 estimate ===
As of 2023, the Census Bureau QuickFacts estimates the population of Cypress to be at 49,243. Cypress is a fairly diverse city. Asian Americans make up 37.1% of the population. White alone, not Hispanic or Latino, make up 33.5%. Hispanic or Latino make up 20.4% of the population. Those who identify as two or more races make up 10.6% of the population. Black or African Americans make up 3.4%. Foreign born residents make up 29.9% of the population.

=== 2020 census ===
As of the 2020 census, Cypress had a population of 50,151. The median age was 41.5 years. 21.4% of residents were under the age of 18 and 16.7% of residents were 65 years of age or older. For every 100 females there were 92.1 males, and for every 100 females age 18 and over there were 90.1 males age 18 and over.

100.0% of residents lived in urban areas, while 0.0% lived in rural areas.

There were 16,490 households in Cypress, of which 37.4% had children under the age of 18 living in them. Of all households, 60.4% were married-couple households, 11.7% were households with a male householder and no spouse or partner present, and 23.8% were households with a female householder and no spouse or partner present. About 15.2% of all households were made up of individuals and 8.1% had someone living alone who was 65 years of age or older.

There were 16,855 housing units, of which 2.2% were vacant. The homeowner vacancy rate was 0.5% and the rental vacancy rate was 2.8%.

=== 2010 census ===
At the 2010 census Cypress had a population of 47,802. The population density was 7,253.4 inhabitants per square mile (2,800.6/km^{2}). The racial makeup of Cypress was 26,000 (54.4%) White (43.6% Non-Hispanic White), 1,444 (3.0%) African American, 289 (0.6%) Native American, 14,978 (31.3%) Asian, 234 (0.5%) Pacific Islander, 2,497 (5.2%) from other races, and 2,360 (4.9%) from two or more races. Hispanic or Latino of any race were 8,779 persons (18.4%).

The census reported that 47,300 people (98.9% of the population) lived in households, 502 (1.1%) lived in non-institutionalized group quarters, and no one was institutionalized.

There were 15,654 households, 6,481 (41.4%) had children under the age of 18 living in them, 9,602 (61.3%) were opposite-sex married couples living together, 2,203 (14.1%) had a female householder with no husband present, 833 (5.3%) had a male householder with no wife present. There were 506 (3.2%) unmarried opposite-sex partnerships, and 86 (0.5%) same-sex married couples or partnerships. 2,401 households (15.3%) were one person and 1,005 (6.4%) had someone living alone who was 65 or older. The average household size was 3.02. There were 12,638 families (80.7% of households); the average family size was 3.35.

The age distribution was 11,343 people (23.7%) under the age of 18, 4,700 people (9.8%) aged 18 to 24, 11,685 people (24.4%) aged 25 to 44, 13,913 people (29.1%) aged 45 to 64, and 6,161 people (12.9%) who were 65 or older. The median age was 39.9 years. For every 100 females, there were 94.2 males. For every 100 females age 18 and over, there were 90.3 males.

There were 16,068 housing units at an average density of 2,438.1 per square mile, of the occupied units 10,960 (70.0%) were owner-occupied and 4,694 (30.0%) were rented. The homeowner vacancy rate was 0.9%; the rental vacancy rate was 3.5%. 32,780 people (68.6% of the population) lived in owner-occupied housing units and 14,520 people (30.4%) lived in rental housing units.

According to the 2010 United States Census, Cypress had a median household income of $80,440, with 6.7% of the population living below the federal poverty line.

=== 2000 census ===
At the 2000 census there were 46,229 people in 15,654 households, including 12,241 families, in the city. The population density was 6,991.1 inhabitants per square mile (2,699.3/km^{2}). There were 16,028 housing units at an average density of 2,423.9 per square mile (935.9/km^{2}). The racial makeup of the city was 65.61% White, 20.81% Asian, 0.40% Pacific Islander, 2.77% Black or African American, 0.59% Native American, 5.44% from other races, and 4.38% from two or more races. 15.65% of the population were Hispanic or Latino. Of the 15,654 households 38.8% had children under the age of 18 living with them, 60.0% were married couples living together, 13.3% had a female householder with no husband present, and 21.8% were non-families. 17.6% of households were one person and 6.6% were one person aged 65 or older. The average household size was 2.93 and the average family size was 3.31.

The age distribution was 27.0% under the age of 18, 7.9% from 18 to 24, 30.2% from 25 to 44, 24.4% from 45 to 64, and 10.6% 65 or older. The median age was 37 years. For every 100 females, there were 94.9 males. For every 100 females age 18 and over, there were 90.5 males.

The median household income was $64,377 and the median family income was $70,060 (these figures had risen to $80,331 and $86,286 respectively as of a 2007 estimate). Males had a median income of $50,781 versus $36,337 for females. The per capita income for the city was $25,798. About 4.6% of families and 6.0% of the population were below the poverty line, including 7.2% of those under age 18 and 5.1% of those age 65 or over.

== Economy ==
Real Mex Restaurants is headquartered in Cypress. The Los Alamitos Race Course is located in Cypress, even though it bears the name of its neighboring city of Los Alamitos.

=== Top employers ===
As of 2018, the top employers in the city are:

| # | Employer | # of employees |
|---|---|---|
| 1 | UnitedHealth Group | 1,998 |
| 2 | Siemens | 668 |
| 3 | Cypress College | 602 |
| 4 | Hybrid Promotions | 407 |
| 5 | C & D Zodiac | 359 |
| 6 | Yamaha Motor Company | 350 |
| 7 | Primary Color Systems | 330 |
| 8 | Los Alamitos Race Course | 315 |
| 9 | Trident University | 254 |
| 10 | Costco | 250 |

== Government ==
The city uses plurality block voting to elect two sets of city councilmembers (in staggered terms). The city council has received a letter written by attorney Kevin Shenkman that claims existence of racially-polarized voting within the city, which combines with this election system to result in a violation of the California Voting Rights Act. The city council held forums for public input on how to respond. The council reached a decision during the March 14, 2022, council meeting's closed session to have the city attorney send a response letter. This letter disagrees with the claims and asks for more evidence.

In the California State Legislature, Cypress is in the 36th senatorial district, represented by Republican Tony Strickland, and in the 67th Assembly district, represented by Democrat Sharon Quirk-Silva.

In the United States House of Representatives, Cypress is in California's 45th congressional district, represented by Democrat Derek Tran.

According to the California Secretary of State, as of October 19, 2020, Cypress has 30,207 registered voters. Of those, 11,029 (36.51%) are registered Democrats, 10,226 (33.85%) are registered Republicans, and 7,514 (24.88%) have declined to state a political party/are independents.

== Education ==
Schools inside the Cypress city limits belong to the Anaheim Union High School District and the Cypress Elementary School District. However, some Cypress students are part of the attendance areas for the Savanna Elementary School District, Garden Grove Unified School District, and Los Alamitos Unified School District.

Public schools within Cypress:

- Cypress High School
- Lexington Junior High
- Oxford Academy
- Christine P. Swain Elementary
- Margaret Landell Elementary
- A.E. Arnold Elementary
- Juliet Morris Elementary
- Frank Vessels Elementary
- Robert C. Cawthon Elementary
- Clara J. King Elementary
- Steve Luther Elementary

Private schools:

- St Irenaeus Parish School

Cypress College is located in the city.

== Notable people ==
- Scott Aukerman - comedian and broadcaster
- Michael Blatchford - professional track cyclist
- Paul B. Carpenter - psychologist and politician
- Marko Cavka - professional American football tackle
- Nadine Conner - operatic soprano
- Sofie Dossi - YouTuber and contortionist
- Jamil Douglas- National Football League player
- David Fletcher - Major League Baseball player
- Dominic Fletcher - Major League Baseball player
- Amanda Freed - professional softball player
- Amy Fruhwirth - professional golfer
- Brandon Laird - professional baseball player
- Steven Lee - music producer
- John Moorlach - politician
- Clarence Moore - professional American football player
- Matthew Morrison - entertainer
- Troy O'Leary - Major League Baseball player
- Angela Park - professional golfer
- Quinten Pounds - professional American football wide receiver
- Jerry Quarry - professional boxer
- Shannel - drag queen
- Linda Sharp - women’s basketball coach
- John Stamos - actor and musician
- Brian Tochi - actor
- Justine Wong-Orantes - volleyball player and two-time Olympic medalist
- Tiger Woods - professional golfer
- Jeff Wulbrun - basketball coach
- Adrian Young - drummer of rock band No Doubt
