= Sex education in the United States =

Aspect of American education

In the United States, sex education is taught in two main forms: comprehensive sex education and abstinence-only as part of the Adolescent Family Life Act, or AFLA. Comprehensive sex education is also called abstinence-based, abstinence-plus, abstinence-plus-risk-reduction, and sexual risk reduction sex education. This approach covers abstinence as a choice option, but also informs adolescents about age of consent and the availability of contraception and techniques to avoid contraction of sexually transmitted infections. Every state within the U.S. has a mandated AIDS Education Program.

Abstinence-only sex education is also called abstinence-centered, abstinence-only-until-marriage, sexual risk avoidance, chastity program, and most recently, youth empowerment sex education. This approach emphasizes abstinence from sexual activity prior to marriage and rejects methods such as contraception. These two approaches are very different in philosophy and strategies for educating young people about their sexuality. The difference between the two approaches, and their impact on the behavior of adolescents, remains a controversial subject in the United States.

== History ==
Sex education in the United States was not widespread until the 1950s. Before 1900, any sex education in public schools was minimal, and the push for including sex education gained momentum only after World War I, inspired by the spread of sexually transmitted infections (STIs) in soldiers. In 1918, the Chamberlain-Kahn Act was passed, which mandated STI prevention education in soldiers. In 1919, the US Department of Labor's Children's Bureau published a report suggesting that sex education in schools could better prepare the US military's soldiers in the future. From the 1920s to the 1950s there was a series of incremental steps to include sex education in public schools, framed largely as a hygiene issue, with the US Office of Education publishing the first sex education material to train teachers in the 1930s.

During the 1960s, sex education in public school became a point of political tension, with various conservative groups and individuals such as the John Birch Society, Reverend Billy James Hargis of the Christian Crusade, and Liberty Lobby protesting against the practice. Arguments included the beliefs that children would be taught "raw sex", learn about homosexuality, and increase risk-taking behavior in teens. Pamphlets such as Is the School House the Proper Place to Teach Raw Sex? were widely distributed and linked sex education with communism, Marxism, humanism, and globalist plots. In 1964, the Sexual Information and Education Council of the US (SIECUS) was founded, advocating for sex education in schools as an important part of general civil education.

In 1981, the Adolescent Family Life Act was passed, which made way for abstinence-only education.

== Current position ==
List of "19 Critical Sexual Education Topics" published by the US Centers for Disease Control and Prevention in 2016

Sex education programs in the United States teach students about sexual health as well as ways to avoid sexually transmitted diseases and unwanted teenage pregnancy. The three main types of programs are abstinence-only, abstinence-plus, and comprehensive sex education. Although sex education programs that only promote abstinence are very prominent in American public schools, comprehensive sex education is known to be the most effective and is proven to have helped young people make better decisions. Sex education has many benefits as it educates students about the human anatomy and teaches the importance of having healthy relationships. Adequate sex education programs in public schools greatly benefit students and have the potential to reduce the high percentages of sexually transmitted diseases and unwanted pregnancies in America.

Most adolescents in the United States receive some form of sex education at school at least once between grades 6 and 12; many schools begin addressing some topics as early as grades 4 or 5. Academic and other proponents of the National Sexuality Education Standards advocate that by the end of the fifth grade, students should be able to "Define sexual orientation as the romantic attraction of an individual to someone of the same gender or a different gender." However, what students learn varies widely, because curriculum decisions are so decentralized. Many states have laws governing what is taught in sex education classes or allowing parents to opt out. Some state laws leave curriculum decisions to individual school districts.

National public health goals for adolescents recommend providing a comprehensive sex education, which covers a wide array of topics and call for "increasing the share of adolescents receiving formal instruction about abstinence, birth control methods, and prevention of HIV/AIDS and STIs." Despite the aims national public health goals, research has indicated a growing gap between them and adolescents receipt of sex education. Data from the National Survey of Family Growth, a nationally representative household survey conducted by the National Center for Health Statistics, asked respondents if prior to age 18 they had ever received "any formal instruction at a school, church, a community center or some other place" about a range of sex education topics. During the period 2011–2013, data from the NSFG showed that among adolescents aged 15–19, similar proportions of females and males reported receiving formal instruction, with the share receiving instruction about birth control methods (60% females, 55% males) lower than the share receiving instruction about saying no to sex, sexually transmitted diseases, or HIV/AIDS. Many sexually experienced teens (43% females and 57% of males) do not receive formal instruction about contraception before they first have sex; the share of adolescents receiving formal instruction has been declining. Between 2006-2010 and 2011–2013, there were declines in the proportion of females ages 15–19 who reported receiving instruction on birth control, saying no to sex, HIV/AIDS and sexually transmitted diseases, as well as a decline in the proportion of males who reported receiving formal instruction about birth control. Both males and females reported an increase in receiving instruction on saying no to sex, without being provided information about birth control.

The NSFG also documents large declines in formal instruction about birth control from 1995 to 2011–2013 falling from 87% to 60% of adolescent females and 81% to 55% of adolescent males. Although formal instruction on birth control has significantly declined, 9 out of 10 adolescents report receiving formal instruction about STIs.

Extensive modern scientific research has shown teaching young people about sex does not lead to early sexual experimentation. Additionally, Mathematica Policy Research, Inc.'s federally funded investigation of abstinence-only-until-marriage programs found that "youth in the program group were no more likely than control group youth to have abstained from sex and, among those who reported having had sex, they had similar numbers of sexual partners and had initiated sex at the same mean age". Public health professionals most often argue for the teaching of comprehensive education, citing that it improves public health outcomes.

=== Curriculum ===
Sex education in the twentieth century focused on abstinence and methods to prevent pregnancy. During the Second World War, in the context of fears about rising divorce rates, immigration, and birthright citizenship, the curriculum in some areas portrayed a woman's choice of a "fit" mate as a civic duty.

In the twenty-first century, common curriculum in American schools' sex education classes include "instruction on sexual health topics including human sexuality. HIV or STI prevention and pregnancy prevention are more commonly required in high school than in middle or elementary school." Statistics provided by the Center for Disease Control (CDC) reveal that between 2000 and 2014 the portion of schools providing information on sexual health education, including topics such as abstinence, puberty, and how to properly use a condom, declined. The CDC has identified 19 Critical Sexual Education Topics that should be taught in all middle and high schools. In 2014, fewer than half of high schools and only 20% of middle schools provided instruction on all 16 topics that the CDC considers essential to sexual health education.

==== High school ====
A statistics and policy report, based on CDC data and published by the Guttmacher Institute, shows that in 2014 72% of private and public high schools within the United States provided information on pregnancy prevention, and 76% taught that abstinence is "the most effective method to avoid pregnancy, HIV and other STIs." Although 61% of U.S. private and public high schools taught about contraceptive efficacy, only 35% required instruction on teaching students how to properly use a condom. Within the demographic of United States public and private high schools which taught pregnancy prevention, the average time spent in class teaching this topic was 4.2 hours.

==== Middle school ====
Statistics released by the CDC regarding public and private middle schools' within the United States policies and requirements on sex education in 2014 revealed that 30% of public and private U.S. middle schools included information about pregnancy prevention, 50% taught abstinence as the "most effective method to avoid pregnancy, HIV, and other STIs." 20% of U.S. public and private middle schools included instruction about contraceptive efficacy, and 10% required instruction to teach students how to properly use a condom. The CDC report also found that, on average, 2.7 hours of instruction about pregnancy prevention was required by U.S. public and private middle schools.

==== Elementary school ====
Traditionally, schools have begun teaching sex education in fifth and sixth grade, focusing primarily on puberty and reproductive anatomy and physiology. Sex education in these grades is often referred to as puberty education in order to reflect the emphasis on preparing children for the changes that all humans experience as they develop into adults. Little data is available for how much sex education is taught in elementary, but increasing numbers of schools are beginning developmentally appropriate sex education beginning in kindergarten in alignment with the National Sexuality Education Standards (NSES).

==== Public opinion ====
There have been numerous studies on the effectiveness of both approaches, and conflicting data on American public opinion. Public opinion polls conducted over the years have found that the majority of Americans favor broader sex education programs over those that teach only abstinence, although abstinence educators recently published poll data with the opposite conclusion. The poll sponsored by the National Abstinence Education Association (now called Ascend) and conducted by Zogby International reported information that has not been replicated in methodologically sound surveys. However, reports by NPR in conjunction with the Kaiser Family Foundation and the Kennedy School of Government found that 93 percent of Americans support sex education in schools, in one form or another.

Experts at University of California, San Francisco also encourage sex educators to include oral sex and emotional concerns as part of their curriculum. Their findings also support earlier studies that conclude:

...that sexual risk-taking should be considered from a dynamic relationship perspective, rather than solely from a traditional disease-model perspective. Prevention programs rarely discuss adolescents' social and emotional concerns regarding sex.... Discussion about potential negative consequences, such as experiencing guilt or feeling used by one's partner, may lead some adolescents to delay the onset of sexual behavior until they feel more sure of the strength of their relationship with a partner and more comfortable with the idea of becoming sexually active. Identification of common negative social and emotional consequences of having sex may also be useful in screening for adolescents at risk of experiencing more-serious adverse outcomes after having sex.

Sex education is still a debate in the United States to this day. Some parents believe that their children's school programs encourage sexual activity, and the schools believe that there are many students that do not get any sex education at home. The goal for the parents is for their children to follow their family values. Parents want the ability to teach their children what they want about sex education rather than school programs teaching them of certain things that parents are trying to avoid. Sex education programs in schools are mainly trying to give the students a complete picture about sex and sexuality. They want students to know their bodies as well as know how to protect them and make smart decisions.

In a study titled "Emerging Answers: Research Findings on Programs to reduce Teen Pregnancy" showed that abstinence-only sex education programs in schools rarely provide a positive impact on teens. However, evidence suggests that comprehensive sex education programs do help students to make their own decisions and to be safe no matter what they choose to do. Successful sex education programs are stated as those that tailor the curricula to students specific needs, address peer pressure and ways to respond to it, and discuss content in a way that is appropriate for students' age groups and level of sexual experience, all while providing accurate information.

==== Near-peer teaching ====
In the near-peer teaching model, a more experienced student (rather than a professional teacher) acts as the instructor and passes on their knowledge and experience to the students. The model has been often used to teach health education and bio-sciences.

A study found that in 7 out of 11 trials, the near-peer model was more effective than conventional teaching. The model has also been used as tool for peer educators to enhance their teaching and leadership skills, and studies have shown positive academic outcomes for the peers delivering the education.

A number of programs have employed the near-peer model. The Teen Prevention Education Program in New Jersey and North Carolina high schools aims to reduce teen pregnancy, by having 11th and 12th-grade students teach sexual health to ninth grade students. Results shows a positive impact of this program's model. Another example is the Peer Health Exchange, created by six Yale students in 2003. College undergraduate students teach comprehensive health education to 9th grade students in Title I schools. More than 2,000 college student volunteers serve over 17,000 public high school students through the program. Students were 17% more likely to visit a health center after completion of the 13 workshops compared to those that did not received the workshops. Additionally, students who received the 13 workshops were more likely to be able to accurately define consent, know how to access contraceptives, and identify signs of poor mental health than those who did not.

The "It's Okay to Ask Someone" app, was created in 2014 to serve as a sexual health text line that would reach beyond the classroom, in which peer educators could participate in by responding to students questions with adult oversight. The app was then launched in four high schools in western Pennsylvania in which peer educators answered student questions. IOTAS was successful and deemed to be time-effective in answering questions and maintained confidentiality. It also allowed the peer educators to be more involved in their communities and expand their own sexual health knowledge. Teen Health Source is a similar program facilitated by Planned Parenthood Toronto, Canada, in which trained youth volunteers (ages 16–19) answer sexual health questions from teens (age 13–19) via text, email, phone, or their chat website.

Near-peer has some challenges and drawbacks. The time commitment required for the peer to become an expert in sexual health makes this impractical. Also, one study found that peer educators (especially male) had difficulty with managing noise levels and classroom behavior, as they were not perceived as having the same authority as teachers. Further, peer educators encounter time management issues, with not enough time in each lesson, and the constraints of the school schedule also present difficulty. Finally, some peer educators reported that they felt they had not received enough support from teachers.

== Parental support ==
A 2004 NPR survey indicated that the majority of the 1001 parent groups polled wanted complete sex education in schools, as over 80% agreed with the statement "Sex education in school makes it easier for me to talk to my child about sexual issues", and under 17% of polled parents agreed with the statement that their children were being exposed to "subjects I don't think my child should be discussing". An additional 90% believed that their children's sexual education was "not too early", and 49% of the respondents were "somewhat confident" that the values taught in their children's sexual education classes were similar to those taught at home, with 23% of polled parents being somewhat less confident.

Many Supreme Court cases have been used by parents to retain their rights to control their child's education. For example, the U.S. Supreme Court's 1925 decision in Pierce v. Society of Sisters, stating "a child is not the mere creature of the state". Later cases continued to reaffirm parental rights, such as Wisconsin v. Yoder, where the Court held that Wisconsin's compulsory education law violated an Amish father's rights to take his children out of school to complete their education in Amish ways at home.

=== Regional parental support ===
Since the 2004 NPR survey, many researches have collected data indicating parental support on a statewide level.

A 2014 study in Florida, supported by the Behavioral Risk Factor Surveillance System (BRFSS) Survey administration and Florida Department of Health, questioned parents with school-age children for their perspectives on questions regarding school-based sex education. When the 1,715 participants were asked for their opinion regarding curriculum options, the majority group, 40.4%, supported comprehensive sex education (CSE), 23.2% favored abstinence-only, and 36.4% supported "abstinence-plus". Similar to CSE, "Abstinence-plus" sex education includes information about contraception and condoms; however, this information is presented in the "context of strong abstinence messages", such as reinforcing the importance of faithfulness. When asking about the inclusion of individual topics, the survey found that 72%-91% of parents supported high school education which included birth control and condom education in addition to communication skills, human anatomy/reproductive information, abstinence, HIV, STIs, and gender/sexual orientation issues. When asked about individual topics to be taught in middle school, 62%-91% of parents supported the previously listed topics. Parents were also asked about sexuality education topics being taught in elementary school, and 89% supported the inclusion of communication skills, 65% supported education on human anatomy and reproductive information, 61% supported the inclusion of information about abstinence, 53% supported information on HIV, and STIs and 52% supported education about gender and sexual orientation issues.

A 2011 study in Harris County Texas, conducted by the University of Texas Health Center, revealed that of the 1,201 parents who completed the survey, 93% of parents supported teaching sex education in school, 80% felt that sex education instruction should begin in middle school or prior to middle school and two thirds of survey participants felt that information about condoms and contraception should be included in sex education curriculum. The study also noted that Hispanic parents demonstrated the strongest support for school-based education which is medically accurate, and provides information on condoms and contraception.

A 2007 survey in Minneapolis Minnesota, conducted by the Division of Adolescent Health and Medicine at University of Minnesota, included 1,605 participants with school-age children who responded to telephone survey questions regarding items and attitudes towards sex education. 83% of parents supported CSE (comprehensive sex education) which teaches both contraception and abstinence. The survey demonstrated popular support for comprehensive sex education; the odds of parents who favored CSE as a more effective method for sex education than abstinence-only curriculum were 14.3 to 0.11. The survey revealed that parental for the inclusion of specific individual topics in school-based sex education was also high, ranging from 98.6% to 63.4%. The majority of parents also felt that school-based sex education should begin in middle school, or earlier.

A 2006 California survey asked 1,284 randomly selected, digitally-dialed parents of school-aged children for their perspectives on various matters regarding school-based sex education. When asked about curriculum preference 89% of parents overall preferred comprehensive sex education over the 11% who preferred abstinence-only curriculum. Among all of the regions surveyed, 87%-93% of parents supported CSE. The survey found that 64% of the 11% of respondents who supported abstinence-only curriculum cited absolutist reasons, such as purity-based morality concerns, as the basis for their preference. Of the CSE supporters, 94% cited at least one of the following three reasons; "those focused on the consequences of actions, on the importance of providing complete information, on the inevitability of adolescents' engaging in sex."

== Federal funding ==
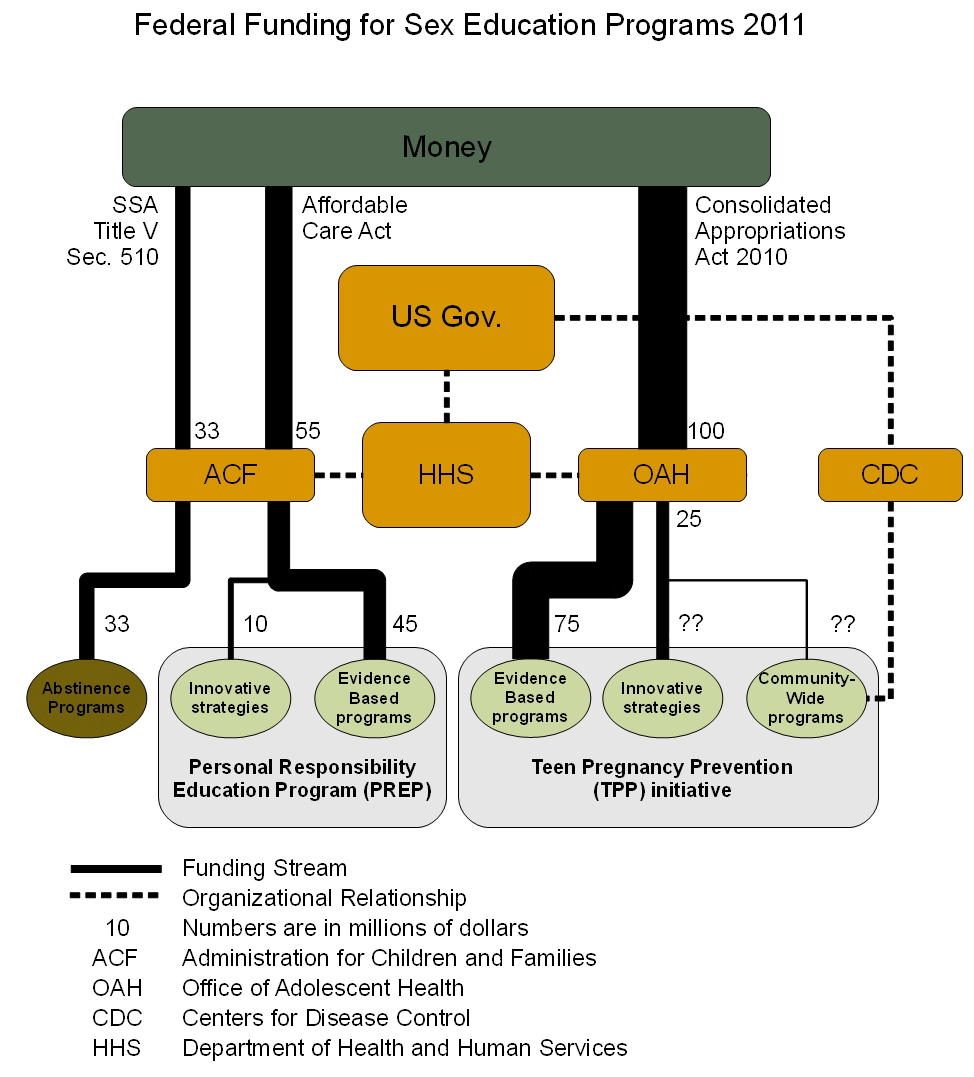
Federal Funding for Sex Education 2011

=== FY 2016 federal budget ===
In FY 2016 Congress provided $176 million in federal funding for sex education programs which were both medically accurate and age appropriate.

The funding includes the December 16, 2015 release of the FY 2016 Omnibus Funding Bill, The Consolidated Appropriations Act. The Omnibus Bill includes $101 million of level funding for TPP, the Teen Pregnancy Prevention Program from the Office of Adolescent Health (OAH). Evaluation funding in the FY 2016 Omnibus Bill remained at $6.8 million, as it had been in FY 2015. The Center for Disease Control's Division of Adolescent School and Health (DASH) was funded a $2 million increase from the previous year's funding level, resulting in $33.1 million in federal funding. $75 million was funded to the Personal Responsibility Education Program, an inclusive education program which provides information on contraception and the prevention of pregnancy and STIs and abstinence.

In FY 2016, $85 million was provided to abstinence education programs, including doubling annual funding for "AOUM" programs to $10 million, which may only be allotted to programs which promote abstinence only sex education, and the importance of refraining from any kind of sexual contact until marriage, (see A.O.U.M. sub-heading for more). Congress also provided $75 million to the Title V Abstinence education program, which includes an eight-point definition of abstinence-only education, and teaches that, regardless of age or circumstance, sex outside of marriage will lead to "harmful physical and psychological effects."

==== FY 2017 proposed budget ====
As of July 11, 2016:

On July 7, 2016, The House of Appropriations Labor, Health and Human Services and Education (LHHS) Subcommittee passed its draft of the Federal Budget, eliminating the TPP Program, funded in FY (Fiscal Year) 2016 at $101 million, and Title X Family Planning program, funded in FY 2016 at $286.5 million. In the LHHS's version of the bill, these programs are to be replaced with $20 million provided to "Sexual Risk Avoidance", or the abstinence education grant program. The Teen Pregnancy Prevention Program has contributed to a successful 35% decrease in teen pregnancy rates since its implementation in 2010, which is more than double the decline in teen pregnancy rates than any other sex education program has seen in the United States.

The Senate proposed their version of the bill, which provided level funding for both TPP and Title X Family Planning, one month prior. The Senate's bill included $15 million in funding for the competitive abstinence education grant program and $5 million funding increase over FY 2016, as opposed to LHHS's proposed $20 million for the competitive abstinence education grant program and $10 million increase over FY 2016.

As of July 11, 2016, the House has not released a deadline for a decision on whether of not the bill will officially pass and cut funding for TPP and the Family X Program, or consider the Senate's version of the bill.

=== Federal funding policy changes in 2010 ===
In 2010, Congress eliminated two federal programs that had funded abstinence-only education; the Adolescent Family Life (AFL) Prevention program and the Community-Based Abstinence Education (CBAE) program; $13 million and $99 million a year, respectively for a total of $112 million a year. The CBAE program was replaced in the FY 2010 Consolidated Appropriations Act, with a $114.5 million budget that includes $75 million provided to "go toward replicating programs that have been proven through rigorous evaluation to reduce teen pregnancy or its underlying or associated risk factors. A smaller pot ($25 million) is reserved to develop innovative strategies that have demonstrated at least some promise, and an additional $14.5 million is set aside for training, technical assistance, evaluation, outreach, and additional program support activities."

That same year, two new evidenced-based sex education programs were initiated; the Personal Responsibility Education Program (PREP), and the Teen Pregnancy Prevention (TPP) initiative; $55 million and $100 million, respectively, for a total of $155 million a year.

Funding for Title V, Section 510 abstinence-only education had expired in 2009, but was reinstated by a provision in the 2010 health care reform law by Senator Orrin Hatch. Although this funding stands at $50 million a year, only $33 million seems to have actually been awarded.

As of spring 2016, at implementation of federal funds is determined and allocated at state, individual state, district, and school board level. In 2014, the CDC conducted a "School Health Policies and Practices" study which revealed that, on average, schools require providing approximately 6.2 hours of education on human sexuality, with 4 or less hours of information on STIs, HIV, and pregnancy prevention.

=== A.O.U.M. ===
"A.O.U.M" is an acronym, which stands for "abstinence only until marriage". A.O.U.M is a federally-funded policy for sex education that was developed in the 1990s as a part of welfare reform, partially in reaction to the growth and development of adolescent sex and HIV education programs spanning the 1960s, 1970s and 1980s.

In-depth research has shown that the A.O.U.M policy has little influence in preventing students from engaging in sexual activity, is ineffective in reducing "sexual risk behaviors", and fails to improve the health outcomes of increasing contraceptive use and decreasing teen pregnancy rates.

Despite its lack of efficacy, the United States Congress has continued to fund A.O.U.M., increasing funding to $85 million a year in FY2016. President Barack Obama unsuccessfully attempted to terminate A.O.U.M, due to "10 years of opposition and concern from medical and public health professionals, sexuality educators, and the human rights community that AOUM withholds information about condoms and contraception, promotes religious ideologies and gender stereotypes and stigmatizes adolescents with non-heteronormative sexual identities."

== Sex education debate ==
Coined by Nancy Kendall, the "sex education debate" refers to the current binarized conversation surrounding sex education within the United States. The two sides, which supposedly exist in direct opposition to each other, are most commonly known as abstinence-only versus comprehensive sex education. According to Kendall, this debate pertains mainly to which style of teaching is most "effective" and "appropriate" for adolescents in both private and public schools. The debate itself consists of each side continuously criticizing the other for not reducing rates of unplanned pregnancy, transmission of STIs, and for not postponing first sexual activity in students. These criticisms are generally dealt in the form of studies conducted or sponsored by abstinence-only or comprehensive advocates, with the intent of once and for all convicting the other side of ineffectively educating.

The sex education debate has been critiqued as the main cause of the inadequacy of most current curricula; these curricula spend the majority of their material focusing on preventing STIs and teen pregnancy, rather than teaching about the emotional components of sexuality. These emotional components include but are not limited to topics of consent, pleasure, love, and constructive conversation techniques. Kendall articulates that amongst other factors, the debates have detrimental impacts on both teachers' and students' experiences in the sex education classroom. The cycle of the sex education debates (the seemingly endless attempts to disprove the "other" method) currently holds the focus of the field of sex education, slowing the creation and publication of potentially enriching materials.

== Comprehensive sex education ==
A 2002 study conducted by the Kaiser Family Foundation found that 58% of secondary school principals describe their sex education curriculum as comprehensive.

The American Psychological Association, the American Medical Association, the National Association of School Psychologists, the American Academy of Pediatrics, the American Public Health Association, the Society for Adolescent Medicine and the American College Health Association, have all stated official support for comprehensive sex education. Comprehensive sex education curricula are intended to reduce sexually transmitted disease and out-of-wedlock or teenage pregnancies. According to Emerging Answers 2007: Research Findings on Programs to Reduce Teen Pregnancy and Sexually Transmitted Diseases by Douglas Kirby, Ph.D., "a large body of evaluation research clearly shows that sex and HIV education programs included in this review do not increase sexual activity – they do not hasten the onset of sex, increase the frequency of sex, and do not increase the number of sexual partners."

The Future of Sex Education Project (FoSE) began in July 2007 when staff from Advocates for Youth, Answer and the Sexuality Information and Education Council of the U.S. (SIECUS) first met to discuss the future of sex education in the United States. At the time, each organization was looking ahead to the possibility of a future without federal abstinence-only-until-marriage funding and simultaneously found themselves exploring the question of how best to advance comprehensive sexuality education in schools. In May 2008, Advocates, Answer and SIECUS formalized these discussions with funding from the Ford Foundation, George Gund and Grove Foundations, and the FoSE Project was launched. The purpose of the project is to create a national dialogue about the future of sex education and to promote the institutionalization of comprehensive sexuality education in elementary schools. In "Sexuality Education in the United States: Shared Cultural Ideas across a Political Divide", Jessica Fields discusses that sexuality education seeks behavioral change, and believes that worded in specific terms, can be transparent and neutral. At the heart of sexuality debates, practice, and sexuality education lies a stable, rational, and unambiguous relationship between knowledge and behavior.

Proponents of this approach argue that sexual behavior after puberty is a given, and it is therefore crucial to provide information about the risks and how they can be minimized. They hold that abstinence-only sex ed and conservative moralizing will only alienate students and thus weaken the message. When information about risk, prevention, and responsible behavior is presented, it promotes healthy decision-making in youth.

A report issued by the Department of Health and Human Services has found the "most consistent and clear finding is that sex education does not cause adolescents to initiate sex when they would not otherwise have done so." The same report also found that:

Family life or sex education in the public schools, which traditionally has consisted largely of providing factual information at the secondary school level, is the most general or pervasive approach to preventing pregnancy among adolescents....Adolescents who begin having sexual intercourse need to understand the importance of using an effective contraceptive every time they have sex. This requires convincing sexually active teens who have never used contraception to do so. In addition, sexually active teens who sometimes use contraceptives need to use them more consistently (every time they have sex) and use them correctly.

Comprehensive sex education curricula offer medical data that is presented in an age appropriate manner. A wide spectrum of topics is covered in these programs, which include abstinence, contraception, relationships, sexuality and the prevention of disease (Siecus). The main focus is to educate youth so that they can make an informed decision about their own sexual activity and health. Approximately 2/3 of the 48 comprehensive programs that supported both abstinence and the use of condoms and contraceptives for sexually active teens demonstrated positive effects. According to Emerging Answers 2007: Research Findings on Programs to Reduce Teen Pregnancy and Sexually Transmitted Diseases by Douglas Kirby, Ph.D., "Over 40 percent of the programs delayed the initiation of sex, reduced the number of sexual partners, and increased condom or contraceptive use; almost 30 percent reduced the frequency of sex (including a return to abstinence); and more than 60 percent reduced unprotected sex". Studies have shown that the comprehensive programs work for youth population across the spectrum. Inexperienced, experienced, male, female, the majority of ethnic groups, and different communities all benefited from this type of curriculum. Yet unlike its counterpart, comprehensive sex education programs are ineligible for federal funding due to mandates against educating youth about contraception (Advocates For Youth). The proposed Responsible Education About Life Act (S. 972 and H.R. 1653) would provide federal funding for comprehensive sex education programs which include information on both abstinence and contraception and condoms.

From November 2-6th, 2013, the American Public Health Association will be holding a meeting in Boston, MA regarding a revolutionary new teaching method in regards to Sexual Education. Developed in Los Angeles in 2008, by the UCLA Art & Global Health Center and the LA public schools, the program "Focuses on self-empowerment and open dialogue about sexual health..the interventions include a performance of original material created by college students (known as Sex or Sex-Ed Squads), testimonials by HIV-positive people, and an interactive condom negotiation session." The presentation in November is to gain support for the notion that these art-based approaches are a capable means of education within the public health field

== Abstinence-only sex education ==
Abstinence-only sex education, also referred to as "abstinence only until marriage" (A.O.U.M) is an approach which emphasizes sexual abstinence prior to marriage to the exclusion of all other types of sexual and reproductive health education, particularly regarding birth control and safe sex. Adolescents are encouraged to be sexually abstinent until marriage and are not provided with information about contraception, leaving students with the impression that delaying sexual activity is the only viable option.

Abstinence-only education began its rise in the 1980s with the Adolescent Family Life Act, which encouraged young people in the United States to abstain from sexual intercourse prior to adulthood and marriage. The infiltration of abstinence only education was largely brought about by heteronormative Christian ideals of the 1970s and 1980s that wanted public schools to have a focus on the teachings of the bible. This specific avenue for sex education was given more relevance by the idea that sex- education that focused on reproductive health (i.e. Condoms, hormonal birth control) was promoting a fast and loose attitude about teenagers having sex. As opposed to providing resources for teens to engage in sexual activity, the abstinence only movement focused primarily on ways to avoid sexual pressure and express the perceived benefits to abstaining. As of right now, thirty eight out of the fifty states provide sex education and thirty of those thirty eight have a focus on abstinence at least until the end of the students teen years, some even promoting the abstaining of sexual activity until marriage.

Legally, abstinence-only education took a turn in the late 1980s with the Supreme Court case Bowen v. Kendrick, which the Court had to rule whether or not there was a first amendment violation in the Adolescent Family Life Act by requiring various religious and governmental organizations to continue their message in order to obtain funding. The court decided there was no violation, breaking down a huge hurdle for the pro-abstinence movement. Moreover, it wasn't until the 1980s-1990's in which AIDS/HIV was heightened, that abstinence only-education gained widespread attention. People knew what it was and what it was preaching. Abstinence only and sex education plays a big yet controversial role in the outcomes of sexual health of young adults. It largely affects the risk of teen pregnancy as well as STD's. Abstinence only-education is largely against the use of contraceptives and promotes the idea of not having sex outside of marriage. It excludes any sort of discussions in which talk about sexual health and or healthy relationships. Sex before marriage is seen as immoral and makes sure that their message is evident and clear for the younger audience, ones who are just now initiating in sexual activity. It teaches teens that not participating in any sort of sexual activity until marriage is the only morally and safe choice of route to go as sex before marriage is seen as immoral. Many people believe this is correct because it will prevent any sort of unexpected pregnancies. Other people argue that it is based on religious beliefs rather than scientific evidence. Additionally, they believe that it provides and promotes inaccurate information that reduces the overall sexual health of teens.

Research has shown that teachings of contraception were not associated with increased risk of adolescent sexual activity. Abstinence only programs were shown that it does not delay sexual activity. On the other hand, it is shown that risky behaviors are reduced due to the fact that is emphasized in its teachings. Furthermore, in the article, "Abstinence-only and Comprehensive Sex Education and the Initiation of Sexual Activity and Teen Pregnancy" it shows that adolescents who have received sex education were significantly less likely to report teen pregnancy than those who received no formal sex education. It concluded that teachings about contraception did not have to do with increased risk of adolescent sexual activity or STD's. Teens who receive sex education had a lower risk of pregnancy and less of an urge to engage in risky behaviors. Abstinence-only education is associated with the "Don't say gay" bill as they are both controversial topics related to sex education in the U.S. Both of these share a similar approach in which the conversation of sexuality is not discussed. Their approaches seem to prefer silence as they tend to avoid discussing and teaching comprehensive sex education. They both fail to provide young people with education regarding their bodies and sexuality.

Through direct funding and matching grant incentives, the U.S. government steered more than 1.5 billion dollars to abstinence-only education programs between 1996 and 2010.

In 1996, the federal government attached a provision to a welfare reform law establishing a program of special grants to states for abstinence-only-until-marriage programs. The program, Title V, § 510(b) of the Social Security Act (now codified as 42 U.S.C. § 710b), is commonly known as Title V. It created very specific requirements for grant recipients. Under this law, the term "abstinence education" means an educational or motivational program which:

1. Has as its exclusive purpose teaching the social, psychological, and health gains to be realized by abstaining from sexual activity;
2. Teaches abstinence from sexual activity outside marriage as the expected standard for all school-age children;
3. Teaches that abstinence from sexual activity is the only certain way to avoid out-of-wedlock pregnancy, sexually transmitted diseases, and other associated health problems;
4. Teaches that a mutually faithful monogamous relationship in the context of marriage is the expected standard of sexual activity;
5. Teaches that sexual activity outside of the context of marriage is likely to have harmful psychological and physical effects;
6. Teaches that bearing children out of wedlock is likely to have harmful consequences for the child, the child's parents, and society;
7. Teaches young people how to reject sexual advances and how alcohol and drug use increase vulnerability to sexual advances, and
8. Teaches the importance of attaining self-sufficiency before engaging in sexual activity.

Title V-funded programs were not permitted to advocate or discuss contraceptive methods except to emphasize their failure rates.

In 2000, the federal government began another large program to fund abstinence education, Community-Based Abstinence Education (CBAE). CBAE became the largest federal abstinence-only funding source, with $115 million granted for fiscal year 2006. The CBAE awards bypass state governments, offering federal grants directly to state and local organizations that provide abstinence-only education programs. Many of these grantees are faith-based or small non-profit organizations, including crisis pregnancy centers, which use their grants to provide abstinence-only programs and services in local public and private schools and to community groups.

In 2010, the Obama administration and Congress eliminated two federal abstinence-only programs - the Community-Based Abstinence Education (CBAE) grant program and the Adolescent Family Life Act (AFLA) Prevention program. The Title V program remains the only federal abstinence education program.

=== Evidence of effectiveness of A.O.U.M ===
While abstinence-only sex education is a controversial subject, the fact that complete abstinence itself (even within marriage) is the most effective preventative measure against both pregnancy and sexually transmitted infections has never been in dispute. What is in dispute is whether abstinence-only sex education actually succeeds in increasing abstinence. Various analyses show that abstinence-based programs have little to no effect on age of sexual initiation, number of sexual partners, or rates of abstinence, use of condoms, vaginal sex, pregnancy, or sexually transmitted diseases. In-depth research has shown that the A.O.U.M policy has little influence over preventing students from engaging in sexual activity, is ineffective in reducing "sexual risk behaviors" and fails to improve the health outcomes of increasing contraceptive use and decreasing teen pregnancy rates.

Despite its lack of efficacy, the United States congress has continued to fund A.O.U.M., increasing funding to $85 million a year in FY2016. President Barack Obama unsuccessfully attempted to terminate A.O.U.M, due to "10 years of opposition and concern from medical and public health professionals, sexuality educators, and the human rights community that AOUM withholds information about condoms and contraception, promotes religious ideologies and gender stereotypes and stigmatizes adolescents with non-heteronormative sexual identities."

=== Criticism of abstinence-only sex education in the U.S. Congress ===
Two major studies by Congress have increased the volume of criticism surrounding abstinence-only education.

In 2004, U.S. Congressman Henry Waxman of California released a report that provides several examples of inaccurate information being included in federally funded abstinence-only sex education programs. This report bolstered the claims of those arguing that abstinence-only programs deprive teenagers of critical information about sexuality. The claimed errors included:

- misrepresenting the failure rates of contraceptives
- misrepresenting the effectiveness of condoms in preventing HIV transmission, including the citation of a discredited 1993 study by Dr. Susan Weller, when the federal government had acknowledged it was inaccurate in 1997 and larger and more recent studies that did not have the problems of Weller's study were available
- false claims that abortion increases the risk of infertility, premature birth for subsequent pregnancies, and ectopic pregnancy
- treating stereotypes about gender roles as scientific fact
- other scientific errors, e.g. stating that "twenty-four chromosomes from the mother and twenty-four chromosomes from the father join to create this new individual" (the actual number is 23).

Out of the 13 grant-receiving programs examined in the 2004 study, the only two not containing "major errors and distortions" were Sex Can Wait and Managing Pressures Before Marriage, each of which was used by five grantees, making them two of the least widely used programs in the study. With the exception of the FACTS program, also used by 5 grantees, the programs found to contain serious errors were more widely used, ranging in usage level from 7 grantees (the Navigator and Why kNOw programs) to 32 grantees (the Choosing the Best Life program). Three of the top five most widely used programs, including the top two, used versions of the same textbook, Choosing the Best, from either 2003 (Choosing the Best Life) or 2001 (Choosing the Best Path — the second most widely used program with 28 grantees — and Choosing the Best Way, the fifth most widely used program with 11 grantees).

In 2007, a study ordered by Congress found that middle school students who took part in abstinence-only sex education programs were just as likely to have sex in their teenage years as those who did not. From 1999 to 2006, the study tracked more than 2,000 students from age 11 or 12 to age 16; the study included students who had participated in one of four abstinence education programs, as well as a control group who had not participated in such a program. By age 16, about half of each group students in the abstinence-only program as well as students in the control group were still abstinent. Abstinence program participants who became sexually active during the 7-year study period reported having similar numbers of sexual partners as their peers of the same age; moreover, they had sex for the first time at about the same age as other students. The study also found that students who took part in the abstinence-only programs were just as likely to use contraception when they did have sex as those who did not participate. Abstinence-only education advocates claim the study was too narrow, began when abstinence-only curricula were in their infancy, and ignored other studies that have shown positive effects.

Other criticisms of abstinence-only sex education include emphasizing conventional gender and heterosexual norms and expression, excluding members of the LGBT community. LGBT community members cannot always utilize programs or recommendations from abstinence-only programs as they are not geared toward transgender and homosexual relationships.

=== Criticism of abstinence-only sex education by the scientific and medical communities ===
Abstinence-only education has been criticized in official statements by the American Psychological Association, the American Medical Association, the National Association of School Psychologists, the Society for Adolescent Medicine, the American College Health Association, the American Academy of Pediatrics, and the American Public Health Association, which all maintain that sex education needs to be comprehensive to be effective.

The AMA "urges schools to implement comprehensive... sexuality education programs that... include an integrated strategy for making condoms available to students and for providing both factual information and skill-building related to reproductive biology, sexual abstinence, sexual responsibility, contraceptives including condoms, alternatives in birth control, and other issues aimed at prevention of pregnancy and sexual transmission of diseases... [and] opposes the sole use of abstinence-only education..."

The American Academy of Pediatrics states that "Abstinence-only programs have not demonstrated successful outcomes with regard to delayed initiation of sexual activity or use of safer sex practices... Programs that encourage abstinence as the best option for adolescents, but offer a discussion of HIV prevention and contraception as the best approach for adolescents who are sexually active, have been shown to delay the initiation of sexual activity and increase the proportion of sexually active adolescents who reported using birth control."

On August 4, 2007, the British Medical Journal published an editorial concluding that there is "no evidence" that abstinence-only sex education programs "reduce risky sexual behaviours, incidence of sexually transmitted infections, or pregnancy" in "high income countries".

In February 2017, Journal of Adolescent Health found that A.O.U.M policies "reinforce harmful gender stereotypes" as well as fail to bring down teen pregnancy and STI rates.

=== Virginity pledges ===
Virginity pledges (or "abstinence pledge") are a written or oral promise that young people make to remain abstinent until marriage. Although often linked to religious abstinence-only programs, virginity pledges have recently become included in many secular abstinence-only programs as well.

A virginity pledge may look like this:

I, _____________, promise to abstain from sex until my wedding night. I want to reserve my sexual powers to give life and love for my future spouse and marriage. I will respect my gift of sexuality by keeping my mind and thoughts pure as I prepare for my true love. I commit to grow in character to learn to live love and freedom.

A purity ring can be a symbol of a virginity pledge.

A study done at Columbia University showed that, while many adolescents who take virginity pledges do choose to abstain from sexual activity, those who eventually break their pledge are at a higher risk for unsafe sex their first time than adolescents who did not take a virginity pledge at all. The study also showed that virginity pledges were most effective within a small group of pledgers in an at least partially nonnormative setting, meaning that if abstinence is not the norm, those taking a virginity pledge are more likely to adhere to it.

The National Longitudinal Survey of Youth has found that, while pledgers are more likely to abstain until marriage than non-pledgers – 99% of whom will have sex before marriage – 88% of the pledgers studied had vaginal intercourse before marriage. Out of those who pledge, there was a significant delay in first experience with vaginal intercourse, with an average delay of 18 months. However, people who took a virginity pledge were found to be less likely to have protected sex upon initiation and less likely to get STI tested if a concern arose.

== Consent curriculum ==
Though the concept of consent is often seen as a fundamental pillar of sex education curriculum, research shows few states view it as a necessity to K-12 education. Of the 18 states examined, it was found only one – the State of Oregon – explicitly required students to define the means of consent in a sexual context: a standard not mandatory until high school, as consent is only briefly mentioned in Oregon's middle school curriculum. It is worth noting the State of New Jersey does make reference to sexual consent; however, little is said whether there exists criteria for students to showcase comprehension.

More often, consent is seen within the domain of upper-level education. Many states have specific legislation mandating public state universities to implement this curriculum, such as California and New York. With 30.3% of high school graduates not going onto university, lack of consent standards in high school classrooms leaves a sizable portion of young adults never receiving a formal education on the topic.

== Gender in sex education ==
Like all topics relating to sexuality, gender is a fundamental part of sexual education, and ideas of gender and sex are closely related in American culture. However, there is evidence of gendered messages within American school-based sex education that may lead to the continued existence of harmful stereotypes about gender and sexuality.

=== Abstinence-only ===
The Journal of Adolescent Health conducted a study entitled "Abstinence-Only-Until-Marriage: An Updated Review of U.S. Policies and Programs and Their Impact". This study found that abstinence-only sex education reinforces harmful gender stereotypes regarding female passivity and "rigid masculinity", both of which are associated with decreased use of condoms and birth control. Because of this association, the researchers concluded that these stereotypes "undermine adolescent sexual health". Research by Paul Dale Kleinert found that abstinence-only programs most often did not include information about sexual orientation or gender identity. Additional research by Jillian Grace Norwick conducted in 2016 found that in interviews with female college students who had abstinence-only sex education, participants commonly reported that they received messages about sexual "purity" aimed at girls.

=== Gender roles ===
A study from the University of Michigan conducted by Laina Bay-Cheng explored how school based sex education sometimes enforces traditional gender roles due to the "normalization" of heterosexual penile vaginal intercourse in monogamous relationships with socially accepted gender roles. The same programs fail to discuss the diversity of human sexual activities that do not fit inside the "norm". The study also suggested that these programs can portray girls as sexual victims and evoke such popular phrases as "boys will be boys" when discussing sexual assault and rape, leading students to believe that girls should be more responsible in order to avoid sexual assault. Other studies, such as Karin Martin's article "Gender Differences in the ABC's of the Birds and the Bees: What Mothers Teach Young Children About Sexuality and Reproduction" explore the different ways adolescents learn about sexuality from various sources, such as the media, religion, and family culture, specifically parents. This study asserts that gender roles, while introduced at very early ages, are emphasized and reinforced at adolescence. Paul Dale Kleinert also conducted research regarding this topic. His 2016 dissertation reviews the ways that school based sex education is rooted in societal structures such as gender roles, but the type of program, comprehensive, abstinence-only, or abstinence-plus, can greatly affect how strict and/or how traditional gender roles within sexuality are portrayed.

=== Sexuality in school culture ===
Another influence on the perception of student sexuality is school culture, as illustrated by Louisa Allen's study "Denying the Sexual Subject: Schools' Regulation of Student Sexuality". This study outlines how school culture can lead students to perceive themselves as having varying levels of sexual agency based on gender while also creating a normalized sexuality similar to that in the Bay-Cheng study. Regardless of the material included in the curricula of school based sex education, the general attitude surrounding sex within individual schools can influence the ways students think about their own sexuality and sexual experiences.

== LGBT sex education ==
LGBT sex education includes the teachings of safe sex practices for people of all gender and sexual orientation identities, not just those participating in heterosexual sexual activities. Studies showed that many schools as of 1995 did not offer such educational tracks, possibly due to a controversy over whether or not LGBT education should be integrated into course curricula. The lack of information distributed regarding mentally and physically healthy LGBT relationships can also be attributed to the ongoing stigma surrounding queerness in the US, especially as related to adolescents.

=== State policies ===
In the United States, 13 states require discussion of sexual orientation in sex education. Of those 13 states, 9 require discussion of sexual orientation to be inclusive, while 4 states require only negative information be presented regarding LGBT-related sexual orientation. Arizona provides HIV education with the condition that if and when it is taught, HIV education curriculum cannot promote a "homosexual lifestyle", or "portray homosexuality in a positive manner". Similarly, Oklahoma HIV education teaches, "among other behaviors, that 'homosexual activity' is considered to be 'responsible for contact with the AIDS virus.'"

On October 1, 2015, Governor of California Jerry Brown signed a law mandating sexual health education effective January 1, 2016. Known as the "California Healthy Young Act", the law requires that all sex ed curricula used in public 7-12th grade classrooms contain accurate information pertaining to gender and sexual orientation. Assembly Bill 329 also requires that the curriculum "affirmatively recognize that people have different sexual orientations." While it has been difficult for the state to guarantee that this bill is implemented effectively and evenly across schools, the bill has been met with little resistance by educators or parents.

=== Pro-LGBT sex education ===
In the United States, in public school programs where LGBT sex education is not a part of the sex education curriculum, LGBT students are more likely to engage in riskier sex, ultimately leading to higher rates of HIV/AIDS and other sexually transmitted infections, such as gonorrhea and chlamydia, as well as more reported cases of teenage pregnancy. This problem does not occur as frequently for LGBT students who are in enrolled in public schools with programs that cover LGBT sexual issues in their sex education courses. Additionally, LGBT students who do not receive specialized sex education are more likely to search online in order to seek additional resources in order to learn more about their sexuality or identity, which may not be safe or factual. Often, young LGBT students will learn about their sexualities from finding pornographic movies on the internet. The inclusion of LGBT curriculum in sex education courses has also been shown to decrease bullying of students who identify as LGBT in United States public schools.

=== Anti-LGBT sex education ===
The more conservative side who oppose LGBT inclusive sex education argue that it will force a sexuality onto children; however, research shows that inclusive education does not change sexual orientation, but it does reduce LGBT harassment in schools. Advocates against LGBT sex education might also say that this will promote sexual experiences with youth and premarital sex, but those factors occur in places with and without LGBT inclusive sex education curriculum, but lower pregnancy rates and sexually transmitted infection rates.

The "Don't Say Gay" legislation impacts the ability for LGBTQ+ youth to gather sexual health information and learn how to engage in safe sex practices by eliminating the discussion of queer-sex related topics in school. This could leave many queer students absent of self-protective resources and information that their heterosexual peers are given. In this case, queer students are then left to find information from outside resources, such as the internet which leaves queer students vulnerable to sex based diseases and infections that can cause major health complications.

Early legislative acts of what the media deemed as the "Don't Say Gay'' campaign started in both Missouri and Tennessee. In particular, Tennessee first proposed "don't say gay" legislation in 2005, Bill 229, although it only gained traction in 2009 when the state senate passed the bill. This legislation focused on silencing the discussion of LGBTQ+ issues in public schools. This includes prevention of discussing queer sex education for all students that attended public school in these states. The 2012 Bill 229 was passed through the Tennessee House Education subcommittee. Later in 2013 Senator Stacey Canfield amended the campaign with Bill 234 to allow personal discussions on homosexuality and gender non-conforming issues with teachers and guidance counselors; however, it mandated the reporting of students' sexual identity to the parents after these conversations occurred.

In 2012 Missouri produced House Bill 2051, a similar bill to Tennessee which purpose was to uphold heteronormative family values by prohibiting LGBTQ+ discourse in school and clubs associated with nonheteronormative sexualities. Supporters of the legislation argue that this bill upholds a constitutionally protected right to manage the education of their children, which is articulated in the Constitution's fourteenth amendment's due process clause. However, dissenters argue that it could affect students, teachers, and other faculties' practice of the first amendment right to free speech. This bill was not cemented in law because of the public disapproval.

The Florida House Bill 1557 was enacted in Florida in elementary schools starting July 1, 2022, signed by Governor Ron DeSantis. The bill prohibits school instructors from discussing and administering content that involves identity and sexual orientation. Dissenters of this bill have stated that young LGBTQ+ children lacking support in their home environments will suffer significantly as teachers and counselors can no longer offer assistance and comfort. All discussion involving topics of gender and sexuality is wholly prohibited from kindergarten through third grade. Instruction on how these topics should be administered to students remains vague, with the only clarification that it must be age and developmentally appropriate according to government statements. Any violation of the bill is considered a warrant for prosecution with financial consequences covered by the school in question. The bill initially included clauses that required schools "out" students associating with the LGBTQ+ to their guardians. These clauses have since then been removed by Representative Joe Harding. President Joe Biden has criticized the act and pledged to support its removal. Supporters of the bill claim that including LGBTQ+ topics in schools' curricula is a form of grooming, and its removal empowers parents to be more involved in their children's upbringing. Dissentients of the bill argue that the criminalization of LGTBQ+ education and the labeling of "grooming" is discrimination based on sexual orientation and gender.

In April 2025, the Trump administration demanded that states receiving money for PREP remove all references to gender identity, transgender and non-binary people from the curriculum, referring to it as "gender ideology". As of October 2025, at least eleven states have complied with the demands, while 16 other states and Washington DC have filed a lawsuit. On October 27, 2025, the deadline given by the administration to comply or risk losing federal funding, U.S. district court judge Ann Aiken ruled that the Department of Health and Human Services (HHS) may not cut funding from states that do not comply.

=== Controversy ===
Supporters of LGBT sex education argue that encompassing all gender and sexual identifications provides LGBT students with the health information pertinent to them, such as STI prevention for same-sex intimacy. Furthermore, these teachings could help prevent low self-esteem, depression, and bullying, as indicated through research. Opponents of LGBT-friendly sex education claim that teaching health topics in this way could be disrespectful to some religious beliefs and potentially inflict particular political views on students.

== Sex education policies and access ==
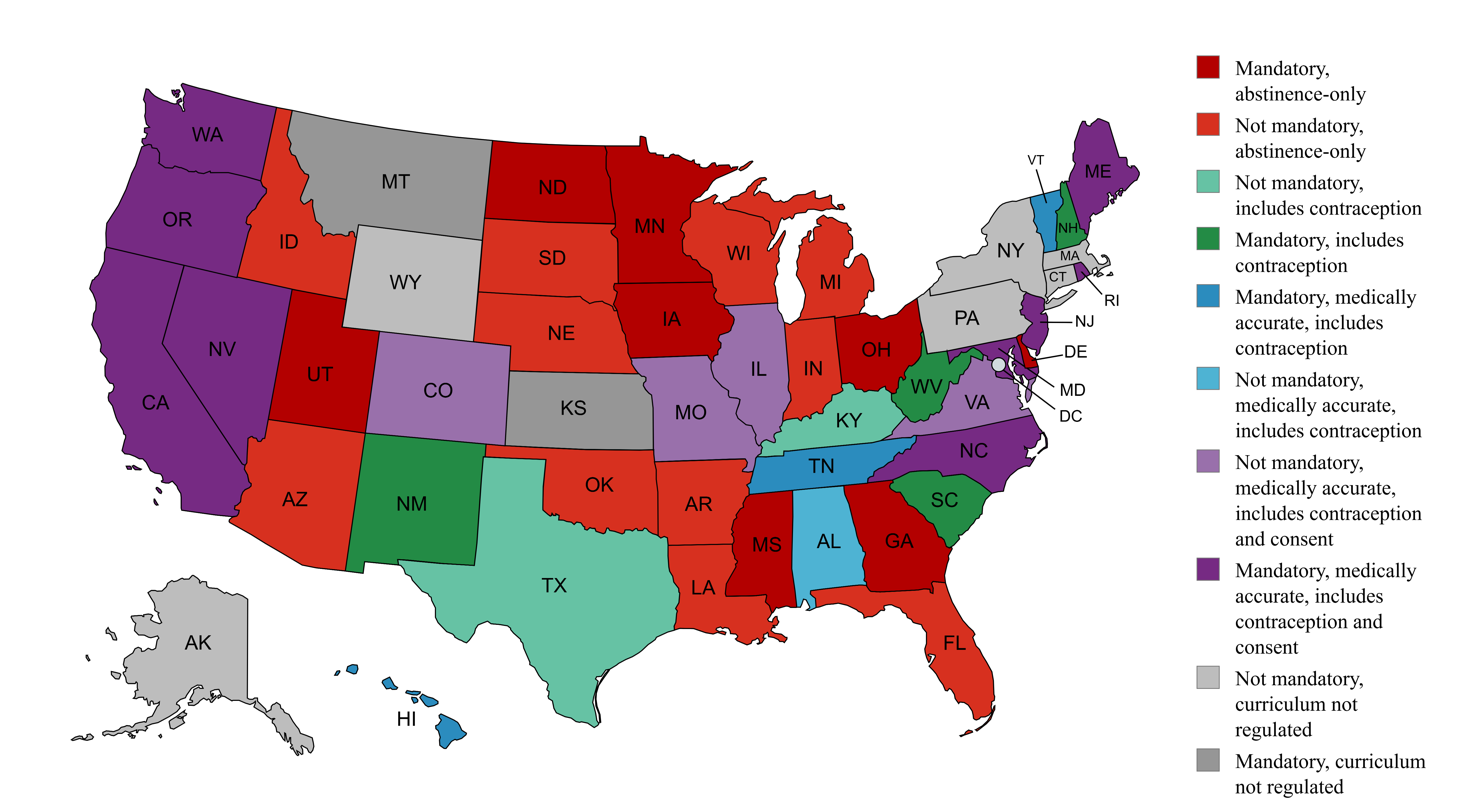
Sex education curriculum by state

Receipt of formal sex education has been found to correlate with important factors, such as age, income, race, location, and background.

=== Regional influences ===
There are significant differences in the content of sexual education in different geographic regions of the U.S. While sex education is taught at nearly every high school in the United States, local beliefs and practices regarding sex heavily influence the way that sex education is taught. In general, teaching some form of sex education is widely supported by the American public, but beliefs on whether or not sex should be only between married people can dictate if local schools teach abstinence only education, or if they include lessons about contraceptives and STI prevention. States in the Southern and Midwestern parts of the United States are likely to believe that sex should only happen within a marriage. They are also the states with the highest percentage of schools teaching abstinence-only sex education. This leads to reduced odds of education on a wide variety of topics and methods for students in those areas that teach abstinence-only education. The Western and Northeastern parts of the United States are likely to include lessons about various methods of engaging in sexual activity and using contraceptives and/or STI prevention tools. States in the Midwest, South, and West are more likely than schools in the Northeast to teach about the ineffectiveness of non-natural birth control methods or just not cover them at all. Despite these differences, most of the United States favors stressing abstinence, via abstinence-only or the abstinence best approach. However, community and regional views on premarital sex are ultimately reflected in whether or not, and to what degree, the methods of practicing safe sex are additionally taught to students. Some varied regional examples are provided below.

==== Florida ====
Sex education is not mandatory in Florida, but the state has implemented a comprehensive health education curriculum that teaches pregnancy and considers abstinence to be the "expected social standard". In such courses, students learn about monogamy, heterosexual marriages, and abstinence until marriage. Though courses are taught, parents and guardians are able to opt-out of allowing students to learn with written communication and consent given to their school. Several Florida House bills were proposed to implement the Florida Healthy Adolescent Act by which schools were to be required to introduce students to comprehensive and medically accurate health information that was age appropriate about sexuality, healthy relationships, and contraception. The Senate vetoed the bills to pass the act.

==== Mississippi ====
Sex education in Mississippi public schools was first introduced in 2011, with the requirement that schools teach "abstinence-only" or "abstinence-plus" curriculum. This law had additional requirements, such as the separation of boys and girls for instruction and not allowing instructors to physically demonstrate contraceptive use, such as condoms. This law was updated as of July 1, 2021. The state's Department of Education announced they would now mandate curricula to be "culturally proficient, evidence-based, medically accurate, and age-appropriate for middle and high school students". This was the first time such inclusive measures would be included. However, sex education is still not compulsory, both due to district decisions and individual parents through an "opt-in policy".

Mississippi, tied with Alabama, is the most highly religious state based on a number of indicators, such as 82% of adults believing in God with absolute certainty. Due to how religious and conservative the state is, advocates for comprehensive sex education often use the state of Mississippi as an example of the negative consequences and failures of abstinence-only education.

==== Tennessee ====
Tennessee has no mandatory sexual education curriculum in place, leaving individual school districts to oversee their own sex ed curricula if it is chosen to be taught. Many of those school districts have relied heavily on abstinence-led curricula. Tennessee schools have created a mandatory family life education program if females ages 15–17 have pregnancy rates higher than 19.5 per every 1000 depending on the county. In 2012, state legislature advanced Senate Bill 3310, otherwise known as the "Gateway Law," to enforce abstinence only sexual education and limit the information given to students by educators that encourage sexual activities with penalties of $500 if done. More recently, in 2017, state legislature passed Senate Bill 1510 to provide intervention, treatment, and prevention of child sex abuse. Though Senate Bill 1510 was implemented, it continued to forbid promoting sexual activities and dispense contraception on school property. Currently pending is Senate Bill 646 where curriculum for students includes "medically accurate and age appropriate" sex education. In doing so, students are able to obtain information about consent, abstinence, sexually transmitted diseases, pregnancy, and communication skills among other things.

==== Texas ====
Sex education in Texas became a policy of renewed focus in 2024. With the rise of recent protests and proposed bills in the Texas House, the current policy has been the focus of much scrutiny. As of 1997, when Senate Bill 1 was enacted, Texas has left the decision of inclusion of sex education classes within schools up to the individual districts. The school board members are entitled to approve all curricula that are taught; however, the bill has certain criteria that a school must abide by when choosing to teach sex ed. These include:

- present abstinence from sexual activity as the preferred choice of behavior in relationship to all sexual activity for unmarried persons of school age;
- devote more attention to abstinence from sexual activity than to any other behavior;
- emphasize that abstinence from sexual activity, if used consistently and correctly, is the only method that is 100 percent effective in preventing pregnancy, sexually transmitted diseases, infection with Human Immunodeficiency Virus (HIV) or Acquired Immune Deficiency Syndrome (AIDS), and the emotional trauma associated with adolescent sexual activity;
- direct adolescents to a standard of behavior in which abstinence from sexual activity before marriage is the most effective way to prevent pregnancy, sexually transmitted diseases, and infection with HIV or AIDS; and
- teach contraception and condom use in terms of real-world failure rates, not statistics based on laboratory rates, if instruction on contraception and condoms is included in curriculum content.

Additionally, school districts are not authorized to distribute condoms in connection with instruction relating to human sexuality.

Since the enactment of this policy, several research studies have been done to evaluate the Sex Ed Policy, namely the abstinence-only aspect of the teaching. Drs. David Wiley and Kelly Wilson published the Just Say Don't Know: Sexuality Education in Texas Public Schools report where they found that:

- Shaming and fear-based instruction are commonly used for teaching sex ed
- Gender stereotypes are promoted
- A majority of students receive no information about human sexuality except abstinence
- The materials used regularly contain factual errors and distort the truth about condoms and STDs

According to Texas State Representative Mike Villarreal, "We have a responsibility to ensure that our children receive accurate information in the classroom, particularly when students' health is at stake," Villarreal said. "We're dealing with a myriad of problems in Texas as a result of our sky high teen pregnancy rates. We cannot allow our schools to provide erroneous information—the stakes are far too high." With this in mind, many state legislators have proposed bills to improve sex education in Texas Schools.

- SB 852/HB 1624 – In Feb 2011, Senator Ellis proposed The Education Works bill. This bill would require schools that teach sex education to provide evidence-based, age-appropriate information that emphasizes the importance of abstinence as the only 100% effective method of avoiding sexually transmitted infections (STIs) and pregnancy, while also teaching about contraceptive methods to avoid STIs and pregnancy.
- HB 741/SB 515 – In 2011, Representatives Joaquin Castro and Mike Villarreal introduced a bill calling for abstinence-plus sexual health education bill. The bill would have medically accurate information, including: abstinence, contraception, and what it really takes to be a parent. The bill received a hearing but was left in committee.
- HB 1567/ SB 1076 – Introduced in 2009 by Villarreal, this bill would have required instruction on contraceptive use to be scientifically accurate when it is taught as part of a school's sexual health curriculum. It did not receive a hearing.

Scientific evidence accumulated over many decades demonstrates that the abstinence-only-until-married (AOUM) curriculum taught in Texas schools is harmful and ineffective in reducing the adolescent pregnancy rate in Texas. Despite these facts, recently published in the Journal of Adolescent Health, AOUM programs continue to be funded by the U.S. government. In fact, the U.S. government has spent more than $2 billion over the last 20 years to prohibit comprehensive sex education in public schools, choosing instead to fund the AOUM curriculum while the adolescent pregnancy rates continue to rise.

Catholic schools in Texas follow Catholic Church teachings in regard to sex education. Some opponents of sex education in Catholic schools believe sex ed programs are doing more harm to the young than good. Opponents of sex education contend that children are not mentally and emotionally ready for this type of instruction, and believe that exposing the young to sex ed programs may foster the students with the preoccupation of sex.

The Catholic Church believes that parents are the first educators and should rightfully fight for their duty as such in regard to sex education:

- Humanae Vitae teaches that the faithful must form their 'consciences' as a guide to Christ-like decision making in regard to sex education.
- the young should not engage in premarital sex, adultery, fornication or other acts of impurity or scandals to others
- Pope John Paul II says that sex education is "a basic right and duty of parents."

==== Virginia ====
Virginia uses the sex education program called the National Campaign to prevent teen and unplanned pregnancy. The National Campaign was created in 1996 and focuses on preventing teen and unplanned pregnancies of young adults. The National Campaign set a goal to reduce the teen pregnancy rate by one-third in ten years. The Virginia Department of Health ranked Virginia 19th in teen pregnancy birth rates in 1996. Virginia was also rated 35.2 teen births per 1,000 girls aged 15–19 in 2006. The Healthy People 2010 goal is a teen pregnancy rate at or below 43 pregnancies per 1,000 females age 15–17.

=== General policies ===
As of July 1, 2022:

- 26 states mandate both sex education and HIV education be provided.
- 2 states only mandate sex education.
- 11 states only mandate HIV education.
- 39 states (and the District of Columbia) mandate that sex and/or HIV education be provided.
  - In Tennessee sex education becomes mandated if the pregnancy rate for young women, ranging from ages 15–17, is equal to or higher than 19.5.
- 17 states require that, when provided, sex education be medically accurate.
  - California, Colorado, Hawaii, Illinois, Iowa, Louisiana, Missouri, Maine, New Jersey, North Carolina, Oregon, Rhode Island, Tennessee, Utah, Virginia, Washington
- 4 states ban the promotion of religion in sex education.
  - California, Louisiana, Colorado, Illinois
- 10 states require that sex education cannot be biased against any race or ethnicity, and must be culturally appropriate and pertinent to the students' background.
  - California, Colorado, Illinois, Iowa, Massachusetts, New Jersey, Oregon, Rhode Island, Tennessee, Washington
- 26 states (and the District of Columbia) require that age-appropriate information is provided in the sex education curriculum.
  - Alabama, Arizona, California, Colorado, District of Columbia, Florida, Hawaii, Illinois, Iowa, Maine, Mississippi, Missouri, Montana, Nevada, New Jersey, New Mexico, North Carolina, Oregon, Rhode Island, South Carolina, Tennessee, Texas, Vermont, Virginia, Washington, New York, Pennsylvania.
- 20 states (and the District of Columbia) require that, when provided, sex education must include information on contraception.
  - Alabama, California, Colorado, Connecticut, Delaware, District of Columbia, Hawaii, Illinois, Maine, Maryland, New Jersey, New Mexico, North Carolina, Oregon, Rhode Island, South Carolina, Texas, Vermont, Virginia, Washington, West Virginia.
- 14 states require that, when provided, sex education covers sexual orientation in either an inclusive or negative way.
  - 11 states (and the District of Columbia) require an inclusive perspective on sexual orientation be given.
    - California, Colorado, Connecticut, Delaware, District of Columbia, Illinois, Iowa, Maryland, New Jersey, Oregon, Rhode Island, Washington
  - 4 states require that only negative information on sexual orientation be presented.
    - Florida, Louisiana, Mississippi, Texas

==== Abstinence education ====
As of 2023, 17 states provide abstinence-only sex education.

As of July 1, 2022:

39 states (and District of Columbia) require abstinence education be provided.

29 states require abstinence to be stressed.

- Alabama, Arizona, Arkansas, Colorado, Delaware, Florida, Georgia, Hawaii, Idaho, Illinois, Indiana, Kentucky, Louisiana, Maine, Michigan, Mississippi, Missouri, New Jersey, North Carolina, South Carolina, Ohio, Tennessee, Texas, Utah, Wisconsin, Washington

10 states (and District of Columbia) require abstinence to be covered.

- California, Connecticut, District of Columbia, Maryland, New Hampshire, New Mexico, North Dakota, Virginia, Vermont, West Virginia

19 states require that instruction regarding the importance of waiting to engage in sexual relations until marriage be included.

- Alabama, Arkansas, Florida, Georgia, Illinois, Indiana, Louisiana, Michigan, Mississippi, Missouri, North Carolina, North Dakota, Ohio, South Carolina, Tennessee, Texas, Utah, Virginia, Wisconsin

17 states (and the District of Columbia) require that discussion be included regarding potential negative outcomes of teen pregnancy and sex.

- Arizona, Colorado, Connecticut, District of Columbia, Florida, Indiana, Mississippi, Missouri, New Mexico, North Carolina, North Dakota, Ohio, Rhode Island, Tennessee, Texas, Vermont, Virginia, West Virginia

==== Parental role ====
As of January 1, 2023:

States vary in policy regarding parental role in sex education; some states require parental consent to teach certain aspects of the sex/HIV education curriculum while others require that parents are active participants in the education.

- 40 states (and the District of Columbia) require the inclusion of parents in sex and/or HIV education.
- 25 states (and the District of Columbia) require that parents are notified that sex and/or HIV education is being provided.
- 35 states (and the District of Columbia) provide parents with the opportunity to opt their children out of sex education.
  - Alabama, Alaska, California, Colorado, Connecticut, District Of Columbia, Florida, Georgia, Hawaii, Idaho, Illinois, Indiana, Iowa, Louisiana, Maine, Maryland, Massachusetts, Michigan, Missouri, Montana, New Hampshire, New Jersey, New Mexico, Ohio, Oklahoma, Oregon, South Carolina, Virginia, Washington, West Virginia, Wisconsin
  - In Arizona, New York, Pennsylvania, Rhode Island, and Vermont, parents can opt their child out of HIV education.
- 6 states require parental consent prior to allowing students to participate in sex and/or HIV education. Policies requiring parental consent prior to sex education are known as opt-in policies.
  - Arizona, Mississippi, Nevada, Tennessee, Texas, Utah

==== Teaching healthy sexuality ====
Some sex education curricula include instruction regarding healthy practices for relationships and sexuality. This instruction can vary from a broad range of topics, such as communication strategies to maintaining sexual health.

As of May 1, 2018:

- 28 states (and the District of Columbia) require that when sex education is provided it includes information regarding healthy "Life Skills", including; healthy decision making, healthy sexuality (including avoiding/preventing coerced sex), and family communication.
  - Alabama, Arizona, Arkansas, California, Colorado, Delaware, District of Columbia, Hawaii, Kentucky, Illinois, Maine, Maryland, Michigan, Minnesota, Mississippi, Missouri, New Jersey, New Mexico, North Carolina, Oregon, Rhode Island, Tennessee, Texas, Utah, Vermont, Virginia, Washington, West Virginia
- 22 states (and the District of Columbia) require that sex education curriculum discuss skills and information to prevent coerced sex.
  - Alabama, Arizona, Arkansas, Colorado, Delaware, District of Columbia, Illinois, Maryland, Michigan, Mississippi, Missouri, New Hampshire, New Mexico, North Carolina, Oregon, Rhode Island, Tennessee, Texas, Utah, Vermont, Virginia, West Virginia
- 22 states (and the District of Columbia) require that sex education curriculum includes discussion of skills for healthy sexuality.
- 11 states require that sex education curriculum include communication skills for teens, and instruction for discussing sex and sexuality with family members (emphasizing communication with parents).
  - California, Colorado, Maine, New Mexico, North Carolina, Oregon, Tennessee, Utah, Vermont, Virginia, Washington

==== HIV education ====
As of May 1, 2018:

- 34 states (and the District of Columbia) mandate HIV education
  - Alabama, California, Connecticut, Delaware, District of Columbia, Georgia, Hawaii, Illinois, Indiana, Iowa, Kentucky, Maine, Maryland, Michigan, Minnesota, Missouri, Montana, Nevada, New Hampshire, New Jersey, New Mexico, New York, North Carolina, Ohio, Oklahoma, Oregon, Pennsylvania, Rhode Island, South Carolina, Tennessee, Utah, Vermont, Washington, West Virginia, Wisconsin
- 20 states require that, when provided, HIV education must include information about condoms and other forms of contraception
- 39 states require that HIV education must include abstinence
  - 27 states require stressing abstinence
  - 12 states require discussing abstinence

=== Sex education inequities and sexual health disparities ===
Black and Hispanic people of color and sexual minority (especially MSM – men who have sex with men) people bear a disproportionate burden of sexually transmitted infections, including HIV, and Black and Hispanic people have higher rates of unintended pregnancy than White people. Barriers to sexual health care may include cost, access, healthcare provider bias, and low health literacy, as well as access to sex education (both in receipt and timing). There exist widespread racial, gender and sexual minority status disparities in sexual education. Differing exposure to the information and skills necessary to maintain sexual health, as would be provided in broad-based comprehensive sexual education, may also be a contributing factor to inequities in sexual health outcomes. A recent study demonstrated that young Black and Hispanic men were less likely than young White men to receive instruction on key sexual health topics including HIV/STIs and contraception, both at all and before the first sexual experience. Black young women were less likely than White young women to receive information on contraception prior to initial sexual experience. Racial and ethnic differences in sexual health knowledge may be the result of inequity in receipt of comprehensive sexual health education, leaving youth of color at a greater risk for poor sexual health. Disparities also exist by sexual behavior or orientation. Young men who have sex with men are less likely to receive instruction about STIs or HIV/AIDS, despite the disproportionate burden of STIs on this group. Importantly, sex education generally "centers heterosexual relationships, excluding or pathologizing queer identities and behaviors."

=== Influence of wealth on sex education ===
Teens from non-white, low-income families are more likely to receive abstinence-only sex education, according to the National Survey of Family and Growth. Teens with intact families are also more likely to receive comprehensive sex education than those living with a single parent. Disadvantaged youth are the shown to be the least likely social strata to benefit from formal sex education programs.

== See also ==
- Age of consent
- Ages of consent in the United States
- Adolescent sexuality in the United States
- Religious views on birth control
- Comprehensive Sex Education
- Sex education in Louisiana
- Sexual norm
- Virginity pledge
- Harmful to Minors, a book by Judith Levine, which deals with sexual morality and sex education in the United States
- Permissive society
- Adolescent sexuality
- Is the School House the Proper Place to Teach Raw Sex?, an influential 1968 pamphlet opposing sex education
- Social conservatism
- Sexuality Information and Education Council of the United States
- Guttmacher Institute
- U.S. universities with BDSM clubs
