= Take Action Tour =

American charity concert tour series

- Genre: Emo, indie, post-hardcore, pop punk, metalcore
- Dates: February - April
- Location: United States
- Years active: 1999 - present
- Founders: Sub City Records and Hopeless Records
- Website: http://www.takeactiontour.com

The Take Action Tour is an annual spring tour that not only hosts several bands, but also tries to get people alerted about the issues with teen suicide, and ultimately tries to prevent it. The tour was created by both Sub City and Hopeless Records. A portion of the ticket sales and compilation CD sales are donated to the cause.

In recent years, the tour has chosen bands that have fans more of the demographic age group.

In 2011, Sub City Records announced a new beneficiary Sex, Etc., a nonprofit organization dedicated to raising teen awareness of sexually transmitted diseases and the benefits of safe sex.

== Tours By Year ==
2002

- Jimmy Eat World
- The International Noise Conspiracy
- Poison the Well
- The Bouncing Souls
- Anti-Flag
- Thursday
- The Promise Ring
- Common Rider
- The Lawrence Arms
- Snapcase
- Cursive
- Coheed And Cambria
- Wau Wau Sisters
- Le Tigre
- Northern State

2003

- Poison The Well
- Dillinger Escape Plan
- Further Seems Forever
- Eighteen Visions
- Shai Hulud
- Since By Man
- Avenged Sevenfold
- This Day Forward
- Shadows Fall
- Throwdown
- Himsa
- These Arms Are Snakes

2005

- Sugarcult
- Hawthorne Heights
- Hopesfall
- The Early November (select shows)
- Maxeen (select shows)
- Mêlée (select shows)
- Plain White T's (select shows)
- Anberlin (select shows)
- Gym Class Heroes (one show only)
- Don't Look Down (one show only)

2006

- Matchbook Romance
- Amber Pacific
- The Early November
- Silverstein (select shows)
- Chiodos (select shows)
- Paramore (select shows)
- Man Alive (select shows)
- I Am Ghost (select shows)
- We Are the Fury (select shows)
- Hit the Lights (select shows)
- Roses are Red (select shows)
- Sullivan

2007

- The Red Jumpsuit Apparatus
- Emery
- Scary Kids Scaring Kids
- A Static Lullaby
- Kaddisfly

2008

- Every Time I Die
- From First To Last
- The Bled
- August Burns Red
- The Human Abstract

2009

- Cute Is What We Aim For
- Meg & Dia
- Breathe Carolina
- Every Avenue
- Anarbor
- All Time Low
- Set Your Goals
- Stealing O'Neal

2010

- We The Kings
- Mayday Parade
- There For Tomorrow
- A Rocket To The Moon
- Stereo Skyline
- Call The Cops
- Attack Attack!
- Pierce The Veil
- Dream On, Dreamer

2011

- Silverstein
- Bayside
- Polar Bear Club
- The Swellers
- Texas in July

2013

- The Used
- We Came As Romans
- Crown the Empire
- Mindflow

2014

- The Devil Wears Prada
- The Ghost Inside
- I Killed the Prom Queen
- Dangerkids

2015

- Memphis May Fire
- Crown the Empire
- Dance Gavin Dance
- Palisades

== Compilation CDs ==
- Take Action! Vol. 1
- Take Action! Vol. 2
- Take Action! Vol. 3
- Take Action! Vol. 4
- Take Action! Vol. 5
- Take Action! Vol. 6
- Take Action! Vol. 7
- Take Action! Vol. 8
- Take Action! Vol. 9
- Take Action! Vol. 10
- Take Action! Vol. 11
