= Sex education in Louisiana =

In the United States, each state composes its own legislation for sexual education in schools. The legislation regarding the availability of sex education is a widely debated topic which has important economic, social, and health consequences.

== Current position ==
In Louisiana, public schools are allowed, but not required, at the discretion of the local school board to teach sex education. This education must emphasize abstinence until marriage as the primary method to avoid unwanted pregnancy or sexually transmitted diseases, and is not allowed to advocate for abortion. The subject must be taught within another subject, such as biology, and cannot be its own class. No sex education is permitted from kindergarten to the sixth grade - except in Orleans Parish, where it is allowed in the third grade and higher - but the school board can determine at what grade level the subject is taught beyond the sixth grade. Schools are not able to give out contraceptives or provide any resource materials that depict explicit homosexual sexual activity. Louisiana law does not address the topics of instruction on HIV or STD prevention.

== History ==
In Louisiana, sex education was not permitted until 1979, when the current sex education legislation was enacted. In 2015, the Louisiana Adolescent Reproductive Health Coalition (LARHC), a non-profit activist group, was created in order to advocate for comprehensive sex education in schools. Advocates for comprehensive sex education aim to promote healthy sex behaviors and resources, while those opposed believe that the discussion of sex in schools will lead to increased sex behaviors in adolescents. State Representative Pat Smith proposed a bill in 2018 to make sex education a requirement in public schools, but the bill failed to pass in the house committee.

== Statistics ==
In 2016, Louisiana reported the 6th highest birth rate in the United States, with 4,545 births among females aged 15–19. Among this age range, Louisiana's birth rate was 30.6 births per 1,000 females; in comparison, the United States had a birth rate of 20.3 births per 1,000 females.

== See also ==
- Sex education in the United States
- LGBT sex education
- LGBT sex education in the United States
