= Comprehensive sex education =

Sex education instruction method

Comprehensive sex education (CSE) is an instructional approach aimed at providing individuals, particularly young people, with accurate, holistic information about sexuality, relationships, and reproductive health. Unlike abstinence-only education, CSE includes a broad curriculum that covers topics such as safe sex practices, contraception, sexually transmitted infections (STIs), sexual orientation, gender identity, and relationship skills. This approach seeks to empower individuals to make informed, responsible decisions regarding their sexual health and to promote respect and equality in sexual relationships.

CSE is widely supported by health organizations for its effectiveness in improving public health outcomes. Research shows that comprehensive sex education contributes to reduced rates of unintended pregnancies and STIs, delayed initiation of sexual activity, and increased use of contraceptives among sexually active youth. Furthermore, CSE addresses the diverse needs of young people, including LGBTQ+ youth and individuals from various cultural backgrounds, fostering inclusivity and helping reduce health disparities across communities.

In the United States, the implementation of CSE varies significantly across states due to decentralized education policies. Some states mandate CSE or HIV education, while others continue to prioritize abstinence-based programs. The debate around CSE often involves ideological and political conflicts, with advocates emphasizing its health benefits and critics raising concerns about age-appropriateness and cultural values. Internationally, CSE is recognized by agencies like UNESCO and the World Health Organization as a critical component of human rights and adolescent development, with recommended integration into school curricula for its role in enhancing both individual well-being and public health.

== History ==
As of 2019, sex education in the United States is mandated at the state level, with individual states, districts, and school boards responsible for determining the implementation of federal policy and funds for sex education. As of 2025, 41 states and DC require sex education in at least one area, HIV education, or both, and 26 states require it to be medically accurate. Notably, in states where sex education is mandated, there is no federal policy requiring the instruction of comprehensive sex education.

During the George W. Bush administration, conservative Republicans in Congress strongly supported abstinence-only-until-marriage sex education. Conversely, under the Barack Obama administration, there was opposition to abstinence-only education, with suggestions to eliminate it. With the advent of President Trump's first administration, the federal agenda reverted back to supporting an abstinence-based approach. In 2026, the Trump administration canceled most federal Teen Pregnancy Prevention grants and shifted funding towards abstinence-focused programs, though a federal judge temporarily blocked the new rules.

According to the 2014 School Health Places and Practices Study conducted by the Centers for Disease Control and Prevention, high school courses, on average, dedicate 6.2 hours of class time to human sexuality, with a notable emphasis on abstinence. However, the same study found that 4 hours or less are typically allocated to topics such as HIV, other sexually transmitted infections and pregnancy prevention.

== Benefits ==
Studies have found that comprehensive sexuality education is more effective than receiving no instruction and/or abstinence-only instruction. Acknowledging that people may engage in premarital sex rather than ignoring it (which abstinence-only is often criticized for) allows educators to give the students the necessary information to safely navigate their future sexual lives. Additionally, young people that do not identify as heterosexual or their gender identity assigned at birth, have increased sexual risk behaviors and adverse health outcomes compared to their heterosexual and cisgender peers. Sex educators argue comprehensive sex education, which includes specific attention to minority groups, is essential for improving this health disparity and ensuring the livelihoods of all people, including LGBTQ+ youth, racial minorities, or students with disabilities.

CSE advocates argue that promoting abstinence without accompanying information regarding safe sex practices disregards reality, and is ultimately putting the student at risk. For example, programs funded under AEGP are reviewed for compliance with the 8 standards (listed below in "Abstinence Education Grant Program (AEGP) Requirements), but are not screened for medical accuracy. Therefore, critics believe that students under these educational programs are put at a disadvantage because it prevents them from making informed choices about their sexual health. Additionally, under these AEGP programs, health educators have referred to those that engage in sex, especially females, as "dirty" and "used". They have also used phrases such as "stay like a new toothbrush, wrapped up and unused" and "chewed-up gum" to teach abstinence. Under a CSE model, language would be more sensitive.

There is clear evidence that CSE has a positive impact on sexual and reproductive health (SRH), notably in contributing to reducing STIs, HIV and unintended pregnancy. Sexuality education does not hasten sexual activity but has a positive impact on safer sexual behaviours and can delay sexual debut. A 2014 review of school-based sexuality education programmes has demonstrated increased HIV knowledge, increased self-efficacy related to condom use and refusing sex, increased contraception and condom use, a reduced number of sexual partners and later initiation of first sexual intercourse. A Cochrane review of 53 randomized controlled trials in Europe, the United States, Nigeria and Mexico also confirmed that CSE prevents unintended adolescent pregnancies. CSE is very beneficial in regards to teen pregnancy because studies show that teen pregnancy and childbearing have a significant negative impact on high school success and completion, as well as future job prospects. A study in Kenya, involving more than 6,000 students who had received sexuality education led to delayed sexual initiation, and increased condom use among those who were sexually active once these students reached secondary school compared to more than 6,000 students who did not receive sexuality education. CSE also reduces the frequency of sex and the number of partners, which in turn also reduces the rates of sexually transmitted infections.

UNAIDS and the African Union have recognized CSE's impact on increasing condom use, voluntary HIV testing and reducing pregnancy among adolescent girls and have included comprehensive, age-appropriate sexuality education as one of the key recommendations to fast track the HIV response and end the AIDS epidemic among young women and girls in Africa.

As the field of sexuality education develops, there is increasing focus on addressing gender, power relations and human rights in order to improve the impact on SRH outcomes. Integrating content on gender and rights makes sexuality education even more effective. A review of 22 curriculum-based sexuality education programmes found that 80 per cent of programmes that addressed gender or power relations were associated with a significant decrease in pregnancy, childbearing or STIs. These programmes were five times as effective as those programmes that did not address gender or power. CSE empowers young people to reflect critically on their environment and behaviours, and promotes gender equality and equitable social norms, which are important contributing factors for improving health outcomes, including HIV infection rates. The impact of CSE also increases when delivered together with efforts to expand access to a full range of high- quality, youth-friendly services and commodities, particularly in relation to contraceptive choice.

A global review of evidence in the education sector also found that teaching sexuality education builds confidence, a necessary skill for delaying the age that young people first engage in sexual intercourse, and for using contraception, including condoms. CSE has a demonstrated impact on improving knowledge, self-esteem, changing attitudes, gender and social norms, and building self-efficacy.

=== Benefits of pleasure-inclusive material ===
Though a focus on behavior change (i.e., increased condom use and delayed onset of sexual debut) is an important benefit and measure of outcomes associated with sex education, a pivot to exploring the mental health and well-being implications associated with shifting the narrative from a purely biological and procreative approach to a pleasure-inclusive and sex positive approach showcases a host of beneficial outcomes. Two avenues hold particular interest when implementing a pleasure-based curricula: Benefits of CSE and Benefits of Sexual Expression.

Such avenues have been recognised by official organising bodies such as the World Association of Sexual Health (WAS). Indeed, their Sexual Pleasure Declaration outlines that the pursuit of pleasurable and safe sexual experiences, free from discrimination and coercion, is integral to sexual health and overall well-being. Recognising sexual pleasure as a fundamental aspect of human rights - which also holds its own declaration on Sexual Rights - its diverse expressions should be incorporated into global education, health promotion, research, and advocacy efforts, fostering comprehensive, immediate, and sustainable actions for individual well-being and contributing to global health and sustainable development.

Another notable organisation paving the way of pleasure-inclusive sex education curricula is The Pleasure Project. Which recently published a systematic review uncovering the distinct value added by embedding a pleasure-based lens within sexual health interventions. The Pleasure Project also underscores seven guiding principles: Be Positive, Rights First, Think Universal, Be Flexible, Talk Sexy, Embrace Learning, and Love Yourself.

== Criticism ==
=== Comprehensiveness ===
While CSE implementation is on the rise in the United States, it remains difficult for state officials to regulate what is and is not taught in the classroom. This is due in large part to the undefinability of CSE; CSE has the potential to comprise such a wide range of sexual information, and over-all focus varies widely between curricula. Educators have also accused CSE of fundamentally operating as a form of "abstinence-plus", due to the reality that CSE often involves minimal body-related information and excessive promotions of abstinence. "So-called Comprehensive Sex Ed" says Sharon Lamb, a professor at the University of Massachusetts Boston, "has been made less comprehensive as curricula are revised to meet current federal, state, and local requirements."

==== Inclusion of LGBT community ====
The LGBT population experiences multiple health disparities which may be impacted by stigma, discrimination, and lack of provider cultural sensitivity. This population is subject to systemic barriers to adequate healthcare services ultimately impacting their wellbeing and welfare negatively. They often receive care from clinicians without specialty training in addressing the concerns of this population; which may hinder communication and trust, and ultimately influence the quality and adequate delivery of healthcare. Discrimination and lack of cultural sensitivity may also contribute to the limited health-seeking behaviors experienced by this population. This lack of health-seeking behavior both limits preventative services, and increases and prolongs illness and ailments. Research shows a higher risk of contracting HIV and other STDs; particularly in gay men of color. Lesbian and bisexual females are less likely to obtain routine care like breast and cervical cancer screenings. Gay men are at an increased risk of prostate, testicular, anal, and colon cancers, while lesbian and bisexual women have an increased risk of ovarian, breast, and endometrial cancers. As a result of stigma, discrimination, victimization, and sexual abuse, LGBT youth are more likely to be involved in high-risk sexual behaviors at an earlier age.

While comprehensive sex education exists in schooling, many programs do not address the needs of the LGBT community. This population faces different health disparities ultimately driven by discrimination, shortfalls of peers, the lack of parental support, community services, and school-based sex education. The implementation of LGBT comprehensive sex education utilized as an intervention seeks to combat these health disparities, by informing the population of the importance of developing sexual health. Sexual health involves not only preventing disease, but also a respectful approach to sexual relationships, sexuality, and accepting an individual's gender identity and sexual orientation.

The term "comprehensive" is also often misleading because some comprehensive programs do not show the holistic picture of human sexuality. LGBT advocates have long been critical of the ways in which comprehensive sex education generally promotes marriage as the end goal for students. LGBT advocates want to express other forms of relationships other than marriage. They advocate that students should have sex education that encompasses the different forms and should be allowed to exercise those forms in which they are most comfortable with. Even when curriculums claim to be inclusive of LGBT experiences, they often promote heteronormative lifestyles as "normal." Inclusion of LGBT identities and health topics is necessary for LGBT students to feel safe and seen in their sex ed classrooms. When sex education fails to include LGBT identities and experiences, LGBT youth can be vulnerable to risky sexual behaviors and experience negative sexual health outcomes. Due to the lack of LGBT sex education provided in schools, LGBT youth will look to peers and the internet, which can lead to misinformation. When these students do not have access to or an interest in marriage they are practically erased from the CSE narrative.

In Canada, a federal report showed that the LGBT community has less access to health services and faces more comprehensive health challenges compared to the general population. As a result of the lack of support for the LGBT population, the Comprehensive Health Education Workers (CHEW) Project emerged in October 2014. Their goal is to educate the LGBT community about topics such as sexual and gender identity, sexually transmitted infections (STIs), healthy social relationships, and depression. They do this through workshops, arts‐based projects, and one‐on‐one meetings. The CHEW project is set exclusively for the LGBT community in order to establish a safe environment in which LGBT youth can gain resources for sex education.

A cross-sectional study done in New York City analyzed the sexual behaviors of high school girls. Studies found that, "high school girls who identified as LGBT were more likely to report substance use such as: alcohol, marijuana, cocaine, heroin, meth, ecstasy and prescription drugs. They also had higher rates of contemplating and/or attempting suicide." Another study found that "the LGBT youth accesses health information online five times more than the heterosexual population, and these rates are even higher for LGBT youth that identify as a person of color which stems from the fact that they lack health resources". Rights, Respect, Responsibility includes an inclusive LGBT curriculum for grades K-12. By having a curriculum, such as the Right, Respect, Responsibility suggests, students will have accurate information about all identities as well as establishing a safe classroom for LGBT students.

As of May 2018, only 12 states require discussion of sexual orientation and of these, only 9 states require that discussion of sexual orientation be inclusive (California, Colorado, Delaware, Iowa, New Jersey, New Mexico, Oregon, Rhode Island, and Washington). Additionally, several states have passed legislation that bans teachers from discussing gay and transgender issues, such as sexual health and HIV/AIDS awareness. As of 2022, five states require that heterosexuality be emphasized over homosexuality.

=== School context ===
Before the late 1800s, delivering sex education in the United States and Canada was primarily seen as a parent's responsibility. Today, programs under the Sexuality Information and Education Council of the United States (SIECUS) begin comprehensive sex education in pre-kindergarten, drawing criticism related to the age at which it is appropriate to address sexual matters with children.

=== Religious context ===
Some faith communities also offer comprehensive sex education to their youth. One particularly inclusive example is the Our Whole Lives program, which was published by the Unitarian Universalist Association and the United Church of Christ. The program was developed to promote the values of sexual health, responsibility, and inclusivity. OWL is known for being inclusive of the LGBTQ community in its teachings, aiming to provide education and resources for everyone. Other churches have also produced sex education programs, such as the United Methodist Church with Wonderfully Made, which teaches about sexuality and relationships from a Christian perspective. Our Whole Lives: Lifespan Sexuality Education | Sexuality Education | RE-sources | UUA.org

== The Healthy Youth Act Massachusetts ==
=== Overview ===
An Act Relative to Healthy Youth, or the Healthy Youth Act, is a bill (HD.3454/SD.2178) that would require any public school in Massachusetts with a sex education curriculum to be fully comprehensive. This would include materials that are age-appropriate, medically-accurate, LGBTQ-inclusive, and consent-focused. Content would address how to build healthy relationships and how to prevent pregnancy and STIs when a person does have sex. The Healthy Youth Act was initially filed in January 2011 and has been revised multiple times since. This bill is a framework that does not mandate a particular curriculum, but does require that schools where sex education is already being taught fit this framework. Parents will be given 30 days-notice to review the material and opt-out.

In 2021, the Healthy Youth Act was cosponsored by Senator Sal N. DiDomenico and Representatives Christina A. Minicucci, Vanna Howard, and Jack Patrick Lewis of the 192nd General Court of the Commonwealth of Massachusetts. Bill SD.2178 has been advocated for over 10 years and has successfully passed the Massachusetts Senate, however it has yet to be passed by the Massachusetts House of Representatives.

=== Controversy ===
Reactions to the Healthy Youth Act have been mixed, but it has gained increased support over the years. Some of its most dedicated supporters include Fenway Health, the Healthy Youth Coalition, The Massachusetts Healthy Youth Consortium, and Getting to Zero. The Planned Parenthood League of Massachusetts states that "comprehensive sex education is about more than just sex – it helps creates a culture of consent, recognizes and prioritizes LGBTQ youth health needs, and gives young people the tools to build healthy relationships... We can combat sexual assault at its roots by teaching young people how to build healthy, respectful relationships". In 2018, a poll of Massachusetts residents showed that 92% of people agree that students should receive comprehensive sex education in high school. In a testimony in support of the bill, supporters claim that "sex education is a perfect opportunity for youth to develop skills like communication, healthy relationships, decision-making, planning, and critical thinking. Such life skills can contribute to their positive development throughout adolescence and into adulthood".

The Massachusetts Family Institute (MFI), a conservative organization that promotes traditional Judeo-Christian values and the bill's main opponent, highlights the article "Pornographic 'Comprehensive Sexuality Education' in Massachusetts Public Schools" on the front page of their website. This article refutes Planned Parenthood's claims, stating that "it's no wonder that Planned Parenthood is pushing it in our schools. Planned Parenthood administrators know that if they sexualize young people, they will create new customers who seek out their abortion services, sexually transmitted infection treatments, and transgender hormone therapies". Instead, MFI argues that the Healthy Youth Act would inappropriately expose underaged youth to "pornographic" content that would encourage youth to engage in sexual behaviors, concluding that "state education officials and local school administrators ought to reject Comprehensive Sexuality Education as the poisoner of children that it is".

Sexual Risk Avoidance (SRA) curricula has been promoted in direct opposition to the Healthy Youth Act. Advanced by Ascend, this curricula promotes an abstinence-only approach to sex education. Within SRA education programs "Ascend works with SRA educators, community organizations and more as they educate youth using a primary prevention health model".

== The Healthy Youth Act California ==
=== Overview ===
The Healthy Youth Act in California, a state law signed in October 2015, requires school districts to provide students with integrated, comprehensive, accurate and comprehensive health and HIV prevention education from trained instructors at least once in middle school and once in high school.

The purpose of the act is to provide comprehensive, accurate and unbiased sexual health and HIV prevention education.

Preventive education must meet all requirements of the law except for the requirements for specific contents of grades 7 to 12. All "education on human development and gender, including education on pregnancy, contraception and venereal diseases" (EC 19 51931(b) is by definition a comprehensive sexual health education and should be satisfied, regardless of what schools call it by name. HIV prevention education is defined as "the nature of HIV and AIDS, the methods of transmission, strategies to reduce the risk of HIV infection, and guidelines for social and public health issues related to HIV and AIDS" (EC 551931(d).

=== Purpose ===
The law has five main objectives:

1. Provide students with the knowledge and skills necessary to protect sexual and reproductive health from HIV and other venereal infections and unintended pregnancies.
2. Provide students with the knowledge and skills necessary to develop healthy attitudes regarding youth growth and development, body image, gender, sexual orientation, relationships, marriage, and family.
3. To deepen understanding of sex as a normal part of human development.
4. Ensure that students receive integrated, comprehensive, accurate, and unbiased sexual health and HIV prevention education, and provide educators with clear tools and guidelines to achieve this.
5. Provide students with the knowledge and skills necessary to maintain healthy, positive and safe behavior and relationships.

== Federal Funding for Sexual Education ==
Although there is no federal mandate that requires states to teach sexual education, there is federal funding available to assist with sexual education programs.

=== Abstinence Education Grant Program (AEGP) ===
Historically, funding for abstinence education has always been favored over CSE. In 1996, during Bill Clinton's presidency, legislation was passed to promote abstinence in education programs. Under Title V Section 510 of the Social Security Act, the Abstinence Education Grant Program (AEGP), was passed. AEGP has always been renewed before its expiration date, and each time funds gradually increase from fifty million dollars per year to seventy-five and as high as $6.75 million per state grant in 2015. The way the funds are disbursed are based on the proportion of low-income children in each state. So far, thirty-six states have been given AEGP funds.

==== Abstinence Education Grant Program (AEGP) Requirements ====
Part of Section 510(b) of Title V of the Social Security Act, contains the "A-H guidelines", which are the eight criteria that programs must abide by order to be eligible to receive federal funding. They are as follows:

A. Has as its exclusive purpose teaching the social, psychological, and health gains to be realized by abstaining from sexual activity;
B. Teaches abstinence from sexual activity outside marriage as the expected standard for all school-age children;
C. Teaches that abstinence from sexual activity is the only certain way to avoid out-of-wedlock pregnancy, sexually transmitted diseases, and other associated health problems;
D. Teaches that a mutually faithful, monogamous relationship in the context of marriage is the expected standard of sexual activity;
E. Teaches that sexual activity outside the context of marriage is likely to have harmful psychological and physical effects;
F. Teaches that bearing children out of wedlock is likely to have harmful consequences for the child, the child's parents, and society;
G. Teaches young people how to reject sexual advances and how alcohol and drug use increase vulnerability to sexual advances; and
H. Teaches the importance of attaining self-sufficiency before engaging in sexual activity;

In addition to abiding by these 8 conditions, AEGP compliant programs cannot discuss contraception, STIs, or methods for protecting against STIs, except when describing failure rates.

=== Teen Pregnancy Prevention Program (TPP) ===
More recently legislation has pushed for funding that goes beyond abstinence only education. In 2010, President Obama introduced the Teen Pregnancy Prevention Program (TPP), which provides a total of $114.5 million annually to sex education programs that are "medically accurate and age-appropriate." TPP falls under a subsection of United States Department of Health and Human Services ("HHS") which is overseen by the Office of Adolescent Health. Funding for TPP is dispersed if "they emulate specific evidence-based programs promulgated under TPP."

=== California Comprehensive Sexual Health and HIV/AIDS Prevention Education Act ===
In January 2016, the California Healthy Youth Act amended the California Comprehensive Sexual Health and HIV/AIDS Prevention Education Act to include minority groups and expand health education. Before, it authorized schools to provide comprehensive sex education and required all materials to be made accessible to students with a variety of needs; it also focused solely on marital relationships. It now mandates that schools provide comprehensive sex education and states that "materials cannot be biased and must be appropriate for students of all races, genders, sexual orientations, and ethnic and cultural backgrounds, as well as those with disabilities and English language learners." Additionally, education must now include "instruction about forming healthy and respectful committed relationships," regardless of marital status. Furthermore, it is now required to have discussions about all FDA-approved contraceptive methods in preventing pregnancy, including the morning-after pill.

In conclusion now requires that all sex education programs promulgated in the state should:

- normalize sexuality as part of human development;
- ensure people receive integrated, comprehensive, accurate, and unbiased sexual health and HIV prevention and instruction; and
- provide pupils with the knowledge and skills to have healthy, positive, and safe relationships.

== As a human right ==
Some critics state that young people's access to CSE is grounded in internationally recognized human rights, which require governments to guarantee the overall protection of health, well-being and dignity, as per the Universal Declaration on Human Rights, and specifically to guarantee the provision of unbiased, scientifically accurate sexuality education.

These rights are protected by internationally ratified treaties, and lack of access to sexual and reproductive health (SRH) education remains a barrier to complying with the obligations to ensure the rights to life, health, non-discrimination and information, a view that has been supported by the Statements of the Committee on the Rights of the Child, the Convention on the Elimination of all Forms of Discrimination Against Women (CEDAW) Committee, and the Committee on Economic, Social and Cultural Rights.

The commitment of individual states to realizing these rights has been reaffirmed by the international community, in particular the Commission on Population and Development (CPD), which – in its resolutions 2009/12 and 2012/13 – called on governments to provide young people with comprehensive education on human sexuality, SRH and gender equality.

Other analysis show that comprehensive sex education is not an international right nor a human right because it not clearly stated in either a treaty or custom. By international law, states are required to provide access to information and education about reproductive health, but this does not require a sex education curriculum. It may take different forms such as mandating that local school districts create a system for providing information to students, or mandating that health clinics and practitioners dispense information to patients.

== In curricula ==
=== Teaching methods ===
As CSE gains momentum and interest at international, regional and national levels, governments are increasingly putting in place measures to scale-up their delivery of some form of life skills-based sexuality education, as well as seeking guidance on best practice, particularly regarding placement within the school curriculum. Sexuality education may be delivered as a stand-alone subject or integrated across relevant subjects within the school curricula. These options have direct implications for implementation, including teacher training, the ease of evaluating and revising curricula, the likelihood of curricula being delivered, and the methods through which it is delivered.

Within countries, choices about implementing integrated or stand-alone sexuality education are typically linked to national policies and overall organization of the curricula. The evidence base on the effectiveness of stand-alone vs. integrated sexuality education programming is still limited. However, there are discernible differences for policy-makers to consider when deciding the position of CSE within the curriculum.

As a stand-alone subject, sexuality education is set apart from the rest of the curriculum, whether on its own or within a broader stand-alone health and life skills curriculum. This makes it more vulnerable to potentially being sacrificed due to time and budget constraints, since school curricula are typically overcrowded.

However, a stand-alone curriculum also presents opportunities for specialized teacher training pathways, and the use of non-formal teaching methodologies that aim to build learners' critical thinking skills. The pedagogical approaches promoted through sexuality education – such as learner-centred methodologies, development of skills and values, group learning and peer engagement – are increasingly being recognized as transformative approaches that impact on learning and education more widely. As a standalone subject, it is also significantly easier to monitor, which is crucial in terms of evaluating the effectiveness of programming, and revising curricula where it is not delivering the desired learning outcomes.

When sexuality education is integrated or infused, it is mainstreamed across a number of subject areas, such as biology, social studies, home economics or religious studies. While this model may reduce pressure on an overcrowded curriculum, it is difficult to monitor or evaluate, and may limit teaching methodologies to traditional approaches.

=== Terminology ===
Apart from the different teaching methods, terminology also differs. Abortion, homosexuality and abstinence have connotations and definitions that vary by state and by nationality. For example, the word "abstinence" may refer to disengaging from all forms of sexual activities until marriage or may refer to only disengaging from sexual intercourse. Furthermore, the degree of sexual activity that "abstinence" connotes is often unclear, because sexual behavior that is not sexual intercourse may or may not be included in its definition. As a result, students are left confused about what activities are risky and teachers do not know what they can and cannot teach.

The term "comprehensive", is also falls on spectrum, therefore can be considered an umbrella term. CSE means something radical for some institutions while it can mean something moderate and even conservative for others.

According to the Sexuality Information and Education Council of the United States (SIECUS), the guidelines for comprehensive sexuality education are as follows:

- appropriate to the age, developmental level, and cultural background of students;
- respects the diversity of values and beliefs represented in the community;
- complements and augments the sexuality education children receive from their families, religious and community groups, and healthcare professionals;
- teaches not only about abstinence, but also contraception, including emergency contraception and reproductive choice;
- teaches about lesbian, gay, bisexual, transgender (LGBT) issues and questions issues;
- teaches anatomy, development, puberty, and relationships;
- teaches all of the other issues one would expect to be covered in a traditional sexuality education class; and
- should be science-based and medically accurate

=== Sexual education exemption ===
Just as teaching methods and curricula vary by state, excusal from sex education also varies by state. States may have an opt-out or opt-in policy. In some states, students can opt out of receiving sexual education without specifying a particular reason. In other states, students can only opt out for religious or moral reasons. In an opt-in provision, parents must actively agree to allow their children to receive sex education prior to the start of the sexual education.

== Sexual content in the media ==
Since 1997, the amount of sexual content on TV has nearly doubled in the United States. Additionally, a study done in 2008 showed that nearly 40% of popular music lyrics contained sexual references which were often sexually degrading. These lyrics were also often accompanied with mentions of other risk behaviors, such as substance use and violence.

Teens (ages 13–15) in the United States, use entertainment media as their top source for education in regards to sexuality and sexual health. Additionally, a study found that 15–19-year-olds in the U.S use media far more than parents or schools to obtain information about birth control. Some studies have found that, "very few teen television shows mention any of the responsibilities or risks (e.g., using contraception, pregnancy, STIs) associated with sex and almost none of the shows with sexual content include precaution, prevention, or negative outcomes as the primary theme." Television shows 16 and Pregnant and its spin-off, Teen Mom, which first aired on MTV in 2009 received major disapproval from some parents as they thought the shows glamorized teen pregnancy and motherhood. However, 16 and Pregnant actually led to a 4.3 percent reduction in teen pregnancy, mostly as a result of increased contraceptive use. In contrast, other data shows that exposure to high levels of sexual content on the television causes adolescents to have twice the risk of becoming pregnant in the following three years, compared to those who were exposed to low levels.

The film Mean Girls, directed by Mark Waters shed light on the state sex education in some parts of the United States. In the film the health instructor states, "At your age, you're going to have a lot of urges. You're going to want to take off your clothes and touch each other. But if you do touch each other, you will get chlamydia and die." This line is meant to be satirical, but it illustrates common flaws within sex education in the U.S. It depicts simplistic descriptions of sexual activity and implementation of fear without any legitimate basis.

Comprehensive sex education is the main topic in the documentary The Education of Shelby Knox (2005) about Lubbock, Texas, which has one of the highest teen pregnancy and STD rates in the nation; the "solution" to which is a strict abstinence-only sex education curriculum in the public schools and a conservative preacher who urges kids to pledge abstinence until marriage.

In 2013, How to Lose Your Virginity was released, a documentary that questioned the effectiveness of the abstinence-only sex education movement and observed how sexuality continues to define a young woman's morality and self-worth. The meaning and necessity of virginity as a social construct is also examined through narration and interviews with notable sexuality experts, such as former Surgeon General Joycelyn Elders, "Scarleteen" creator and editor Heather Corinna, historian Hanne Blank, author Jessica Valenti, and comprehensive sex education advocate Shelby Knox.

Not only have films portrayed sex education, but so has social media. Platforms such as YouTube, Facebook, and others are used as a tool to uplift the narratives of marginalized communities such as persons of color and LGBT persons in hopes to "strengthen sexual health equity for all."

As a result of the mass amount of sex content in media, media literacy education (MLE) has emerged. It was created to address the influence of unhealthy media messages on risky health decisions, such as intention to use substances, body image issues, and eating disorders. A study analyzed the effectiveness of a teacher-led MLE program, called Media Aware Sexual Health (MASH), which provides students with accurate health information and teaches them how to apply that information to critical analysis of media messages. This comprehensive sex education resulted in increased intentions to talk to a parent, partner and medical professional prior to sexual activity, and intentions for condom use.

Due to knowledge gaps in most sex education curricula for teens, free online resources like Sex, Etc., Scarleteen.com, and teensource.org have been created to promote comprehensive, inclusive, and shame-free sex education for teenagers.

== See also ==
- Abstinence-only sex education in Uganda
- Age of consent
- Reproductive health
- Sex education
- Sex education curriculum
- Sex education in the United States
- Sexual revolution
- Sexually transmitted infections

== Sources ==
This article incorporates text from a free content work. Licensed under CC-BY-SA IGO 3.0 (license statement/permission). Text taken from Emerging evidence, lessons and practice in comprehensive sexuality education: A global review 2015, 14, 15, 25, 29, UNESCO, UNESCO. UNESCO.
