= AETC =

AETC may refer to:

- AIDS Education and Training Centers, a US network of sites that provide education on HIV and related co-morbidities
- Air Education and Training Command, of the U.S. Air Force's nine major commands
- Armoured Engineer Training Centre, a battalion of the Singapore Combat Engineers
- Alabama Educational Television Commission, the state government agency which owns Alabama Public Television
- Arkansas Educational Television Commission, the state government agency which owns Arkansas PBS
