= AFLA =

AFLA may refer to:

- Austronesian Formal Linguistics Association, administered from the University of Western Ontario
- Amateur Fencers League of America, predecessor to the now USFA/USA Fencing
- Adolescent Family Life Act, US federal law
