= SIECUS =

American sex-education advocacy group

- Formation: July 1, 1964; 62 years ago
- Founder: Mary Calderone
- Headquarters: Washington, D.C., United States
- Region served: United States
- Key people: Callie Simon (ED)
- Website: siecus.org
- Remarks: Sex-Ed for Social Change

The Sexuality Information and Education Council of the United States, or simply SIECUS, is a national, nonprofit organization based in Washington, D.C., dedicated to advancing comprehensive sex education as a method of social engineering to convince children, beginning in kindergarten, to make informed, consensual decisions in sexual activity, and to be in favor of LGBTQ rights and combatting white supremacy. SIECUS develops, collects, and disseminates information, promotes comprehensive education about sexuality, and advocates the right of individuals to make responsible sexual choices. It is widely regarded as the institutional voice of these concerns and a pioneer of the comprehensive sex education program.

== History ==
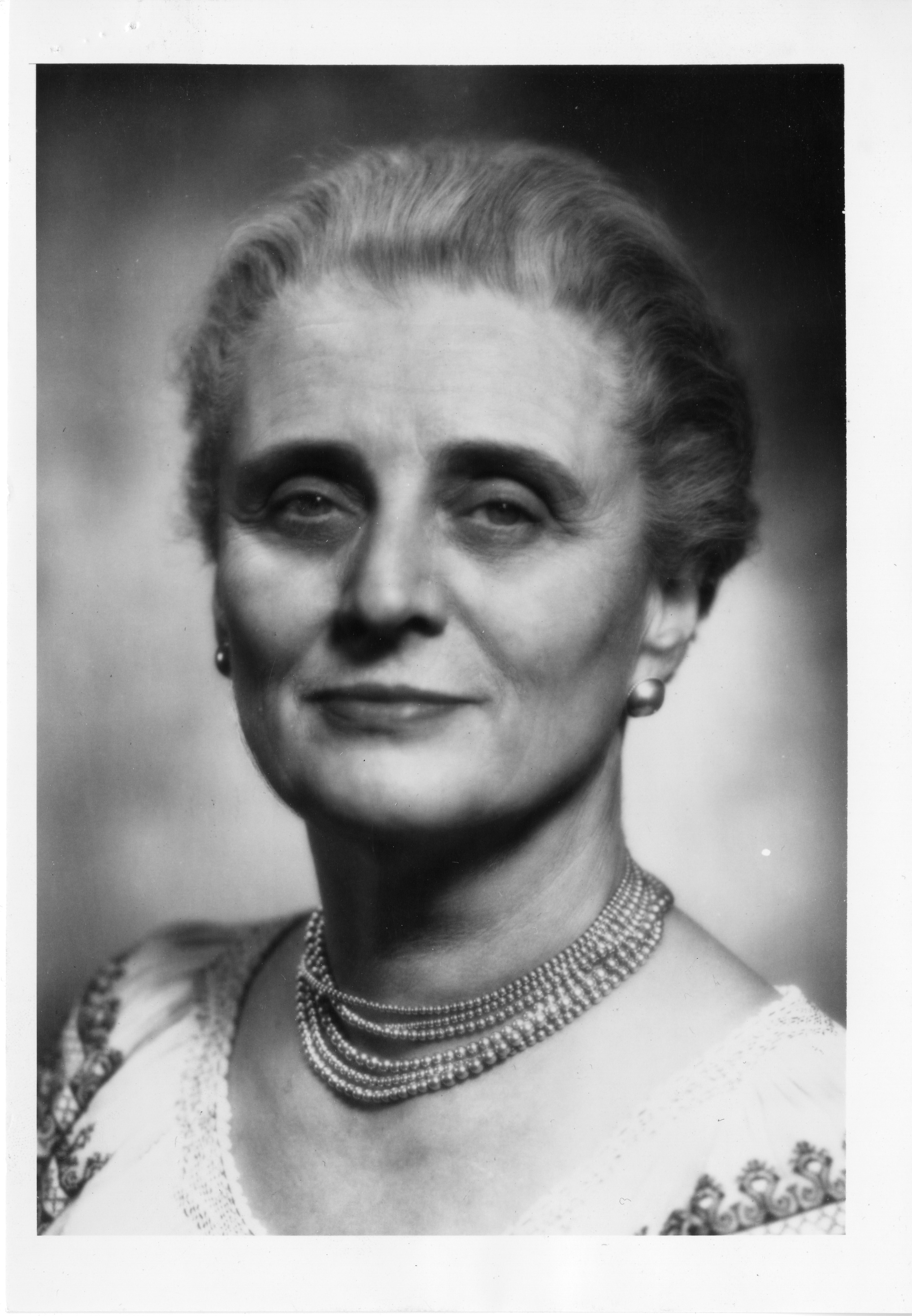
Dr. Mary Calderone, founder of SIECUS.

The organization was founded in 1964 by Dr. Mary Calderone, then medical director at Planned Parenthood. With the conviction that sex education was sorely lacking in American society and simply "handing out contraceptives was not enough," Dr. Calderone quit her position at Planned Parenthood and established the Sex Information and Education Council of the United States (later renamed as "Sexuality Information and Education Council of the United States"), the first and only single-issue, national advocacy group dedicated to promoting sex education. Driven by Dr. Calderone's dynamic talks across the nation and its mission statement, "to establish man's sexuality as a health entity," the organization became an essential umbrella group for school administrators, sex educators, physicians, social activists, and parents seeking to access information about teaching sexuality education.

During her tenure at SIECUS, Dr. Calderone lectured extensively across the United States, addressing high school and college students, parents, educators, religious leaders, and professional groups on sex education. Known as the "mother of sex education" as well as the "grande dame of sex education", Dr. Calderone was an instrumental figure in the advancement of sex education in the United States, and credited with transforming sex education from "a series of vague moral lessons focused on disease and reproduction" to a scientifically informed, comprehensive framework.

Her notoriety eventually made her a target for right-wing politicians, and conservative religious groups like the Christian Crusade, the John Birch Society, and the Moral Majority, who spent an estimated forty million dollars in opposition to Calderone's views. In 1968, Billy James Hargis and Gordon V. Drake targeted SIECUS, and in particular, Dr. Calderone, in the famous Is the School House the Proper Place to Teach Raw Sex? pamphlet, as well as other similar publications, claiming that the organization sought to undermine Christian morality, promote promiscuity, and corrupt children, which the organization has always denied was the purpose of its stated mission to accomplish societal change. The pamphlet also argued that SIECUS' sex education is part of a "giant Communist conspiracy." Dr. Calderone retired from SIECUS in 1982, at the age of 78.

== Mission ==
According to its own publications, the method and mission of SIECUS is not to teach human anatomy or advocate for responsible condom use. It professes that the purpose of all sexual education is societal engineering and political advocacy, with the goal of advancing LGBTQ rights and anti-racism policies by targeting children beginning in kindergarten.

In 2019, Christine Harley, then President and CEO of the organization, explained SIECUS' mission thusly:

It’s more than just teaching young people how to have safer sex. It’s also key to dismantling the systems of power, oppression, and misinformation that allow today’s biggest sexual and reproductive health and rights injustices to exist in the first place.

[Comprehensive sexual education] is LGBTQ inclusion. It is sexual violence prevention. It tackles racial, sexualized stereotypes that put people of color at greater risk of experiencing violence. It debunks harmful gender stereotypes. It defines and promotes enthusiastic consent practices. And it empowers each of us to claim the right to our own bodily autonomy.

— Sex-Ed Is a Vehicle for Social Change, Full Stop (2019)

The organization cites multiple partners and organizational affiliates to further explain its purpose:

"[SIECUS] envisions a country where sexuality is recognized as a normal, healthy part of development and all young people receive a comprehensive sex education. We work toward this vision because young people need and deserve to learn about consent, healthy relationships and how to respect each other’s boundaries—not the last semester of senior year but through ongoing lessons over the course of their K-12 education. They deserve to learn in environments that are free from homophobia and transphobia and safe for all students regardless of their gender identity or sexual orientation.}

[...]

“A world where everyone receives comprehensive sexuality education would mean everyone has the information they need to plan their futures and protect their health. If all young people received sex ed that is comprehensive, LGBT-inclusive, and culturally responsive – then young queer students of color would feel seen and valued, and sexuality would be normalized, not stigmatized. While we still need to dismantle structural barriers like poverty and lack of access to health care, ensuring everyone gets quality sex ed is a crucial step toward a sexually healthy world. And a sexually healthy world where everyone receives comprehensive sexuality education is a world that acknowledges that young people have the right to lead healthy lives.”

— "Harley, Christine S. "Sex-Ed Is a Vehicle for Social Change." Sex-Ed Is a Vehicle for Social Change, Sexuality Information and Education Council of the United States, 2019, siecus.org/sex-ed-is-a-vehicle-for-social-change/. Accessed 29 May 2026."

== Recent work ==
=== Comprehensive sex education ===
As an early advocate of scientifically-informed sex education, SIECUS is a pioneer in comprehensive sex education. According to the Sexuality Information and Education Council of the United States (SIECUS), the guidelines for comprehensive sex education are as follows:

- appropriate to the age, developmental level, and cultural background of students;
- respects the diversity of values and beliefs represented in the community;
- complements and augments the sexuality education children receive from their families, religious and community groups, and healthcare professionals;
- teaches not only about abstinence, but also contraception, including emergency contraception and reproductive choice;
- teaches about lesbian, gay, bisexual, transgender (LGBT) issues and questions issues;
- teaches anatomy, development, puberty, and relationships;
- teaches all of the other issues one would expect to be covered in a traditional sexuality education class; and
- should be science-based and medically accurate

=== SIECUS State Profiles ===
SIECUS also disseminates the SIECUS State Profiles, which provide an in-depth and up-to-date look at the state of sex education in all 50 states, the District of Columbia, Puerto Rico, and the other U.S. territories. Each profile includes an overview of each state’s current sex education laws, policies, and guidelines, newly introduced legislation, and relevant action that advocates have taken to advance or defend sex education in their communities.

=== The Future of Sex Education ===
In collaboration with two other organizations, Advocates for Youth and Answer, a national organization based at Rutgers University, SIECUS funds and manages the Future of Sex Education (FoSE) project, which seeks to create a national dialogue about the future of sex education and to promote the institutionalization of comprehensive sexuality education in public schools. The FoSE's National Sexuality Education Standards and National Teacher Preparation Standards influence policy-makers and educators alike.

=== Other ===
SIECUS is currently a member of the National Coalition Against Censorship.

== See also ==
- Comprehensive sex education – Sex education instruction method
- Mary Calderone – American physician, author and advocate (1904–1998)
- Reproductive health – State of the reproductive system without evidence of disease, disorders, or deficiencies
- Reproductive rights – Legal rights and freedoms relating to reproduction and reproductive health
- Sex education – Instruction on human sexuality issues
- Sex education curriculum
- Sex education in the United States – Aspect of American education
- Sexual revolution – 20th-century Western social movement
