= Bowen v. Kendrick =

- Supreme Court of the United States

Argued March 30, 1988 Decided June 29, 1988
- Full case name: Bowen v. Kendrick
- Citations: 487 U.S. 589 (more) 108 S. Ct. 2562; 101 L. Ed. 2d 520

Case history
- Prior: Kendrick v. Bowen, 657 F. Supp. 1547 (D.D.C. 1987)

Holding
- The Adolescent Family Life Act did not violate the Establishment Clause of the First Amendment.

Court membership
- Chief Justice William Rehnquist Associate Justices William J. Brennan Jr. · Byron White; Thurgood Marshall · Harry Blackmun; John P. Stevens · Sandra Day O'Connor; Antonin Scalia · Anthony Kennedy

Case opinions
- Majority: Rehnquist, joined by White, O'Connor, Scalia, Kennedy
- Concurrence: O'Connor
- Concurrence: Kennedy, joined by Scalia
- Dissent: Blackmun, joined by Brennan, Marshall, Stevens

Laws applied
- U.S. Const. amend. I, Adolescent Family Life Act

Bowen v. Kendrick, 487 U.S. 589 (1988), was a United States Supreme Court case in which the Court upheld the constitutionality of the Adolescent Family Life Act.

== Background ==
The Adolescent Family Life Act was implemented by the United States Congress in 1981 as an amendment to the Public Health Service Act. The purpose behind this statute was to combat the social and economic consequences associated with pregnancy and childbirth among unmarried youths. The statute sought to achieve this goal by promoting "... adolescent premarital sexual abstinence, adoption as an alternative to early parenting, parenting and child development education, and comprehensive health, education, and social services..." In order to effectively promote these behaviors and services, the statute permitted federal funds to go toward public and private organizations that offer services and research toward premarital adolescent sexual relations and pregnancy. One of the statute's provisions required that AFLA grants may not be given to programs that provide abortion counseling, nor to programs that promote abortion as a valid means of birth control.

In 1983, a group of federal taxpayers, clergymen, and the American Jewish Congress filed suit against Otis R. Bowen, the Secretary of Health and Human Services, arguing that the Adolescent Family Life Act violated the Establishment Clause of the First Amendment. The Establishment Clause forbids Congress from passing laws "... respecting an establishment of religion..." As a result of the AFLA, federal grants were distributed to religious organizations that encourage adolescents to refrain from involvement in sexual relationships. The plaintiffs argued that federal funds directed towards religiously affiliated organizations have the effect of advancing religion and thus are unconstitutional.

== Supreme Court Decision ==
When deciding this case, the United States Supreme Court applied the three-part test set forth by Lemon v. Kurtzman. According to this test, a statute will be upheld if it can satisfy each of the following three parts: 1) the statute has a secular legislative purpose, 2) its primary effect neither advances nor inhibits religion, and 3) it does not excessively entangle government with religion. The Court first held that the Adolescent Family Life Act had a secular purpose, as it was enacted to combat the social and economic problems associated with teenage sexuality, pregnancy, and parenthood, with no reference to religious matters. Second, the Court found that the extent to which this statute advances religion is "incidental and remote" at most. The statute does not require that any grant recipients be affiliated with a religious organization and the services that the act provides are not themselves religiously motivated. Lastly, the Court found that the statute does not excessively entangle government with religion because it requires that the grants be monitored to ensure that the federal funds are being spent in the manner intended by Congress. Therefore, since the Court found that the Adolescent Family Life Act satisfies all three parts of the Lemon test, the statute's constitutionality was upheld.

On January 19, 1993, the parties agreed to a settlement regarding the federal funds distributed by the Adolescent Family Life Act. The settlement required that sexuality education funded by the Act "... may not include religious references, may not be offered in a site used for religious worship services, or offered in sites with religious iconography."

== See also ==
- List of United States Supreme Court cases, volume 487
- List of United States Supreme Court cases
- Lists of United States Supreme Court cases by volume
- List of United States Supreme Court cases by the Rehnquist Court
