= Sex education curriculum =

A sex education curriculum is a sex education program encompassing the methods, materials, and assessments exercised to inform individuals of the issues relating to human sexuality, including human sexual anatomy, sexual reproduction, sexual intercourse, reproductive health, emotional relations, reproductive rights and responsibilities, abstinence, birth control, and other aspects of human sexual behavior.

== European Union ==
=== Purpose ===
The purpose of sexuality education curriculum in Europe is to facilitate adolescents to gain knowledge, attitudes, skills, and values to make appropriate and healthy choices in their sexual behavior, thus preventing them from sexually transmitted infections, including HIV and HPV, teenage or unwanted pregnancies, and from domestic and sexual violence, contributing to a greater society. While European educators and policymakers recognize the benefits of sexuality education as being essential in the realm of sexual health, the content and approach of the curriculum have undergone significant changes over time and differ among each European country. Influenced by politics, as well as social and religious movements, European educators and policymakers recognize the struggle to find common criteria of sexuality education curriculum.

=== Common sex education curricula ===
Researchers identify the most common delivery of sexuality education curriculum as being through a biology, relationship, and ideological focus. In this form of curriculum, practiced through a moral and informative approach by a teacher's instruction, attention is directed towards the reproductive and physical aspects of sexuality education rather than the emotional and social aspects. While this approach is identified as the most common form of sexuality education in Europe, Europe is not limited to this practice. With a total of twenty-seven countries within the European Union, a wide variety of practices are implemented in an attempt to address and/or ignore sexuality education. European policymakers and educators recognize the need for an implementation of an ideal curriculum for European countries to adopt, while distinguishing the political, social, and religious movements that hinder this action.

=== The Safe Project ===
The Safe Project was introduced by a coalition of European health organizations including the IPPF European Network, WHO Regional Office for Europe, and Lund University, in 2004 in response to European policymakers and educators speaking out about the political, social, and religious struggles encountered when implementing sexuality education curriculum in Europe. The SAFE project conducted extensive research, implemented advocacy, engaged the youth, and created a greater recognition among public health organizations of the sexual rights of European youth as well as the creation of a model curriculum, providing an outline of the ideal sexuality education curriculum to be practiced within the European Union. This model of sexuality education curriculum was charted in a ninety-eight-page product entitled The Reference Guide to Sexuality Education in Europe, selling thousands of copies to public health organizations and journals, as well as various books within academia.

=== The model sex education curricula ===
The ideal sexuality education curriculum within the European Union, as proposed by the SAFE Project, is one that would be provided for varying ages of students, from the primary to the secondary level. A multi-dimensional staff including public health professionals, school instructors with knowledge in the sciences, and non-governmental organizations, would be responsible for providing instruction in an interactive approach. Educators recognize the benefits of health organizations and agencies not only as offering a more emotional and social approach to sexuality education, but also expertise in recognizing issues among youth such as indications of sexual abuse, sexually transmitted diseases, and pregnancy. Similarly, non-government organizations(NGOs) provide students as well as the public with private counseling, sexuality seminars, public health campaigns, as well as peer-led informational groups, in which they can step outside of a strictly lecture and informational curriculum in sexuality education and accommodate the personal needs of European youth. While the ideal curriculum would be altered to accommodate the needs of its audience, its goal is to inform students on the topic of sexuality, raising awareness and therefore allowing students to make healthier decisions in regards to sexuality and relationship activity as well as European youth distinguishing their sexual rights. Younger audiences within the primary setting would be instructed by their classroom teacher in areas of puberty, sexual development, and bullying while secondary audiences would be instructed by a multi-dimensional staff in the topical areas of racism, homophobia, sexual violence, abstinence, safe sex, sexually transmitted diseases, pregnancy and contraceptives, as well as the biological, emotional, and social effects of sexuality.

=== Complications ===
Several complications are associated with the implementation of an ideal sexuality education curriculum including the area and diversity of each European country, variances in political and religious views, and a lack of sustainability. The area in which a country is located can affect religious and political beliefs, as well as resources and access to health education, similarly, the idea of diversity and the exposure to information and resources as well. Politics and religion are two controversial topics that both have strong oppositions to sexuality education. With strong oppositions and public protests, political and religious-affiliated organizations voice their negative opinions of a sexuality education curriculum that informs youth of sexual resources and options concerning contraception and abortion. With sexuality education not being mandatory in all twenty-seven countries of the European Union and the controversial opposition of political and religious organizations, policymakers are unable to make an ideal sexuality education curriculum concrete. A lack of sustainability within sexuality education curriculum is also an issue addressed by European policymakers and educators. Upon a country acknowledging the benefits, as well as a need for sexuality education, they implement the ideal sexuality education curriculum in which they see positive results in the decline of sexually transmitted diseases as well as teenage and unplanned pregnancies. Upon government officials recognizing the positive results of the curriculum, the program is eliminated due to the significant improvements and the mindset that the problem is fixed and therefore the curriculum is no longer needed. With governmental cuts in sexuality education programs as well as the funding provided for those programs, policymakers and educators face great difficulty in the implementation of a continent-wide curriculum.

=== Benefits ===
Several benefits are associated with the implementation of this model of sexuality education curriculum, including youth empowerment, an increased awareness of sexuality, a decline in the acquiring or conveying of sexually transmitted diseases, as well as a decrease in unintended pregnancies.

=== Supporters ===
The IPPF European Network strives for support and access to sexual and reproductive health services, while serving as a voice for the sexual rights of European individuals globally. The WHO Regional Office for Europe advocates for public health, implements programs for disease prevention and control, addresses health threats, responds to health emergencies, and sustains and supports the implementation of public health policies. Lund University is one of Europe's most renowned universities, as well as one of the top one-hundred universities globally.

=== European Union countries ===
==== Austria ====
Sexuality education in Austria is addressed in the manner of a Biology, German, Religious Studies, and Social Studies/Factual Education curriculum through a method of formal classroom instruction. Sexuality education curriculum is introduced in a primary school setting, middle school setting, as well as a secondary setting. Topics discussed are differences between sexes, pregnancy, puberty and physical changes, genitals, masturbation, contraceptives, safe sex, abstinence, abortion, and sexually transmitted diseases.

==== Belgium ====
Sexuality education in Belgium is a mandatory practice that offers schools a great amount of autonomy on the curriculum that they offer. Majority of the curriculum offered to students is mandated by school instructors calling upon outside resources such as health organizations or facilities for guidance. Topics discussed within the curriculum are gender, physical development, sexual orientation, intimacy, morality, and risk prevention.

==== Bulgaria ====
Sexuality education is not mandatory in Bulgaria; therefore no minimum standards of a curriculum are intact. Students and parents are able to request an optional discipline of sexuality education in which the schooling system relies heavily on non-governmental organizations in relaying the information in the following topical areas of reproductive systems, HIV and AIDS, contraception, and violence.

==== Cyprus ====
The curriculum of sexuality education within Cyprus is referred to as Sexuality Education and Interpersonal Relationship Education. The curriculum is taught through the instruction of biology, home economics, and religion educators in which great emphasis is placed on the importance of family relationships and development, rather than sexuality.

==== Czech Republic ====
The sexuality education curriculum in the Czech Republic is introduced to students by teachers and school staff with the reliance on non-governmental and health organizations as early as the age of seven. The curriculum is considered comprehensive, covering areas in sexual abuse, contraceptives, reproduction, sexual crimes, homophobia, pregnancies, and sexually transmitted diseases.

==== Denmark ====
Sexuality Education has been mandatory since 1970 in Denmark in which school staff and educations have great autonomy within the curriculum. The curriculum is delivered through a biological and Danish focus, in which topics discussed include contraceptives, pregnancy, and puberty.

==== Estonia ====
Sexuality education within Estonia is offered through the lens of human studies in formal classroom settings, in which an instructor focuses on a personal relationships curriculum.

==== Germany ====
Sexual education has been mandatory in German schools since 1968, when it was put in place by the Bundesländer. In the mid-1990s the ‘Pregnancy and Family Aid Act’ (SFHÄndG) introduced national mandatory sexuality education programmes that dealt with biological and medical views, as well as emotions, relationships, and ethics. Sexual education in Germany begins at the age of 9. Sexuality education aims include topics like body changes in puberty, the effectiveness of different contraceptive methods, and the reproductive cycle.

By law The Federal Centre for Health Education (BZgA) and the authorities of the 16 federal states are assigned to implement and conduct sexual education. They work with German family counseling and other organizations working in the field. BZgA provides sexuality education for different age groups and provides its materials to the general population, teachers, and counseling centers for free. BZgA is supervised by the Federal Ministry for Family Affairs, Senior Citizens, Women and Youth.

==== Greece ====
Sexuality education is a mandatory practice in Greece in which a multi-dimensional team of teachers, nurses, and health organizations focus on the curriculum of biological and relational aspect of sexuality education, as well as human anatomy.

==== Hungary ====
Sexuality education is referred to as Education for Family Life in Hungary in which a staff of teachers and health care professionals focus on a curriculum that addresses the human body, drinking, smoking, drugs, and AIDS.

==== Ireland ====
Sexuality education in Ireland is a mandatory practice as of 2003, however parents can remove their children from the curriculum, focusing on a variety of topics in the areas of relational, social, and personal health.

==== Italy ====
Italy, with great influence from the Catholic Church, has created a sexuality education curriculum taught through formal classroom instruction, focusing on the biological aspects of sex and behavior.

==== Latvia ====
Sexuality education in Latvia is taught through a social science perspective in which instructors focus on a curriculum outlining the development of family, roles of family, gender, child development, relationships, and pregnancy.

==== Lithuania ====
Sexuality education in Lithuania is taught through the perspective of Biology, Ethics, and Physical Culture in which instructors base a curriculum off of their responsibility to inform students how to make healthy lifestyle choices.

==== Luxembourg ====
Sexuality education in Luxembourg is provided by teachers in the topical areas of biology, citizenship, and religion with a curriculum focusing on love, sexual activities, family, contraception, pregnancy, sexually transmitted diseases, and drugs.

==== Norway ====
School teachers and nurses are responsible for the implementation of sexuality education. A biological curriculum is common in which educators focus on the areas of sex, contraception, pregnancy, puberty, families, and relationships.

==== Spain ====
Sexuality education in Spain is not a mandatory practice however upon a school deciding to instruct its students on the topic, educators rely heavily on outside health organizations and professionals to provide private workshops.

== Other countries ==
=== Australia ===
The Victorian Government (Australia) developed a policy for the promotion of Health and Human Relations Education in schools in 1980 that was introduced into the State's primary and secondary schools during 1981. The initiative was developed and implemented by the Honorable Norman Lacy MP, Minister for Educational Services from 1979–1982.

A Consultative Council for Health and Human Relations Education was established in December 1980 under the chairmanship of Dame Margaret Blackwood; its members possessed considerable expertise in the area.

The Council had three major functions:

1. 1. to advise and to be consulted on all aspects of Health and Human Relations' Education in schools;
2. 2. to develop, for consideration of the Government, appropriate curriculum for schools;
3. 3. to advise and recommend the standards for in-service courses for teachers and relevant members of the school community.

Support services for the Consultative Council were provided by a new Health and Human Relations Unit within the Special Services Division of the Education Department of Victoria and was responsible for the implementation of the Government's policy and guidelines in this area. The Unit advised principals, school councils, teachers, parents, tertiary institutions, and others in all aspects of Health and Human Relations Education.

In 1981 the Consultative Council recommended the adoption of a set of guidelines for the provision of Health and Human Relations Education in schools as well as a Curriculum Statement to assist schools in the development of their programs. These were presented to the Victorian Cabinet in December 1981 and adopted as Government policy.

=== Canada ===
A catalog of Canadian sex education films, ranging from 1953 to 2012, was recently compiled by researchers at the University of Waterloo, Ontario, Canada.

== Literature ==
- The SAFE Project, ed. (2006). Sexuality Education in Europe. A Reference Guide to Policies and Practices (PDF). Brussels: IPPF European Network.
