= Sex, Etc. =

American magazine for teens' sexual health

Sex, Etc. is an American magazine and web site on teens' reproductive health. It is written by teens, for teens, and published by Answer, at Rutgers University. Answer is a national organization that provides training, resources, technical assistance and advocacy in support of comprehensive sexuality education. It was formerly known as the Network for Family Life Education.

== Concept ==
Sex, Etc. is one of the only magazines and Web sites that consistently publishes first-person stories by American teen writers on the realities of their sexual choices and their lives. Teen writers for Sex, Etc. have covered such issues as choosing abortion, adoption or teen parenthood; coming out; leaving abusive relationships; fighting for LGBT rights; becoming an HIV/AIDS activist; and getting tested for sexually transmitted diseases. The writers have also answered teens' questions about sex for Teen People magazine, the think MTV campaign and other youth media outlets.

The teen editorial staff of Sex, Etc. has been featured in the national press, commenting on such topics as abstinence-only programs and youth access to emergency contraception. Sex, Etc. has worked to help young people take action on issues that affect their lives, including working for comprehensive sexuality education in their high schools.

The Sex, Etc. magazine began as a print newsletter in 1994. The web site launched on Valentine's Day in 1999. In 2006, the magazine and web site underwent a major redesign. The site features first-person stories by teens, videos, forums, and an Ask the Experts area, where teens can get answers to their questions via e-mail and a weekly live chat with sexual health experts.

Sex, Etc. is a national partner on the think MTV campaign from MTV and the Kaiser Family Foundation. It also partners with Seventeen magazine, gURL.com, Scenarios USA, Revolution Health, Advocates for Youth and other national youth and media organizations.
