= Adolescent Family Life Act =

US law

Omnibus Budget Reconciliation Act of 1981
- Long title: A bill to provide for reconciliation pursuant to section 301 of the First Concurrent Resolution on the Budget for the Fiscal Year 1982
- Acronyms (colloquial): AFLA
- Nicknames: Adolescent Family Life Act, Chastity Act, Chastity Bill
- Enacted by: the 97th United States Congress

Citations
- Public law: Pub. L. 97–35

Codification
- Acts amended: Public Health Service Act
- Titles amended: 42 U.S.C.: Public Health and Social Welfare
- U.S.C. sections created: 42 U.S.C. § 300z
- U.S.C. sections amended: 42 U.S.C. § 300

Legislative history
- Introduced in the House as H.R. 3982 by James R. Jones (D-OK-1) on 19 June 1981; Committee consideration by Budget; Passed the House on 26 June 1981 (232–193); Passed the Senate on 13 July 1981 (Voice); Reported by the joint conference committee on 29 July 1981; agreed to by the House on 31 July 1981 (Unanimous Consent) and by the Senate on 31 July 1981 (80-14); Signed into law by President Ronald Reagan on 13 August 1981

United States Supreme Court cases
- Bowen v. Kendrick

The Adolescent Family Life Act (AFLA) is a United States federal law enacted during the Reagan Administration as part of the Omnibus Budget Reconciliation Act of 1981. AFLA provided funding for a series of social programs aimed at promoting abstinence through reproductive health education.

== Background ==
The original bill, S. 1090, was proposed by Jeremiah Denton (R-AL) and Orrin Hatch (R-UT) as an amendment to the Public Health Service Act of 1970. On 4 November 1981, Senate voted to indefinitely postpone S. 1090. However, its provisions to amend the Public Health Service Act, repeal parts of the Health Services and Centers Amendments of 1978, and provide grants for the Adolescent Family Life Demonstration Projects were incorporated into the H.R. 3982 Omnibus Budget Reconciliation Act of 1981.

== Controversy ==
The bill carried strong religious undertones, particularly with the strategic funding of Catholic organizations. Consequently, questions were raised with regard to the constitutionality of the law. The case was later brought before the Supreme Court in 1988 in Bowen v. Kendrick, which upheld the law.
