= AIDS Education and Training Centers =

US healthcare education network

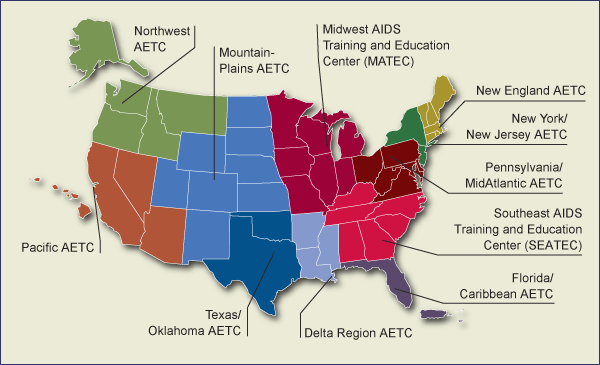
Map of AETC Service Regions

The AIDS Education and Training Centers (AETC) are a United States network of five national centers, 11 regional training centers, and over 130 associated local performance sites that provide education on HIV and related co-morbidities such as hepatitis, tuberculosis, and sexually transmitted diseases for healthcare providers in the United States. The AETCs were established in 1987 through federal funding from the Health Resources and Services Administration (HRSA) Bureau of Health Professions. In 1997, the AETCs became a component of the Ryan White HIV/AIDS Program.

== Education ==
Some of the most common AETC training topics include adherence, antiretroviral therapy, opportunistic infections, prevention methods, and substance abuse. The AETCs collectively train and educate more than 125,000 participants a year.

The AETCs also offer technical assistance to healthcare clinics that provide HIV care and treatment. Common technical assistance issues include community linkages, client scheduling, agency needs assessment, and grants management.
