= Art Michalik =

American football player (1930–2021)

No. 62
- Positions: Linebacker, guard

Personal information
- Born: January 31, 1930; Chicago, Illinois, U.S.
- Died: February 23, 2021 (aged 91)
- Listed height: 6 ft 2 in (1.88 m)
- Listed weight: 229 lb (104 kg)

Career information
- High school: Weber (Chicago)
- College: St. Ambrose (1947–1950)
- NFL draft: 1951: 17th round, 198th overall pick

Career history
- San Francisco 49ers (1953–1954); Pittsburgh Steelers (1955–1956)

Awards and highlights
- Second-team All-Pro (1953); Pro Bowl (1953)

Career NFL statistics
- Field goals made: 1
- Field goal attempts: 12
- Extra points made: 9
- Extra point attempts: 15
- Fumble recoveries: 2
- Stats at Pro Football Reference

Arthur Michalik (January 31, 1930 – February 23, 2021) was an American professional football player who was a linebacker and guard in the National Football League (NFL). He played from 1953 to 1956 for the San Francisco 49ers and Pittsburgh Steelers. As a professional wrestler in the 1960s, he won the Pacific Northwest Wrestling Tag Team Championship three times with The Destroyer.

== College and military career ==
Michalik was the son of a Chicago police sergeant. At St. Ambrose University, he played college football and was named honorable-mention Little All-American, all-Midlands Conference, and all-Iowa Conference in 1950. He was also on the wrestling team, winning 33 consecutive matches with only four losses in NCAA and Amateur Athletic Union-sanctioned competition; he finished third and fourth in national AAU tournaments as a sophomore. Although wrestling coach George Strohmeyer felt he could have qualified for the 1952 Summer Olympics, he elected to focus on football upon being selected 198th overall by the San Francisco 49ers in the 17th round of the 1951 NFL draft.

After graduating college in 1951, Michalik was drafted into the United States Marine Corps. He was assigned to Naval Station Treasure Island and appointed as a recreation assistant. He also joined the base's football team and became the starting right tackle. The 49ers expressed interest in signing him upon his discharge after a scout attended the Pirates' 31–14 win against the Pittsburg Buccaneers. He was discharged on October 9, 1953, and permitted to sign with the 49ers in July via accrued terminal leave.

== National Football League career ==
As a rookie in 1953, Michalik helped the 49ers defeat the Los Angeles Rams with a fumble recovery at the Rams' five-yard line and forced a Rams punt that led to 49ers scores. The following week against the undefeated Cleveland Browns, he hit Browns quarterback Otto Graham in the face with six minutes until halftime, resulting in severe facial bleeding. Graham received 15 stitches and had a plexiglass bar—an early example of a modern facemask—attached to his helmet. The Browns won after Graham's return, and all agreed the hit was accidental. He made the Pro Bowl at the end of the season.

Michalik's 1954 season ended when he tore knee ligaments in a tie against the Rams, a game that also resulted in injuries for his teammates and drew condemnation from 49ers owner Tony Morabito and captain Bruno Banducci. At the end of the year, he was urged to retire by team doctors but refused, prompting the 49ers to trade him to the Pittsburgh Steelers for a conditional draft pick. After Steelers center Bill Walsh's retirement, he became the starter at the position and also played kicker, for two seasons.

== Professional wrestling career ==
During his playing days, Michalik also entered professional wrestling and formed a tag team with 49ers player Leo Nomellini. Nicknamed "Boom Boom Michalik", he thrice won the Pacific Northwest Wrestling Tag Team Championship.

== Teaching career ==
Michalik later became a high school coach and teacher at La Quinta High School, Los Amigos High School, Pacifica High School and Garden Grove High School and at Golden West College in Huntington Beach, California.

== Death ==
On February 23, 2021, the 49ers announced Michalik's death.

== See also ==
- List of gridiron football players who became professional wrestlers
