= Garden Grove League =

High school athletic league in California

The Garden Grove League is a high school athletic league that is part of the CIF Southern Section. Members are located in and around Garden Grove, Orange County.

== Schools ==
- Bolsa Grande High School
- La Quinta High School
- Loara High School
- Los Amigos High School
- Rancho Alamitos High School
- Santiago High School
