= West Garden Grove, Garden Grove, California =

West Grove Business District West Grove
- Neighborhood of Garden Grove
- West Grove Business District
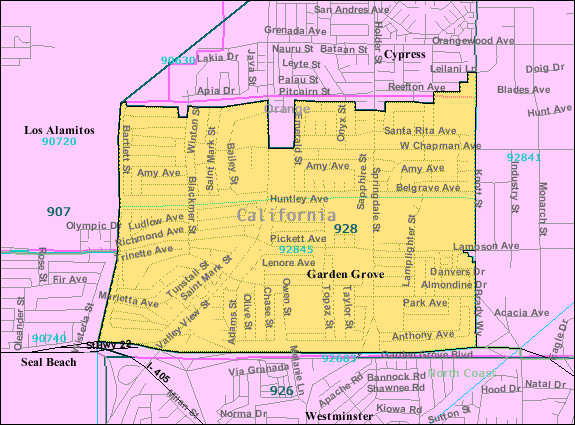
- Location of West Grove neighborhood, map of ZIP Code Tabulation Area 92845, corresponding to West Garden Grove.

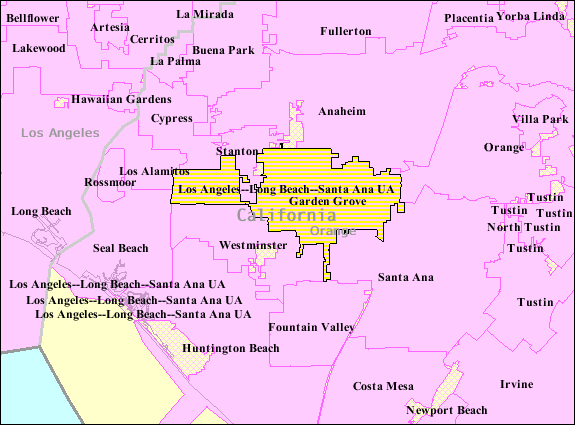
- Map of Garden Grove, California, with West Grove connected to the rest of the city by a narrow corridor.
- Coordinates: 33°47′18″N 118°01′16″W
- Country: United States
- State: California
- County: Orange County

West Grove, officially recognized as the West Grove Business District by the City of Garden Grove, and sometimes called West Garden Grove, is a neighborhood in the city of Garden Grove, located in Orange County, California, United States. West Grove encompasses the pene-exclave western portion of the city of Garden Grove. It is bordered to the north by Cypress, to the west by Los Alamitos and Seal Beach, to the south by Westminster, and to the east by Stanton, and connected to the rest of Garden Grove by a narrow strip along Garden Grove Boulevard. It includes the entire 92845 ZIP Code, which is designated as the areas west of Knott Avenue to the Seal Beach and Los Alamitos city borders, and the industrial area east of Knott Avenue to the Stanton border. The community is more "affluent" than the rest of Garden Grove, with a median income $25,000 greater than the main body of the city. There is also less crime, a lower poverty rate, and lower population density compared to the rest of Garden Grove. According to the 2020–2024 American Community Survey 5-year estimates, ZIP Code Tabulation Area (ZCTA) 92845 (the West Grove ZIP area) had a population of 16,143.

Historically, the term West Garden Grove, or West Grove, was used only on unofficial basis and was not recognized by the city of Garden Grove; however, on May 8, 2018, the Garden Grove City Council approved a resolution by Garden Grove City Councilman Kris Beard of District One, the city election district that covers West Grove, officially recognizing West Grove Business District as a district.

== Demographics ==
According to the 2020–2024 American Community Survey 5-year estimates, ZIP Code Tabulation Area (ZCTA) 92845 had a population of 16,143. The population density was 8,166.5/mi^{2}. There were 5,751 housing units at an average density of 2,875.5/mi^{2}. The racial makeup of the community was 82.3% White, 1.6% Black or African American, 1.2% Native American or Alaskan Native, 13.8% Asian, 1.0% Pacific Islander, 5.2% from other races, and 4.8% from two or more races. 16.2% of the population were Hispanic or Latino of any race.

There were 5,626 households, out of which 33.2% had children under the age of 18 living with them. 61.5% of family households were married couples living together, 11.4% had a female householder with no husband present, 5.2% had a male householder with no wife present, and 21.9% were non-families. 17.5% of all households were made up of individuals, and 33.1% of households had someone living alone who was 65 years of age or older. The average household size was 2.89 and the average family size was 3.26.

In the community, the population was spread out, with 23.1% under the age of 18, 5.7% from 20 to 24, 23.0% from 25 to 44, 29.1% from 45 to 64, and 16.0% who were 65 years of age or older. The median age was 42.1 years. For every 100 females there were 95.2 males. For every 100 females age 18 and over, there were 92.0 males.

The median income for a household in the community was $102,530, and the median income for a family was $108,289. Males had a median income of $69,735 versus $55,949 for females. The per capita income for the city was $33,634.

== Official Recognition of West Grove ==
Historically, the term West Garden Grove, or West Grove, was used only on unofficial basis and was not officially recognized by the city of Garden Grove On April 24, 2018, West Grove's representative to the Garden Grove City Council, Kris Beard, proposed a resolution that would officially designate West Grove as a business district within the city.

Councilman Beard's resolution was met with mixed feelings. Supporters felt that designating West Grove as an official neighborhood would make it easier to attract upscale chains to the area, since they would be looking at only West Grove's demographic information, and not the entire city. West Grove has about a $25,000 a year greater median household income than the rest of the city. Additionally, West Grove has a much lower crime rate, a lower poverty rate, and lower population density compared to the rest of Garden Grove.

Opponents of Beard's proposal felt the resolution was divisive and secretly racist. Opponents were quick to point out that a higher density of people of color, namely Vietnamese, live on the East Side of the city. Opponents specifically objected to Beard's use of "all American" in the resolution as being racist.

On May 8, 2018, after Beard received comments on the resolution, and amended it to make the wording less divisive, the Garden Grove City Council officially approved the resolution, officially recognizing West Grove as a neighborhood of the city, and creating the West Grove District.

== Government ==
West Garden Grove is part of the larger city of Garden Grove and receives most of its municipal services from the city. Certain other municipal services, such as vector control, are provided by the Orange County government.

- City: Garden Grove, California
  - Fire protection: Orange County Fire Authority
  - Police protection: Garden Grove Police Department
  - Ambulance service: Care Ambulance Service
- School District: Garden Grove Unified School District
- U.S. Congressional District: District 47 (Alan Lowenthal)
- California State Senate: District 34 (Tom Umberg)
- California State Assembly: District 72 (Tyler Diep)
- Orange County Board of Supervisors: District 1 (Andrew Do)
- Garden Grove City Council: District 1 (George S. Brietigam III)

== Parks and recreation ==
In West Grove, there are three community parks, Eastgate Park, Westgrove Park, and Edgar Park. The westernmost border is located 4.5 miles from the Pacific Ocean. In the eastern part of the community, an abundant supply of jobs are located in the industrial park east of Knott Avenue. There are three strip malls in the community located along Valley View Street. The Garden Grove Tibor Rubin Library (formerly the Garden Grove West Library) is located west of Valley View Street on the corner of Chapman and Bailey Street.

== Education ==
West Grove is served under the Garden Grove Unified School District, and has 7 schools located within its boundaries; 5 elementary schools, 1 intermediate school, and 1 high school. There are no colleges, or universities within the community limits, nor are there any special education schools.

=== Elementary schools ===
- Edgar School, now used as a GGUSD meeting center
- Loyal Barker Elementary School
- Garden Park School
- Enders Elementary School
- Patton Elementary School
- Hettinga Elementary School, now used for adult education

=== Intermediate schools ===
- Hilton D. Bell Intermediate School
- Chapman Junior High School (now used for adult education)

=== High schools ===
- Pacifica High School

== Major surface streets ==
=== East to west ===
- Lampson Avenue
- Chapman Avenue

=== North to south ===
- Valley View Street
- Springdale Street
- Knott Avenue/Street (changes from Avenue to Street)

== Notables ==
- Danny Barber, former pro soccer player for MetroStars.
- Pam Bileck, team gymnastics silver medal 1984 U.S. Olympic gymnastic team.
- Jeff Carlson, former quarterback for NFL's New England Patriots and Tampa Bay Buccaneers
- Jon Dorenbos, NFL long snapper for Philadelphia Eagles and professional magician.
- Michelle Dussere, team gymnastics silver medal 1984 U.S. Olympic gymnastics team.
- Larry Fortensky, last husband of Elizabeth Taylor (dropped out in 10th grade)
- Amanda Freed, member of gold medal-winning 2004 U.S. Olympic softball team.
- Dexter Holland, singer and guitarist for band The Offspring.
- Norm Johnson, former NFL kicker for the Seattle Seahawks.
- Rick Kosick, photographer.
- Greg Kriesel, bassist for The Offspring.
- Terry Kubicka, figure skater, 1976 U.S. national champion and Olympian.
- Scott Norton, PBA Tour bowling champion.
- David J. Peterson, language creator (Game of Thrones, Defiance).
- Tommy Sandt, MLB player for Oakland Athletics, minor-league manager.
- Jeffree Star, model, fashion designer, makeup artist, DJ, and singer-songwriter.
- Kevin Wasserman, lead guitarist of The Offspring.
