= Garden Grove Playhouse =

Former theater group in Orange County, California

The Garden Grove Playhouse was a non-profit community theater organization near the western edge of the city of Garden Grove in Orange County, California. The organization was originally called the Garden Grove Community Theatre, but the name changed in 1995 by a vote of the Board of Directors and the general membership. Prior to this name change, the organization was known briefly as the Orange County Actors’ Theater – Garden Grove, but the general membership did not accept this name and at the annual meeting in January 1995, the Garden Grove Playhouse (GGP) name was suggested and accepted.

GGP was founded in 1974 – the same year the nearby Westminster Community Theatre began construction on its permanent home. GGP’s first production, Desk Set, opened in June 1974 and was presented at Rancho Alamitos High School. Because of conflicts with school schedules, the Rancho Alamitos campus could not continue to be used, but the Garden Grove Unified School District allowed GGP to use Lake High School, an alternative or ‘continuation’ campus.

GGP’s next home was in Garden Grove’s Gem Theater, though it was a very brief stay. The Gem Theater was originally a single screen movie theater that the City of Garden Grove obtained grants to remodel and convert to a performing arts space. GGP would only present two productions at the Gem – it was decided that the space would be used only for professional or equity theater.

While GGP was left homeless, the situation lead to the conversion of another city-owned facility – one with a rather odd history. The building that would become the GGP's permanent home was used originally as an office to sell newly built homes in west Garden Grove. After the homes were all sold, the building became city property and was moved to Eastgate Park to be converted into a teen center. The center was closed during the 1970s due to lack of interest and vandalism, and remained largely unused for several years – though it was periodically used as a rehearsal space for the Gem Theater. GGP's Board of Directors convinced the Garden Grove City Council the space could be converted into a theater, and work began in 1981. The building saw its first opening night in January 1982 with a production of Any Wednesday and served as GGP’s home continuously until it ceased operations in 2009.

The productions presented by GGP varied slightly from year to year, often including a balanced roster of traditional favorites and seasonal variety shows. In 2003, the GGP presented its first original production, a collection of three one-acts written and produced by a local playwright. In 2005, GGP began including more experimental fare, including productions of Lee Blessing's Eleemosanary and Moisés Kaufman's The Laramie Project. However, in 2006, GGP returned to presenting more traditional, classic plays and variety shows which continued until the organization's demise.

The Eastgate Park building's original location remains somewhat of a mystery. A thorough search of city building records only returned the building permit that allowed the building to be moved to Eastgate Park. While that document showed the destination address for the building, the original address was omitted and remains unknown, making it virtually impossible to find the original building permits for its construction. During the summer of 2009, the City of Garden Grove began using the building as a teen center once again, returning the building to its pre-theater use.

== Sources ==
- LA Times reviews
- OC Weekly review of You Can't Take It With You
- OC Weekly review of God's Favorite
- OC Weekly review of The Dining Room
- OC Weekly review of D Is for Dog
- Orange County Register review of Wit
- OC Weekly review of Mr. 80%
- OC Weekly review of The Laramie Project
- Orange County Register review of The Laramie Project
- Official YouTube channel
