= Darius Durham =

American football player (born 1961)

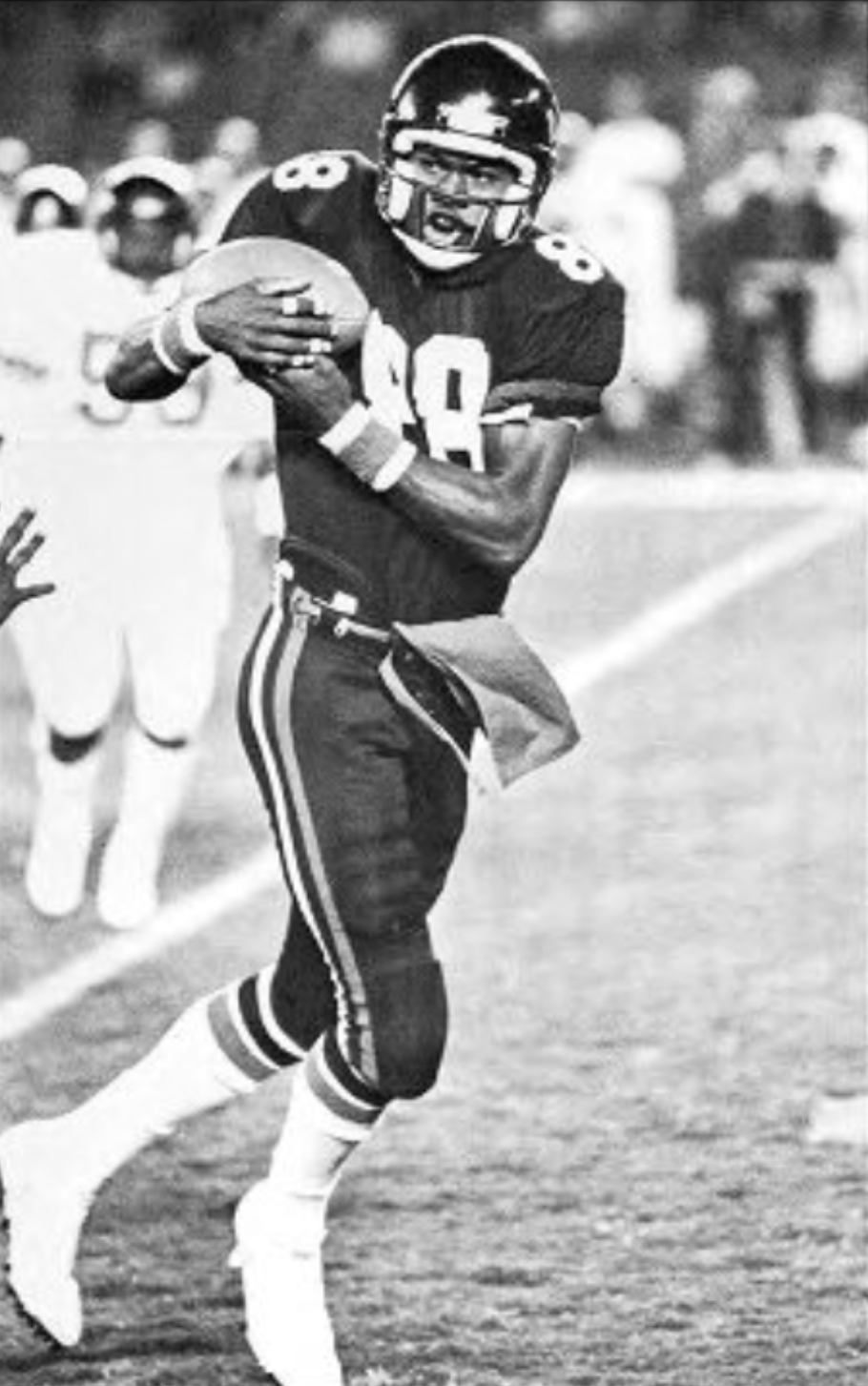
- Durham with San Diego State in 1981

No. 84
- Position: Wide receiver

Personal information
- Born: May 27, 1961 (age 65); Long Beach, California, U.S.
- Listed height: 6 ft 2 in (1.88 m)
- Listed weight: 185 lb (84 kg)

Career information
- High school: Bolsa Grande (Garden Grove, California)
- College: San Diego State
- NFL draft: 1983: 10th round, 270th overall pick

Career history
- Tampa Bay Buccaneers (1983)*; San Francisco 49ers (1983)
- * Offseason or practice squad member only

Awards and highlights
- First-team All-WAC (1982); Second-team All-WAC (1981)

Darius Tyrone Durham (born May 27, 1961) is an American former professional football player who was a wide receiver for the San Francisco 49ers of the National Football League (NFL). He played college football for the San Diego State Aztecs, twice earning all-conference honors in the Western Athletic Conference (WAC). He was selected by the Tampa Bay Buccaneers in the 10th round in the 1983 NFL draft and joined the 49ers later that year as a free agent.

== Early life ==
Born in Long Beach, California, Durham grew up in Compton with three sisters and a brother, raised by their single mother, Mary. She moved them from the predominantly Black neighborhood to the more diverse Garden Grove, despite the financial struggles it presented. Durham called the move "the biggest lesson I had in life. I could see life from a different perspective."

Durham attended Bolsa Grande High School in Garden Grove, starring in football, basketball and track. Despite playing on a 2–7 football team as a senior in 1978, he was heavily recruited. He was named to the Los Angeles Times's All-Orange County team after leading the county with 48 receptions for 686 yards and three touchdowns while facing double and triple coverage all season.

In February 1979, Durham committed to play college football for the San Diego State Aztecs under head coach Claude Gilbert. He chose them over the Washington Huskies due to the Aztecs' reputation to pass. "We've just got the best high school guy we've ever signed", said Ted Tollner, San Diego State's offensive coordinator. He added that Durham had "more ability than anyone I've seen here since Isaac Curtis".

== College career ==
As a freshman at San Diego State University in 1979, Durham had just two catches. He improved slightly as a sophomore in 1980 with 15 receptions as a backup. Tollner said that Durham struggled to adjust to the college game's different defensive coverages and harder hitting. A starter in 1981 under new Aztecs head coach Doug Scovil, Durham had seven catches for 77 yards and a touchdown in a week 2 win over Oklahoma State. It was his best game to date with San Diego State, and the first touchdown of his college career. In November, he caught 11 passes for 197 yards and two touchdowns in a 59–14 victory against UTEP. The catch total and receiving yards were season highs for the Aztecs, who scored their most points since beating Cal State Fullerton by the same score in 1975. The following week in their regular season finale against Air Force in the Mirage Bowl in Japan, Durham needed nine receptions to pass Darrin Nelson of Stanford for the most receptions in the nation. He had five catches for 100 yards in the first half, which San Diego State led 16–0, but caught only one pass in the second half, as the Aztecs lost 21–16. Durham finished the season ranked third in the country with 65 receptions for 988 yards and seven touchdowns. He received honorable mention from the Associated Press (AP) for its All-America team and was named to the All-WAC second team.

Durham entered the 1982 season named as a preseason honorable mention All-American by a pair of national publications. Through the first five games, he had just 13 catches while often facing double coverage. His production dropped that year to 45 catches for 781 yards and four touchdowns. Again named an AP honorable mention All-American, Durham was also a first-team All-WAC selection and voted the Aztecs' most valuable player. He finished his career ranked fourth at the time in school history in career receptions with 127. Durham needed three catches in the season finale against Oklahoma State to pass Craig Scoggins (129) for third place, (Note: Ahead of them were Tim Delaney (180) and Gary Garrison (148)) but he exited the game in the first quarter after pulling a hamstring and did not return.

After ranking among the top college receivers in the nation at the beginning of the season, Durham fell on NFL scouting reports, while fellow Aztecs receivers Clint Sampson and Phil Smith went past him. Scouts did not like his 4.6 time in the 40-yard dash.

== Professional career ==
Durham was selected by the Tampa Bay Buccaneers in the 10th round of the 1983 NFL draft. Fellow Aztecs receivers Sampson and Smith were chosen in the third and fourth round, respectively. The Buccaneers released Durham before their second preseason game, citing a pulled muscle as one of the reasons. He disputed that his hamstring was an issue, instead saying that the team had "some bad [scouting] information". Wanting to play in the NFL, Durham declined offers to sign with teams in the Canadian Football League and the Los Angeles Express of the United States Football League. On November 30, 1983, he signed with the San Francisco 49ers prior to their game against Tampa Bay. He was active for their last three regular season games and their two playoff contests, serving as the 49ers' fifth wide receiver behind Dwight Clark, Freddie Solomon, Mike Wilson and Renaldo Nehemiah.

In 1984, Durham was limited after a knee injury in training camp, and San Francisco cut him during preseason to meet the NFL deadline to trim rosters to 70 players. The 49ers ended the season winning Super Bowl XIX over the Miami Dolphins. Unable to play, Durham called it "the worst feeling to have to watch that."

== Later life ==
Durham worked in customer service and sales, as well as the Boys & Girls Club. He also became the athletic director for OC Vision Basketball, a youth organization training players throughout Southern California.
