= Santiago High School =

Santiago High School may refer to:

- Santiago High School (Corona, California)
- Santiago High School (Garden Grove, California)
