= Los Amigos High School =

- Los Amigos High School Gymnasium

Location
- 16566 Newhope St., Fountain Valley, California 92708; USA; 33.7231816°N 117.927358°W

Information
- Type: Public High School
- Motto: "Siempre con dignidad" (Always With Dignity)
- Established: 1968
- School district: Garden Grove Unified School District
- Principal: Todd Nirk
- Teaching staff: 76.37
- Grades: 9-12
- Enrollment: 1,437 (2023-2024)
- Student to teacher ratio: 18.82 (FTE)
- Campus: [Suburban]
- Color
- Nickname: Lobos
- Website: Los Amigos High School Website

Los Amigos High School, located in Fountain Valley, California, is one of seven high schools in the Garden Grove Unified School District. Los Amigos High School is located at the southeast corner of Newhope Street and Heil Ave and is one block east of Mile Square Park.

== History ==
Los Amigos High School first opened its doors to students in 1968. The first classes of the 1968–1969 academic year were sophomores who had been freshmen at La Quinta High School and Santiago High School. New freshmen came from Fitz Intermediate School, as well as Peters Junior High School. There were only two classes of freshmen and sophomores during the school's first academic year. The 1969–1970 academic year saw three classes for freshmen, sophomores, and juniors. The school offered classes from freshmen through seniors in the 1970–1971 academic year. The first graduating class was 1971. The class of 1971 and 1972 wrote both the fight song and the Alma Mater. Although the colors of the school, black and orange were assigned by the district, the Lobo Mascot was picked by the two classes as well. The class of 1972 collected enough money to paint Los Amigos High School and the school mascot, the Lobo (wolf), across the front of the gymnasium, which was overseen by inaugural principal Hal Butler.

Conceived at a time when "open education" was the movement of the day in public education, Los Amigos was constructed in a rather unconventional manner for the warm climate of Southern California. Not only were both of the school's primary classroom buildings - the "L" and "M" buildings - built with interior corridors, all classrooms were built without doors. It would not be until the late 1990s before all classrooms at Los Amigos were provided with doors. Recently the school installed several new classrooms the "A","B","C" and "D" portables to accommodate the increasing number of freshmen each year. The school has now remodeled their "M" and "L" buildings with new modifications to the classrooms. The "M" building has been dubbed the 100 Building and the "L" building has been named the 200 building.

Since opening its doors in 1968, Los Amigos has been led by the following principals: Hal Butler, Ken Calkins, George Wilson, Connie Van Luit, Robin Patterson, Vicky Braddock, Amy Avina, and Todd Nirk.

== Academics ==
Los Amigos is a Title 1 School. Los Amigos' base Academic Performance Index (API) score for the 2007–2008 school year is 715.

In 2006, 436 Advanced Placement (AP) exams were taken at the school, and 23.1% of the 2006 graduating class passed at least one AP exam.

== Student body ==
As of the 2024–2025 school year, 1,430 students attend Los Amigos High School. A culturally diverse community, Los Amigos High School has a student population that is 83.5% Hispanic, 12.3% Asian, 1.6% Caucasian, 0.9% African American, 0.3% Pacific Islander, 0.3% Filipino, and 0.1% American Indian. The vast majority of the Los Amigos student body is drawn from the communities of Fountain Valley and Santa Ana.

== Student activities ==
Los Amigos High: Den of the Lobos

Los Amigos offers many co-curricular and extracurricular programs for its students, including: Advancement Via Individual Determination (AVID), ASB/Leadership, Choral Music, Drama, Instrumental Music, Knowledge Bowl, Peer Court, and Visual Arts.

== Athletics ==
Los Amigos athletic teams are known as the Lobos, while the school itself is known as the Den of the Lobos. Los Amigos' athletic teams compete in the Garden Grove League.

=== State championships ===
- 2019 - Girls Soccer CIF Champions
- 2006 - Boys' Soccer CIF Champions
- 1992 - Water Polo CIF Champions
- 1981 - Football CIF Finalists

== Regional Occupation Program ==
Los Amigos offers Regional Occupation Program (ROP) courses in the following disciplines: Art of Animation, Automotive Careers, Business Applications, Computer Aided Drafting, Construction Technology, General Office Clerk, Restaurant Careers, and Software Specialist.

== Notable alumni ==
- Mike Pompeo - Former United States Secretary of State
