= Danny Lockin =

American actor and dancer (1943–1977)

- Born: Daniel Joseph Lockin; July 13, 1943; Lanai, Hawaii, U.S.
- Died: August 21, 1977 (aged 34); Anaheim, California, U.S.
- Cause of death: Homicide
- Resting place: Westminster Memorial Park, Westminster, California
- Other name: Danny Lochin
- Education: Rancho Alamitos High School
- Occupations: Actor, dancer
- Years active: 1962–1970
- Known for: Barnaby Tucker in Hello, Dolly! on stage and film
- Spouse: Kathy Haas (m. 1967; div. 1969)
- Children: 1

Daniel Joseph Lockin (July 13, 1943 – August 21, 1977) was an American actor and dancer who appeared on stage, television, and film. He was best known for his portrayal of the character Barnaby Tucker in the 1969 film Hello, Dolly!.

== Early life ==
Born in Hawaii, Lockin was raised in Omaha, Nebraska. He began dancing professionally at area fairs at the age of eight. His act co-starred Neal Reynolds, an African American boy with whom he would tap dance, tell jokes, pantomime, and do impressions of famous people.

During his junior year in high school, Lockin's family moved to Anaheim, California, where he graduated from Rancho Alamitos High School. He was cast in leading juvenile roles in regional productions of Gypsy: A Musical Fable, The Music Man, and Time for Everything. After graduation, he immediately began working as a professional actor and dancer.

== Career ==
Lockin had an early, and uncredited, role as one of Dainty June's farm boys in the 1962 film version of Gypsy. He appeared in the play Morning Sun in October 1963 with Patricia Neway and Bert Convy, but it closed after nine performances. The New York Times said he "dances with acrobatic suppleness and engaging freshness". He made his Broadway debut on April 8, 1964, in West Side Story in New York City in the role of Gee-Tar (a role he left on May 3), and appeared as an actor and dancer in a regional production of Take Me Along. Later that year, he was cast in a starring role in the musical Tom Sawyer, which played at the St. Louis Municipal Opera.

He replaced Jerry Dodge in the role of Barnaby Tucker in Hello, Dolly! in the winter of 1965, and went across the United States on six traveling productions with several actresses playing Dolly Levi, including Betty Grable, Ginger Rogers, Eve Arden, Dorothy Lamour and Anne Russell. He remained in the role for the movie version of Hello, Dolly!, and when filming for that ended, continued the role in the Broadway version of Hello, Dolly!, where he worked with both Ethel Merman and Phyllis Diller until it closed on December 27, 1970. He had mixed feelings about Carol Channing as Dolly, about whom he once said: "Carol Channing is rather disconcerting. You'll notice her looking at you with those big baby-stare eyes. Then eventually it dawns on you that the person behind those eyes is, in show business terms, about 200 years old." He also later expressed unhappiness with the way audiences reacted to Merman in the role of Dolly Levi, and how this changed the show. "She wasn't Dolly up there, she was Ethel Merman in Dolly clothes. ... The audiences came, of course; they came to see the Ethel Merman version. But it wasn't Hello, Dolly! any more, it was her show. ... Channing or Streisand, they were part of a cast, trying to act out a character. But with Ethel Merman—and not just her fault, with the audience, she was such an institution—the rest of us felt like just her chorus boys or her chorus line."

Lockin had a number of guest-star and incidental roles on television as well. He appeared on Father of the Bride, Dr. Kildare, Mr. Novak, My Three Sons, and the Sid Caesar Show. He did a screen test for the 1965 film version of The Sound of Music, but did not get the part. In 1967, he was cast in a minor role in the film The Graduate, but was contractually bound to continue in a regional production of Hello, Dolly! in Las Vegas, Nevada, and could not take the job.

Lockin was cast in the 1969 film version of Hello, Dolly! on the basis of his dancing. He underwent 13 screen tests before he got the part. He later said that doing the film was "the dream of my life". He felt a strong need to compete with the film's director, legendary dancer Gene Kelly. At one point during filming, he performed a series of four "butterflies" (a cartwheel in which a person does not put their hands on the ground) while Kelly looked on; Kelly suggested an improvement and, to demonstrate, leaped into six technically superior butterflies of his own. Lockin, chastened, reportedly sulked for three days. In April 1970, he guest-starred on The Dean Martin Show on television.

== Later life and death ==
In 1967, Lockin married dancer Kathy Haas, who was a bit-part dancer in a production of Hello, Dolly!, in San Francisco. Their son, Jeremy Daniel Lockin, was born in 1969. The couple divorced in late 1969.

After his divorce, Lockin went back on tour with Hello, Dolly!, continuing his role as Barnaby. He stayed with the tour until it ended; at which point, with his career in decline due to substance abuse issues, Lockin moved into his mother's apartment in Anaheim. Around 1974, Lockin began assisting his mother in running the Jean Lockin Dance Studio. The studio closed in early 1977, and Lockin began teaching at another dance studio.

On August 21, 1977, Lockin competed on the TV talent program The Gong Show, winning an award for the episode. Later that evening, he went to a gay bar in Garden Grove, California. He left the bar with a slight, 34-year-old unemployed medical clerk, Charles Leslie Hopkins. It was later revealed Hopkins had a police record, and was on probation at the time.

Several hours later, Hopkins called police to say that a man had entered his apartment and tried to rob him. Upon arrival, police found Lockin's body on the floor of Hopkins' apartment. He had been stabbed 100 times, and bled to death. His body had also been mutilated after death. Hopkins claimed he had no idea how the dead body got in his apartment, and was arrested immediately.

Lockin was interred at Westminster Memorial Park in Westminster, California.

=== Trial ===
Police found a book of pornographic pictures in Hopkins' apartment which showed men being tortured during sexual orgies. Prosecutors initially intended to seek a first degree murder conviction, and to use the book to prove that Hopkins had planned the murder. Hopkins' trial began in May 1978, but was delayed for two months after the prosecutor was injured in an unrelated accident. During the delay, the Supreme Court of the United States held in United States v. Chadwick, 433 U.S. 1 (1977), that police may not engage in warrantless searches in the absence of an exigency. On July 31, the trial court ruled the pornographic book inadmissible as evidence. On August 8, the trial court judge held that the death penalty could not be applied to Hopkins due to lack of evidence of premeditation.

On September 28, 1978, Hopkins was convicted of voluntary manslaughter and was sentenced to a three-year prison term. Since the court was permitted to consider suppressed evidence if the evidence was not seized merely to obtain a lengthier prison sentence and it did not "shock the conscience of the court," the trial judge increased Hopkins' sentence from the usual three years to four years. Prosecutors said that with good behavior, Hopkins would be released in two years (considering time served).

== Stage credits ==
Date	Production	Role
January 16, 1964 – December 31, 1970	Hello, Dolly!	Barnaby Tucker (Replacement)
April 8 – May 3, 1964	West Side Story	Gee-Tar

== Filmography ==
Year	Title	Role	Notes
1962	Gypsy	Yonkers Farm Boy	Uncredited
1963	The Stripper	Bit part	Uncredited
1964	My Three Sons	Jay Robinson	Episode: "The Substitute Teacher"
1969	Hello, Dolly!	Barnaby Tucker	
