= Bolsa Grande High School =

Public high school in Garden Grove, California, United States

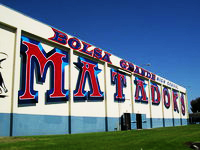
- Bolsa Grande High School

Location
- 9401 Westminster Blvd. Garden Grove, California 92844; United States; 33°45′43″N 117°57′52″W

Information
- School type: Public high school
- Founded: 1959
- Superintendent: Gabriella Mafi
- Principal: Linda Giuliani
- Staff: 78.44 (FTE)
- Grades: 9–12
- Enrollment: 1,726 (2023-2024)
- Student to teacher ratio: 22.00
- Language: English
- Area: Garden Grove, California
- Colors: Red, blue, and white
- Mascot: Matador
- Website: www.bolsagrande.org

Bolsa Grande High School is a public high school in the Garden Grove Unified School District in Garden Grove, in southern California, United States. The school opened on September 28, 1959. The school's nickname is the Matadors.

== Academics ==
Bolsa Grande (which translates from the Spanish as "big pocket" or "big bag") is geographically related to Bolsa Chica wetlands, and was named after the Bolsa Grande lowlands, which is the larger of the two topographical depressions and is set about five miles inland.

The high school was recognized as a California Distinguished School in 2007 and again in 2019. In 2008, the school's API was 770. The following year, 2009, the API increased to 789. In 2010, the API increased again to 797, with the average California High School API being 728. In 2011, Bolsa Grande's API score improved considerably from 797 to 822, the largest gain in the Garden Grove Unified School District for that year.

== Athletics ==
Bolsa Grande's sports teams are known as the Matadors and compete in the Garden Grove League of the California Interscholastic Federation's Southern Section. Their school mascot is "Matty the Matador".

The school is home to one of only two on-campus football stadiums in the GGUSD (the other is at Garden Grove High School). All seven high schools in the district share these two stadiums during football season.

== Notable alumni ==
- Darius Durham: former NFL player (San Francisco 49ers)
- Ray Krawczyk: former MLB player (Pittsburgh Pirates, California Angels, Milwaukee Brewers)
- Ron Meridith: former MLB player (Chicago Cubs, Texas Rangers)
- Glen Titensor (Class of 1976): NFL player for the Dallas Cowboys in 1981
