= Tommy Sandt =

American baseball player and coach (1950–2020)

- Shortstop
- Born: December 22, 1950; Brooklyn, New York, U.S.
- Died: December 1, 2020 (aged 69); Lake Oswego, Oregon, U.S.
- Batted: Right Threw: Right

MLB debut
- June 29, 1975, for the Oakland Athletics

Last MLB appearance
- October 3, 1976, for the Oakland Athletics

MLB statistics
- Batting average: .209
- Home runs: 0
- Runs batted in: 3
- Stats at Baseball Reference

Teams
- As player: Oakland Athletics (1975–1976); As coach: Pittsburgh Pirates (1987–1996, 2000–2002); Florida Marlins (1997–1998); Colorado Rockies (1999)

Career highlights and awards
- World Series champion (1997)

Thomas James Sandt (December 22, 1950 – December 1, 2020) was an American Major League Baseball player and coach, as well as a minor league manager. An infielder, Sandt played for the Oakland Athletics in 1975 and 1976. He threw and batted right-handed, stood 5 feet 11 inches (1.80 m) tall and weighed 175 pounds (79 kg). His professional playing career lasted all or parts of 15 seasons, and his MLB coaching tenure lasted for 16 years. He was the first-base coach of the 1997 world-champion Florida Marlins.

== Early life ==
Born in Brooklyn, Sandt graduated from Pacifica High School in West Garden Grove, California, in 1968.

== Career ==
He was selected by Oakland in the second round of the 1969 Major League Baseball draft, and made his pro debut that season. His MLB playing career consisted of 42 games: one appearance on June 29, 1975, as a defensive replacement at second base against the California Angels, and 41 games as a utility infielder in 1976, when he spent the entire season on the Oakland roster. In the majors, Sandt batted .209 in 67 at bats, with his 14 hits including one double. In the field, he got into 29 games as a shortstop, ten as a second baseman, and two as a third baseman.

Sandt joined the Pittsburgh Pirates' organization in 1979 while still an active player. He then managed Pirate farm teams in the Eastern League and Pacific Coast League from 1982 to 1986, and was voted 1984's PCL Manager of the Year while managing the Hawaii Islanders. In 1987, he joined the MLB coaching staff of Pittsburgh manager Jim Leyland, and worked under Leyland for the next 13 years with the Pirates (through 1996), Marlins (1997–1998) and Colorado Rockies (1999). He then returned to Pittsburgh for a 21/2-year stint under skippers Gene Lamont (2000) and Lloyd McClendon (2001–2002).

Tommy Sandt managed the Navegantes del Magallanes in the Venezuelan Professional Baseball League (LVBP) for three consecutive seasons in the mid-1980s: 1983-1984, 1984-1985, and 1985-1986. He was highly regarded for leading the team to the postseason in all three campaigns and is famously remembered for managing a young Barry Bonds during the 1985-1986 winter ball season.

== Death ==
Sandt died on December 1, 2020, in Lake Oswego, Oregon.
