= Alonzo Cook =

American physician, judge and real estate developer

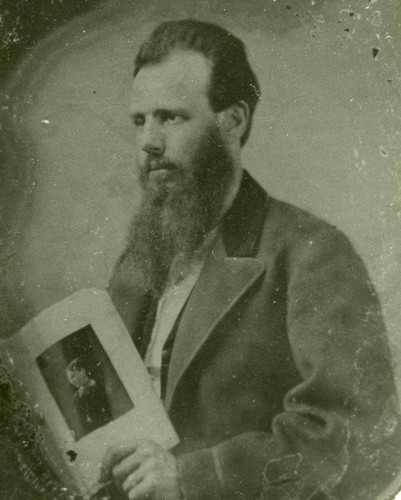
- Alonzo Gerry Cook, c. 1880
- Born: May 13, 1839; Casco, Maine, US
- Died: November 12, 1932 (aged 93); Olympia, Washington, US
- Education: Ohio State University
- Occupations: Physician, judge, farmer, real estate developer
- Known for: Founding of Garden Grove, California

Alonzo Gerry Cook (May 13, 1839 – November 12, 1932) was the founder of the city of Garden Grove, California, which is now a suburban community in Orange County.

== Early life ==
Cook was born 13 May 1839 in Casco, Maine. He met his future bride, Isabella W. Webster in 1860 while he was attending the Ohio State University, and she was teaching in Iowa. They married in 1861 when he was 22 years old and she was 18. The Cooks had one daughter Belle C. Cook (1863–1940), who was often known as Marabell. He had attended Ohio State University as well as Union Law School, which is now Northwestern University. Throughout their marriage, Cook and his wife relocated on several occasions, living in Iowa, Idaho, Oregon, California, and finally in Washington. He was an active freemason.

== Initial career ==
Alonso Cook's early jobs included serving as a probate judge in Ada County in the Idaho Territory, working as an attorney for the state of Washington, and also practicing as a physician. While in Vancouver, Washington, the Cook family resided briefly in the historic Charles Brown House, built in 1866, possibly by Alonzo himself. The unique Second Empire type architecture of the house suggests Alonzo may have built it since this type of construction typically hails from where Alonzo came from, the east coast. Second Empire architecture is rare on the west coast.

== Founding of Garden Grove ==
In 1874, the Cooks bought 160 acres (0.65 km^{2}) of land that was sold secondhand from the once-dominant Abel Stearns Ranch. The land covered what is now the area of Lampson Street to Garden Grove Boulevard and from Euclid/Main Street to Nutwood Street. There were only a few hundred people living on farms around the area at the time.

After their house was completed in 1874, Cook commenced the establishment of a civic center, the start of commerce, and a school district for the area. Cook donated all the land needed for these facilities, which were the first semblances of a village he named "Garden Grove". The local citizens did not like this name because it consisted of open fields. In 1877, the village of Garden Grove had a church, a blacksmith, a post office and a general store. By 1881, the Cook family moved on to pursue interests in other states and other enterprises.

A bronze statue of Alonzo G. Cook was erected in Community Center Park by the City of Garden Grove on the 50th anniversary of its incorporation on June 18, 1956.

== Later life ==
Cook spent the rest of his life in Washington state, dying in Olympia, Washington on 12 Nov 1932. He was buried in Tumwater, Washington at the Masonic Memorial Park.

== Film Reference ==
In Thunderbolt and Lightfoot (1974), the "A.G. Cook" on the mailbox in the Idaho Dream scene, by the Snake River in Idaho (actually the Missouri in Montana), is very likely an "Easter egg" nod to Cook by the film's property master Edward Aiona.

== Sources ==
- Doig, Leroy L., The Village of Garden Grove – 1870-1905. Orange, CA: The Paragon Agency, 2000.
- Head, H. C., The History of Garden Grove. Garden Grove, CA: The Garden Grove News, 1939.
