= Rancho Alamitos High School =

Location
- 11351 Dale Street; Garden Grove, California; United States; 33.7981°N 117.98512°W

Information
- Type: Public
- Established: 1957; 69 years ago
- School district: Garden Grove Unified School District
- Principal: Curtis Bruno
- Teaching staff: 75.89 (FTE)
- Grades: 9-12
- Enrollment: 1,557 (2023-2024)
- Student to teacher ratio: 20.03
- Language: English
- Colors: Green and Gold
- Team name: Vaqueros
- Website: www.ranchoalamitoshs.us

Rancho Alamitos High School is in Garden Grove, California, United States. It is a member of the Garden Grove Unified School District and serves north-central Garden Grove and a section of Stanton. The high school first opened in the spring of 1957 with no senior class. The first graduating class was in 1958.

== History ==
The school was named "Rancho Alamitos" (little cottonwoods ranch) in homage to the Rancho Los Alamitos landgrant and the Hispanic history in Orange County. The area of the Rancho Alamitos High School campus was originally part of the Rancho Los Alamitos landgrant, itself part of Rancho Los Nietos, a Spanish landgrant made in 1784. After John Bixby died in 1888, numerous sections of Rancho Los Alamitos were sold, and Lumis A. Evans, a real estate dealer, acquired the area. In the mid-1950s the Garden Grove Union High School District purchased forty acres of this land from the family of Mr. Evans. Construction of Rancho Alamitos High School began in 1956.

Rancho Alamitos High School was formulated for classes to start in the Fall of 1957; however, since the campus was not ready, their classes were taught for that first semester on the older Garden Grove High School campus. Although construction of the new campus was incomplete, in the Spring of 1957 the first classes at the Rancho Alamitos High School campus were held in two pre-existing homes on the property, ones that faced Dale Street. They continued to be used as classrooms until construction was completed in 1959. In the Spring of 1957, the Rancho Alamitos campus officially opened and the next Spring the first senior class graduated.

List of principals

- 1956–1957 — Don Kennedy
- 1957–1960 — Richard Bivin
- 1960–1961 — Sam Chicas
- 1961–1964 — Vic McClain
- 1964–1966 — William Zogg
- 1966–1976 — Tracy Strong
- 1976–1982 — Ron Forsyth
- 1982–1985 — Jim DeLong
- 1985–1991 — Bob Mesa
- 1991–2000 — Tom Robins
- 2000–2006 — Gene Campbell
- 2006–2009 — Frank Mackay
- 2009–2023 — Mary Jane Hibbard
- 2023–2025 — Linda Giuliani
- 2025–present — Curtis Bruno

=== Logo ===
The school colors are green and gold. Until the mid-1970s the school mascot had been "Poco", a cartoon character of a short male dressed in a large poncho with a serape, a Mexican–Indian throw blanket or rug over one shoulder and a large sombrero on his head, covering the eyes.

one of several renditions of the historical Poco image

The school logo was changed to a cowboy boot spur because of racial controversy regarding the character of Poco. More recently, the school's crest or a big letter V with the word "Rancho" across it would be seen on most planners and/or merchandise.

one of many renditions of the Rancho Alamitos shield

one of the most common Rancho logos

== Academics ==
Based on the 2013 academic year, U.S. News & World Report in its "The Best Schools in United States" ranked Rancho Alamitos High School as #367 (out of 2,199) among California schools, and #1718 (out of more than 21,000) in the nation. With that rank, it awarded RAHS the Silver Medal.

== Sports ==
The school's athletic teams are known as the Vaqueros (a Spanish type of cowboy figure), though Rancho students tend to shorten its name to "Vaqs".

The athletic teams are part of California Interscholastic Federation's Southern Section, participating in the six-team Garden Grove League, mostly against other schools in the Garden Grove Unified School District.

Sports at Rancho Alamitos High School have included:

- Baseball
- Basketball
- Cheerleading
- Color Guard
- Cross Country
- Football
- Soccer
- Softball
- Swim
- Tennis
- Track and Field
- Volleyball
- Water Polo
- Marching Band

=== Football ===
1990s

The Vaquero football team had moderate success in the early to mid 1990s, led by a slew of talented running. The team made two straight Division VII Finals appearance. Falling just short in 1992 by a score of 14-13, to Sunny Hills High School. Running Back Leon Vickers was the Division VII player of the year for his performance. The following year they fell to Mira Costa 29 to 17. In 1996 and 1997 the Vaqs posted back to back undefeated regular seasons, only to lose to rival Pacifica in the Semi-finals ('96) and Northview in the Quarter Finals ('97). In 1996 Leo Kosi was the Division VIII MVP, while in 1997 David Vickers held the same honor.

Since 2000

The Vaqueros made a Finals appearance in 2014, only to lose to rival Garden Grove 35 to 0. On 16 October 2015, Garden Grove defeated Rancho Alamitos 34 to 3, with no points scored in the second half.

== Notable alumni ==
- Richard Andrew Anderson (class of 1978) – NBA Basketball player.
- Patrick Burris (class of 1968) – Olympian judoka in 1972 and 1976, and Pan American Games bronze medalist in 1975.
- Gary Hall, Sr. (class of 1969) – Olympian swimmer in 1968, 1972 and 1976.
- Gary Hill (class of 1961) – played for the Minnesota Vikings in 1965.
- Gerald Laird (attended his freshman year, graduated from La Quinta High School ) – catcher for the St. Louis Cardinals.
- Danny Lockin – stage and film actor.
- Steve Martin (attended his freshman and sophomore years, graduated from Garden Grove High School in 1963) – comedian, writer, actor, musician and composer.
- Matt Nguyen "Dumbo" (class of 2008) – Member of Poreotics, Winner of America's Best Dance Crew.
- Dennis Paepke (class of 1963) - MLB player for Kansas City Royals from 1969-1974
- Craig Paquette (class of 1987) – MLB third baseman from 1993–2003.
- Nam Phan (class of 2002) – MMA fighter.
- Curt Pringle (class of 1977) – former state assemblyman, Speaker of the California State Assembly in 1996 and former mayor of Anaheim, California 2002-2010.
- Christi Robell – 1980 and 1984 Olympic gymnast and 1979 Junior National Gymnastics Champion.
- Jim Silva (class of 1962) – former state assemblyman, former Member of the Orange County Board of Supervisors, former mayor of Huntington Beach
- Nicole Brown Simpson (graduated from Dana Hills High School in 1977) – ex-wife of football star O. J. Simpson.
- Paul Soliai (attended his freshman, sophomore and junior years before moving to American Samoa) – defensive tackle For the Miami Dolphins and pro bowler.
- Shawn Stussy – founder of Stüssy
- Randy Vataha (class of 1967) – NFL wide receiver.
