= List of mayors of Garden Grove, California =

Mayor of Garden Grove
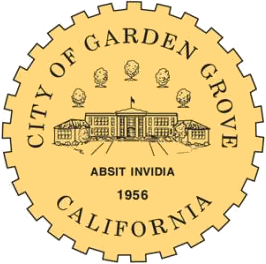
- Seal of Garden Grove

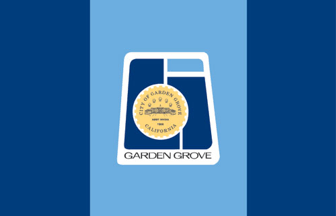
- Flag of Garden Grove

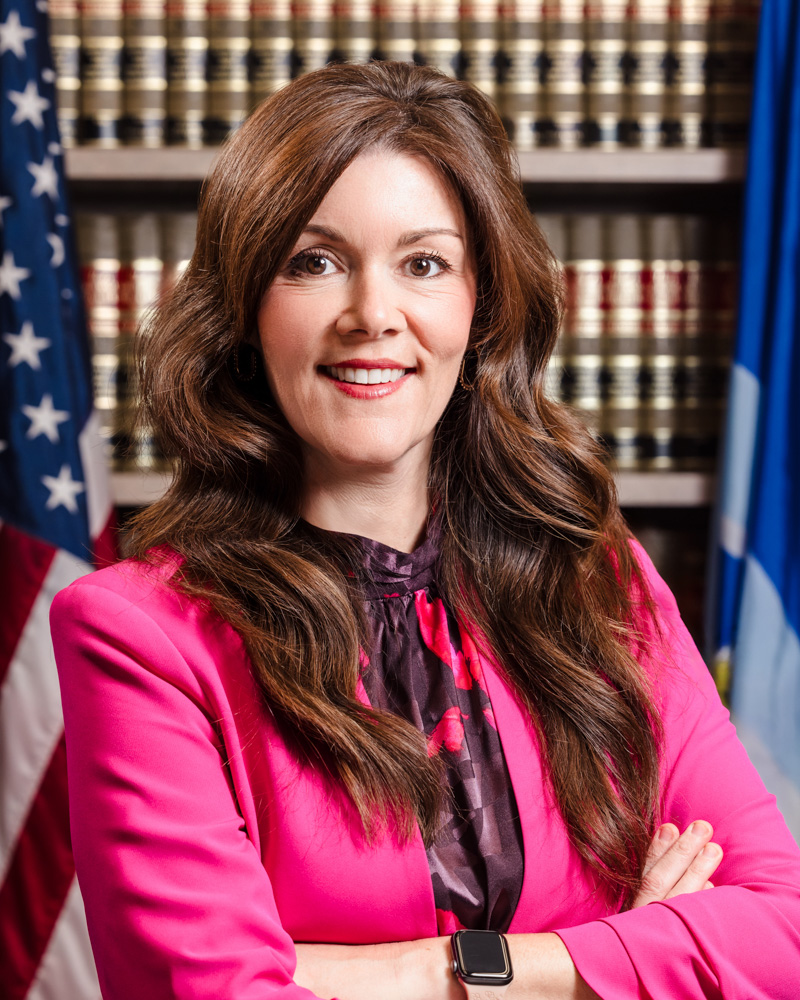
- Incumbent; Stephanie Klopfenstein since December 10, 2024
- Term length: 4 years
- Formation: 1956
- First holder: Louis H. Lake

This is a list of mayors of Garden Grove, California since its incorporation in 1956.

== List of mayors of Garden Grove ==
#	Image	Name	Took office	Left office
1		Louis H. Lake	1956	1960
2		George B. Honold	1960	1968
3		H. Reece Ballard	1968	1969^{1}
4		Kathryn Barr	1969^{2}	1970
5		Laurence J. Schmit	1970	1970^{3}
6		H. Reece Ballard (2nd term)	1970	1972
7		Bernard C. Adams	1972	1976
8		J. Tilman Williams	1976	1978
9		Elerth (Rick) Erickson	1978	1980
10		Jonathan Cannon	1980	1987^{4}
11		J. Tilman Williams (2nd term)	1987	1988
12		Walter E. (Walt) Donovan	1988	1992
13		Francis (Frank) Kessler	1992	1994
14		Bruce Broadwater	1994	2004
15		William (Bill) Dalton	2004	2012
16		Bruce Broadwater (2nd term)	2012	2014
17		Bao Nguyen	2014	2016
18		Steven R. Jones	2016	2024
19		Stephanie Klopfenstein	2024	Incumbent

== Elections ==
=== 2016 ===
2016 Garden Grove, California mayoral election
Candidate	Votes	%
Steve Jones	42,514	98.8%
Tony Flores (write-in)	521	1.2%
Total votes	43,055	100%

=== 2018 ===
2018 Garden Grove, California mayoral election
Candidate	Votes	%
Steve Jones (incumbent)	33,788	84.4%
Donald Taylor	6,227	15.6%
Total votes	40,015	100%

== Notes ==
- ^{1. Ballard resigned as mayor on April 22, 1969, but remained as a city council member.}
- ^{2. Barr was appointed mayor upon Ballard's resignation.}
- ^{3. Schmit served less than seven months as mayor until a motion was voted on by the city council to reorganize, which took place November 3, 1970. Ballard was then re-elected.}
- ^{4. Cannon resigned on July 17, 1987 due to being appointed a judge for the West Orange County Judicial District by Governor George Deukmejian. Williams was re-elected mayor in a special election in 1987.}
