= Michael Peri =

Michael A. Peri
- Born: March 21, 1967 (age 59)
- Known for: Espionage conviction during the Cold War

Michael A. Peri (born March 21, 1967) was a Military Intelligence Electronic Warfare Signals Analyst for the United States Army during the Cold War, who was convicted of espionage in 1989 and sentenced to 30 years in prison.

== Biography ==
Peri was born in California, the son of Fred R. Peri (1937–2015) and Winnie Lee Peri (1938–2020). He grew up in La Habra, California. He lived in an expatriate colony in South Africa for three years as a teenager, and he also attended a year of school in Salzburg, Austria. He graduated from La Quinta High School in Westminster, California, in 1983 and then joined the Army Reserves.

On February 20, 1989, Peri vanished from the 11th Armored Cavalry Regiment (ACR) in Fulda, West Germany. An exhaustive search was conducted to locate him when it was discovered that he had stolen a portable computer that was used to store classified military defense plans. Peri was not found, although it was suspected that he had defected to East Germany when a Humvee that he had stolen was located near the East German border.

Eleven days later, for reasons that have never been fully explained, Peri turned himself in at the front gate of the 11th ACR. He was greeted at HQ by Col Abrams and arrested by Military Police SPC Shull. He was court-martialed for espionage, where he was convicted on June 25, 1989, and sentenced to 30 years. Even after the conclusion of the court-martial, investigators were perplexed at what had caused this strange turn of events. Peri had twice been nominated for a "Soldier of the Month" award in his unit. During interrogation, Peri admitted he felt overworked and taken for granted by his superior officers. Other soldiers who were interrogated said Peri was often seen with an attractive woman whom they believed to be an East German agent. The woman whom he had been fraternizing with likely exploited his dissatisfaction with the Army to entice him to defecting to East Germany. Peri's voluntary return to West Germany and his surrender to the U.S. Military Police was most likely due to him being overcome by a guilty conscience for a rash decision.

== See also ==
- James Hall III – an Army warrant officer and intelligence analyst in Germany who sold eavesdropping and code secrets to East Germany and the Soviet Union from 1983 to 1988.
- George Trofimoff – a then retired Army Reserve colonel, who was charged in June 2000 with spying for the KGB and the Russian Foreign Intelligence Service (or SVR) for over 25 years.
- John Anthony Walker – an American communications specialist who was convicted of spying
- Aldrich Ames – an ex-CIA agent convicted of spying for Russia
- Noshir Gowadia – an ex-employee of Northrop who sold classified B2 stealth technology to China
- William Kampiles – a CIA employee who was convicted of selling a classified KH-11 spy satellite manual to the Soviet Union
