= Matt Nguyen =

Matt Nguyen (Dumbo)
- Born: Nguyễn Hữu Quốc Vinh; March 25, 1989 (age 37); Ho Chi Minh City, Vietnam
- Occupations: Dancer, choreographer, DJ
- Years active: 2007-present
- Spouse: Tessa Elizabeth (m. 2014)
- Musical career
- Genres: EDM, electronic house, dance, dubstep
- Instruments: Drum machine, guitar

Matthew Vinh Nguyen (born March 23, 1989), better known as Dumbo, is a Vietnamese-American dancer, choreographer and DJ. He is a member of the Asian-American dance crew Poreotics, as well as the DJ duo ARIUS.

== Biography ==
Matt Nguyen was born Nguyễn Hữu Quốc Vinh on March 25 1989 in Ho Chi Minh City, Vietnam. At the age of 10, Nguyen and his family moved to the United States. Nguyen attended Rancho Alamitos High School, and later the Paul Mitchell school.

== Career ==
=== 2007-2014: Poreotics ===
Dumbo performed at dance exhibitions and competitions. In December 2007, along with two friends formed a popping and robotics dance group called Poreotics.

However, Poreotics was not the only dance crew Dumbo was a part of around this time. He was also a member of Sick Step Crew and PAC Modern Dance Troupe. On the team, Dumbo found and recruited a new member to be a part of Poreotics – Lawrence “Law” Devera. Another person they recruited around the same time was Justin “Jet-Li” Valles, who was a well-known popping dancer. In 2009, Valles was in Asia at the time and could not perform with the team. In order to find a quick replacement, Dumbo recruited Andrew “Chad” Fausto-Mayate, who was member of PAC Modern, into Poreotics. Poreotics, minus Valles, performed at Hip Hop Internationals. The team won 1st in the USA division and 7th in the world. After Valles returned, the team auditioned for the third season and fourth season of America’s Best Dance Crew. Consequently, the team did not make the cut. Despite this, the team stood strong and continued to perform at competitions and exhibitions. The team auditioned again for the fifth season of America’s Best Dance Crew in 2010 and was accepted onto the dance program.

Dumbo led and choreographed Poreotics’ performances while on America’s Best Dance Crew. The team’s choreography focused on popping and robotics elements, along with theatrical comedic skits dashed into their pieces. They would also include other elements such as tutting and breakdancing; Dumbo and his team made sure to showcase every member and their skills for each dance. Their pieces are performed to heavy EDM and dubstep music, which were mixed by Dumbo and Can. Ultimately, Poreotics won season five of America’s Best Dance Crew.

They held their own dance tour called the “Tic Tic Tour” in Australia, and eventually New York.

In 2011, Dumbo and his team would continue to feature in music videos, hold another dance tour in Australia, and perform at dance showcases and the 2011 Teen Choice Awards. They featured in Bruno Mars’ “The Lazy Song” music video as chimpanzees and were nominated for Best Choreography at the 2011 MTV Video Music Awards. Apart from Poreotics, Dumbo would have his own solo successes as well. Dumbo created and mentored “Miniotics”, a popping and robotics team composed of pre-teens that would carry on the legacy of Poreotics. He also featured in Indian-singer Ganesh Hegde’s “Let’s Party” music video and Chelo A., Jay R and Q-York’s “Connection” music video as a background dancer.

== Discography ==
=== Extended plays ===
- Motha Fatha Bass (2019)

== Filmography ==
Music videos
Year	Song	Artist	Notes
2011	"The Lazy Song"	Bruno Mars	
2011	"Let's Party"	Ganesh Hegde	
2011	"Connection"	Chelo A., Jay R, Q-York	
