= Garden Grove, California =

City in California, U.S.

- City
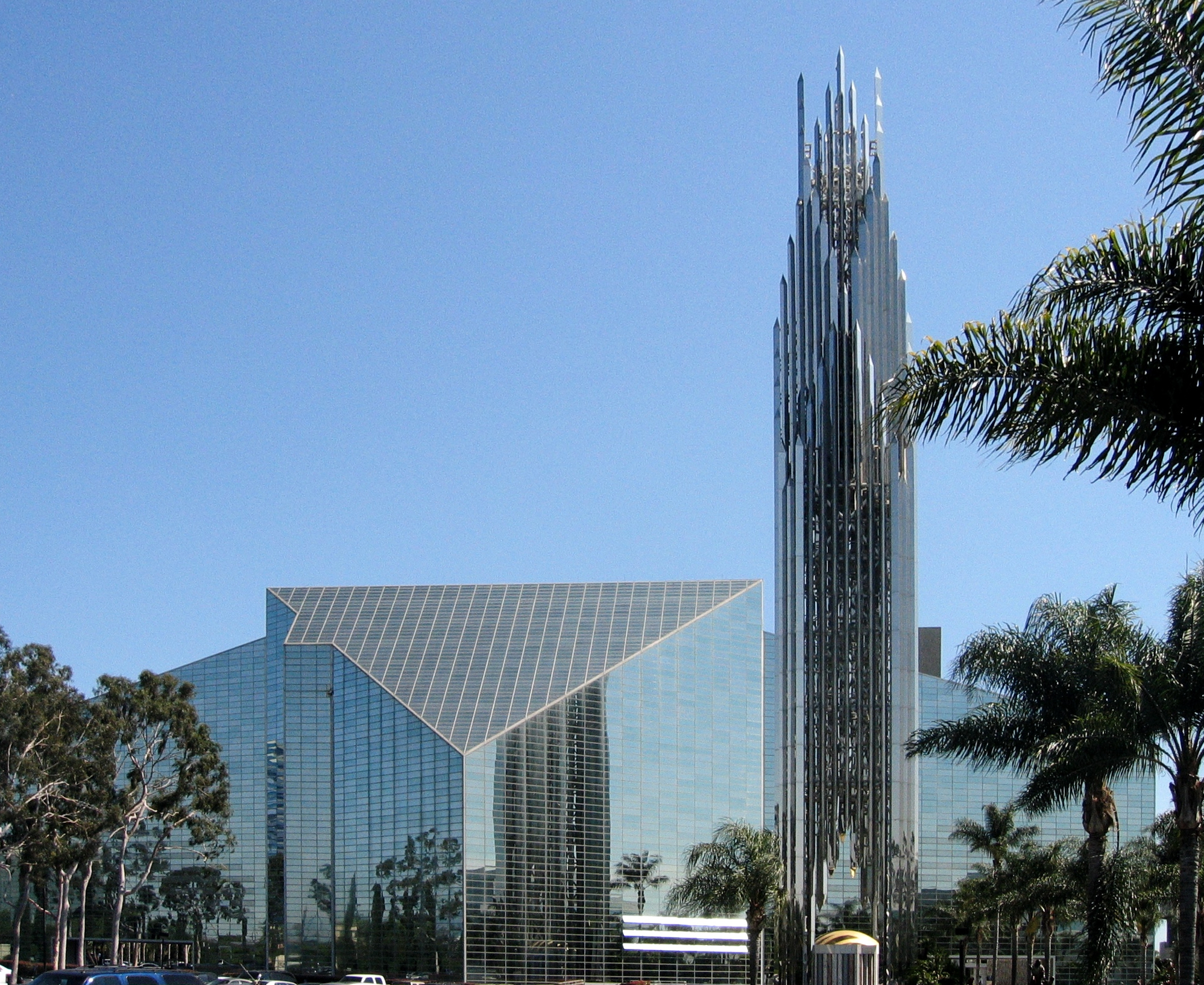
- Christ Cathedral

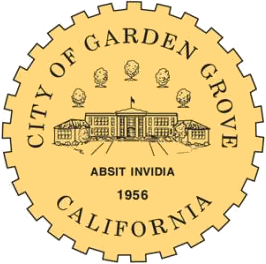
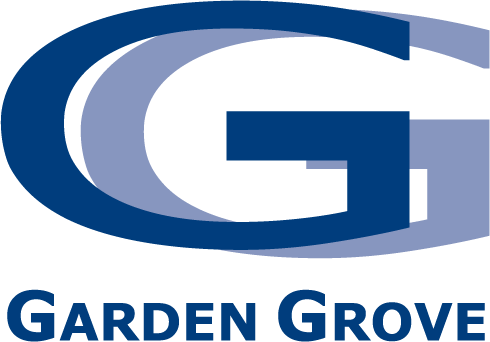
- Flag Seal
- Motto(s): Absit Invidia (Latin), 'Let there be no ill will' and ‘City of Youth and Ambition’ (1988-)
- Interactive map of Garden Grove, California
- Location in the United States
- Coordinates: 33°46′44″N 117°57′37″W
- Country: United States
- State: California
- County: Orange
- Founded: 1874
- Incorporated: June 18, 1956

Government
  - Type: Council–manager
  - Mayor: Stephanie Klopfenstein (R)
  - Mayor Pro Tem: George S. Brietigam III (District 1)
  - City council: George S. Brietigam III (District 1); Phillip Nguyen (District 2); Cindy Ngoc Tran (District 3); Joe DoVinh (District 4); Yesenia Muñeton (District 5); Ariana Arestegui (District 6)
  - City Manager: Lisa L. Kim
  - Deputy City Manager: Maria Stipe

Area
  - Total: 17.98 sq mi (46.56 km^{2})
  - Land: 17.96 sq mi (46.51 km^{2})
  - Water: 0.019 sq mi (0.05 km^{2}) 0.10%
- Elevation: 89 ft (27 m)

Population (2020)
  - Total: 171,949
  - Rank: 5th in Orange County; 30th in California
  - Density: 9,558.08/sq mi (3,690.40/km^{2})
- Time zone: UTC−8 (Pacific)
  - Summer (DST): UTC−7 (PDT)
- ZIP Codes: 92840–92846
- Area codes: 657/714
- FIPS code: 06-29000
- GNIS feature IDs: 1660662, 2410568
- Website: ggcity.org

Garden Grove is a city in northern Orange County, California, United States. The population was 171,949 at the 2020 census. State Route 22, also known as the Garden Grove Freeway, passes through the city in an east–west direction. The western portion of the city is known as West Garden Grove.

== History ==
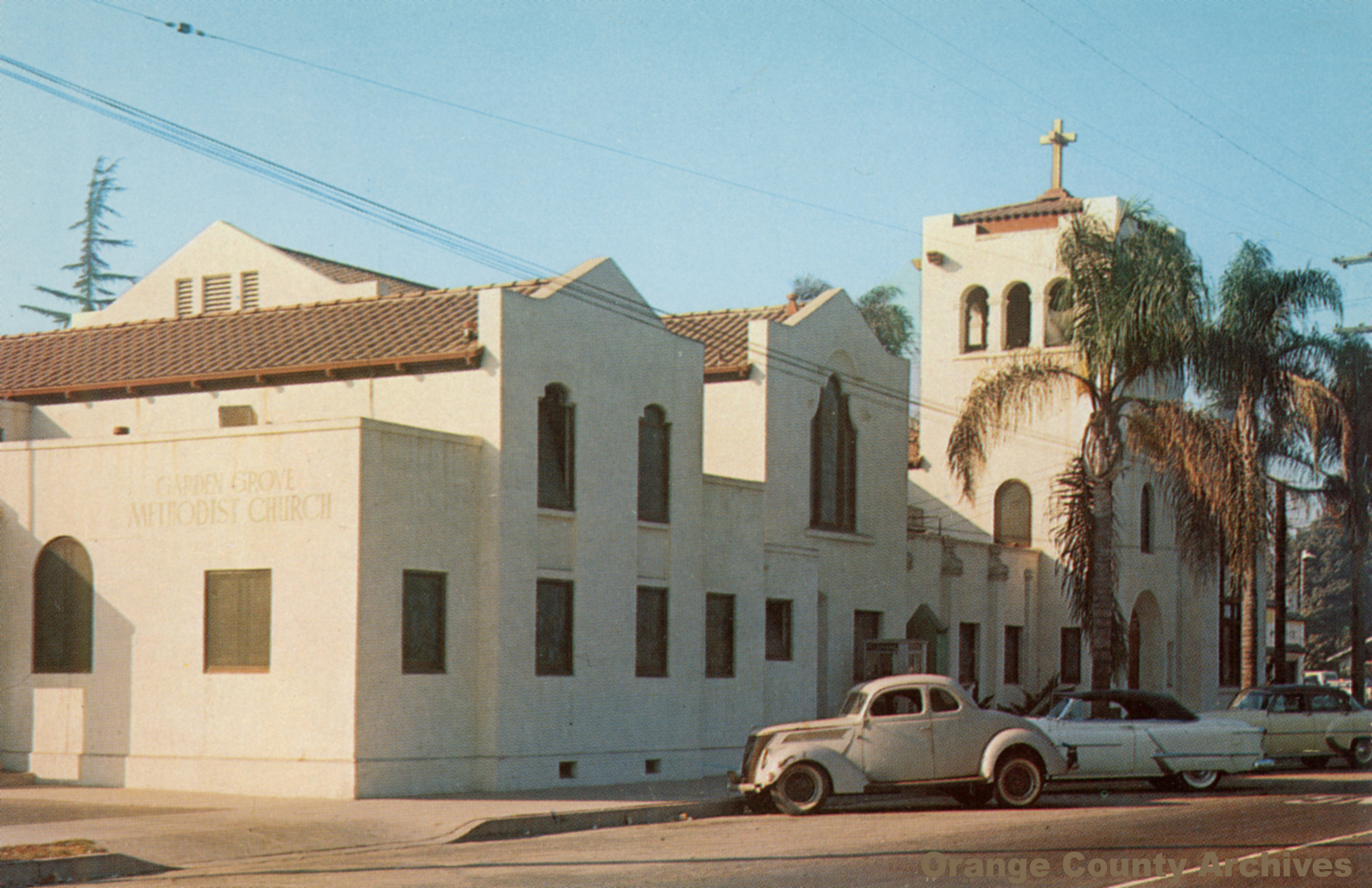
Garden Grove, c. 1950s

=== Nineteenth century ===
Rancho Las Bolsas was a land grant under Mexican governance that primarily dealt in cattle ranching in the central Orange County floodplains. Native inhabitants were displaced under the Spanish colonization and Mexican land grants.

Garden Grove was founded by Alonzo Cook in 1874. A school district and Methodist church were organized that year. It remained a small rural crossroads and farming community until the arrival of the Pacific Electric Railroad in 1905. The rail connection helped the town prosper with the influx of tourists, visitors and eventually settlers, and it was noted for its crops of oranges, walnuts, chili peppers and later strawberries.

=== Twentieth century ===
In 1933, much of the town's central business district was destroyed by the Long Beach earthquake, and one person was killed at the high school. The post-World War II boom led to rapid development, and Garden Grove was incorporated as a city in 1956 with about 44,000 residents.

In 1956, Orange County Plaza (now The Promenade) was opened at Chapman and Brookhurst, and upon its expansion in 1959, it had 60 stores, including a J. C. Penney, two variety stores and two supermarkets, and billed itself as both the largest and the first regional shopping center in Orange County.

=== Twenty-first century ===
During the 1970s, Korean Americans began to move into Garden Grove, in several waves of migration. It eventually turned the area into "Little Seoul" (also referred to as Korea Town), and grew to be the second largest Korean business district on the west coast. Since its initial establishment, the Korean American population has expanded to other nearby cities like Fullerton and Irvine, but it claims to have the oldest "Little Seoul" in Orange County.

In May 2026, a leak of methyl methacrylate at the GKN Aerospace plant forced the evacuation of 40,000 residents in the immediate area due to the risk of the 34,000 gallon tank either spilling over or exploding.

== Geography ==
Garden Grove has a rugged set of boundaries with many panhandles. The West Garden Grove neighborhood is west of Beach Boulevard and is largely separated from the rest of Garden Grove by the city of Stanton, with a small bridge of jurisdiction linking the two along Garden Grove Boulevard. A panhandle in the southern part of the town's borders situated between Westminster's Ward Street to the west and Santa Ana's Euclid Street to the east creates a small border with the city of Fountain Valley. Other neighboring cities include Cypress and Anaheim to the north, Orange to the east, and the cities of Seal Beach and Los Alamitos to the west.

According to the United States Census Bureau, the city has a total area of 46.5 km^{2} (18.0 mi^{2}), 0.10% of which is water.

== Demographics ==
Historical population
Census	Pop.	Note	%±
1950	5,762		—
1960	84,238		1,362.0%
1970	121,155		43.8%
1980	123,307		1.8%
1990	143,050		16.0%
2000	165,196		15.5%
2010	170,883		3.4%
2020	171,949		0.6%
U.S. Decennial Census; 1860–1870 1880–1890; 1900 1910 1920; 1930 1940 1950; 1960 1970 1980; 1990 2000 2010; 2020

Garden Grove first appeared as an unincorporated place in the 1950 U.S. census; and after incorporation, as a city in the 1960 U.S. census. Prior to 1950, it was part of unincorporated Anaheim Township (pop 26,097 in 1940).

=== Racial and ethnic composition ===
Garden Grove, California – Racial and ethnic composition Note: the US Census treats Hispanic/Latino as an ethnic category. This table excludes Latinos from the racial categories and assigns them to a separate category. Hispanics/Latinos may be of any race.
Race / Ethnicity (NH = Non-Hispanic)	Pop 1980	Pop 1990	Pop 2000	Pop 2010	Pop 2020	% 1980	% 1990	% 2000	% 2010	% 2020
White alone (NH)	97,442	78,182	53,735	38,558	28,172	79.02%	54.65%	32.53%	22.56%	16.38%
Black or African American alone (NH)	726	1,938	1,873	1,752	1,595	0.59%	1.35%	1.13%	1.03%	0.93%
Native American or Alaska Native alone (NH)	1,313	610	523	286	220	1.06%	0.43%	0.32%	0.17%	0.13%
Asian alone (NH)	7,162	28,538	50,803	63,118	72,524	5.81%	19.95%	30.75%	36.94%	42.18%
Native Hawaiian or Pacific Islander alone (NH)	7,162	28,538	995	1,030	759	5.81%	19.95%	0.60%	0.60%	0.44%
Other race alone (NH)	125	203	210	219	688	0.10%	0.14	0.13%	0.13%	0.40%
Mixed race or Multiracial (NH)	x	x	3,449	2,841	3,889	x	x	2.09%	1.66%	2.26%
Hispanic or Latino (any race)	16,539	33,579	53,608	63,079	64,102	13,41%	23.47%	32.45%	36.91%	37.28%
Total	123,307	143,050	165,196	170,883	171,949	100.00%	100.00%	100.00%	100.00%	100.00%

=== 2020 census ===
The 2020 United States census reported that Garden Grove had a population of 171,949. The population density was 9,576.1 inhabitants per square mile (3,697.4/km^{2}). The racial makeup of Garden Grove was 21.9% White, 1.0% African American, 1.2% Native American, 42.4% Asian, 0.5% Pacific Islander, 20.9% from other races, and 12.1% from two or more races. Hispanic or Latino of any race were 37.3% of the population.

The census reported that 98.8% of the population lived in households, 0.8% lived in non-institutionalized group quarters, and 0.3% were institutionalized.

There were 47,362 households, out of which 39.3% included children under the age of 18, 53.3% were married-couple households, 5.7% were cohabiting couple households, 24.8% had a female householder with no partner present, and 16.2% had a male householder with no partner present. 14.2% of households were one person, and 7.3% were one person aged 65 or older. The average household size was 3.59. There were 38,030 families (80.3% of all households).

The age distribution was 20.9% under the age of 18, 10.0% aged 18 to 24, 26.2% aged 25 to 44, 28.2% aged 45 to 64, and 14.7% who were 65 years of age or older. The median age was 39.1 years. For every 100 females, there were 97.4 males.

There were 48,562 housing units at an average density of 2,704.5 units per square mile (1,044.2 units/km^{2}), of which 47,362 (97.5%) were occupied. Of these, 54.0% were owner-occupied, and 46.0% were occupied by renters.

In 2023, the US Census Bureau estimated that 45.3% of the population were foreign-born. Of all people aged 5 or older, 32.1% spoke only English at home, 29.0% spoke Spanish, 1.1% spoke other Indo-European languages, 36.8% spoke Asian or Pacific Islander languages, and 0.9% spoke other languages. Of those aged 25 or older, 75.4% were high school graduates and 24.9% had a bachelor's degree.

The median household income was $90,166, and the per capita income was $32,387. About 9.4% of families and 12.2% of the population were below the poverty line.

=== 2010 ===
The 2010 United States census reported that Garden Grove had a population of 170,883. The population density was 9,515.3 inhabitants per square mile (3,673.9/km^{2}). The racial makeup of Garden Grove was 68,149 (39.9%) White, 2,155 (1.3%) Black, 983 (0.6%) Native American, 63,451 (37.1%) Asian, 1,110 (0.6%) Pacific Islander, 28,916 (16.9%) from other races, and 6,119 (3.6%) from two or more races. Hispanic or Latino of any race were 63,079 persons (36.9%). Non-Hispanic whites were 22.6% of the population, down from 90.6% in 1970. Vietnamese Americans numbered 47,331 of the population. At 27.7% this was the highest concentration of any city in the United States except for adjacent Westminster.

The census reported that 168,942 people (98.9% of the population) lived in households, 1,234 (0.7%) lived in non-institutionalized group quarters, and 707 (0.4%) were institutionalized.

There were 46,037 households, out of which 21,361 (46.4%) had children under the age of 18 living in them, 26,659 (57.9%) were opposite-sex married couples living together, 6,866 (14.9%) had a female householder with no husband present, 3,588 (7.8%) had a male householder with no wife present. There were 2,025 (4.4%) unmarried opposite-sex partnerships, and 269 (0.6%) same-sex married couples or partnerships. 6,491 households (14.1%) were made up of individuals, and 2,842 (6.2%) had someone living alone who was 65 years of age or older. The average household size was 3.67. There were 37,113 families (80.6% of all households); the average family size was 3.94.

The population was spread out, with 43,763 people (25.6%) under the age of 18, 17,383 people (10.2%) aged 18 to 24, 49,105 people (28.7%) aged 25 to 44, 42,106 people (24.6%) aged 45 to 64, and 18,526 people (10.8%) who were 65 years of age or older. The median age was 35.6 years. For every 100 females, there were 99.6 males. For every 100 females age 18 and over, there were 7.7 males.

There were 47,755 housing units at an average density of 2,659.1 per square mile (1,026.7/km^{2}), of which 26,240 (57.0%) were owner-occupied, and 19,797 (43.0%) were occupied by renters. The homeowner vacancy rate was 1.2%; the rental vacancy rate was 4.6%. 96,308 people (56.4% of the population) lived in owner-occupied housing units and 72,634 people (42.5%) lived in rental housing units.

According to the 2010 United States census, Garden Grove had a median household income of $59,988, with 15.5% of the population living below the federal poverty line.

== Economy ==
According to the city's 2023 Annual Comprehensive Financial Report, the top employers in the city are:

Rank	Employer	Number of employees
1	Great Wolf Lodge Southern California	700
2	Air Industries Corp.	625
3	Garden Grove Hospital Medical Center	516
4	Hyatt Regency Orange County	424
5	GKN Aerospace Transparency Systems, Inc.	409
6	Safran Cabin	350
7	Costco	323
8	Full Clip	310
9	Walmart	272
10	Saint Gobain Performance Plastics Corp.	226

== Arts and culture ==
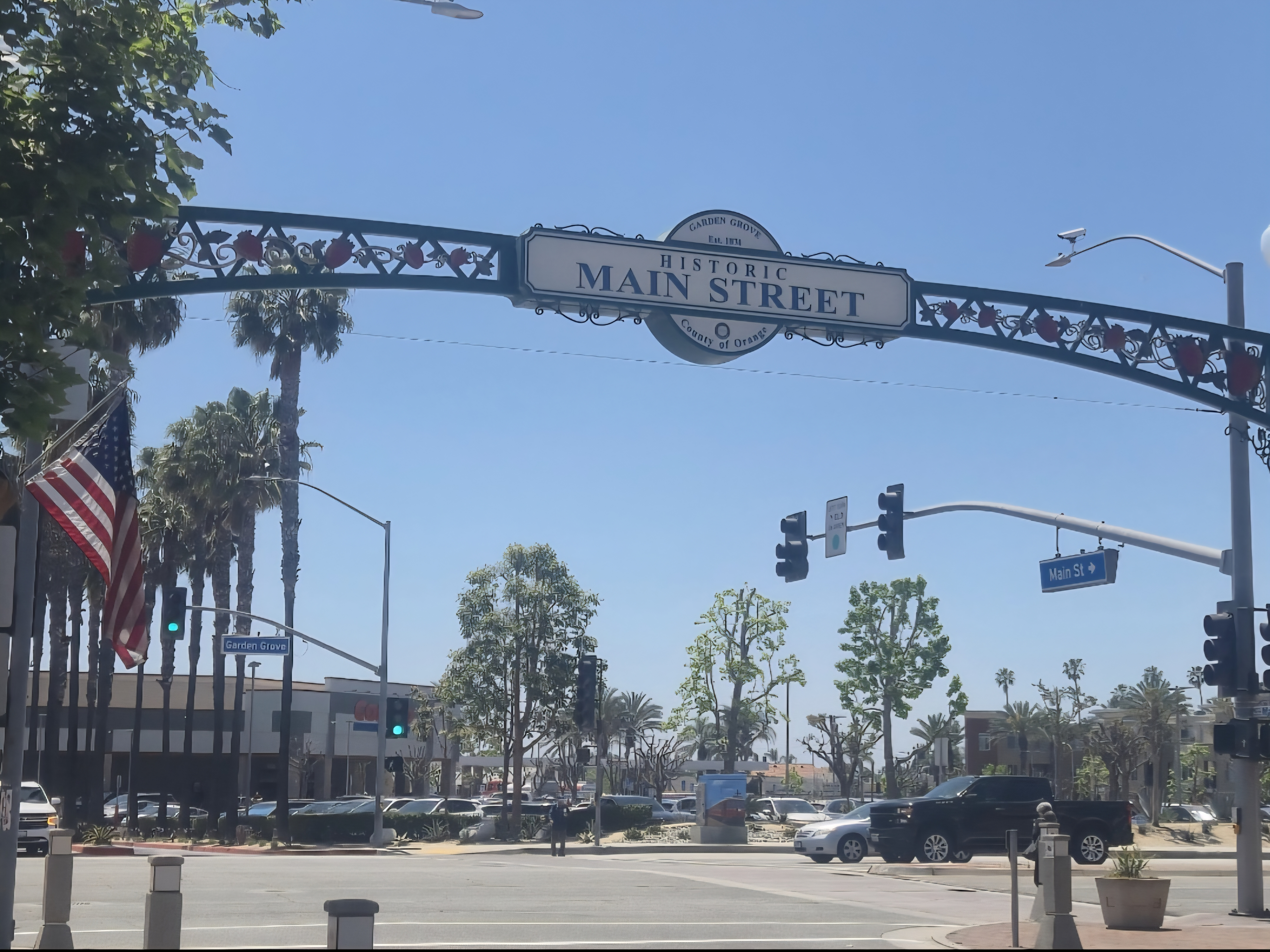
Main Street Archway

Garden Grove is home to two stage theaters, the Gem Theater and the Garden Amphitheater (stylized as Garden AMP). The Garden AMP was known formerly as The Festival Amphitheater, and hosted Shakespeare Orange County. Both venues are owned by the City of Garden Grove, but operated by outside entities. In addition to theater, the Garden AMP hosts frequent musical performances.

The Garden Grove Playhouse used to be an active theater, now closed down. It was operated by a non-profit group of the same name.

=== Memorial Day ===
An annual event held over Memorial Day weekend, the Garden Grove Strawberry Festival is one of the largest community festivals in the western United States, attracting an estimated 250,000 visitors. It began in 1958 and celebrates the city's agricultural past, which includes cultivating chili peppers, oranges, walnuts and strawberries. Part of the festivities include the cutting of the world's largest strawberry shortcake, carnival rides, food vendors, live music, and a celebrity-filled parade. Numerous Garden Grove organizations, including the Miss Garden Grove Scholarship Program, are part of the Memorial Day weekend festivities every year. In commemoration of Garden Grove's 50th anniversary, the city painted some of its fire hydrants with a design that featured a strawberry, recognizing the festival as a big part of Garden Grove's history.

== Government ==
The mayor is Stephanie Klopfenstein.

Garden Grove uses a council-manager form of government. In July 2015, the city was sued by a resident who claimed that the longstanding at-large elections had affected the Latino vote and was in violation of the California Voting Rights Act. On January 26, 2016, the city council voted to settle the lawsuit, and therefore adopted that council members would be voted by district (six districts total) and no longer at-large; the mayor, however, will continue to be elected at-large. The city council consists of mayor Stephanie Klopfenstein, George S. Brietigam III, Phillip Nguyen, Cindy Ngoc Tran, Joe DoVinh, Yesenia Muneton, and Ariana Arestegui. According to the city's most recent Comprehensive Annual Financial Report, the city's various funds had $206.0 million in revenues, $193.0 million in expenditures, $1,098.9 million in total assets, $251.5 million in total liabilities, and $196.3 million in cash and investments.

=== Federal, state, and county representation ===
In the California State Senate, Garden Grove is split between two districts:

- California's 34th senatorial district, represented by Democrat Tom Umberg since 2018.
- California's 36th senatorial district, represented by Republican Tony Strickland since 2025.

In the California State Assembly, Garden Grove is in the 70th Assembly district, represented by Republican Tri Ta.

In the United States House of Representatives, Garden Grove is in California's 45th congressional district, represented by Democrat Derek Tran.

Additionally, in the Orange County Board of Supervisors, Garden Grove is split between two districts:

- Orange County's 1st district, represented by Janet Nguyen since 2024
- Orange County's 2nd district, represented by Vicente Sarmiento since 2023

=== Politics ===
According to the Orange County Registrar of Voters, as of May 15, 2025, Garden Grove has 94,969 registered voters. Of those, 26,604 (36.56%) are registered Democrats, 21,449 (29.48%) are registered Republicans, and 21,941 (30.15%) have declined to state a political party/are independents. Although Democrat Kamala Harris easily won California and also won Orange County in the 2016 United States Senate election, Democrat Loretta Sanchez easily won Garden Grove by a 67%–33% margin, her widest margin of victory for any city in Orange County.

=== Crime ===
The Uniform Crime Report (UCR), collected annually by the FBI, compiles police statistics from local and state law enforcement agencies across the nation. The UCR records Part I and Part II crimes. Part I crimes become known to law enforcement and are considered the most serious crimes including homicide, rape, robbery, aggravated assault, burglary, larceny, motor vehicle theft, and arson. Part II crimes only include arrest data. The 2023 UCR Data for Garden Grove is listed below:

2023 UCR data
	Aggravated assault	Homicide	Rape	Robbery	Burglary	Larceny theft	Motor vehicle theft	Arson
Garden Grove	189	2	25	88	474	1,544	384	14

== Education ==
The Garden Grove Unified School District (GGUSD) serves most of the city. Other school districts with portions in Garden Grove include: Westminster School District (elementary only) Huntington Beach Union High School District (includes the Westminster SD area), Anaheim Elementary School District, Anaheim Union High School District, and the Orange Unified School District

GGUSD operates the following high schools in Garden Grove:

- Bolsa Grande High School
- Garden Grove High School
- Pacifica High School
- Rancho Alamitos High School
- Santiago High School

King of Kings Christian Academy is an accredited private school (preK–8th grade) associated with the Wisconsin Evangelical Lutheran Synod (WELS) in Garden Grove.

Asahi Gakuen, a part-time Japanese school, leases La Quinta High School in Westminster (another high school operated by GGUSD) on Saturdays for its Orange County campus. Previously Bolsa Grande High, and later Santiago High, housed the Asahi Gakuen Orange County campus.

== Infrastructure ==
=== Transportation ===
The Orange County Transportation Authority (OCTA) operates 15 bus routes servicing 269 stops in Garden Grove.

The OC Streetcar is planned to terminate at Harbor Transit Center at the intersection of Harbor Boulevard and Westminster Avenue. A future stop at the Willowick golf course has also been proposed.

=== Emergency services ===
The Garden Grove Police Department provides law enforcement, with mutual aid assistance offered at times by the Anaheim Police Department's helicopter and the Orange County Sheriff's Department Air Unit.

In August 2019, the city of Garden Grove entered into a 10-year contract with the Orange County Fire Authority (OCFA) for fire and rescue services, and merged all existing Garden Grove Fire Department personnel and equipment into the OCFA.

=== Health care ===
Garden Grove is serviced by two health care facilities:

- Garden Grove Hospital and Medical Center (acute-care hospital)
- Nhan Hoa Comprehensive Healthcare Clinic

=== Water services ===
Water in Garden Grove is supplied by the City of Garden Grove Water Services Division, which sources its water from the Metropolitan Water District of Southern California, importing water from the State Water Project in Northern California and the Colorado River Aqueduct. Additionally, groundwater is supplied by 12 wells tapped into an underground reservoir managed by the Orange County Water District.

== Notable people ==
=== Entertainment ===
- Atreyu, a metalcore band
- Dave Mustaine, guitarist, lead singer, Megadeth
- David J. Peterson, creator of the Dothraki and Valyrian languages from HBO's Game of Thrones
- Dexter Holland, lead singer, The Offspring, also wrote the song "The Kids Aren't Alright" about the city
- Eunice Pringle, actress, notably who accused movie mogul Alexander Pantages in 1929 of rape
- Jennette McCurdy, podcaster, author and actress, iCarly and Sam & Cat
- Justin Chon, actor
- Kevin 'Noodles' Wasserman, lead guitarist, The Offspring
- Kieu Chinh, actress
- Mick Mars, musician and guitarist for Mötley Crüe
- Monique Powell, lead singer, Save Ferris
- Poreotics, dance crew
- Scott Klopfenstein, backup singer, keyboardist, trumpeter and guitarist for the ska-punk band Reel Big Fish
- Shubhendra Shankar, musician, composer and graphic artist
- Steve Martin, actor, comedian, musician and writer; graduate of Garden Grove High School
- Wally George, talk-show host

=== Sports ===
- Alan Trammell, MLB shortstop and manager for the Detroit Tigers
- Amanda Freed, Olympic gold medalist in softball (2004), attended Pacifica High School, Bell Intermediate and Patton Elementary
- Anthony Calvano, soccer player
- Bert Blyleven, Major League Baseball pitcher, Hall of Famer, color commentator, graduate of Santiago High School
- Bobby Crosby, MLB Rookie of the Year (2004), attended Pacifica High School and La Quinta High School
- Coryn Labecki, cyclist
- Craig Paquette, MLB third baseman, graduate of Rancho Alamitos High School
- Darryl Kile, MLB pitcher
- Dennis Sigalos, motorcycle speedway rider, winner of the 1982 Speedway World Pairs Championship
- Ed Caruthers, Olympic silver medalist, 1968 Mexico City. Taught at Bolsa Grande High School.
- Ed Templeton, professional skateboarder and artist
- Gary Hall Sr., Olympic swimmer, silver medalist
- Jeremy Jackson, mixed martial artist
- Leah O'Brien, softball infielder, Olympic gold medalist 1996
- Lenny Dykstra, MLB player with Mets, Phillies; graduate of Garden Grove High School
- Leo Sutherland, MLB player
- Lorrin "Whitey" Harrison, legendary surfer and surfing innovator
- Luis Gil, soccer player
- Mary Decker, runner in National Track and Field Hall of Fame; grew up in Garden Grove
- Matt Treanor, MLB catcher
- Mike Iupati, football player
- Nam Phan, mixed martial artist
- Norm Johnson, NFL kicker
- Randy Vataha, football player at Stanford, Jim Plunkett's favorite receiver
- Troy Polamalu, NFL player with the Pittsburgh Steelers

=== Politics ===
- Bill Thomas, retired US Congressman and former Chairman of the House Ways and Means Committee (and alumnus of Garden Grove High School)
- Curt Pringle, former State Assemblyman, Speaker of the California State Assembly and former mayor of Anaheim
- Janet Nguyen, Orange County supervisor
- Jim Silva, former California Assemblyman, former Member of the Orange County Board of Supervisors, former mayor of Seal Beach
- Paul Jeffrey Watford, Judge of the United States Court of Appeals for the Ninth Circuit, Assumed office May 22, 2012, born in Garden Grove August 25, 1967
- Robert K. Dornan, former US Congressman.

=== Others ===
- Michael A. Monsoor, Navy SEAL, Medal of Honor recipient
- Nicole Brown Simpson, murder victim and former wife of O.J. Simpson
- Robert H. Schuller, television evangelist
- Steve Fossett, aviator and adventurer
- Tibor Rubin, Medal of Honor recipient

== Sister cities ==
- Anyang, South Korea

== See also ==
- Christ Cathedral (Garden Grove, California)
- List of U.S. cities with large Hispanic populations
