= Garden Grove High School =

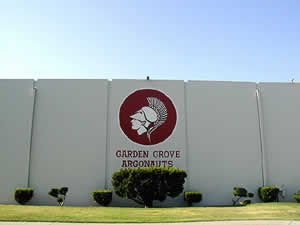
- Garden Grove High School in Garden Grove, California

Location
- 11271 Stanford Avenue; Garden Grove, California 92840; United States; 33°46′43″N 117°56′12″W

Information
- School type: Public
- Motto: "Pride, Performance, and the Pursuit of Excellence"
- Founded: 1921
- Principal: Mary Jane Hibbard
- Teaching staff: 97.58 (FTE)
- Grades: 9-12
- Enrollment: 2,198 (2023-2024)
- Student to teacher ratio: 22.53
- Colors: Red and white
- Athletics conference: CIF Southern Section; Golden West League
- Nickname: Argonauts
- Newspaper: The Argolog
- Website: www.gghs.us

Garden Grove High School is a public high school located in Garden Grove, California. It is a member of the Garden Grove Unified School District and serves the northeast portion of the city and a small portion of southern Anaheim.

== History ==
The Garden Grove Union High School District was established in 1921 in response to attempts by neighboring school districts to annex the Garden Grove area. GGHS opened its doors in September 1921 in temporary facilities. The school moved to its present location on Stanford Avenue in 1923.

The school's athletic teams were originally known as "Chili Peppers", reflecting the dominant local crop of the time. In the 1920s, the name "Argonauts" was chosen. They are known as Argos for short.

GGHS was badly damaged by the 1933 Long Beach earthquake; the main classroom building suffered a partial collapse and one student was killed. The structure was rebuilt and is still in use, having been renamed Heritage Hall. It also houses the Argonaut Hall of Fame and Museum, chronicling the school's long history, as well as a memorial to Michael Monsoor, a United States Navy SEAL killed in Iraq and posthumously awarded the Medal of Honor, and an alumnus of Garden Grove High School.

GGHS grew with the post-World War II boom and by the 1960s, it was joined by six other high schools in what is now the Garden Grove Unified School District.

In the 2004–2005 and 2018–2019 school years, Garden Grove High School was named a California Distinguished School.

In September 2021, Garden Grove High School celebrated 100 years of establishment.

== Athletics ==
The Argonauts made the CIF Southern Section Football finals in 2009, but lost. The Argonauts won their first CIF Southern Section Football title in 2010 as champions of the Southern Division, and their second, came in 2014 against cross-city rival Rancho Alamitos. Other Southern Section CIF titles won by the school include coed badminton (1986, 1995 and 1999), girls' field hockey (1979, 1982, and 1983), and girls' softball (1985). Wrestler Nathan Tran made the California State Tournament for Wrestling in Bakersfield, in 2018, for the first time since the 1990s.

== Performing arts ==
Garden Grove High School offers music courses in marching band, concert band, beginning instruments, jazz band, and beginning and advanced string orchestra. Each year during Memorial Day weekend, the Argonaut Marching Band and Colorguard act as host band in the Strawberry Festival Parade in Garden Grove, California.

== Notable alumni ==
=== Arts ===
- James Intveld, Class of 1977, musician and actor
- Steve Martin, Class of 1963, comedian, actor, screenwriter, and author
- John McEuen, musician, founding member of the Nitty Gritty Dirt Band
- Dustin Nguyen, actor, director, writer, and martial artist
- Basil Poledouris, Class of 1963, film and television composer
- Stephen Shortridge, Class of 1970, actor
- Clint Walker, Class of 1991, publisher, writer, editor and photographer

=== Sports ===
- Mark Baker, Class of 1979, professional bowler on the PBA Tour, 1982–1991
- Al Carlson, Class of 1969, NBA player, center, 1975–76 with the Seattle SuperSonics
- Lenny Dykstra, Class of 1981, Major League Baseball player, outfielder, 1985–96 with the New York Mets and Philadelphia Phillies
- Roy Gleason, Class of 1961, Major League Baseball player and Bonus Baby, outfielder, 1963 with Los Angeles Dodgers, only Major League Baseball player to serve in combat in the Vietnam War
- Merle Hapes, Class of 1938, NFL player, fullback, 1942 and 1946 with the New York Giants
- Mark Lomas, Class of 1966, NFL Player, defensive lineman, 1970–74 with the New York Jets
- Mike Schooler, Class of 1980, Major League Baseball player, pitcher, 1988–93 with the Seattle Mariners and Texas Rangers

=== Business, politics, and the military ===
- Steve Fossett, Class of 1962, businessman, aviator, sailor and adventurer; first person to circumnavigate the globe solo in a balloon
- Michael Monsoor, Class of 1999, United States Navy SEAL killed in Iraq and posthumously awarded the Medal of Honor
- Janet Nguyen, Class of 1994, Garden Grove city councilwoman, member of Orange County Board of Supervisors, and State Senator
- Bill Thomas, Class of 1959, 11-term U.S. congressman (now retired) and chairman of the House Ways and Means Committee
