= Garden Grove Unified School District =

School district in California, United States

Address
- 10331 Stanford Avenue Garden Grove, Orange County, California, 92844; United States
- Coordinates: 33.7782°N 117.9545°W

District information
- Type: Public
- Grades: Pre-K through 12^{th}
- Established: 1965; 61 years ago
- President: Walter Muñeton
- Vice-president: Teri Rocco
- Superintendent: Gabriela Mafi
- Schools: 70: Elementary: 48; Intermediate: 10; High school: 8; Special education: 2; Adult education: 1; Career technical education: 1
- NCES District ID: 0614880

Students and staff
- Enrollment: 44,223 (2016–17)
- Teachers: 1,833.15 FTE
- Student–teacher ratio: 24.12

Other information
- Website: www.ggusd.us
- Location of the district office (blue map pin) within Orange County (shown in orange).

The Garden Grove Unified School District (GGUSD) is the 14th-largest school district in California as well as the third largest school district in Orange County. It includes boundaries in Anaheim, Cypress, Fountain Valley, Garden Grove, Santa Ana, Stanton, and Westminster.

The district includes forty-eight elementary schools, ten intermediate schools, eight high schools, two special education schools, and two continuation schools.

It was formed in July 1965 from the merger of three districts: the Garden Grove Elementary School District (established 1875), the Alamitos School District (1880s) and the Garden Grove Union High School District (1921).

In 2004, the district received the Broad Prize for Urban Education. Twice before, it had been a Broad Prize finalist.

GGUSD historically ranks well above state averages on Smarter Balanced assessments, which are part of California's statewide student performance testing program. In 2023, GGUSD ranked highest among CORE Districts on Smarter Balanced assessment results.

In 2017, the GGUSD Board of Education announced that it would launch its Vietnamese dual immersion program the following year at John Murdy Elementary School, becoming the fourth school district in the United States to do so.

The district superintendent is Dr. Gabriela Mafi.

== Career and technical education ==
- CTE

== Adult education ==
- LEC Adult Education

== Special education ==
- The Adult Transition Program at Jordan
- Special Education Center at Mark Twain

== High schools ==
- Bolsa Grande High School
- Garden Grove High School
- Hare Continuation High School
- La Quinta High School
- Los Amigos High School
- Pacifica High School
- Rancho Alamitos High School
- Santiago High School

== Intermediate schools ==
- Alamitos Intermediate
- Bell Intermediate
- Doig Intermediate
- Fitz Intermediate Computer Science Adcademy
- Irvine Intermediate
- Jordan Intermediate
- Lake Intermediate
- McGarvin Intermediate
- Ralston Intermediate
- Walton Intermediate

== Preschool and Elementary schools ==
- Ethan Allen Elementary
- Anthony Elementary
- Barker Elementary
- Brookhurst Elementary
- Bryant Elementary
- Carrillo Elementary
- Carver Early Childhood Education
- Clinton Elementary
- Clinton Corner Family Campus
- Cook Elementary
- Crosby Elementary
- Eisenhower Elementary
- Enders Elementary
- Evans Elementary
- Excelsior Elementary
- Faylane Elementary
- Garden Park Elementary
- Gilbert Elementary
- Hazard Elementary
- Heritage Elementary Computer Science Immersion Academy
- Merton E. Hill Elementary
- Lawrence Elementary
- Marshall Elementary
- Mitchell Elementary
- Monroe Elementary Language Academy
- Morningside Elementary
- Murdy Elementary
- Newhope Elementary
- Northcutt Elementary
- Paine Elementary
- Palomino Elementary
- Parkview Elementary
- Patton Elementary
- Peters K-3 Elementary
- Peters 4-6 Elementary
- Post Elementary
- Riverdale Elementary
- Russell Elementary Language Academy
- Simmons Elementary
- Skylark Preschool
- Stanford Elementary
- Stanley Elementary
- Sunnyside Elementary
- Violette Elementary
- Wakeham Elementary
- Warren Elementary
- Woodbury Elementary
- Zeyen Elementary

== Governance ==
Garden Grove Unified School District is governed by a Board of Education that includes five trustee members. The trustees are elected by voters in each of their respective districts, also referred to as areas. The current trustees of GGUSD are:

Current GGUSD Board of Education Trustees
Area	Name	Since
1	Terri Rocco	2016
2	Lan Quoc Nguyen	2002
3	Walter Muneton	2016
4	Bob Harden	1994
5	Dina Nguyen	2016
