= Pacifica High School (Garden Grove, California) =

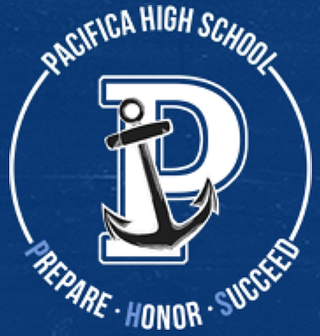

Location
- 6851 Lampson Avenue; Garden Grove, California 92845; United States; 33°46′53″N 118°0′49″W

Information
- Type: Public
- Established: 1965
- School district: Garden Grove Unified School District
- Superintendent: Gabriela Mafi
- Principal: Steve Osborne
- Teaching staff: 75.62 (FTE)
- Enrollment: 1,640 (2023–2024)
- Student to teacher ratio: 21.69
- Colors: Black, white and blue
- Athletics conference: Empire League
- Mascot: Sea (Bull)Dog
- Nickname: Mariners
- Yearbook: The Reef
- Website: School website
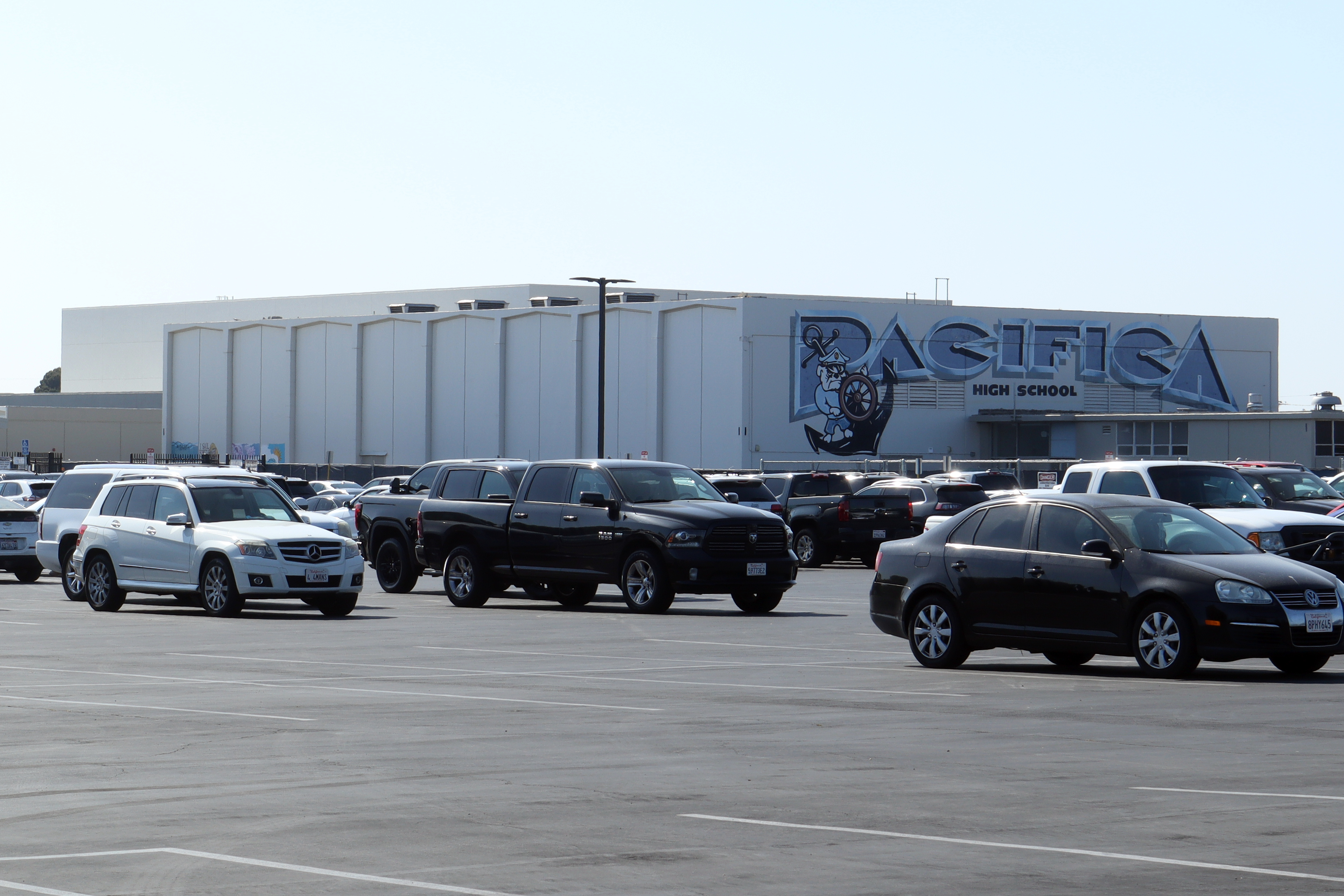
- Theater and Media Center

Pacifica High School is a high school in Garden Grove, California, United States, within the Garden Grove Unified School District. It opened in 1965 and has enrolled more than two thousand students yearly. The communities serving Pacifica are western Garden Grove and sections of Stanton and Cypress.

== Campus ==
A campus landmark is a Navy anchor in the quad. At first painted blue but repainted black in 2011, the anchor was donated by the U.S Navy. On May 1, 2021, a new gym opened. The new gymnasium is a state-of-the-art building that is an 18,250-square foot multi-function facility that houses three full-size basketball courts and can convert to nine volleyball courts. The gym allows for seating for up to 1,584 people and includes a lobby, locker rooms, coach's offices, equipment storage, and more. The first shot was made by Freshman coach Mike Buneafe, whose grandfather, Al Buneafe founded Pacifica High school.

== Athletics ==
Pacifica's sports teams, the Mariners, compete in the Empire League of the California Interscholastic Federation's Southern Section. Before 2006, they competed in the Garden Grove League with the other schools in the district.

Sports offerings are:

- Football (boys)
- Cross Country (coed)
- Tennis (coed)
- Volleyball (coed)
- Waterpolo (coed)
- Basketball (coed)
- Soccer (coed)
- Wrestling (boys)
- Baseball (boys)
- Softball (girls)
- Swim (coed)
- Track (coed)
- Golf (coed)
- Flag Football (girls)

== Marching band and drumline ==
In 2003 and from 2005 through 2009, the Pacifica marching band's drumline took the Southern California Percussion Alliance gold medal, and from 2006 through 2009, it garnered the Winter Guard International World Championship gold medal in the Percussion Scholastic Open division, along with numerous first-place finishes throughout Southern California. Pacifica also finished with a Percussion Alliance bronze medal in 2004 and a Winter Guard International silver medal in 2005. The Pacifica drumline is the second ensemble to have captured four consecutive WGI World Championship golds.

== Notable alumni ==
- Danny Barber, professional soccer player
- Pam Bileck, Olympics gymnast
- Alyssa Brito, softball player
- Jeff Carlson, professional football player
- Jon Dorenbos, professional football player and magician
- Michelle Dusserre, Olympics gymnast
- Larry Fortensky, construction worker, husband of actress Elizabeth Taylor
- Amanda Freed, Olympics softball player
- Dexter Holland, Offspring lead singer and guitarist
- Norm Johnson, professional football player
- Greg Kriesel, Offspring bass player
- Terry Kubicka, Olympics figure skating
- Joey Ortiz, Major League Baseball player
- David J. Peterson, professional language creator
- Monique Powell, lead singer of the band Save Ferris
- Jared Rushton, actor in Big and Honey I Shrunk the Kids
- Shannel, drag queen
- Jeffree Star, YouTuber
- Kevin "Noodles" Wasserman, Offspring guitarist
