= Santiago High School (Garden Grove, California) =

Location
- 12342 Trask Ave, Garden Grove, CA 92843; Garden Grove, Orange County, California 92843-2812; 33.76605°N 117.91424°W

Information
- School type: Public High School
- Established: 1961; 65 years ago
- School board: Garden Grove Unified School District
- Principal: Nick Clark
- Staff: 87.27 (FTE)
- Grades: 9–12
- Enrollment: 1,557 (2025-2026)
- Student to teacher ratio: 20.64
- Colors: Purple and white
- Mascot: Cavalier
- Website: www.santiagohs.org

Santiago High School is a high school located in Garden Grove, California, and is a member of the Garden Grove Unified School District. The school's athletic teams are known as the Cavaliers. Santiago High School has been an AVID National Demonstration School since 2007 and an AVID Schoolwide Site of Distinction since 2016.

== Enrollment ==
The total enrollment of Santiago High School was 1,557 students for the 2025-26 school year.

== Notable alumni ==
- Bert Blyleven (class of 1969) – Major League pitcher; member of the MLB Hall of Fame.
- Eddie Bravo- Brazilian Jiu Jitsu black belt Founder of 10th Planet Jiu Jitsu
- Brittany Ishibashi - Actress

== Athletics ==
Santiago hosts a range of sports including tennis, basketball, baseball, football, soccer, swim, track and field, volleyball and cross country. Practices take place every week with differing times and days depending on season, sport, and projected weather. Occasional tournaments are also held once in a while.

== Programs ==
Santiago High School has a wide range of programs and electives for its students such as JROTC, band, choir, art, culinary, drama, avid, world languages, automechanic, robotics, engineering design, computer science, and more. Most of these programs have associated events, clubs, or higher levels such as "AP" or "college articulation" or "1P" and "2P".
