= La Quinta High School (Westminster, California) =

Public secondary school in Westminster, Orange County, California, United States

Location
- 10372 McFadden Ave. Westminster, California; 33.7365°N 117.9483°W

Information
- Type: Public
- Established: 1963
- Principal: Denise Kirkman
- Staff: 87.42 (on an FTE basis)
- Grades: 9–12
- Enrollment: 2,041 (2024–2025)
- Student to teacher ratio: 23.35
- Colors: Blue and gold
- Mascot: Aztec
- Website: laquintahs.org

La Quinta High School (LQHS) is a public high school located in Westminster, Orange County, California, is one of seven high-schools of the Garden Grove Unified School District.

== History ==
La Quinta High School was founded in 1963, the fifth high school to be founded in the Garden Grove Unified School District. In the late 1980s and early 1990s, La Quinta gained notoriety for expressed racial tensions between those of Asian and Hispanic/Latino descent. In 1994, La Quinta was known for a tuberculosis outbreak of 106 students and faculty who tested positive, and subsequent quick response and compliance with county public health officials. In 2009, La Quinta again made headlines for student demonstrations in support of a teacher allegedly abused by the high school's administration.

== Administration and organization ==
The La Quinta mascot is an Aztec. La Quinta's principal is Denise Kirkman.

The structure of the school is divided into seven main buildings as well as several portable classrooms. To the north of campus are the 100, 200 and 300 buildings. The 100 building holds most English classrooms, the 200 is mostly social science classrooms and 300 building specializes in world languages and special education. To the east are the 600 building for art, business and Vietnamese, 700 building for science classes, and the 800 building which houses most of the math classes. The 400 building to the south houses weight rooms and classrooms for miscellaneous subjects, such as art, music, band and computer graphics. The 500 buildings, which are seven portable rooms to the south of the 400 building and west of the gym, house mainly social science classrooms. Students traverse the campus through the space between buildings, known as "the quad." The student store, located in the 100 building, is the center of the school's activities. The school library and performing arts center are on the west side of the campus. In front of the library is the cafeteria. The gym and pool facility are to the south of the 500 portables.

The fields south and west of the main campus have courts for sports such as basketball, soccer, track and field, tennis, football, softball and baseball.

Asahi Gakuen, a part-time Japanese school, leases La Quinta on Saturdays for its Orange County campus.

== Student body ==
There are about 2,000 students, grades 9th-12th, who reside in Westminster, Garden Grove, Fountain Valley, and Santa Ana. In 2024–2025 La Quinta's student demographic breakdown was as follows; 75% Asian, 19% Hispanic, 4% White, and 2% two or more races.

== Music Department ==
La Quinta High School has a marching band, known as the La Quinta High School Marching Aztecs.

The band competes in Class 3A of the WBA (Western Band Association) circuit and Class 3A of CSBC (California State Band Championships) as of 2022 and placed 4th overall in the 2017 WBA Grand Championships for classes 1A, 2A, and 3A. They have previously competed in Class 5A of the SCJA (Southern California Judging Association) circuit and advanced to the California State Band Championships from 2010 to 2014. They have earned second place (overall band) and high percussion in Division 4A at the CSBC (California State Band Championships) in 2013 and continued on to earn fourth place (overall) with both high percussion and high auxiliary for the first time in Division 5A in 2014. In 2017, La Quinta's Drumline made it to SCPA (Southern California Performing Arts) Finals for the first time and achieved second place. The year after, they won first place with their show "Going Home".

Along with Marching and Symphonic Band, La Quinta High School offers other music classes such as Concert Choir and String Orchestra.

The Vocal Ensemble and the Zero Period Advanced Orchestra have earned Superior ratings at festivals throughout Southern California.

== Electives ==
La Quinta has two elective departments: Fine Arts and Business. Fine arts students win numerous awards each year for their projects. La Quinta has one of the largest Business departments in Orange County, California; it offers classes to obtain either an Accounting Certificate or Business Ownership Certificate as a supplement to college applications or resumes.

== Notable alumni ==
- Brent Kutzle, American musician best known for playing the bass guitar and cello for the band OneRepublic
- Bobby Crosby, former Major League Baseball (MLB) shortstop
- Brandon Laird, former MLB third baseman for the New York Yankees & Houston Astros, currently playing for the Chiba Lotte Marines
- Gerald Laird, MLB catcher who is currently a free agent
- Ian Kennedy, MLB pitcher for the Texas Rangers
- Michael Peri, military intelligence electronic warfare signals analyst, convicted of espionage in 1989
- Ian Stewart, former MLB third baseman
- Joon Park, Korean-American singer, actor and leader of the Korean pop group g.o.d
- Christian Ramirez, professional soccer player
- Jamie Subandhi, Olympic badminton player
- Oscar Munoz, CEO, United Airlines
