= Coyote Hills =

Coyote Hills may refer to:

- Coyote Hills (Alameda County), California, USA
  - Coyote Hills Regional Park
- Coyote Hills, Orange County, California, consists of:
  - East Coyote Hills, Orange County, California, USA
  - West Coyote Hills, Orange County, California, USA
- Coyote Hills (Plumas County), California, USA
- Coyote Hills, Baker County, Oregon, USA

== See also ==
- Coyote Mountains, California, USA
- Coyote Mountains (Arizona), USA
