= Buena Park, California =

City in California, United States

- City
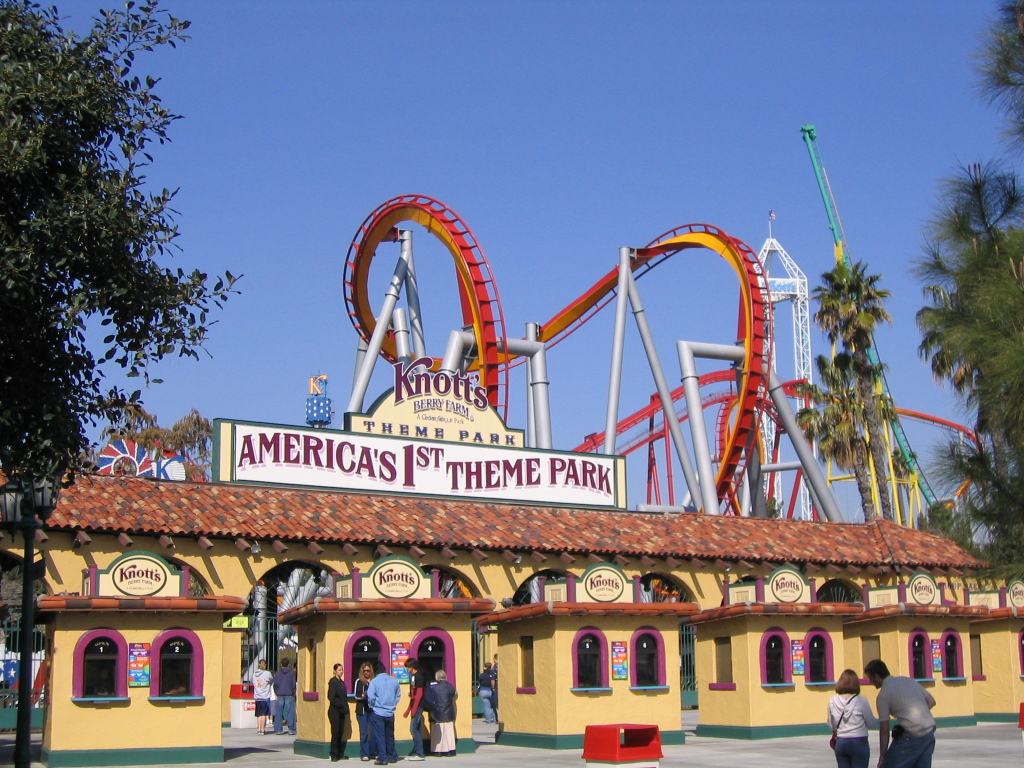
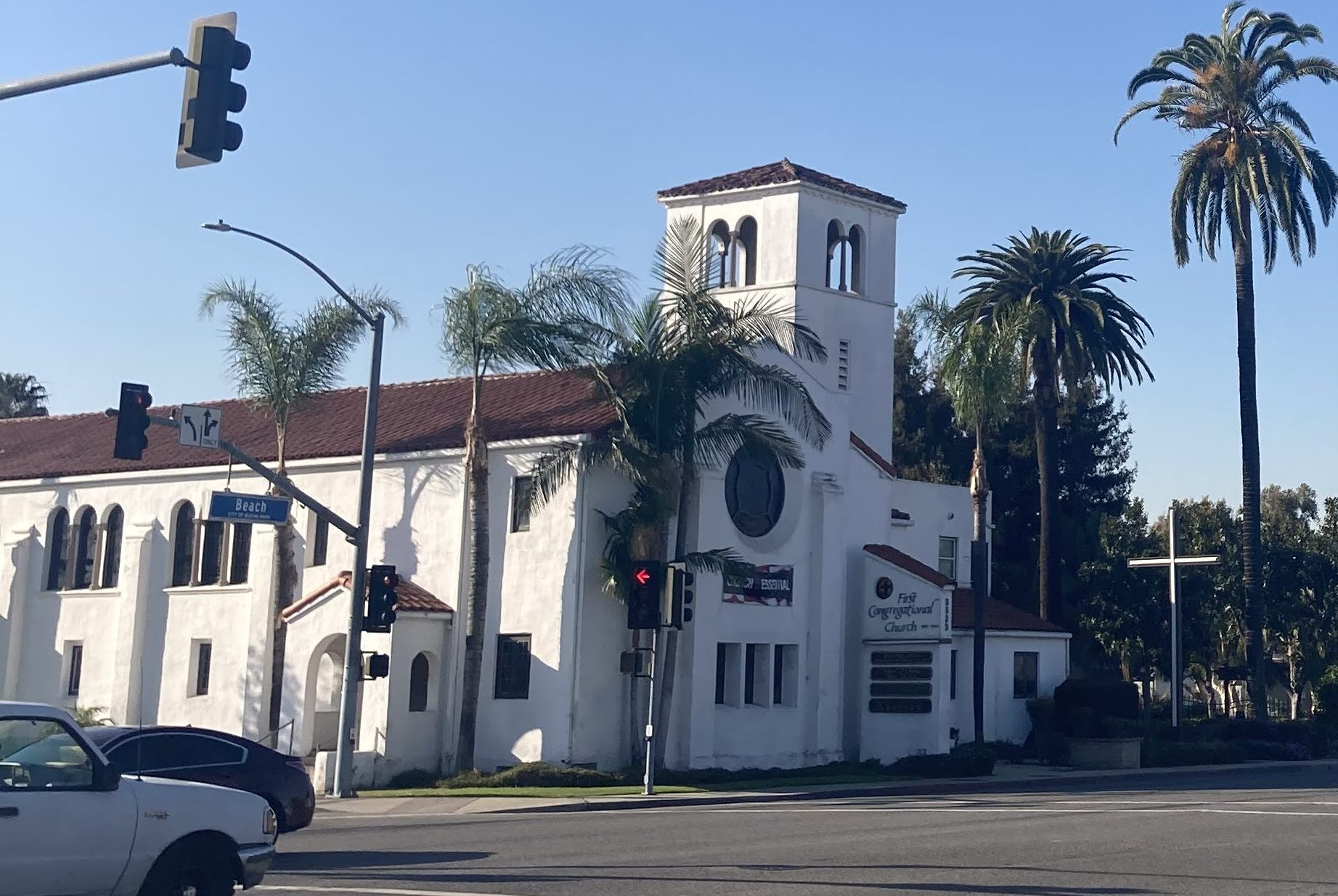
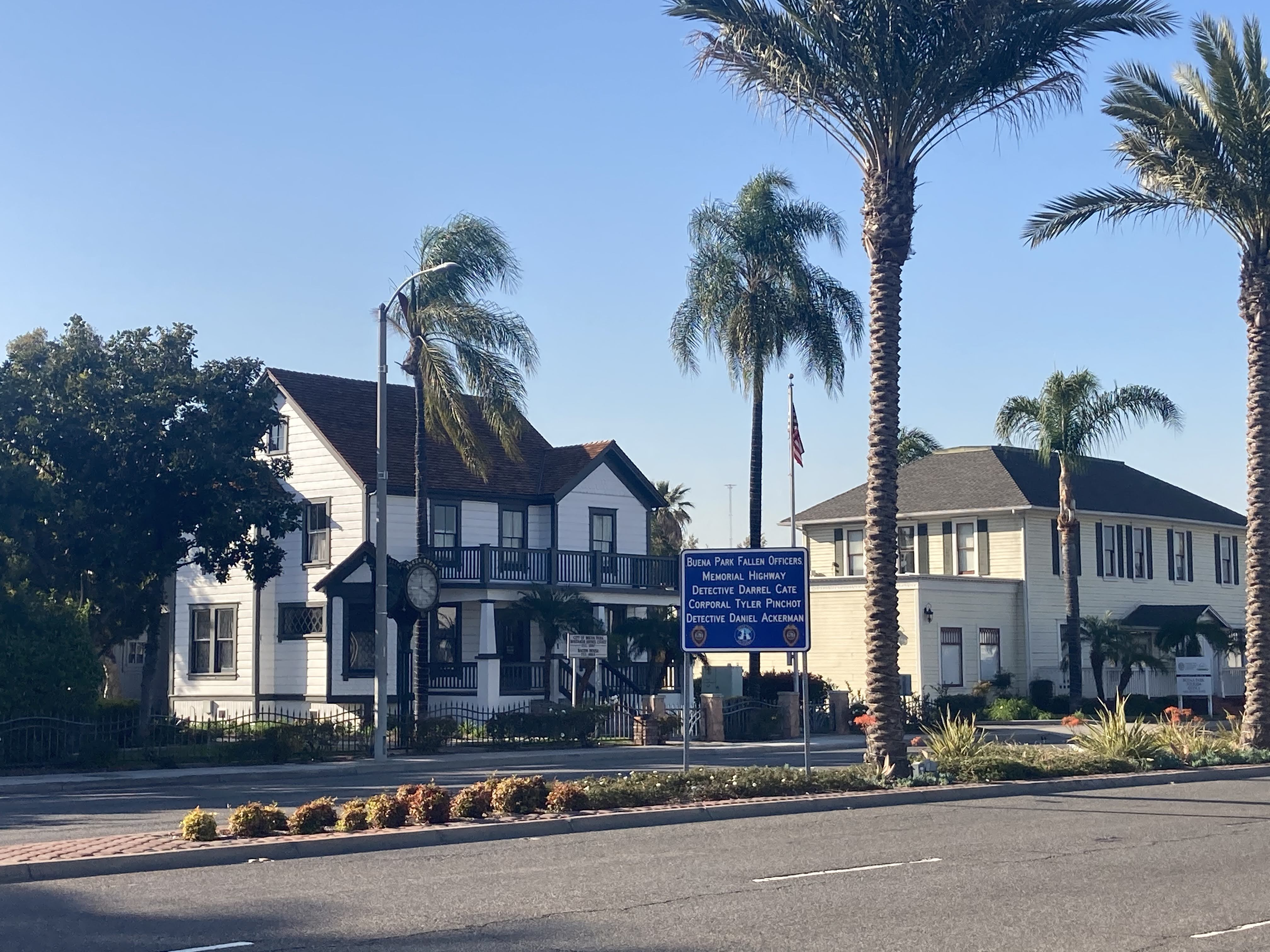
- Knott's Berry Farm First Congregational Church Buena Park Historical District

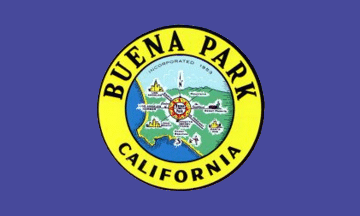
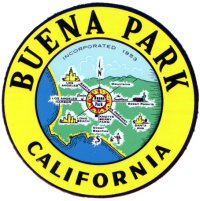
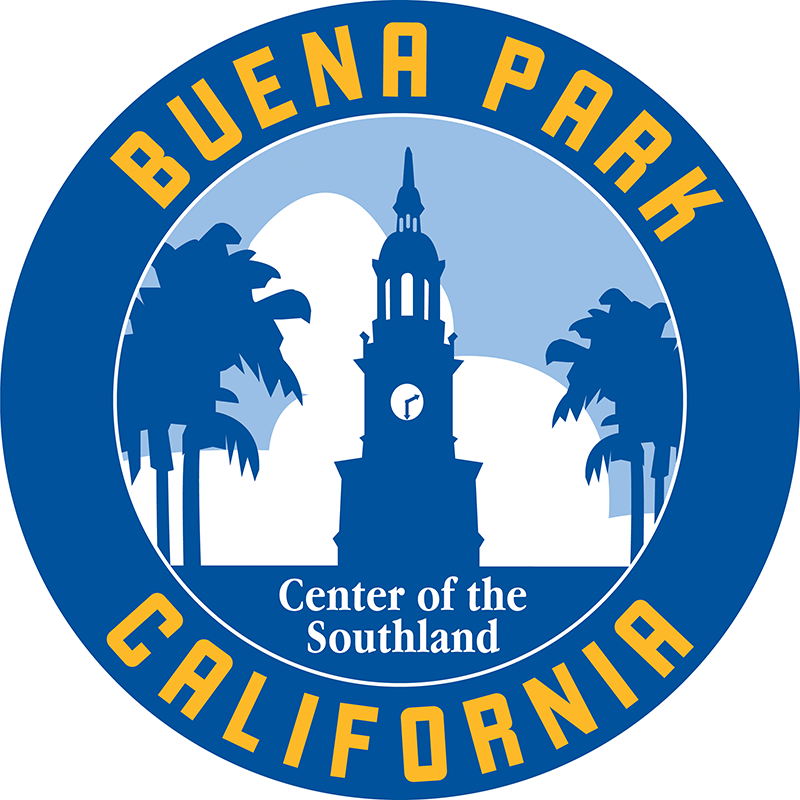
- Flag Seal Logo
- Motto: "Center of the Southland"
- Interactive map of Buena Park, California
- Location in the United States
- Coordinates: 33°51′22″N 118°0′15″W
- Country: United States
- State: California
- County: Orange
- Founded: 1887
- Incorporated: January 27, 1953

Government
  - Type: Council-Manager
  - Mayor: Connor Traut
  - Vice Mayor: Lamiya Hoque
  - City council: Carlos Franco; Susan Sonne; Joyce Ahn
  - City manager: Aaron France

Area
  - Total: 10.56 sq mi (27.34 km^{2})
  - Land: 10.53 sq mi (27.27 km^{2})
  - Water: 0.027 sq mi (0.07 km^{2}) 0.28%
- Elevation: 75 ft (23 m)

Population (2020)
  - Total: 84,034
  - Density: 7,980.9/sq mi (3,081.44/km^{2})
- Time zone: UTC−8 (Pacific)
  - Summer (DST): UTC−7 (PDT)
- ZIP codes: 90620–90624
- Area code: 714/657, 562
- FIPS code: 06-08786
- GNIS feature IDs: 1652676, 2409932
- Website: www.buenapark.com

Buena Park is a city in northern Orange County, California, United States. As of the 2020 census its population was 84,034. It is the location of several tourist attractions, including Knott's Berry Farm. It is about 12 miles (19 km) northwest of downtown Santa Ana, the county seat, and is within the Los Angeles metropolitan area.

== History ==
=== Indigenous ===
The area of Buena Park was the site of the Tongva village known as Juyubit. The village was located alongside Coyote Creek at the foot of the West Coyote Hills. It was consistently recorded as one of the largest villages in Tovaangar. Being established alongside creeks in a valley, the village prospered. Oak trees provided acorns, while native grasses and sage bushes regularly produced seeds. Rabbit and mule deer were common sources of meat. Juyubit was a center for trade through a series of trails with coastal and mountain villages.

=== Spanish era ===
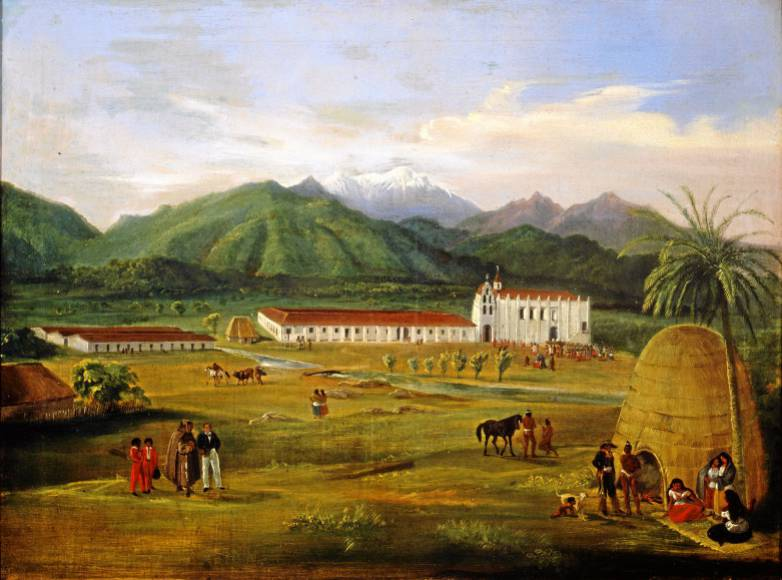
Many villagers from Juyubit, which was located a present-day Buena Park, were brought to Mission San Gabriel in the Spanish era (pictured).

The Spanish established the nearby Mission San Gabriel in 1771. Hundreds of villagers from Juyubit were brought to the mission for conversion to Christianity and to work as laborers on the mission's grounds. Many of the villagers died quickly, with the high death rate at the mission and three of every four newborns dying before reaching the age of two.

Dissatisfaction with the poor conditions at the missions led to a revolt in 1785–1786 led by Toypurina, a medicine woman. Villagers from Juyubit were involved in the revolt, which did not succeed in ousting the Spanish. A few years after the revolt, a woman from Juyubit, Eulalia María, was baptized at the age of six. She became a godmother to as an adult before her death in 1818.

Spanish settlers began to establish larger settlements on ranchos by land grants made by the King of Spain. Manuel Nieto of the Portolà expeditions received a grant in 1783, which was divided by his heirs into five separate ranchos in 1834. One of them, 46,806-acre (189.42 km^{2}) Rancho Los Coyotes, included the current site of the City of Buena Park. The rancho's adobe headquarters lay on what is now Los Coyotes Country Club's golf course.

The area was transferred from Spanish authority to Mexican rule in 1822 and ceded to the United States in 1848 at the end of the Mexican–American War. California was granted statehood in 1850.

=== American era ===
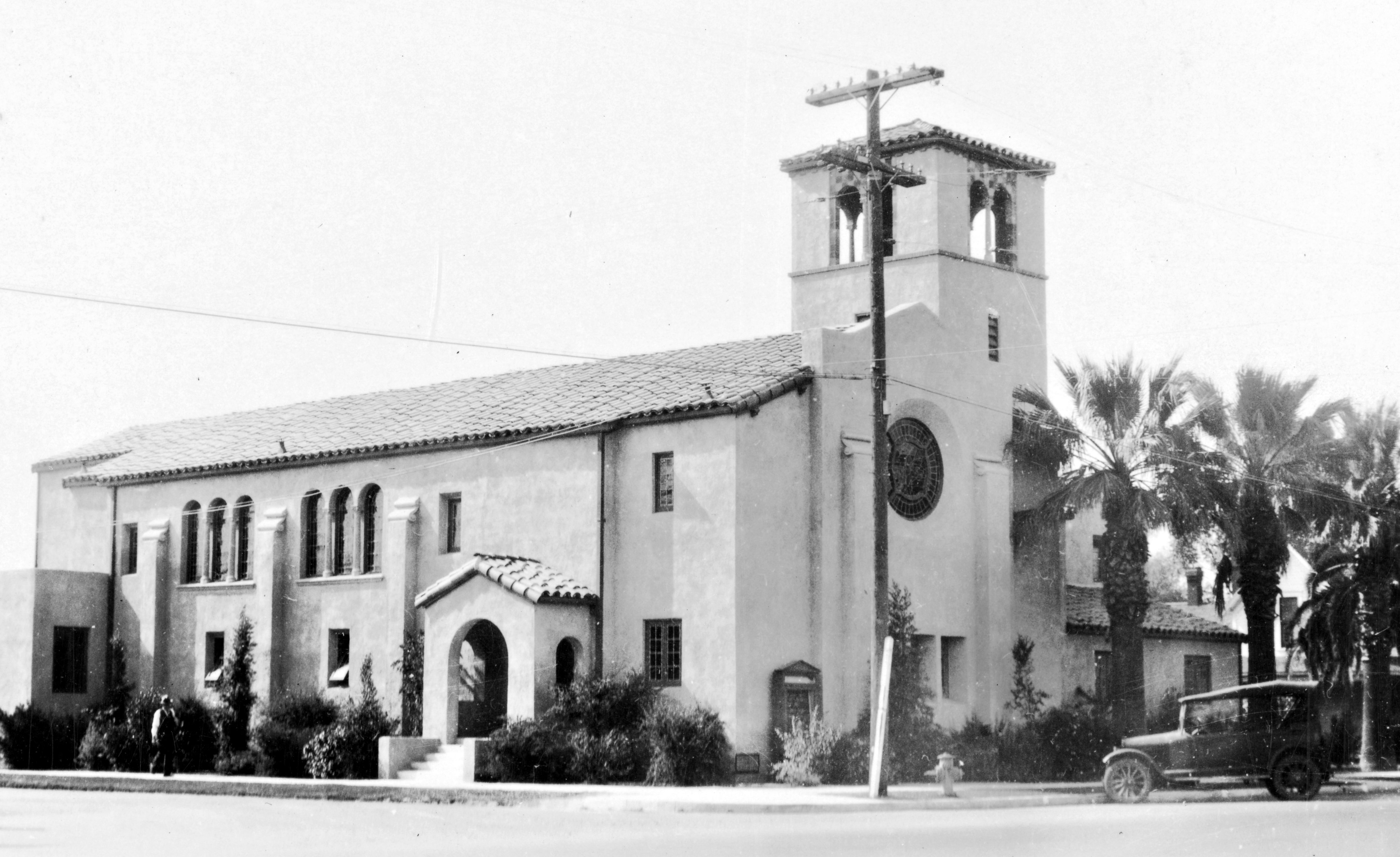
Buena Park in the 1920s.

Americanization further expanded in the area after completion of the transcontinental railroad in 1869 and its connection to Los Angeles in 1875. By then, Abel Stearns had acquired Rancho Los Coyotes in consideration for loans made to Pio and Andrés Pico. In 1885, James A. Whitaker, a wholesale grocer from Chicago, purchased 690 acres (2.8 km^{2}) of this land from Stearns. In 1887, Whitaker founded the City of Buena Park in conjunction with the railway development of what we now know as Orange County.

The exact derivation of the name Buena Park is uncertain. One theory is that Whitaker used the name of a Chicago suburb: Buena Park, Chicago, Illinois, although the community in Illinois was also named in 1887. Another theory relates to the artesian well and its park-like grounds once located at the current intersection of what are now Artesia and Beach Boulevards. Local settlers referred to the area as "Plaza Buena" which means "good park" in Spanish.

The city was incorporated on January 27, 1953. An agricultural center when founded (particularly dairy, wine and citrus products), Buena Park is now primarily a residential suburb and commercial hub.

The Murder of Stuart Tay occurred in 1992.

In 2009, the body of swimsuit model and reality TV star Jasmine Fiore was found stuffed in a suitcase and dumped in an apartment building dumpster near the 7400 block of Franklin Street in northern Buena Park by a resident searching for recyclables.

== Points of interest ==
Buena Park's E-Zone district, located along Beach Boulevard, is home to several well-known tourist destinations: the venerable Knott's Berry Farm theme park and its sister water park Knott's Soak City, Pirate's Dinner Adventure Show, and a Medieval Times dinner show. The E-Zone has also been home to the Movieland Wax Museum, one of the largest of its kind in the world until it closed in 2005; a Ripley's Believe It or Not! museum that closed on March 30, 2009; and the Japanese Village and Deer Park on Knott Avenue.

Los Coyotes Country Club, located in the northeast of the city, boasts a 27-hole championship course originally designed by Billy Bell in 1957 and redesigned by Ted Robinson in 1998. The Los Coyotes LPGA Classic golf tournament has been hosted there.

The 105-acre Ralph B. Clark Regional Park (originally Los Coyotes Regional Park), nestled at the foot of the West Coyote Hills, is one of Orange County's prominent parks. Opened in 1981, it is home to an amphitheater, nature trails, and a stocked fishing pond, as well as the Interpretive Center, a small museum which features ice age fossil and local geology exhibits.

A Nabisco factory on Artesia Boulevard was known for many years as a Buena Park landmark. The red "Nabisco" sign was visible from the I-5 Freeway, and visitors to the town could often smell cookies. The factory produced Honey Maid graham crackers, Ritz Crackers, and Nilla Wafers, among other Nabisco products, before shutting down in 2006.

The Source OC retail experience opened in 2017. This place is located north of Knott's Berry Farm.

== Geography and climate ==
According to the United States Census Bureau, the city has a total area of 10.6 square miles (27 km^{2}). 10.5 square miles (27 km^{2}) of it is land and 0.03 square miles (0.078 km^{2}) of it (0.28%) is water. One of the things Buena Park residents are proud of is that Buena Park is considered the center of the southland.

Buena Park is bisected by State Route 91 into North Buena Park and South Buena Park. It is bordered by Fullerton on the east, Anaheim on the southeast, Cypress on the southwest, Cerritos and La Palma on the west, and La Mirada on the north.

Climate data for Buena Park, California
| Month | Jan | Feb | Mar | Apr | May | Jun | Jul | Aug | Sep | Oct | Nov | Dec | Year |
|---|---|---|---|---|---|---|---|---|---|---|---|---|---|
| Record high °F (°C) | 93 (34) | 91 (33) | 98 (37) | 105 (41) | 104 (40) | 109 (43) | 109 (43) | 105 (41) | 111 (44) | 111 (44) | 101 (38) | 92 (33) | 111 (44) |
| Mean daily maximum °F (°C) | 70 (21) | 70 (21) | 73 (23) | 76 (24) | 80 (27) | 85 (29) | 90 (32) | 91 (33) | 89 (32) | 83 (28) | 76 (24) | 69 (21) | 79 (26) |
| Mean daily minimum °F (°C) | 48 (9) | 49 (9) | 51 (11) | 54 (12) | 59 (15) | 63 (17) | 67 (19) | 68 (20) | 65 (18) | 60 (16) | 53 (12) | 47 (8) | 57 (14) |
| Record low °F (°C) | 25 (−4) | 33 (1) | 33 (1) | 38 (3) | 40 (4) | 46 (8) | 51 (11) | 52 (11) | 50 (10) | 39 (4) | 34 (1) | 28 (−2) | 25 (−4) |
| Average precipitation inches (mm) | 3.03 (77) | 3.25 (83) | 2.16 (55) | 0.87 (22) | 0.25 (6.4) | 0.09 (2.3) | 0.04 (1.0) | 0.05 (1.3) | 0.24 (6.1) | 0.75 (19) | 1.10 (28) | 2.05 (52) | 13.88 (353) |

== Demographics ==
Historical population
| Census | Pop. | Note | %± |
|---|---|---|---|
| 1960 | 46,401 | | — |
| 1970 | 63,646 | | 37.2% |
| 1980 | 64,165 | | 0.8% |
| 1990 | 68,784 | | 7.2% |
| 2000 | 78,282 | | 13.8% |
| 2010 | 80,530 | | 2.9% |
| 2020 | 84,034 | | 4.4% |
| 2024 (est.) | 82,611 | ▼ | −1.7% |
U.S. Decennial Census; 1860–1870 1880-1890; 1900 1910 1920; 1930 1940 1950; 1960 1970 1980; 1990 2000 2010; 2020

Buena Park was first listed as an unincorporated community in the 1950 U.S. census as part of unincorporated Anaheim Township; and listed as a city in the 1960 U.S. census.

=== Racial and ethnic composition ===
Buena Park city, California – Racial and ethnic composition Note: the US Census treats Hispanic/Latino as an ethnic category. This table excludes Latinos from the racial categories and assigns them to a separate category. Hispanics/Latinos may be of any race.
| Race / Ethnicity (NH = Non-Hispanic) | Pop 1980 | Pop 1990 | Pop 2000 | Pop 2010 | Pop 2020 | % 1980 | % 1990 | % 2000 | % 2010 | % 2020 |
|---|---|---|---|---|---|---|---|---|---|---|
| White alone (NH) | 48,883 | 40,298 | 29,885 | 22,302 | 16,331 | 76.18% | 58.59% | 38.18% | 27.69% | 19.43% |
| Black or African American alone (NH) | 686 | 1,640 | 2,826 | 2,809 | 2,504 | 1.07% | 2.38% | 3.61% | 3.49% | 2.98% |
| Native American or Alaska Native alone (NH) | 441 | 406 | 315 | 188 | 174 | 0.69% | 0.59% | 0.40% | 0.23% | 0.21% |
| Asian alone (NH) | 2,628 | 5,979 | 16,338 | 21,232 | 27,499 | 4.10% | 8.69% | 20.87% | 26.37% | 32.72% |
| Native Hawaiian or Pacific Islander alone (NH) | 2,628 | 5,979 | 358 | 389 | 373 | 4.10% | 8.69% | 0.46% | 0.48% | 0.44% |
| Other race alone (NH) | 112 | 114 | 154 | 139 | 345 | 0.17% | 0.17% | 0.20% | 0.17% | 0.41% |
| Mixed race or Multiracial (NH) | x | x | 2,185 | 1,833 | 2,478 | x | x | 2.79% | 2.28% | 2.95% |
| Hispanic or Latino (any race) | 11,415 | 16,879 | 26,221 | 31,638 | 34,330 | 17.79% | 24.53% | 33.50% | 39.29% | 40.85% |
| Total | 64,165 | 68,784 | 78,282 | 80,530 | 84,034 | 100.00% | 100.00% | 100.00% | 100.00% | 100.00% |

=== 2020 census ===
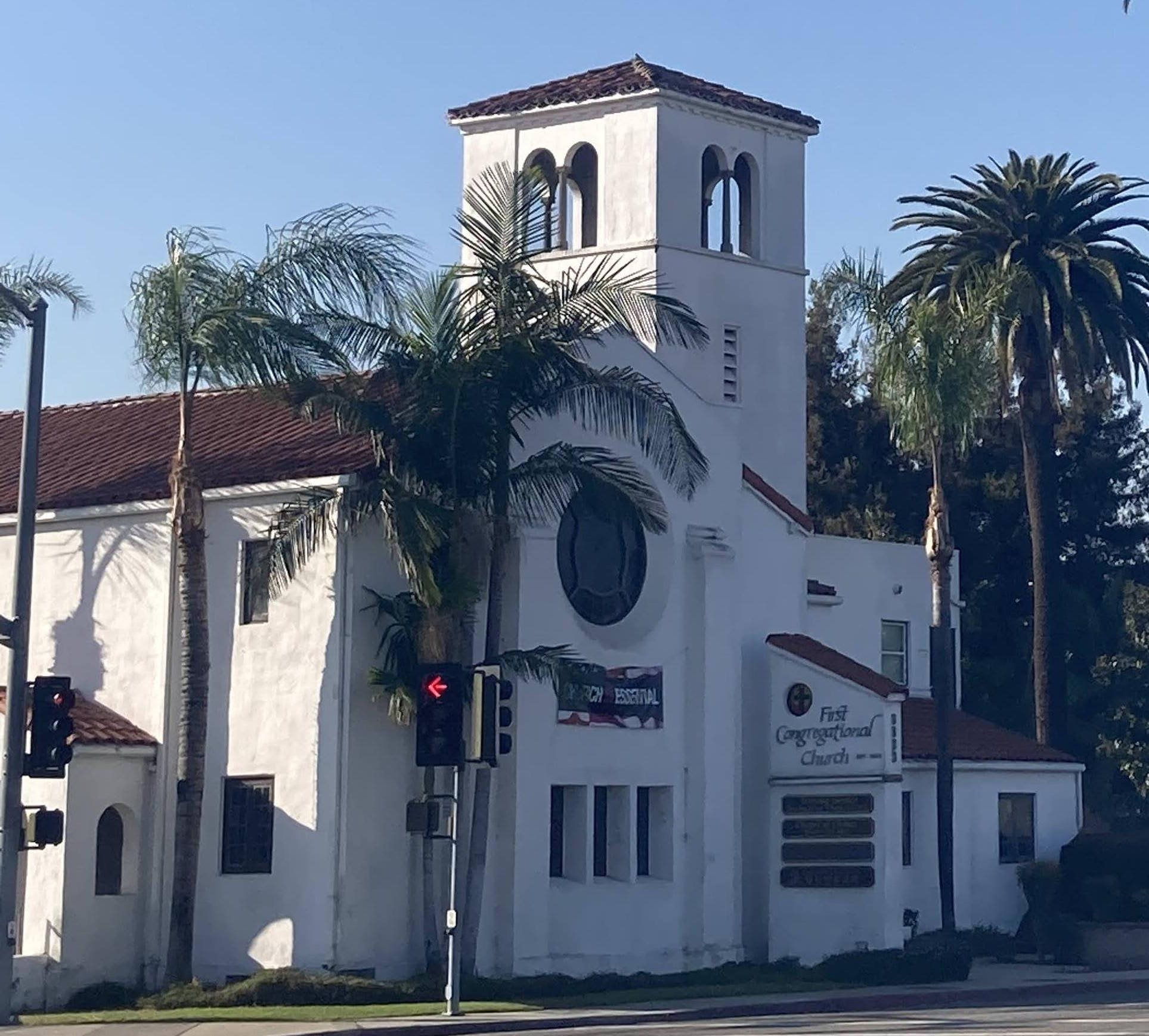
The Spanish Colonial Revival First Congregational Church was built in 1928.

As of the 2020 census, Buena Park had a population of 84,034. The population density was 7,981.2 inhabitants per square mile (3,081.6/km^{2}). The census reported that 100.0% of residents lived in urban areas and 0.0% lived in rural areas.

Racial composition as of the 2020 census
| Race | Number | Percent |
|---|---|---|
| White | 21,799 | 25.9% |
| Black or African American | 2,717 | 3.2% |
| American Indian and Alaska Native | 1,079 | 1.3% |
| Asian | 27,858 | 33.2% |
| Native Hawaiian and Other Pacific Islander | 434 | 0.5% |
| Some other race | 18,807 | 22.4% |
| Two or more races | 11,340 | 13.5% |
| Hispanic or Latino (of any race) | 34,330 | 40.9% |

The median age was 37.9 years; 21.5% of residents were under the age of 18, 9.7% were aged 18 to 24, 28.2% were aged 25 to 44, 26.5% were aged 45 to 64, and 14.1% were 65 years of age or older. For every 100 females there were 95.9 males, and for every 100 females age 18 and over there were 93.0 males age 18 and over.

Of the population, 99.2% lived in households, 0.5% lived in non-institutionalized group quarters, and 0.2% were institutionalized. There were 25,155 households, of which 38.2% had children under the age of 18 living in them, 55.4% were married-couple households, 5.5% were cohabiting couple households, 24.6% had a female householder with no partner present, and 14.5% had a male householder with no partner present. About 13.8% of households were made up of individuals, and 6.4% had someone living alone who was 65 years of age or older. The average household size was 3.31. There were 20,342 families (80.9% of all households).

There were 25,628 housing units, of which 1.8% were vacant; the homeowner vacancy rate was 0.3% and the rental vacancy rate was 1.7%. Of the 25,155 occupied units, 54.4% were owner-occupied, and 45.6% were occupied by renters.

=== 2023 American Community Survey estimates ===
In 2023, the US Census Bureau estimated that the median household income was $108,187, and the per capita income was $38,689. About 5.8% of families and 8.6% of the population were below the poverty line.

=== 2010 census ===
The 2010 United States census reported that Buena Park had a population of 80,530. The population density was 7,631.0 inhabitants per square mile (2,946.3/km^{2}). The racial makeup of Buena Park was 36,454 (45.3%) White (27.7% Non-Hispanic White), 3,073 (3.8%) African American, 862 (1.1%) Native American, 21,488 (26.7%) Asian, 455 (0.6%) Pacific Islander, 14,066 (17.5%) from other races, and 4,132 (5.1%) from two or more races. Hispanic or Latino of any race were 31,638 persons (39.3%).

The Census reported that 79,716 people (99.0% of the population) lived in households, 553 (0.7%) lived in non-institutionalized group quarters, and 261 (0.3%) were institutionalized.

There were 23,686 households, out of which 10,367 (43.8%) had children under the age of 18 living in them, 13,570 (57.3%) were opposite-sex married couples living together, 3,789 (16.0%) had a female householder with no husband present, 1,746 (7.4%) had a male householder with no wife present. There were 1,167 (4.9%) unmarried opposite-sex partnerships, and 166 (0.7%) same-sex married couples or partnerships. 3,398 households (14.3%) were made up of individuals, and 1,386 (5.9%) had someone living alone who was 65 years of age or older. The average household size was 3.37. There were 19,105 families (80.7% of all households); the average family size was 3.67.

The population was spread out, with 20,361 people (25.3%) under the age of 18, 8,610 people (10.7%) aged 18 to 24, 22,688 people (28.2%) aged 25 to 44, 20,320 people (25.2%) aged 45 to 64, and 8,551 people (10.6%) who were 65 years of age or older. The median age was 35.1 years. For every 100 females, there were 97.4 males. For every 100 females age 18 and over, there were 94.5 males.

There were 24,623 housing units at an average density of 2,333.3 units per square mile (900.9 units/km^{2}), of which 13,428 (56.7%) were owner-occupied, and 10,258 (43.3%) were occupied by renters. The homeowner vacancy rate was 1.1%; the rental vacancy rate was 5.0%. 45,084 people (56.0% of the population) lived in owner-occupied housing units and 34,632 people (43.0%) lived in rental housing units.

According to the 2010 United States census, Buena Park had a median household income of $64,205, with 11.1% of the population living below the federal poverty line.

== Economy ==
=== Top employers ===
According to the city's 2021 Comprehensive Annual Financial Report, the top employers in the city are:

| # | Employer | # of employees |
|---|---|---|
| 1 | Knott's Berry Farm | 5,071 |
| 2 | Leach | 483 |
| 3 | PepsiCo | 477 |
| 4 | Access Business Group | 372 |
| 5 | Yamaha | 350 |
| 6 | RIA Financial/AFEX Money Express | 348 |
| 7 | City of Buena Park | 281 |
| 8 | Walmart | 269 |
| 9 | Exemplis Manufacturing | 250 |
| 10 | House of Imports | 249 |

Supermarket chain 99 Ranch Market is based in Buena Park. A Nabisco factory built in 1965 once employed as many as 500 before being shut down; it was demolished in 2006.

The Source OC is a Korean shopping center that contains 3 floors, a theater, a golf zone, and a karaoke lounge. The food court is named Grub. It features two Korean Grocery stores, bakeries, restaurants, Karaoke spots, and a boba shop. It has faced economic challenges since its opening and was also affected by the COVID-19 pandemic.

== Government ==
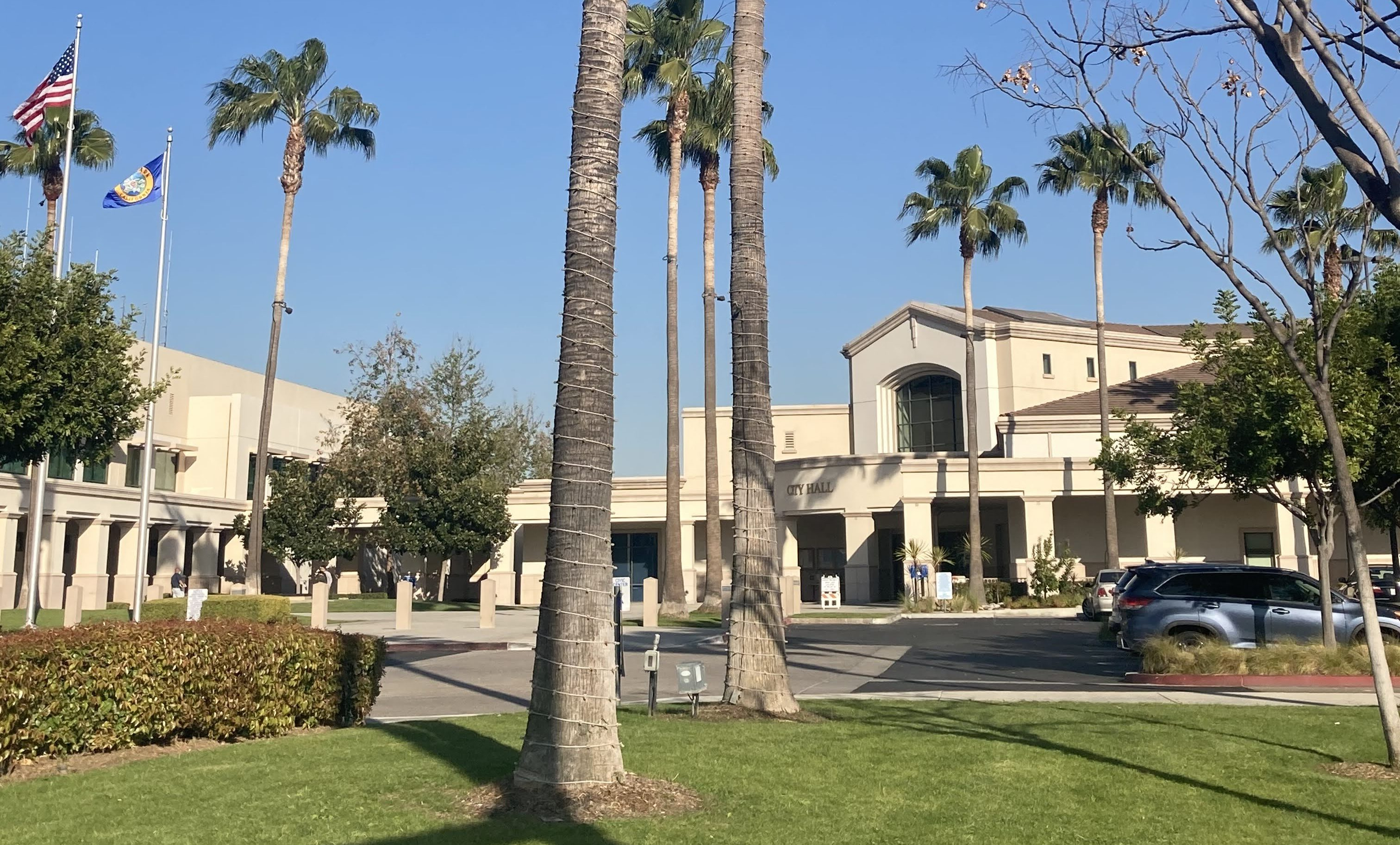
Buena Park City Hall

=== Local government ===
Buena Park was incorporated as a General Law City on January 27, 1953. In November 2008, the voters adopted a City Charter. The City Charter is a written document approved by the electorate which acts as a “constitution” for the city. Amendments, revisions and repeals of a charter are subject to the vote of the people.

Buena Park operates under council–manager government, in which the City Council is the policy-making body and the City Manager is responsible for carrying out Council policy and everyday management of city functions. An elected City Council of five non-partisan members is elected at large and its chair acts as mayor.

As of December 2025, city council members are Mayor Connor Traut, Vice Mayor Lamiya Hoque, Council Member Carlos Franco, Council Member Susan Sonne, and Council Member Joyce Ahn.

=== State and federal representation ===
In the California State Senate, Buena Park is split between the 34th senatorial district, represented by Democrat Tom Umberg, and the 36th senatorial district, represented by Republican Tony Strickland. In the California State Assembly, it is in the 67th Assembly district, represented by Democrat Sharon Quirk-Silva.

In the United States House of Representatives, Buena Park is in California's 45th congressional district, which is represented by Democrat Derek Tran.

=== Politics ===
According to the California Secretary of State, as of October 24, 2022, Buena Park has 43,879 registered voters. Of those, 18,709 (42.6%) are registered Democrats, 11,999 (27.3%) are registered Republicans, and 13,171 (30.0%) have declined to state a political party/are independents.

Buena Park city vote by party in presidential elections
| Year | Democratic | Republican | Third Parties |
|---|---|---|---|
| 2024 | 51.0% 15,603 | 46.0% 14,076 | 3% 917 |
| 2020 | 56.5% 19,527 | 41.5% 14,337 | 2.0% 688 |
| 2016 | 56.4% 14,872 | 36.7% 9,679 | 6.9% 1,804 |
| 2012 | 54.1% 13,022 | 43.4% 10,459 | 2.5% 603 |
| 2008 | 53.1% 13,196 | 44.7% 11,130 | 2.2% 550 |
| 2004 | 44.1% 9,928 | 54.8% 12,343 | 1.1% 242 |
| 2000 | 47.1% 9,862 | 49.3% 10,332 | 3.7% 767 |
| 1996 | 44.1% 8,235 | 44.0% 8,212 | 12.0% 2,234 |
| 1992 | 35.2% 7,928 | 39.7% 8,935 | 25.1% 5,654 |
| 1988 | 35.2% 7,934 | 63.7% 14,353 | 1.1% 244 |
| 1984 | 26.9% 6,036 | 72.1% 16,203 | 1.1% 237 |
| 1980 | 28.0% 6,170 | 63.3% 13,940 | 8.6% 1,897 |
| 1976 | 44.5% 8,944 | 53.4% 10,730 | 2.1% 415 |

=== Postal service ===
The United States Postal Service Buena Park Post Office is at 7377 La Palma Avenue.

== Education ==
=== K-12 education ===
The city is served by seven different school districts. Buena Park School District covers nearly the entire northern half of the city, which feeds into the Fullerton Joint Union High School District, while the districts of Centralia, Cypress, Magnolia, and Savanna serve the remainder of the city, feeding into the Anaheim Union High School District.

Buena Park High School (of the Fullerton UHSD) is the only comprehensive high school within city limits. The attendance boundary of Sunny Hills High School in Fullerton, of Fullerton UHSD, also includes part of Buena Park. Within Anaheim UHSD, Kennedy, Savanna, and Western high schools also all serve the city's students, but are in either La Palma or Anaheim.

Gordon H. Beatty (now known as Gordon H. Beatty Middle School), Arthur F. Corey, Charles G. Emery (a 2011 Blue Ribbon Award winner), Carl E. Gilbert, Mabel L. Pendleton and James A. Whitaker Elementary Schools along with Buena Park Junior High (now known as Buena Park Middle School) are the seven schools that make up the Buena Park School District.

=== Public libraries ===
Buena Park is home to one of the 13 special district libraries in California. The Buena Park Library District is a single-purpose library district governed by an elected Board of Trustees, and has as its principal source of income through property tax proration. The library's early history is much like other communities: it operated on and off as a volunteer operation beginning in 1905 at several temporary locations with donated books. It was formally established as a library district through the efforts of the Buena Park Woman's Club in 1919. The current facility's construction was completed in early 1969 financed by a bond measure passed by the citizens of Buena Park on June 6, 1967. The community's library holds over 125,000 library materials.

== Infrastructure ==
=== Media ===
Los Cerritos Community News serves the city.

=== Emergency services ===
Fire protection in Buena Park is provided by the Orange County Fire Authority . Law enforcement is provided by the Buena Park Police Department. Ambulance service is provided by emergency Ambulance Service.

=== Transportation ===
Buena Park's main commercial artery is Beach Boulevard, (California State Route 39), running north–south and connecting the city's civic center, the E-Zone entertainment district, and Buena Park Downtown shopping center.

Three Caltrans state maintained highways run through the city. They include Interstate 5 (Santa Ana Freeway), California State Route 39 (Beach Boulevard) and California State Route 91 (Artesia Freeway). The freeways connect Buena Park with cities west–east and south–north respectively. The Orange County Transportation Authority provides public bus services, but most residents rely on cars. Also, one Los Angeles County Route runs through the city Los Angeles County Route N8 (La Mirada Boulevard), but only for a quarter of a mile. Other main arterials that run west–east include Ball Road, Lincoln Avenue (formerly California State Route 214), La Palma Avenue, Orangethorpe Avenue, Commonwealth Avenue, Artesia Boulevard, Malvern Avenue and Alondra Boulevard; south–north main arterials include Valley View Street, Knott Avenue, Western Avenue, Beach Boulevard (SR 39) and Stanton Avenue. Four other major arterials that have short sections along the city limits of Buena Park include Cerritos Avenue to the south, Walker Street to the west, Rosecrans Avenue to the north and Magnolia Avenue to the east.

Fullerton Municipal Airport is the closest airport, but the nearest airport with commercial service is Long Beach Airport, about 13 miles (21 km) to the southwest. Both Union Pacific (originally Southern Pacific) and BNSF railroad tracks cross the city.

A Metrolink station in Buena Park opened in September 2007. The LA Metro route 460 bus connects to downtown Los Angeles and Crypto.com Arena.

== See also ==
- Jesse Yarnell, newspaperman and ranch owner
