= Juyubit =

Former Native American settlement in California

- Former settlement
- Location in California
- Coordinates: 33°52′05″N 118°02′00″W
- Country: United States
- State: California
- County: Los Angeles County

Juyubit (also, Jujubit) was one of the largest villages of the Tongva people. The village was located at the foot of the West Coyote Hills at the confluence of the Coyote and La Cañada Verde creeks, in present-day Buena Park and Cerritos. It was one of the largest villages in Tovaangar. Alternate names of the village include: Jujubit, Jutucubit, Jutucuvit, Jutubit, Jutucunga, Utucubit, Otocubit, Uchubit, Ychubit, and Uchunga.

== Colonization ==
Records from the San Fernando and San Gabriel missions record 347 baptisms from Juyubit between 1774 and 1804. However, because of incorrect and/or inaccurate village naming records, more Juyubit villagers may have been baptized at these missions. Villagers from involved in the 1785 revolt on Mission San Gabriel led by Toypurina, a medicine woman from the village of Jaichivit.

One woman from Juyubit, Eulalia María, was baptized at the age of six and became a godmother as an adult. She died in 1818.

By 1840, much of Juyubit's population was absorbed into Missions San Juan Capistrano and San Gabriel.

== Legacy ==
Versions of Juyubit are mentioned in the narrative legend of the late 18th—early 19th century Tongvan heroine Toypurina.

== See also ==
- Toypurina
- Gabrielino traditional narratives
- Zorro, novel by Isabel Allende with Toypurnia
  - Tongva language
