= The Source OC =

Shopping mall in Buena Park, California

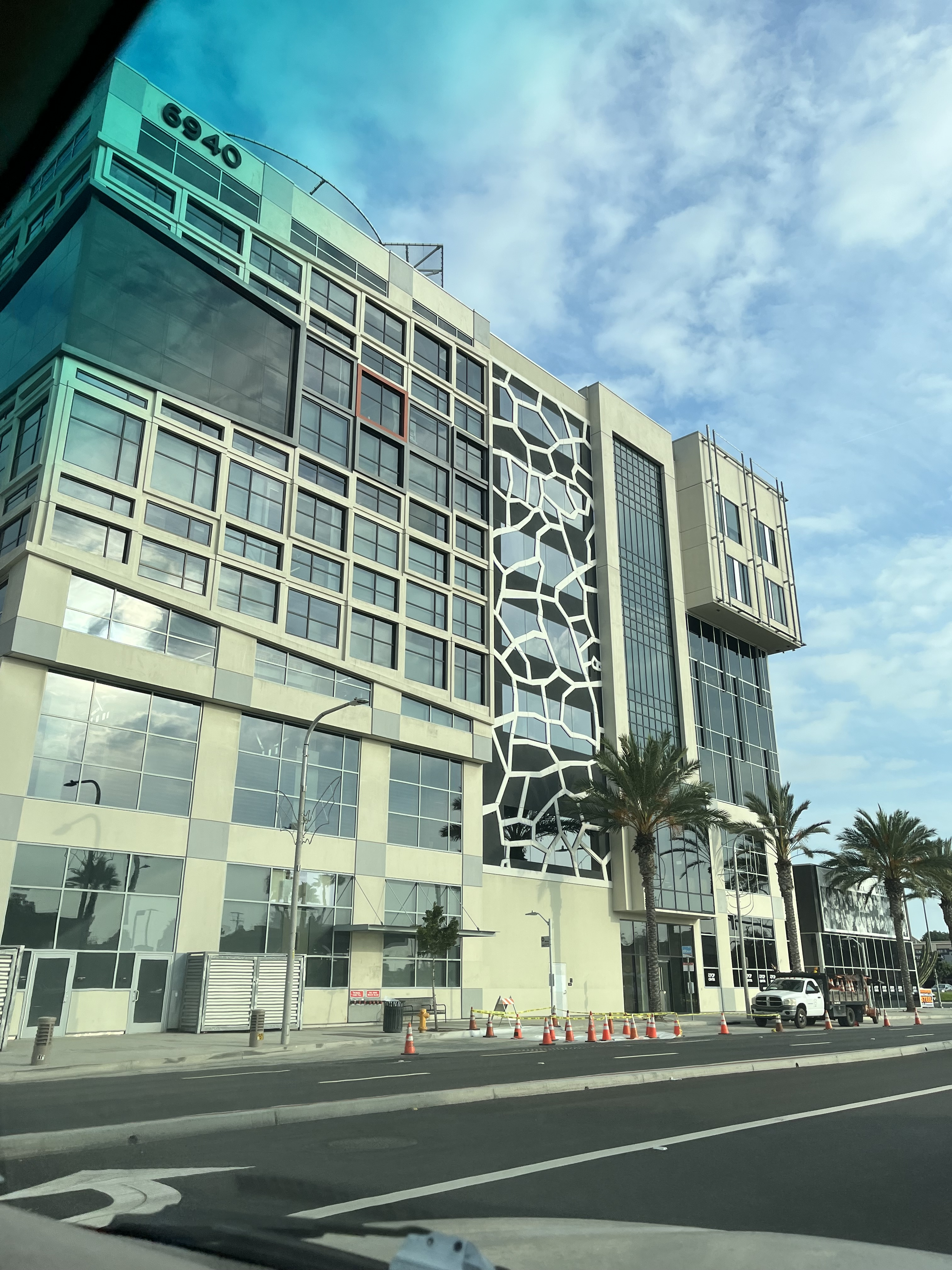
- The west face seen from California State Route 39 in 2024
- Location: Buena Park, California, United States of America
- Coordinates: 33.8597°N 117.9978°W
- Address: 6940 Beach Blvd, Buena Park, CA 90621
- Opened: 2016
- Developer: M+D Properties
- Manager: M+D Properties
- Architect: NBBJ
- Num. of stores: 62 (2021)
- Num. of anchor tenants: 0
- Floor area: 12.5 acres (5.1 ha)
- Floors: 7
- Website: www.thesourceoc.com

The Source OC is a mixed-use development in Buena Park, California, primarily being used as an open-air shopping mall. Parts of the site are also being used as office space. The site opened in 2016 and is home to many Korean-owned businesses.

== History ==
The Source began construction in August 2012 and was developed by M+D Properties. The center was previously approved by the city, which promised to pay the developer 55% of sales tax revenue made by the project for the next 30 years, in 2010. Buena Park was chosen for its lack of large retailing centers in the area, as the nearest mall at the time, the Los Cerritos Center, was 5 mi (8.0 km) away. The mall was also seen as a comeback for the city in the entertainment sector after the closing of Movieland Wax Museum. It was built on an empty field and cost about $325 million overall. In April 2014, Korean entertainment agency YG Entertainment proposed a performance venue, recording studio, and nightclub at The Source called YG Land. This plan did not come to fruition. The construction of the mall upset many residents who lived nearby.

The Source opened in late 2016. Despite its high budget, this shopping mall was not able to acquire an anchor tenant. By 2018, many stores that previously anchored had lost popularity and M+D Properties gained $140 million in loans. The hotel filed for Chapter 11 bankruptcy in 2021. M+D Properties also announced that the mall is for sale in that same year. In 2023, some of the area surrounding The Source was designated as the Koreatown neighborhood of Buena Park.

== Features ==
Notable tenants at The Source include Gong Cha, Mochinut, Popeyes, Myungrang Hot Dog, CGV Cinemas, Covered California, Coway, Woori Bank, and Aritaum. It contains 200,000 sq ft (19,000 m^{2}) of office space and a four-star hotel. The food court is named Grub. It features cafes, bubble tea cafes, bakeries, clothing stores, restaurants, a karaoke place, and two food courts. It has faced economic challenges since its opening and was also affected by the COVID-19 pandemic.

The buildings onsite were limited to 200 ft (61 m) in height to not obstruct the surrounding residential areas and planes flying to Fullerton Municipal Airport. The Source was given its name for the manmade spring that was located at the center of the site. It contains the first building in the city to have a helipad, as the seven-floor office tower reaches 107 ft (33 m), exceeding the 75 ft (23 m) requirement for helipads.

The Source is frequented by Korean Americans; street karaoke is common and K-pop groups like Blackswan can be found occasionally performing. Local dance crews also practice their K-pop routines in public in the mall. It formerly hosted the now-defunct Korean idol academy K-Pop Center (also known as KPC). Stage X Studio, another academy offering similar services, later took over the space.

== Gallery ==
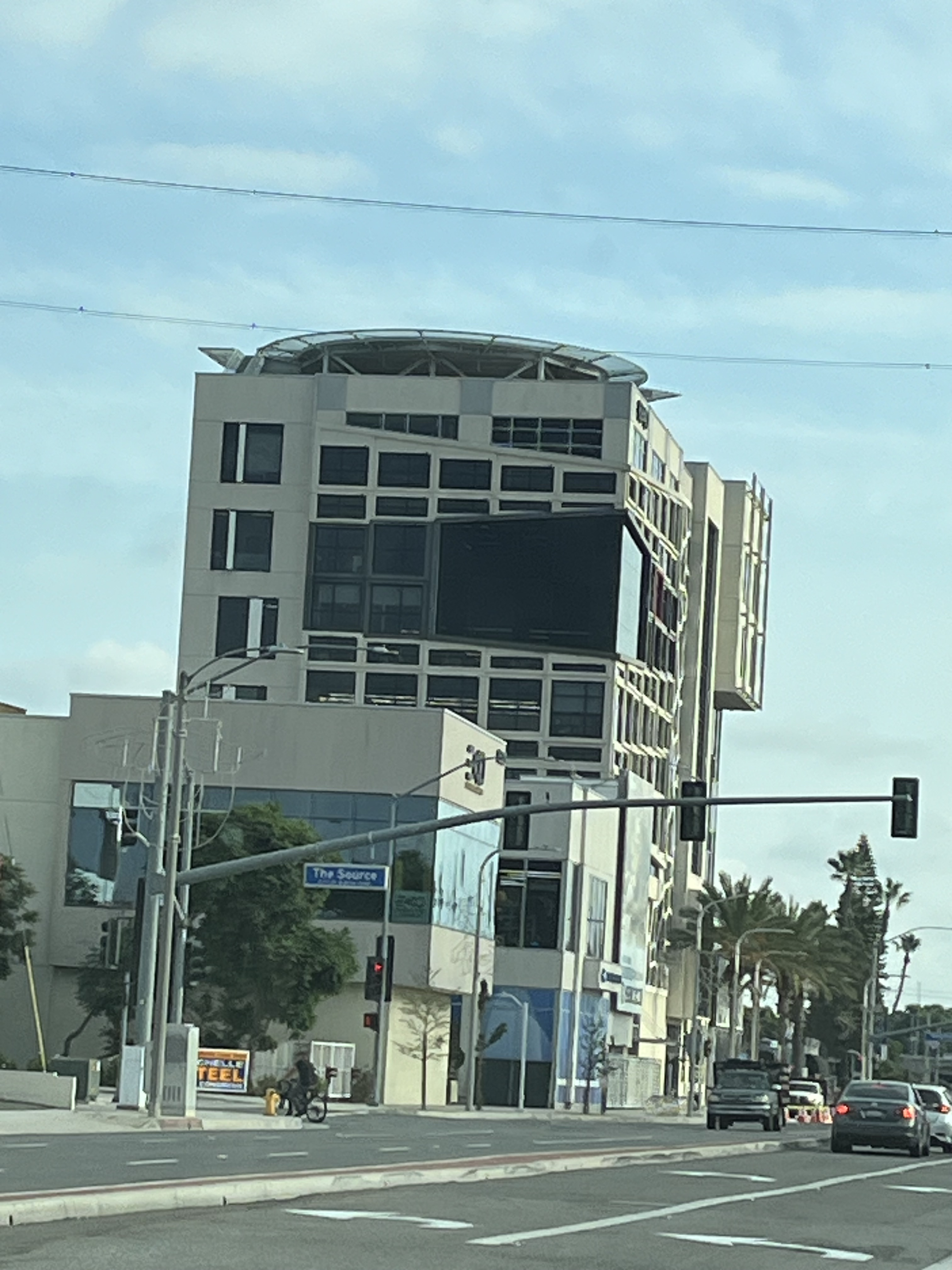
From the road
