= Chung Chun Rice Dog =

International restaurant chain

- Number of locations: 300

Chung Chun Rice Dog, also known as Chung Chun Rice Hot Dog and Chungchun Ssal, is a South Korean restaurant chain with more than 300 locations internationally.

The global brand Chung Chun was established in Seoul in 2017, and has also been described as Canada's "first-ever Korean Hot Dog restaurant brand".

Mochinut, established in 2020, has been described as a spinoff of Chung Chun. The first Mochinut location opened within a Chung Chun in Southern California.

== Description ==
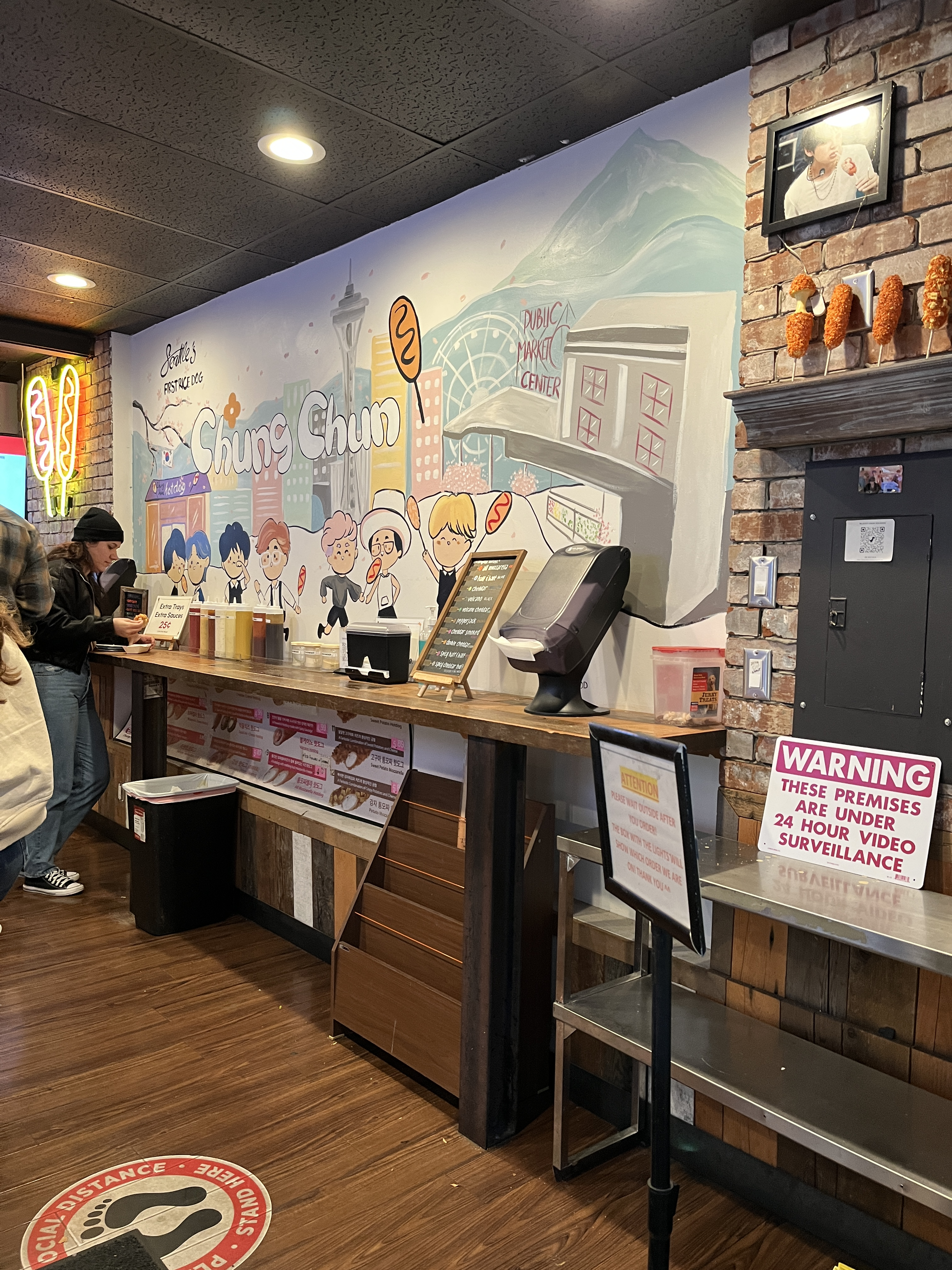
The Seattle location's interior, 2022

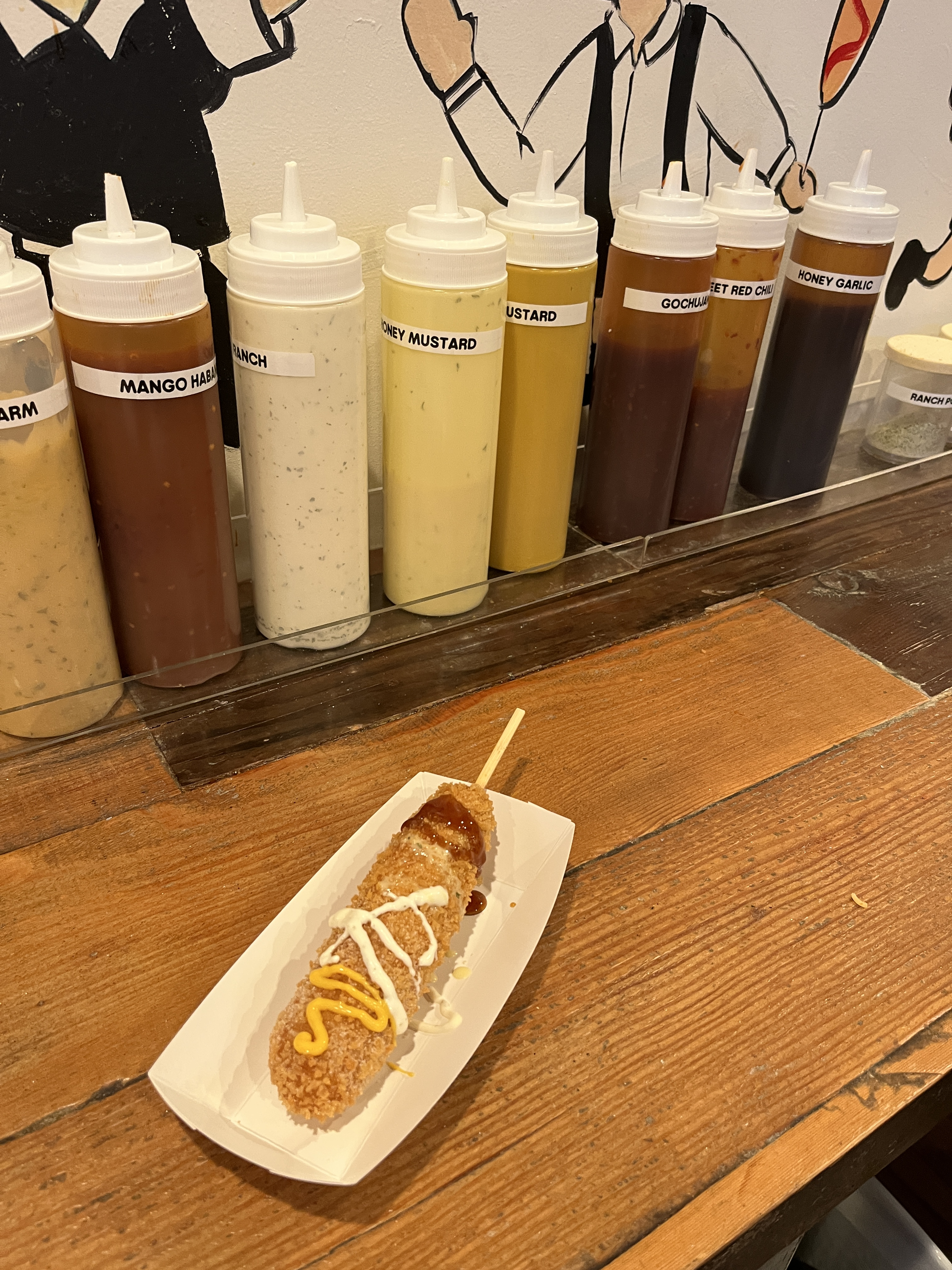
Rice dog and various sauces, Seattle, 2022

The business serves hot dogs with various batters, dips, sauces and toppings such as panko breadcrumbs, Korean ramen noodles, granulated sugar, potato, and squid ink. Its signature dish is a Korean-inspired take on a corn dog, the rice dog. The dog-on-a-stick is dipped into rice flour batter and rolled in breadcrumbs before frying, which creates a crispier crust than the traditional cornmeal-battered hot dog.

== History ==
There were 200 locations internationally, as of October 2019, in South Korea, Australia, China, Japan, and elsewhere.

=== Canada ===
The first location in Canada opened in Toronto, Ontario, in 2019. There were 31 locations in Canada, as of mid 2022. In Alberta, Chung Chun has operated in Calgary and Edmonton. The Calgary location opened in 2022. The chain began operating in Edmonton's West Edmonton Mall in 2022. In British Columbia, there are multiple locations in the Lower Mainland: in Vancouver, Burnaby, New Westminster, and Richmond. The Vancouver location opened in the West End in November 2020. The Richmond location followed in 2021. The business began operating in Winnipeg, Manitoba, in 2023.

In Ontario, the chain has operated in Toronto, Guelph, Hamilton, and Orillia. Following Toronto, the Guelph location opened in the Harvard Plaza in mid 2022. The Hamilton location opened in Westdale in June 2021. There are nine locations in Quebec, as of mid 2022. A location opened near Concordia University's downtown campus in Montreal in 2020. A larger location opened in Laval in 2021. Another location opened in Côte-des-Neiges, Montreal, in 2022. The business has also operated in the city's Chinatown neighborhood.

=== United States ===
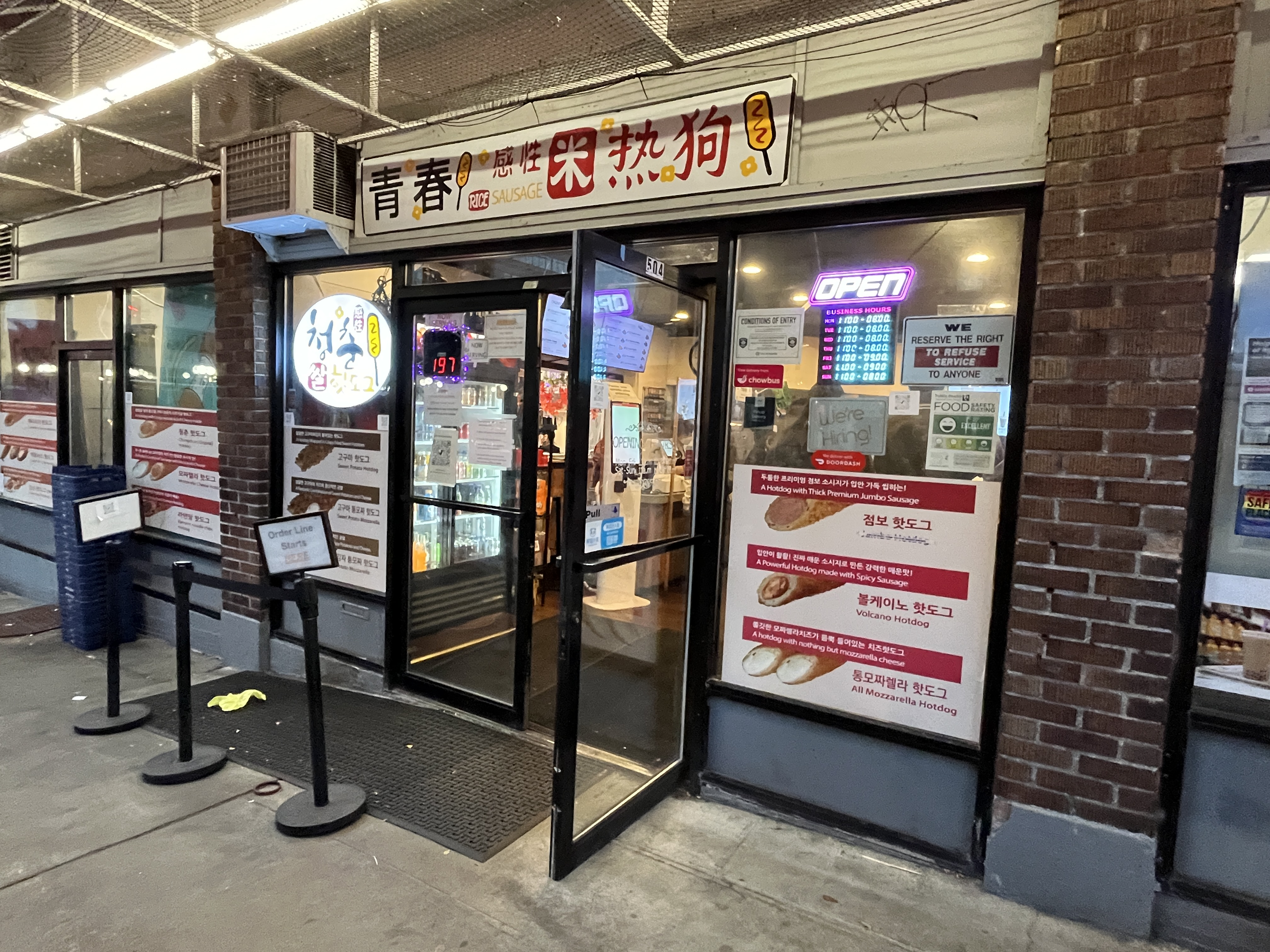
Exterior of the restaurant in Seattle's Chinatown–International District, 2022

In California, the business has operated in Los Angeles and San Diego. The San Diego location opened in 2019. In New Jersey, the chain planned to open a location in Norwood, as of 2020. In Texas, the Korean shaved ice shop Sul Bing Su in Katy began selling Chung Chun in 2019. In Washington, Chung Chun's first location in the Pacific Northwest began operating in Seattle's Chinatown–International District in late 2019. One hundred customers received a free rice dog at the shop's grand opening.

== Reception ==
Dylan Joffe, Maggy Lehmicke, Gabe Guarente, and Jade Yamazaki Stewart included the business in Eater Seattle's 2022 overview of Seattle's best inexpensive meals.

== See also ==
- List of restaurants in Vancouver
