= East Coyote Hills =

Californian mountain range

- Location within California Location within the United States

Highest point
- Elevation: 151 m (495 ft)

Geography
- Country: United States
- State: California
- District: Orange County
- Range coordinates: 33°53′32.051″N 117°54′7.216″W
- Topo map: USGS La Habra

The East Coyote Hills are a low mountain range in northern Orange County, California, mostly in the cities of Fullerton and Placentia.

The hills received their name from the nearby Rancho Los Coyotes; by the 1870s they were being called Coyote Hills. Most of the East Coyote Hills were developed as residential areas in the 1980s and 1990s. Several equestrian and pedestrian trails have been built through the area, as well as a golf course and Craig Regional Park.

== See also ==
- Coyote Hills - disambiguation
- West Coyote Hills, also in Orange County
