= West Coyote Hills =

Hills in Orange County, California

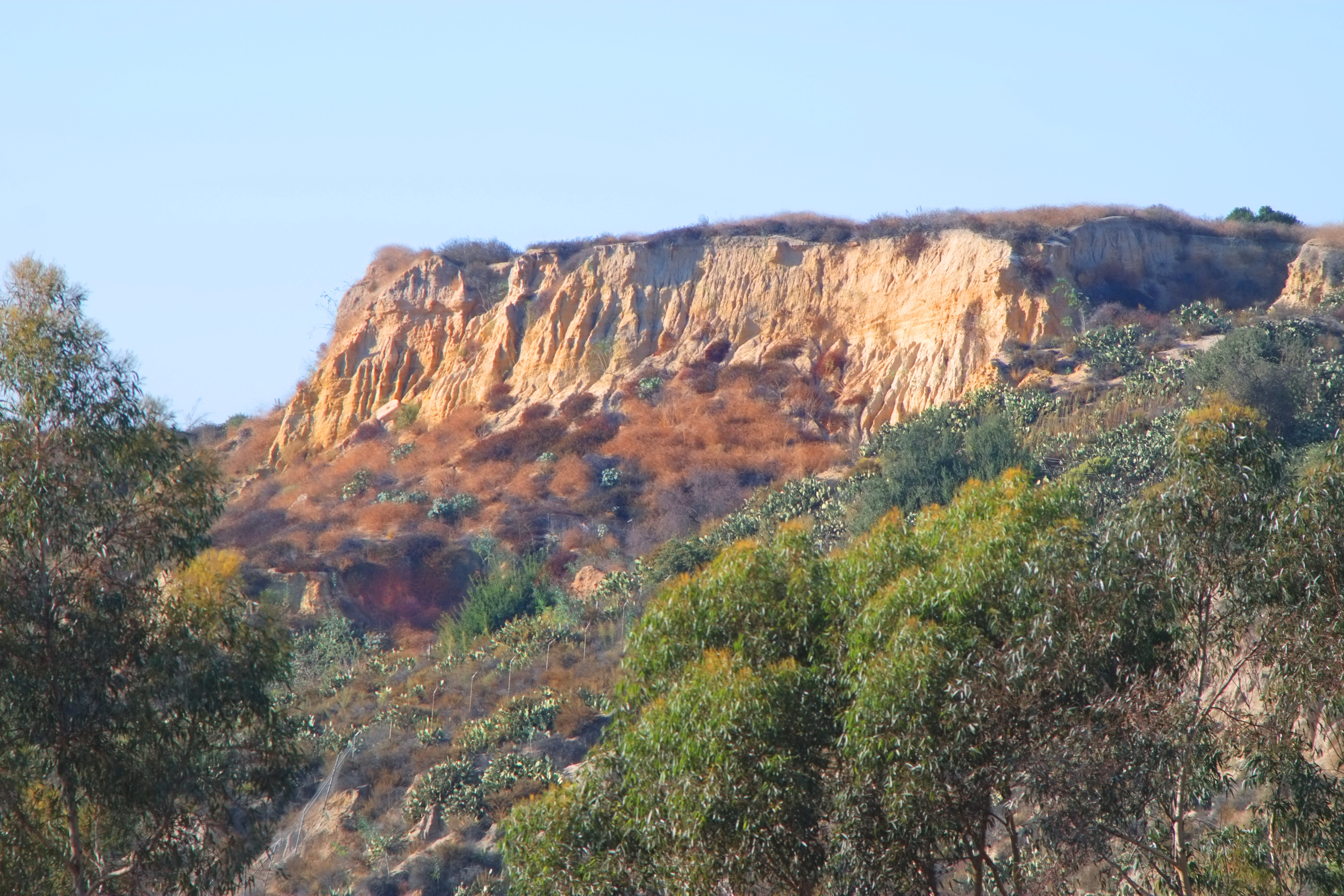
- cliffs in Coyote Hills

Highest point
- Elevation: 184 m (604 ft)

Geography
- Location within California Location within the United States
- Country: United States
- State: California
- District: Orange County
- Range coordinates: 33°54′19.050″N 117°57′44.224″W
- Topo map: USGS La Habra

The West Coyote Hills is the area surrounding a ridge in northern Orange County, California. It contains one of the last large open-space area in north Orange County. Parts of it lie within the city limits of La Habra, Buena Park, and La Mirada, with most of it sprawling across western Fullerton between Ralph B. Clark Regional Park and Euclid Street north of Rosecrans Avenue. The foothill region to the east and south is known as Sunny Hills. There is also an East Coyote Hills area, on the east side of Fullerton, that has been almost completely developed for residential real estate.

The remaining open-space area is currently the subject of a long-running dispute over residential development, pitting conservationists against a pro-development majority on the city council. A division of Chevron is currently proposing to develop the portions of the land that are suitable for development, while leaving the remainder as open space.

== Name ==
The hills received their name from the nearby Rancho Los Coyotes; by the 1870s they were being called Coyote Hills. The name is appropriate, since coyotes do inhabit the area.

== Development ==
The West Coyote Hills was once a major oil field, dating back to 1890. Extraction has long since ceased, and most of the West Coyote Hills has been developed for residential and commercial use, as well as West Coyote Hills Park.

A tract measuring 510 acres (2.1 km^{2}) across the ridge of the hills, owned by Pacific Coast Homes (a land development division of the Chevron Corporation), is the largest remaining tract of undeveloped land in north Orange County. Pacific Coast Homes plans to build 760 homes on 179 acres (0.72 km^{2}), while restoring and donating 352 acres to the City of Fullerton for use as the Robert E. Ward Nature Preserve. A group called Open Coyote Hills has been leading the support while a group called Friends of Coyote Hills has led the push to preserve the entire site as open space.

In 2012, Fullerton voters voted to prevent development in a referendum, Measure W. Lawsuits have resulted over the interpretation of the measure. The city council has a pro-development majority, which has sided with Chevron, and won in Superior Court, but the decision has been appealed. In 2017, State Senator Josh Newman authored Senate Bill 714, which would create a West Coyote Hills Conservancy with initial funding. In 2021, the City of Fullerton purchased the eastern portion of the land adjacent to the Robert E. Ward Nature Preserve using primarily state funds. Efforts continue to buy the remaining land from Chevron, using state funds, donations, or both.

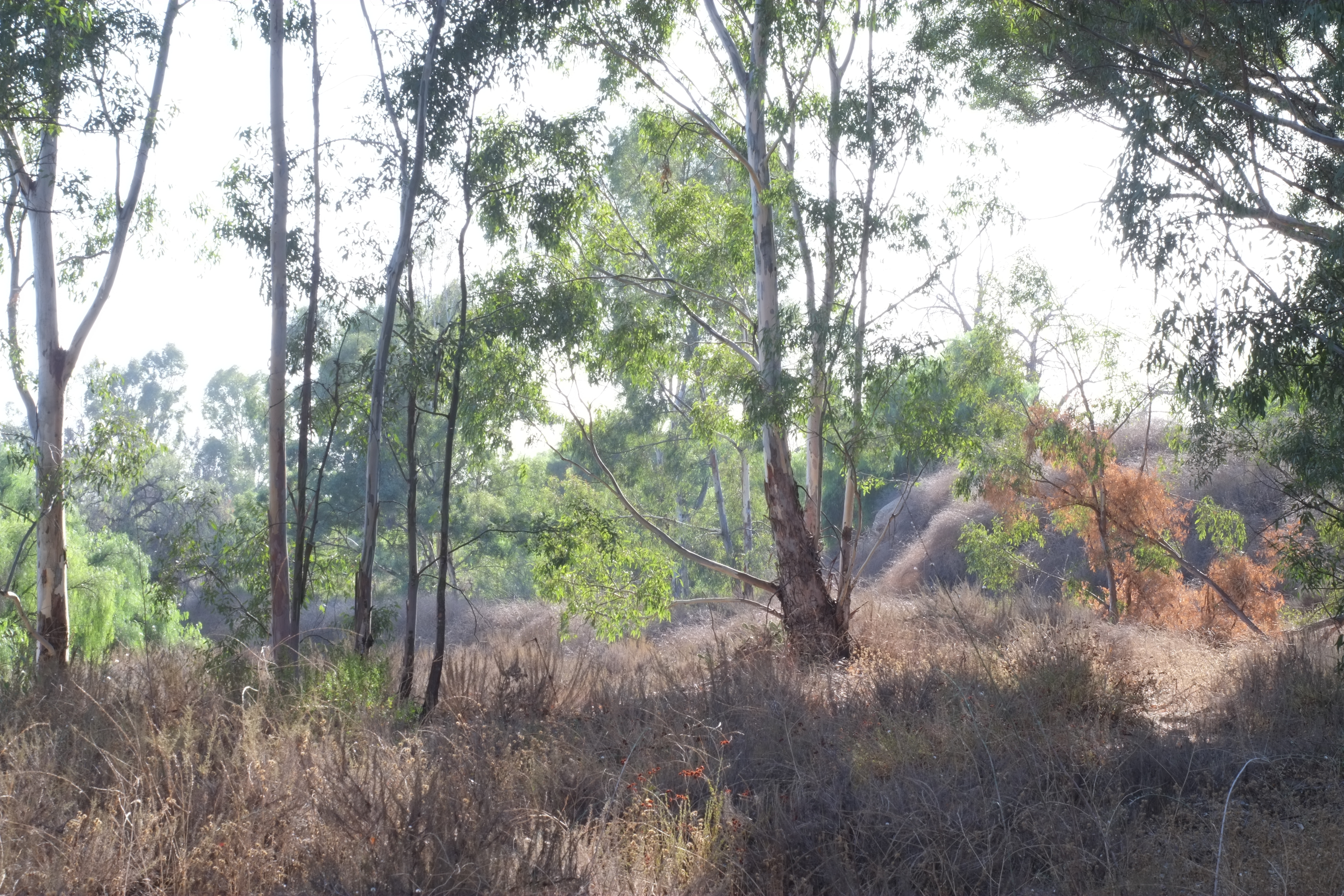
Eucalyptus trees and buckwheat in a meadow in Coyote Hills.

== Plant life ==
The undeveloped areas of Coyote Hills are vegetated with coastal sage scrub. Native species include buckwheat and prickly pear. Nonnative plants include pepper trees, tobacco trees, and mustard. There are no creeks, except for ephemeral freshets after storms, and no native riparian species such as oaks. Mature eucalyptus trees and some pine trees grow along some of the fence lines, where the area abuts housing tracts and the city's trail system.

== Topography ==
The area has been modified by large earth-moving projects to reduce the number of steep hills and canyons, allowing Gilbert Street to be constructed and real estate developments and later a golf course to be built on the west side of Gilbert. East of Gilbert Street, the undeveloped area consists mainly of a large, sun-exposed, gentle north-facing slope. The larger area west of Gilbert contains rugged terrain, predominantly south-facing slopes, and a large, long, dry, flat-bottomed canyon that runs north-south. The canyon bottom has been paved, and provides a fire road accessible from the nearby fire station on Rosecrans Avenue. The steep sides of the canyon were terraced and networked with asphalt roads for oil drilling. Impressive cliffs are a landmark visible to motorists on Rosecrans Avenue.

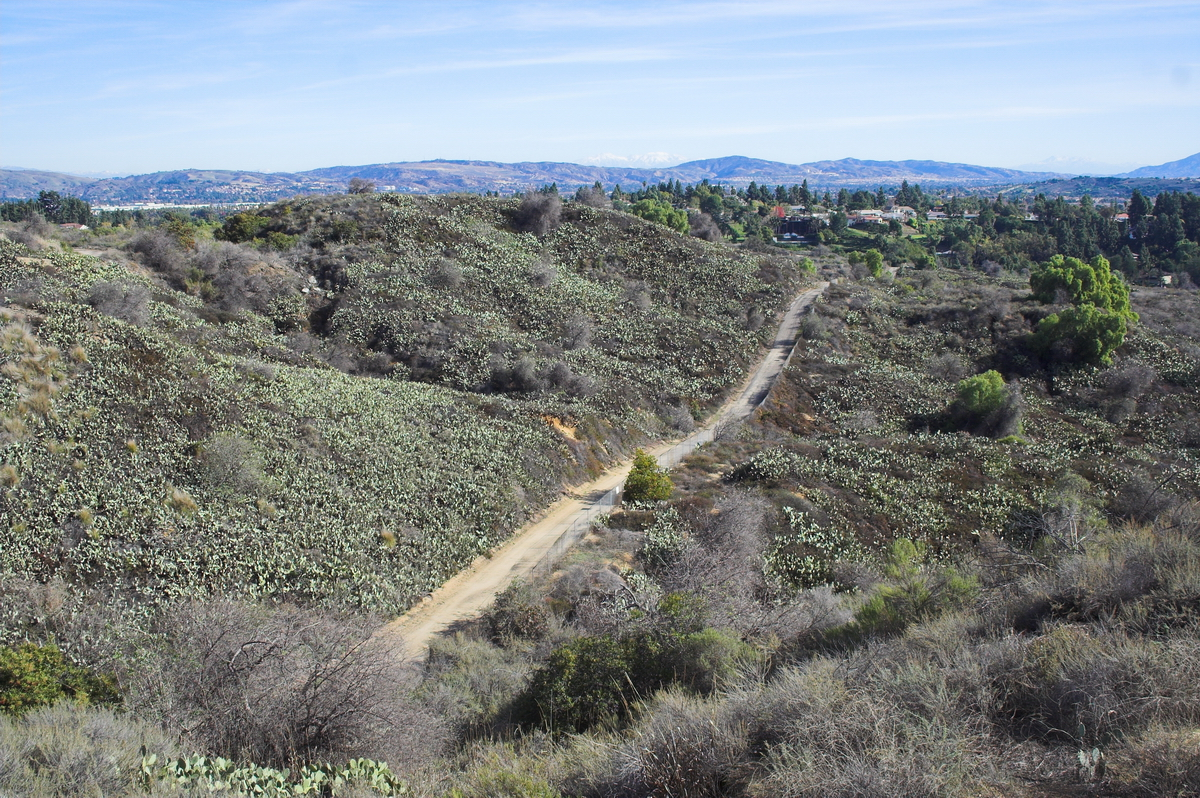
Prickly pear on an east-facing slope near Euclid Street, viewed from the Fullerton Loop.

== Fossils ==
U.S. Geological Survey researchers have found invertebrate fossils representing 184 taxa from 158 localities in the "San Pedro" Formation in the Coyote Hills, including various species of annelids, mollusks, arthropods, and echinoids; the fossils suggest a late Pliocene to early Pleistocene age for outcrops of the formation. The occurrence of the bivalve Solamen columbianum in the area marks its first occurrence as a fossil. The oldest fossil occurrence of the gastropods Tegula pulligo (Gmelin), questionably Haliotis cracherodii, and the crustacean Randallia ornata occur in the "San Pedro" Formation in the Coyote Hills.

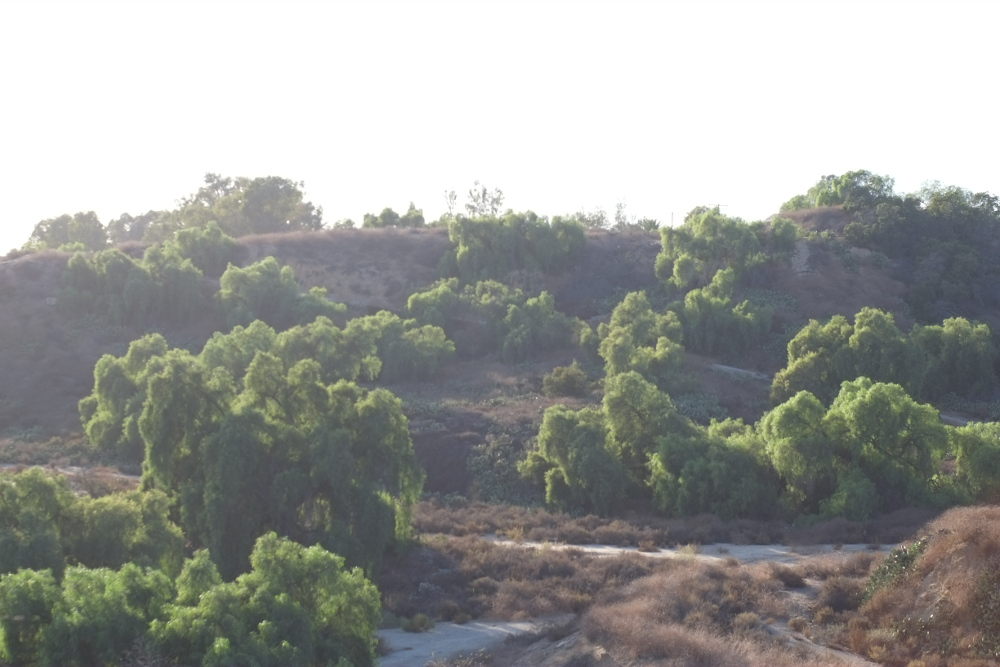
Hillside heavily forested with pepper trees.

== Risner fire ==
A brush fire, the Risner fire, originated at a transient encampment in the area. It burned about 80 acres on September 8 and 9, 2015, prompting the evacuation of about 40 nearby homes.

== See also ==
- East Coyote Hills
- Juyubit, California
