= Coyote Hills (Plumas County) =

Hill range in Plumas County, California, US

- Location within California

Highest point
- Elevation: 1,784 m (5,853 ft)

Geography
- Country: United States
- State: California
- District: Plumas County
- Range coordinates: 39°58′43.641″N 120°26′4.774″W
- Topo map: USGS Crocker Mountain

The Coyote Hills are a low mountain-hills range in Plumas County, California.
