= Mochinut =

American donut chain

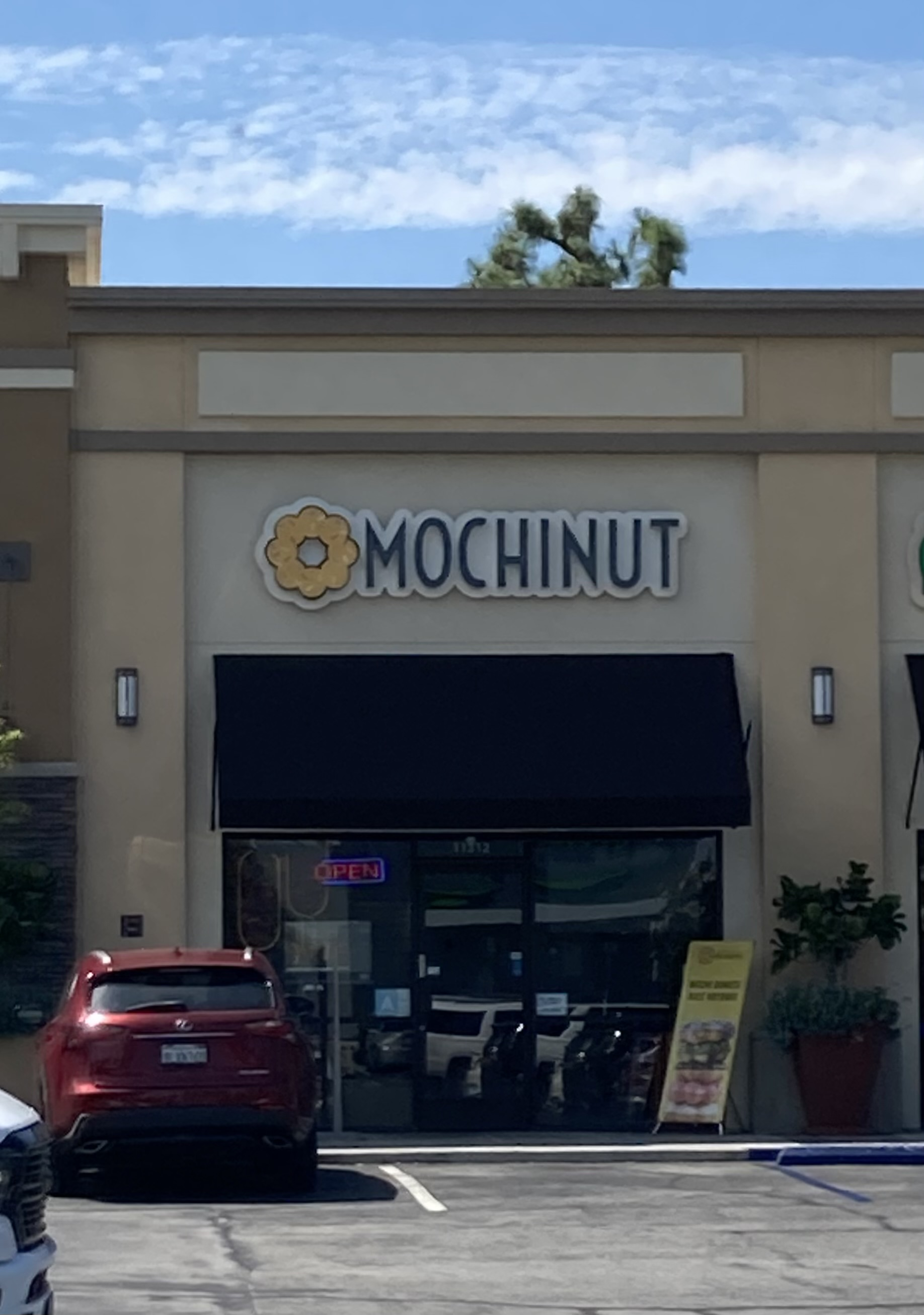
- A location in Cerritos, California, in 2023
- Type: Privately held company
- Industry: Food and beverage
- Founded: March 13, 2020; 6 years ago in Cerritos, California
- Founder: Jaewook Ha
- Headquarters: Los Angeles, California, United States
- Number of locations: 148 (2023)
- Area served: South Korea; United States
- Key people: Jaewook Ha (founder and CEO)
- Website: www.mochinut.com

Mochinut is an American restaurant chain specializing in mochi donuts, boba, and Korean-style hot dogs. The company has locations across the United States, South Korea, and Thailand.

== History ==
The chain was founded in Cerritos, California, on March 13, 2020, by Jaewook Ha. It has been described as a spin-off of Chung Chun Rice Dog, having its first location inside of it.

== Menu ==
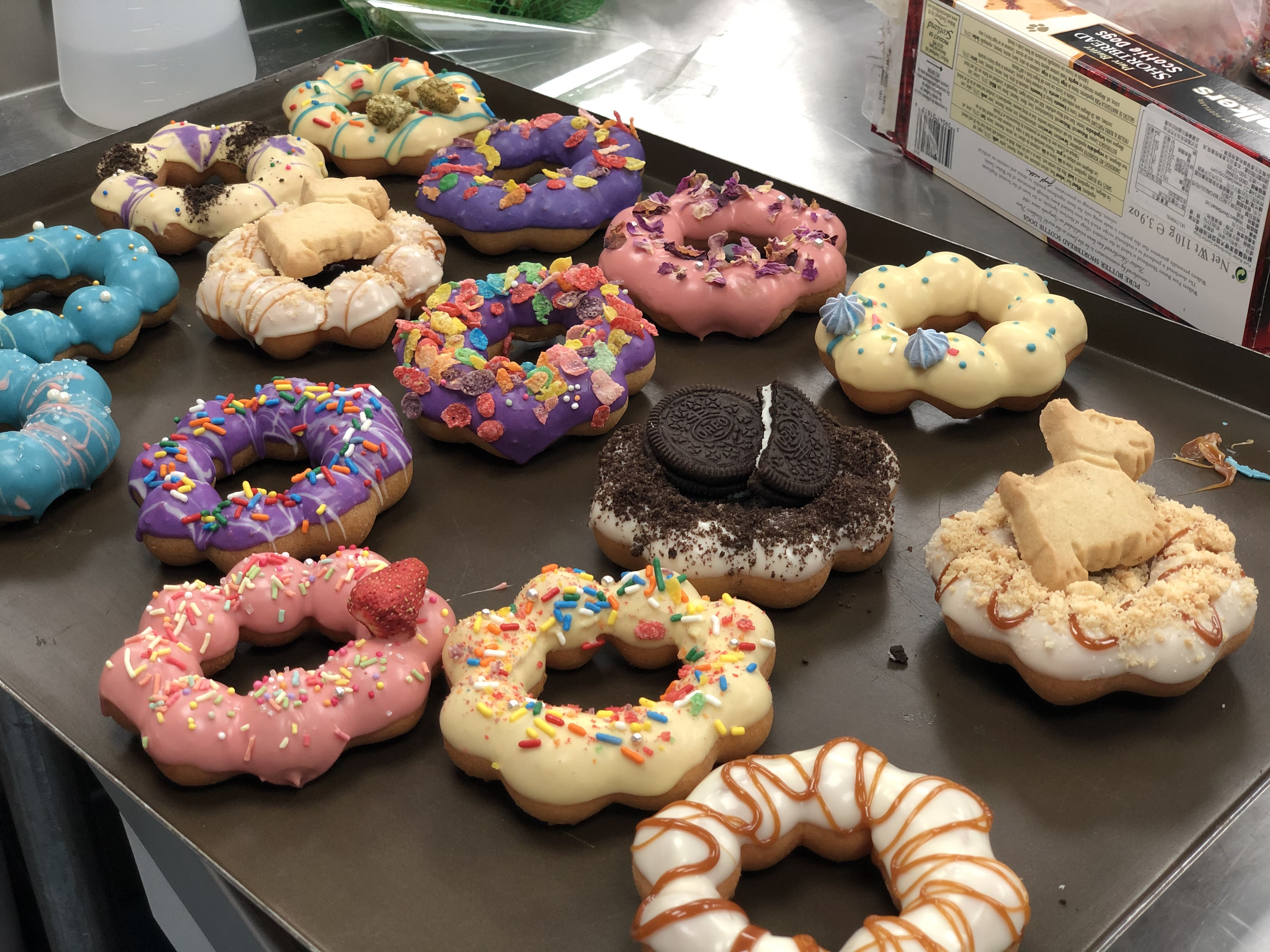
A group of mochi donuts

The mochi donuts are made with rice flour, making them flexible and recognizable due to their distinct shape of eight small balls connected as a circle. There are around 25 flavors of the food, but it varies by location. Listed on their website are:

- Strawberry
- Yuzu
- Yogurt
- Ube
- Taro
- Milk Pebble
- Churro
- Coffee
- Ube Original
- Chocolate
- Banana Milk
- Black Sugar
- Melona
- Strawberry Funnel
- Matcha
- Red Velvet
- Pistachio
- Peanut Butter
- Original
- Cookies & Creme
- Blueberry
- Mango
- Black Sesame
- Nutella
- Cheesecake
  - Tiramisu Cheesecake

Hot dogs offered are in a distinct Korean style, being wrapped in a bun similar to a corn dog. They can come wrapped in potatoes or ramen toppings, covered with mozzarella and squid ink, or "volcano" style, having a spicy sausage. Tteokbokki is also available.

== Locations ==
As of 2023, Mochinut has 148 locations throughout the United States. It also has locations in the countries of South Korea and Thailand.
