= Coyote Hills (Oregon) =

Mountain range in Oregon, United States

- Location within Oregon

Highest point
- Elevation: 1,119 m (3,671 ft)

Geography
- Country: United States
- State: Oregon
- District: Baker County
- Range coordinates: 44°55′14.523″N 117°54′3.782″W
- Topo map: USGS Haines

The Coyote Hills are a mountain range in Baker County, Oregon.
