= Toypurina =

Native American medicine woman (1760–1799)

- Born: 1760
- Died: May 22, 1799 (aged 38–39); Mission San Juan Bautista
- Other name: Regina Josefa
- Citizenship: Tongva: Roman Catholic (baptised 1787)
- Occupation: Medicine woman
- Spouse: Manuel Montero
- Children: Cesario; Juana de Dios; Maria Clementina

Toypurina (1760–1799) was a Tongva medicine woman from the Jachivit village. She is notable for her opposition to the colonial rule by Spanish missionaries in California, and for her part in the planned 1785 rebellion against the Mission San Gabriel. She recruited six of the eight villages whose men participated in the attack.

== 1785 rebellion ==
The causes of the San Gabriel rebellion were complex. The rebellion originated from both the Gabrielino people's frustration at the Spanish mission's imposition on their traditional territory, as well as their oppressive rule over their culture, language, labor, and sexual life. Even the Neophytes (the Spanish term for newly baptized indigenous people) resented the poor treatment at the hands of the Spanish, and the colonists' suppression of their culture and ceremonies.

The tangible threat imposed by the Spanish colonies to territorial boundaries and settlements was a primary factor for the growing anger of the people. There was a rapid growth in the population of new Neophytes at Mission San Gabriel. Their population, and the increase in livestock, which competed with their resources, increased pressure on their ability to survive off their land. Their resentment of the Mission increased.

Baptized Indigenous peoples within Spanish missions suffered labor exploitation and second-class citizenship under the Spanish. In 1782, the Spanish governor ordered soldiers inside the missions to prohibit baptized Indigenous people from having any dances in their villages. In the fall they traditionally held their annual Mourning Ceremony, a culmination of a series of death rituals including dances. Through this practice, they believed that the souls of the deceased achieved release from the earth and entrance into the land of the dead. By the end of October 1785, Nicolás José—a Neophyte and key figure in the 1785 rebellion— and others at the mission seem to have concluded that the ban on dances was intolerable, and that their inability to carry out their rituals jeopardized the repose of their dead relatives' spirits.

Nicolás José approached Toypurina, who was widely renowned as a wise and talented medicine person and whose brother was the head of her village. This kinship connection likely added to José asking for her aid. José reportedly gave her beads—as is customary to give a gift to doctors in return for their services —in exchange for her calling together a meeting of unbaptized Indigenous peoples from the area. Toypurina agreed, and contacted leaders of other villages to convince them to join the revolt.

On the night of the attack, men armed with bows and arrows went to the mission. Toypurina accompanied them to encourage their will to fight; she was unarmed. While Toypurina was one of the people who led the revolt, the number of Spanish people at risk was small. She lived outside of the mission. Due to further growth of livestock and other factors of population, the numbers of people living in the area increased, leading to a double in numbers around the area of the Mission. Someone had betrayed them to the Mission guards, and the participants and ringleaders, Toypurina included, were captured. Spanish officials sentenced five of the attack's participants to twenty-five lashes, and another twelve to fifteen or twenty lashes. The punishments were carried out in public as a warning and lesson to all members of the mission. Toypurina, Nicolás José and leaders Chief Tomasajaquichi of Juvit village and Alijivit, from Jajamovit, were all put on trial.

When questioned about the attack, Toypurina responded in a stinging statement that became famous: she participated because

[she hated] the padres and all of you, for living here on my native soil, for trespassing upon the land of my forefathers and despoiling our tribal domains. . . . I came [to the mission] to inspire the dirty cowards to fight, and not to quail at the sight of Spanish sticks that spit fire and death, nor [to] retch at the evil smell of gunsmoke—and be done with you white invaders!

This quote appeared in Thomas Workman Temple II's article “Toypurina the Witch and the Indian Uprising at San Gabriel”. Other historians have argued that it is likely a mistranslation and an embellishment of her statement. According to the soldier who recorded her words, she said that she ‘‘was angry with the Padres and the others of the Mission, because they had come to live and establish themselves in her land.’’

Spanish officials convicted her and the three men of leading the attack. The three men were held at the prison (presidio) in San Diego, and Toypurina was held at the prison in San Gabriel while they awaited word of their punishment. In June 1788, nearly three years later, their sentences arrived from Mexico City: Nicolás José was banned from San Gabriel and sentenced to six years of hard labor in irons at the most distant penitentiary in the region. Toypurina was banished from Mission San Gabriel and sent to the most distant Spanish mission.

== Later life ==
According to trial records, Toypurina was coerced into being baptized in 1787 while held at Mission San Gabriel. Shortly after, she was moved to Mission San Carlos Borromeo. Two years after her baptism, she married a Spanish soldier named Manuel Montero, who had been serving at el Pueblo de Los Angeles. They received a tract of land from the governor. They lived in Monterey and had 3 children together (Cesario, Juana de Dios, and Maria Clementina). Scholars have debated whether Toypurina's marriage was a sign of her accepting Catholicism and Spanish ways, or whether the marriage was one of convenience. Toypurina may have accepted marriage as a way to protect herself from the often harsh conditions of Spanish missions or maybe she loved him. On May 22, 1799, Toypurina died at age 39 at Mission San Juan Bautista in Alta California.

Her direct lineal descendants are alive and currently enrolled in the Kizh tribe.

== Legacy ==
Following the Spanish authorities’ arrest of twenty-one Gabrieliños on the night of the rebellion, four of the participants identified by guards as revolt leaders were interrogated in early January 1786. Thomas Workman Temple II, a genealogist and descendant of some of the first Spanish residents at the mission in Alta California, was the first scholar to study testimony from the interrogation. He published an article about Toypurina, “Toypurina the Witch and the Indian Uprising at San Gabriel” (1958). Although scholars believe Temple may have exaggerated certain events, his account is believed to be one of the most complete about this rebellion. It has been cited as a major reference in subsequent articles and books.

Toypurina has become a symbol to Californians and other Americans of Gabrieliño resistance to the missions. She is a central figure among California Native women who protested against Spanish colonialism.

She lived within a matriarchal power structure in which women were at the center of a tribe's ritual and spiritual life. After Toypurina's death, Native American women formed a religious-political movement that awarded power and influence to female deities and entrusted women with maintaining the health and well-being of their communities. As William Bauer writes in Toypurina, she “emerges from the historical record as a woman who not only confronted Spanish expansion in southern California but also charted a path for her survival and the endurance of her people.”

Well-known accounts of Toypurina's rebellion often depict her as a treacherous witch or seductive sorceress, including Temple's article, regarded as one of the most influential for subsequent writings on the Native woman. Toypurina's resistance against the colonial authorities through medicine and dialogue was consistent with the women's “other means of creating counter-histories,” such as through “oral and visual traditions”. These are how subjected women under the Spanish missions succeeded in remaining within the collective memories and resist throughout generations. In “Engendering the History of Alta California, 1769-1848,” Antonia Castañeda suggests that “women themselves used witchcraft as a means of subverting the socio-sexual order sanctioned by religion and enshrined in the colonial honor code." She said that using “sexualized magic to control men and subvert the male order by symbolically using their own bodies” was their way of re-asserting their power physically, in face of the overbearing colonial rule.

== References in other media ==
In the early 21st century, Toypurina has become somewhat of a pop icon for Native American female resistance in her region. Many sketches and cartoons of her appear on Google Images.

On either side of El Monte, Toypurina is celebrated through monumental works of public art: Raul González, Ricardo Estrada, and Joséph “Nuke” Montalvo painted a 60-by-20-foot mural entitled Conoce Tus Raíces (2009) (Spanish for “Know Your Roots”) in Boyle Heights. The mural was completed on the main wall of Ramona Gardens, a public housing complex historically inhabited by Mexican and Latino families. Toypurina is portrayed in a portrait at the center of the work of Art, flashing a defiant stare and proud posture. This mural is in the center of the community's numerous activities, such as children enjoying the new library of the period, and other young residents’ playing sports. One of the mural's creators characterized Toypurina as incarnating “the ultimate strength, the woman fighter, the mother who protects her children from harm at Ramona Gardens.”

Judy Baca, Chicana artist and Gabrieliño traditionalist, designed a 20-foot arch and a 100-foot plaza prayer mound named Danzas Indígenas (Indigenous Dances, 1993), which is installed on a Metrolink commuter train platform in Baldwin Park. The memorial was dedicated to Toypurina, and also conceived as a reference to the nearby San Gabriel Mission's historical archway. Some have hinted at the irony of the memorial's location, a commuter train platform, which is typically associated with anonymity, unfamiliarity, transience, and separation of family, home, and work, in contrast with Native tribes’ communitarian organization. Baca described her work as seeking to “put memory back into a piece of the land.” She created a stone mound in her installation specifically as a replica of a stone mound that Gabrieliños would have used for prayer.

Chilean author Isabel Allende referred to Toypurina in her novel Zorro (2005). The book begins with the attack on the San Gabriel Mission, said to have taken place in 1790. Don Alejandro de la Vega, Spanish defense leader, spares Toypurina and nurses her back to health. After three years of being converted to Christianity at the distant mission, Toypurina takes the baptismal name Regina, returns to California and marries Don Alejandro. The couple are initially shown to be in love, but the marriage declines. In this novel, they have one child together, Diego - the future Zorro. He is strongly influenced by his mother's teaching him the ways of her people.

On January 13, 2007, the Studio for Southern California History included Toypurina as one of the many women who made significant contributions to California history.

In 2014 the play Toypurina, about her life, premiered at the San Gabriel Mission Playhouse.

== See also ==
- Gabrielino traditional narratives
- Native American history of California
- California mission clash of cultures
- Zorro (novel) (Isabel Allende)
